= Mullah Yasin =

Kurdish businessman (born 1975)

Yasin Mahmoud Rashid
- مەلا یاسین
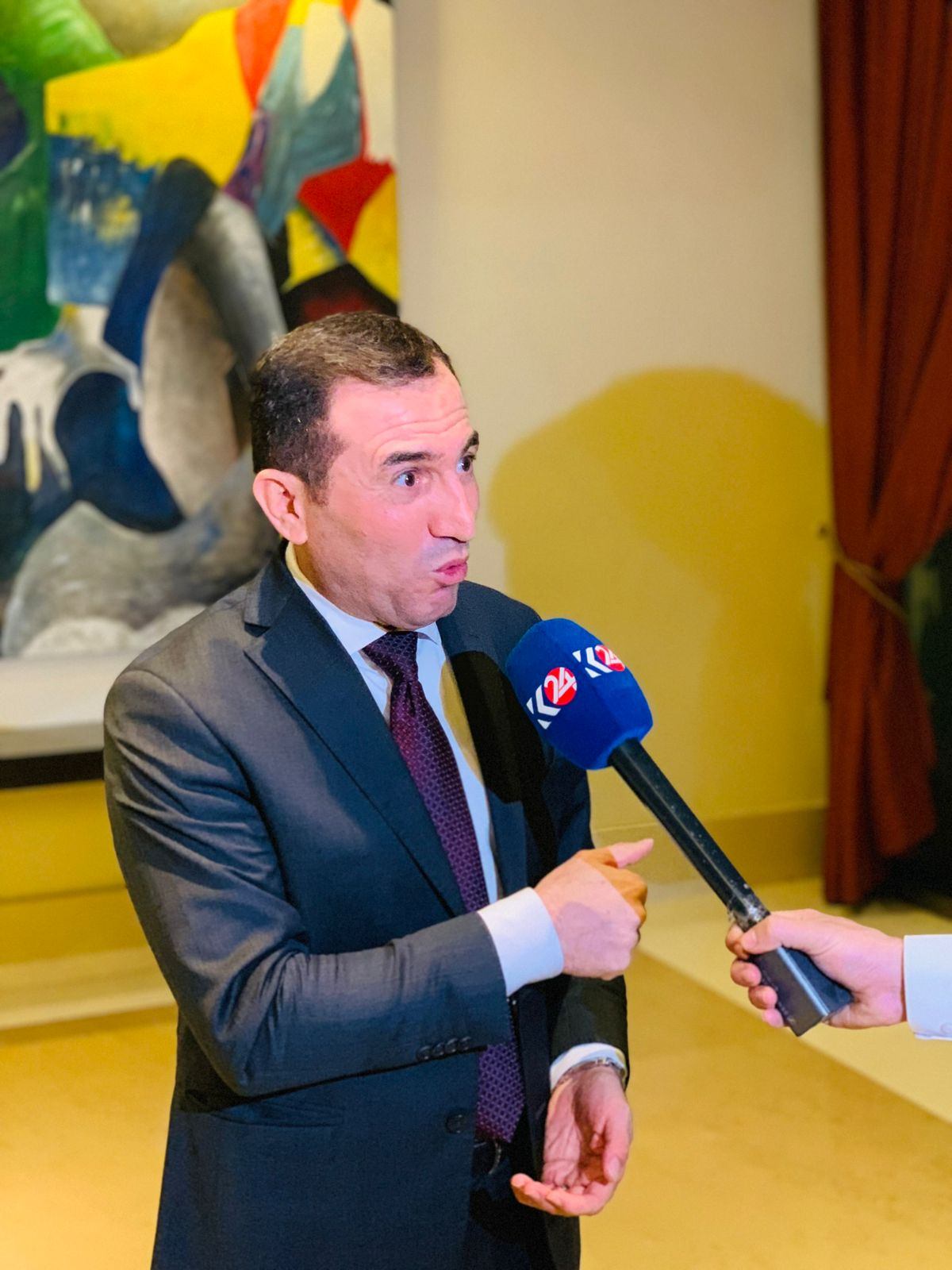
- Born: 1975 (age 50–51); Sulaimanya, Kurdistan Region
- Occupations: Businessman, spokesman for the Kurdistan Investors Union
- Website: www.bareazgroup.com

Yasin Mahmoud Rashid, also known as Mullah Yasin, is a Kurdish businessman and spokesperson for the Kurdistan Investors Union. He was born in 1975 in Sharbazher, Sulaymaniyah Governorate, Iraq.

== Biography ==
Yasin Mahmood established the Bareaz Group, a property company.

He published a book on the investment sector in Kurdistan titled Residential Investment Between Criticism and Reality. He subsequently established the Kurdistan Investors Union, which aims to support the private and official activities of the government. He was appointed as the official spokesman of the union and continues in that post.

== Bareaz Group ==
The companies of Barez group was established at the end of 2001 and opened a charity gateway to Sulaymaniyah and Kurdistan with a new factory for manufacturing PVC doors and windows.

In 2002, Mahmood brought the first MDF assembly plant to Kurdistan Region in Iraq.

Member of the listed order: In 2003, the idea of establishing a sports complex and stadium (Tartan) was first established by the group in this field, which has provided ten sports complexes to the city of Kirkuk.

In 2004 and 2005, his projects covered other Iraqi cities besides the Kurdistan Region. They brought the idea of building housing communities and started dozens of housing projects in Kurdistan cities and towns.

At the end of 2006, the Asuda project for the construction of 25,000 housing units was approved by the Kurdistan Regional Government. The Project of Asuda consists of:

- Charmo City in Chamchamal
- Goran City in Halabja.
- Roj City in Ranya
- Hamoon City in Koysinjaq
- Mir City in Dukan
- Nozhin City in Darbandikhan
- Green City, Lebanon City, Dia City, Brwa City and Barez City projects in Sulaymaniyah

Alongside the Asuda project, the company has a license for the joint project of Danya City, in Sulaymaniyah province. The group also has a license for the Project of Dayk city, which is another project in Sulaymaniyah, and is a new model of construction in Kurdistan. In addition to the residential project, the group has obtained several other investment licenses in the industrial, tourism and commercial sectors. He is the owner of a tourism project in Dukan resort. In the commercial sector, this includes the Garduni Restaurant, Spa Services, in the Sulaymaniyah Point project. He is also the agent of the furniture brands (Isteqbal, Bellona and Mandi in the Kurdistan Region.

Mullah Yasin currently has two charity projects:

- The media project (People's Media Network)
- The (Organization of charity for people) Project: This project aims to provide assistance to the poor, which annually allocates about (350 to 400) million dinars for charitable works and sponsoring seminars and panels of the private sector, public sector and NGOs.
