= Garmian Region =

Garmiyan Kurdish: گەرمیان
- Region
- Garmiyan in Iraq
- Coordinates: 34°37′45″N 45°19′20″E
- Country: Iraq
- Autonomous Region: Kurdistan Region
- Governorate: Sulaymaniyah
- Region: Garmiyan
- Elevation: 231 m (758 ft)
- Time zone: UTC+3
- Postal code: 46021

Garmian or Garmiyan (Kurdish: گەرمیان) is a region in the Kurdistan Region of Northern Iraq. It is historically considered to be a Kurdish province, and the center of the region is located about (62 km) south of Sulaymaniyah City and (104 km) east of Kirkuk city. It includes the Kalar, Kifri, Darbandikhan and Chamchamal districts, and unofficially the district of Tuz Khurmatu and sometimes the district of Khanaqin. Kalar is the administrative center of the Garmiyan district. Some historic maps includes Kirkuk and Daquq to the region of Germiyan.

== Name ==
The term (Germiyan) is a Kurdish word used to denote the hot and dry area in Kurdistan, which describes, indicates and gives information about location and climate. Regions with similar names exists throughout Kurdistan, such as Zozan up north. Association with the word germ have been recorded through history in the region, as in Beth Garmai.

== History ==
The region was for years primarily a rural one, with villagers herding cattle and involved in agriculture. It is a strategically important region between the oil rich Kirkuk and its proximity to the Iranian border. From the early 1970s onwards, the Baathist Government depopulated the villages along the border to Iran, and resettled their population in collective villages. In mid 1970s the region became a stronghold for the Kurdish resistance under the lead of Nashirwan Mustafa of the Patriotic Union of Kurdistan (PUK) and the left-wing militia Komala. They were against the authority of tribal leaders and landowners which were often dispossessed. Their land was then distributed among the poor, rural population. Thus they held significant support in the region and they were able to recruit new members. In March 1987, the region was included in a "prohibited area" and the Iraqi army began to destroy villages and relocate their inhabitants. Villagers who surrendered where sent to collective villages.

=== Anfal campaign ===
On the 7 April 1988, the Iraqi security forces launched an attack on the Garmyan region as part of the Anfal campaign. The army counted with the support Kurdish so-called Jash units, tanks and helicopters and aimed at detaining the population of villages. They were detained and sent to detention camps such as Topzawa, Dibs or Nugra Salman.

== Climate ==
The Garmiyan Region in Southern Kurdistan (Northern Iraq) and is known for having a warm and dry climate, occasionally reaching over 50 °C in the summer. It is warmest in July and coldest in January. The temperature rarely reaches below 0 °C in the winter. According to the Köppen-Geiger climate classification system, Garmiyan has a Semi-arid climate (BSh).

== Notable inhabitants ==
- Kawa Garmeyani

== See also ==
- Garmekan (Sasanian province located in modern day Kurdistan Region of Iraq)
