= Chingyan =

Kurdish village in Kurdistan Region, Iraq

Chingyan چنگیان
- Village
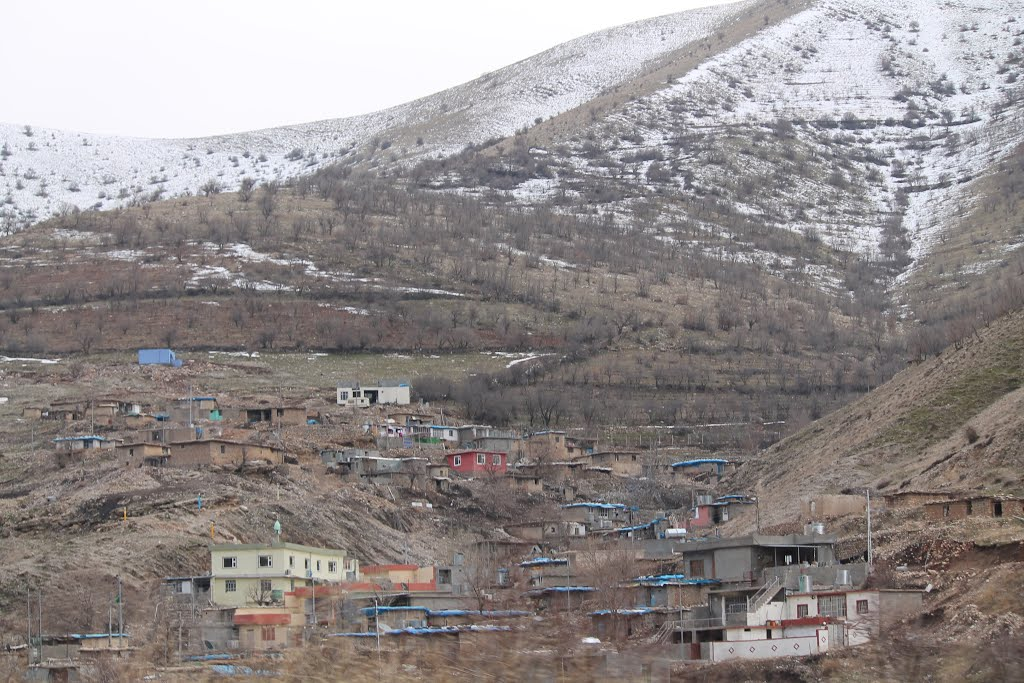
- Interactive map of Chingyan
- Coordinates: 35.6261°N 45.6222°E
- Country: Iraq
- Region: Kurdistan Region
- Governorate: Sulaymaniyah Governorate
- District: Sharbazher District
- Elevation: 1,250 m (4,100 ft)

Chingyan (Sorani Kurdish: چنگیان) is a small Kurdish village located in Sharbazher District, within the Sulaymaniyah Governorate of the Kurdistan Region of Iraq. Situated at an elevation of around 1,250 m above sea level, it lies just a short distance from Sulaymaniyah city

== Etymology ==
The name "Chingyan" comes from the tribal name of the group, originally pronounced Chegini.

== Settlement ==
The Chegini (also spelled Chigini or Chingyani) are a historical Iranian tribe originally from north western Iran. Over time, parts of the tribe moved east to Khorasan, and later migrated west again to Kurdistan province and then into Sulaymaniyah in Iraqi Kurdistan.
