= Kifri District (Sulaymaniyah) =

- District
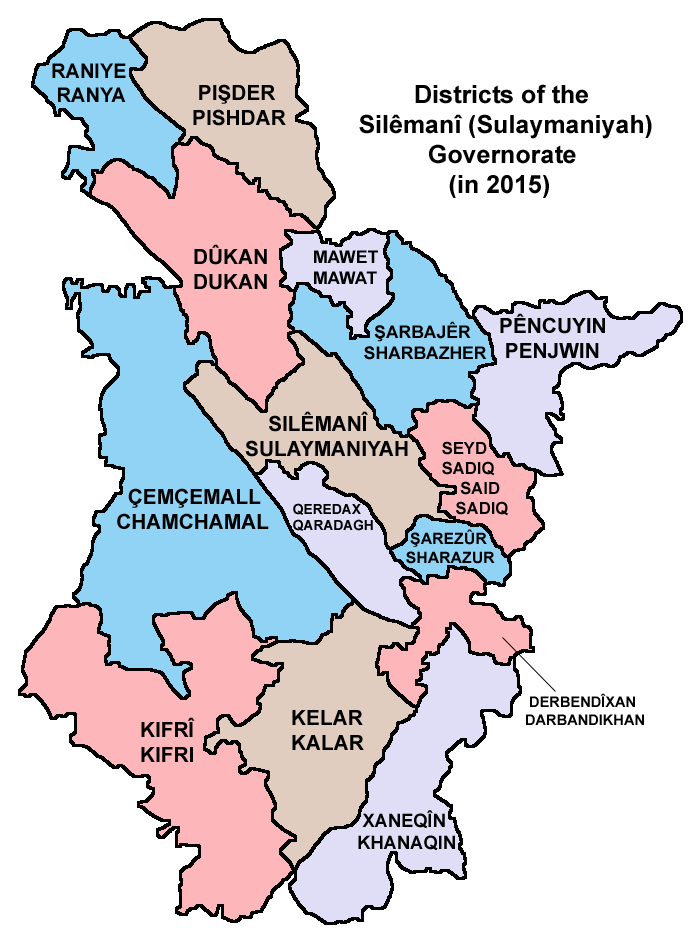
- Districts of Sulaymaniyah Governorate

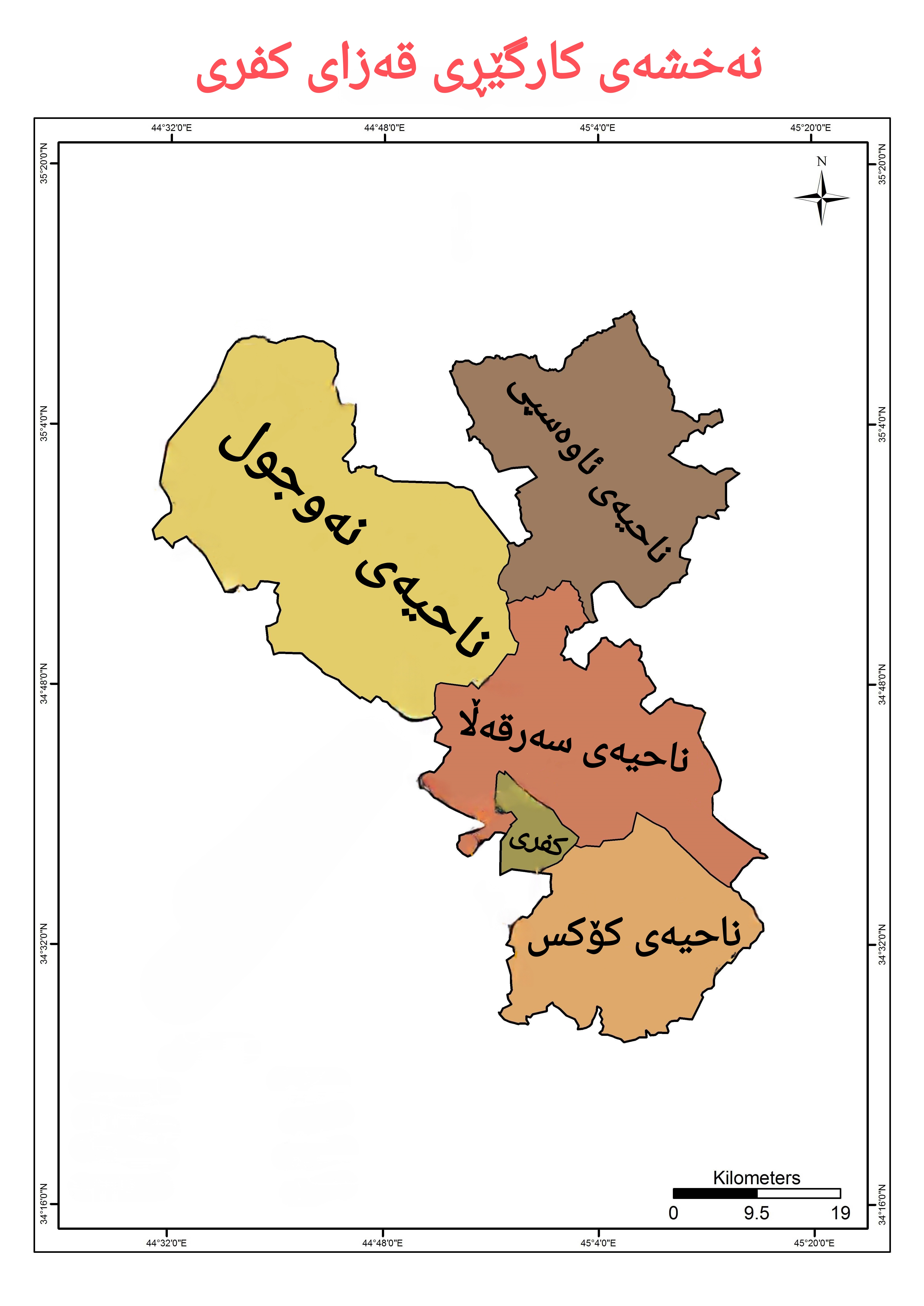
- Subdistricts of Kifri District (Sulaymaniyah)
- Country: Iraq
- Governorate: Sulaymaniyah
- Seat: Kifri

Kifri District (Arabic: قضاء كفري; Kurdish: قەزای کفری; Turkish: Kifri ilçesi) is a de facto district in Sulaymaniyah Governorate, Iraq. Its main town is Kifri.

Officially, according to the Federal government of Iraq, Kifri District belongs to Diyala Governorate. However, this district has been de facto split in two between Diyala Governorate and Sulaymaniyah Governorate (Kurdistan Region).

In effect, there exist two "Kifri Districts". There's one "Kifri District" in Diyala Governorate consisting of two subdistricts of Jabara Subdistrict and Qaratappa Subdistrict. There's another "Kifri District" which includes Kifri Central Subdistrict (which includes the capital city Kifri), Kokis Subdistrict, and Sarqala Subdistrict. Under jurisdiction of Sulaymaniyah Governorate (Kurdistan Region), this portion of Kifri District has been expanded to include two additional subdistricts. These are Nawjul Subdistrict (officially according to the Federal government of Iraq part of Tooz District, Saladin Governorate), and Awaspi Subdistrict (created from Rizgari Subdistrict, Kalar District).
