= Geldara =

Geldara گـێـڵـدەرە
- Village
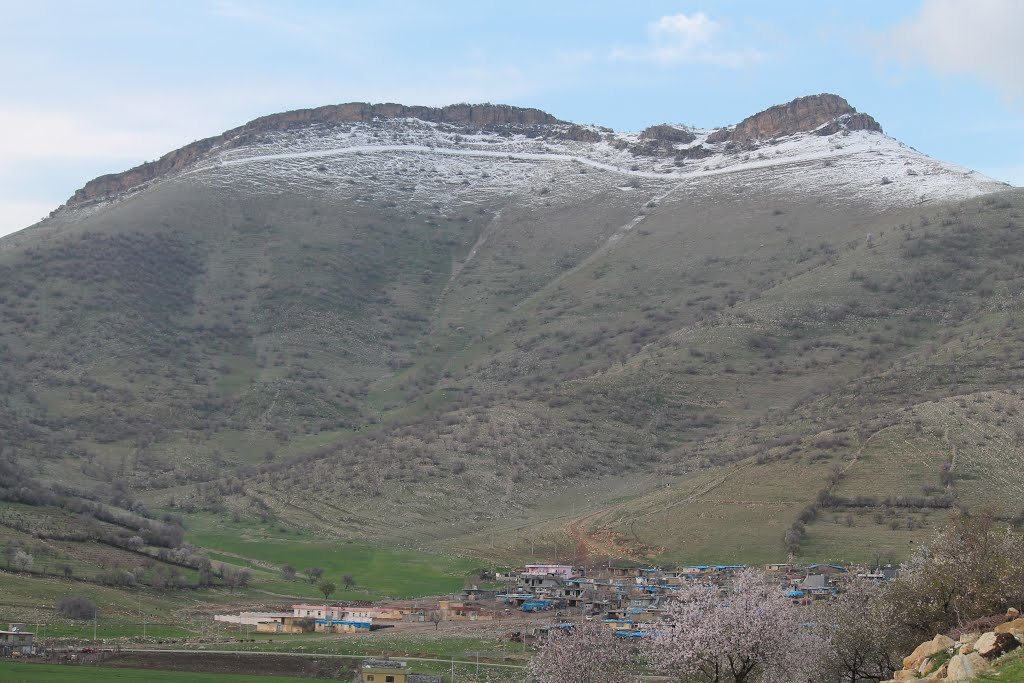

- Location within Iraqi Kurdistan Location within Iraq
- Coordinates: 35°31′58.3″N 45°40′03.04″E
- Country: Iraq
- Governorate: As Sulaymaniyah
- Region: Kurdistan
- Time zone: UTC+3 (AST)
- Area code: +(964)

Gelara or Geldara (Kurdish: گێڵدەرە) is a village in Sulaymaniyah Governorate, Kurdistan Region of Iraq, east of Sulaymaniyah.
