= Tooz District =

Tooz District قضاء طوز
- District
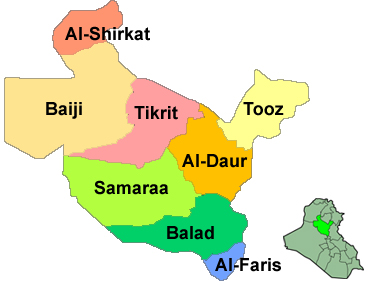
- Interactive map of Tooz District
- Country: Iraq
- Governorate: Saladin Governorate
- Seat: Tuz Khormato

Tooz District (Arabic: قضاء الطوز) is a district in the north-eastern part of Saladin Governorate, Iraq. Its towns include Tuz Khurmatu, Sulaiman Bek, and Amirli. Its population is mixed between Arabs, Kurds and Turkmen. The district's name is in the Turkmen dialect, meaning 'salt.'

There are areas that officially, according to the Federal government of Iraq, belong to Tooz District; but that they have been de facto under the jurisdiction and control of Sulaymaniyah Governorate (Kurdistan Region). These areas constitute Nawjul Subdistrict. Under jurisdiction of Sulaymaniyah Governorate (Kurdistan Region), this subdistrict has been incorporated to Kifri District (itself a disputed district, divided in two between Sulaymaniyah and Diyala).
