= UOR =

UoR or UOR can refer to:

- Uganda Oil Refinery, a planned oil refinery in Hoima District, Western Uganda
- Union of Orthodox Rabbis
- Universal Orlando Resort
- Urgent Operational Requirement
- Uchilishche Olimpiyskogo Rezerva (UOR, училище олимпийского резерва, УОР), Olympic Reserve School, a type of Soviet sports school
- University of Ruhuna, Matara, Sri Lanka
- University of the Rockies, Denver, Colorado, USA
- University of Redlands, Redlands, California, USA
- University of Reading, Berkshire, England, UK
- University of Raparin, Sulaymaniyah, Kurdistan, Iraq
- University of Rajasthan, Jaipur, Rajasthan, India
