= Kalar, Iraq =

Kalar کەلار Kelar
- City
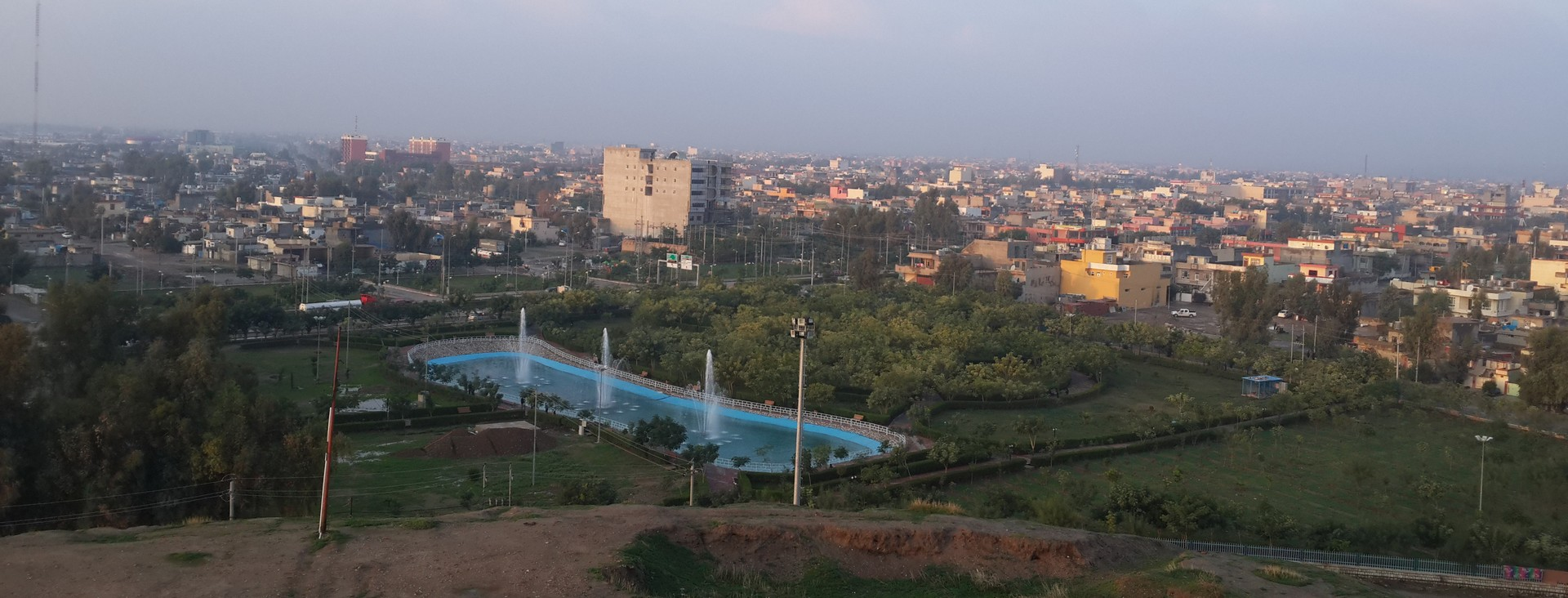
- The view of Kalar from Sherwana Castle

- Kalar in Iraq
- Coordinates: 34°37′45″N 45°19′20″E
- Country: Iraq
- Autonomous Region: Kurdistan Region
- Governorate: Sulaymaniyah
- District: Kalar
- Elevation: 200–255 m (656–837 ft)

Population (2018)
  - Total: 149,860
- Time zone: UTC+3 (UTC+3)
- Postal code: 46021

Kalar (Arabic: كلار; Sorani Kurdish: کەلار, romanized: Kelar) is a city in the Kurdistan Region of Iraq and is the administrative center of the Garmian Region. It is located on the west bank of the Sirwan (Diyala) river in Sulaymaniyah Governorate, east of Kifri, and west of the towns of Qasri Shirin and Sarpol Zahab, located in Kermanshah.

== Climate ==
Kalar is located in the Garmian Region in Southern Kurdistan and is known for having a warm and dry climate, occasionally reaching over 50°C (122°F) in the summer. It is warmest in July and coldest in January. The temperature rarely reaches below 0°C (32°F) in the winter. According to the Köppen-Geiger climate classification system, Kalar has a Semi-arid climate (BSh).

Climate data for Kalar, Iraq
Month	Jan	Feb	Mar	Apr	May	Jun	Jul	Aug	Sep	Oct	Nov	Dec	Year
Record high °C (°F)	19.24 (66.63)	20.26 (68.47)	28.36 (83.05)	31.4 (88.5)	38.49 (101.28)	45.58 (114.04)	47.6 (117.7)	45.58 (114.04)	43.55 (110.39)	27.35 (81.23)	35.45 (95.81)	25.32 (77.58)	47.6 (117.7)
Mean daily maximum °C (°F)	9.76 (49.57)	11.52 (52.74)	15.92 (60.66)	21.86 (71.35)	28.62 (83.52)	36.04 (96.87)	40.25 (104.45)	40.18 (104.32)	35.11 (95.20)	17.81 (64.06)	27.02 (80.64)	12.28 (54.10)	24.70 (76.46)
Daily mean °C (°F)	6.54 (43.77)	7.94 (46.29)	11.94 (53.49)	17.56 (63.61)	24.42 (75.96)	31.46 (88.63)	35.46 (95.83)	35.08 (95.14)	30.07 (86.13)	14.06 (57.31)	22.51 (72.52)	8.83 (47.89)	20.49 (68.88)
Mean daily minimum °C (°F)	1.81 (35.26)	2.54 (36.57)	5.3 (41.5)	9.31 (48.76)	15.06 (59.11)	20.84 (69.51)	24.39 (75.90)	24.39 (75.90)	20.05 (68.09)	8.3 (46.9)	14.58 (58.24)	4.0 (39.2)	12.55 (54.58)
Record low °C (°F)	−8.1 (17.4)	−7.09 (19.24)	−8.1 (17.4)	0.0 (32.0)	5.06 (41.11)	14.18 (57.52)	18.23 (64.81)	15.19 (59.34)	12.15 (53.87)	−4.05 (24.71)	7.09 (44.76)	−8.1 (17.4)	−8.1 (17.4)
Average precipitation mm (inches)	165.46 (6.51)	145.91 (5.74)	182.21 (7.17)	89.01 (3.50)	68.4 (2.69)	2.57 (0.10)	0.58 (0.02)	0.78 (0.03)	1.69 (0.07)	89.18 (3.51)	52.39 (2.06)	137.55 (5.42)	935.73 (36.82)
Average precipitation days	10.69	11.41	13.81	10.58	7.83	0.83	0.27	0.36	0.46	7.45	5.34	9.48	78.51
Average relative humidity (%)	63.74	63.46	60.71	53.37	39.0	21.31	16.53	16.73	20.65	33.31	47.82	57.98	41.22
Mean daily sunshine hours	7.8	7.89	10.49	12.95	14.08	14.66	14.53	14.08	12.47	9.6	8.38	7.84	11.23

== Notable inhabitants ==
- Kawa Garmeyani (1981-2013), Kurdish journalist

== See also ==
- Garmekan (Sasanian province located in modern-day Kurdistan Region of Iraq)
- Garmian Region
- Beth Garmai
