= Kelkan =

Village in Kurdistan Region, Iraq

Kelkan كلكان
- Location in Kurdistan Region, Iraq Kelkan (Iraq)
- Coordinates: 36°5′20″N 44°51′28″E
- Country: Iraq
- Region: Kurdistan Region
- Governorate: Sulaymaniyah
- District: Dokan
- Time zone: AST (UTC+3)

Kelkan (Kurdish: كلكان) is a village located in the Kurdistan Region of Iraq, adjacent to Dukan Lake and close to the city of Sulaymaniyah. It is part of the Xidran sub-district of the Dokan District.

== Notable people ==
- Jalal Talabani
