= Dokan District =

Dokan District قەزای دۆکان Qezay Dokan
- District
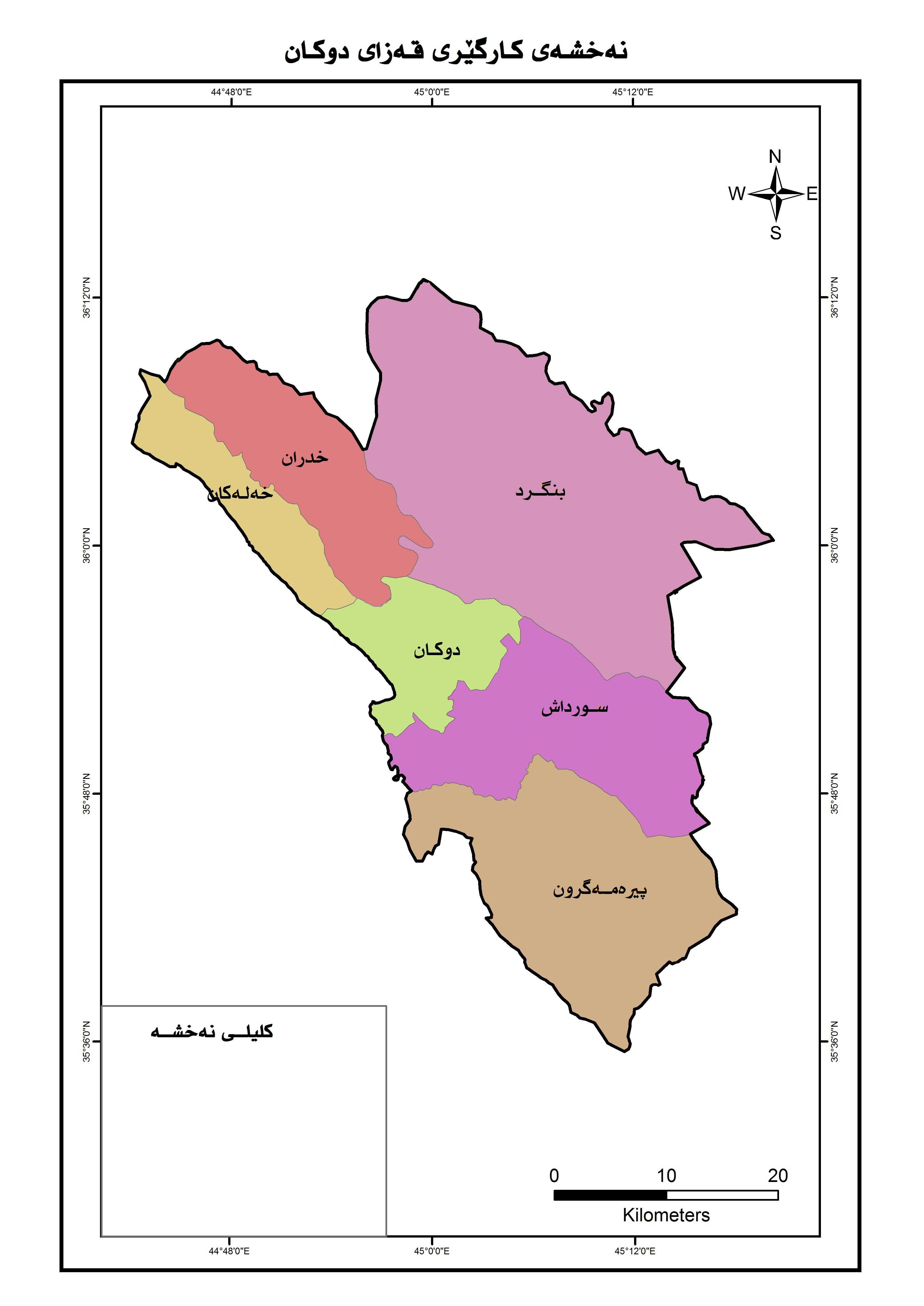
- Map of the district

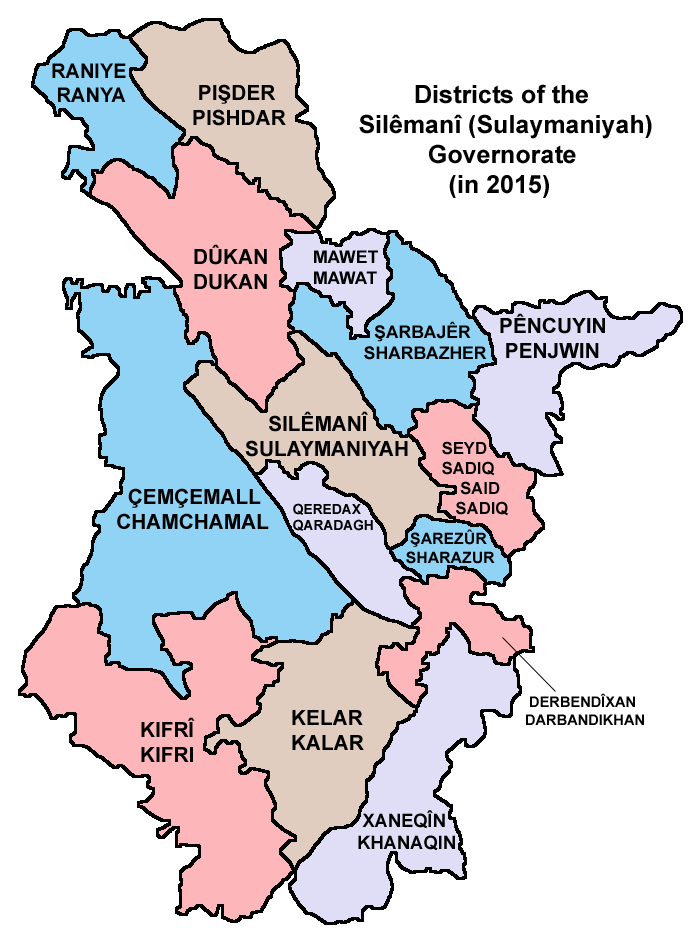
- Districts of the Sulaymaniyah Governorate
- Interactive map of Dokan District
- Coordinates: 35°55′N 45°05′E
- Country: Iraq
- Autonomous region: Kurdistan Region
- Governorate: Sulaymaniyah Governorate
- Time zone: UTC+3 (AST)

Dokan District (Kurdish: قەزای دۆکان, romanized: Qezay Dokan) is a district of the Sulaymaniyah Governorate, Kurdistan Region, Iraq. Its main town is Dokan. In the last census conducted in 2024, the district had a population of 75,167. The town of Dokan is the centre of the district with a population of 16,074.

== See also ==
- Kelkan - village in Dokan District
