= University of Raparin =

Public university in Ranya, Iraq

University of Raparin (UoR)
- زانکۆی ڕاپەڕین
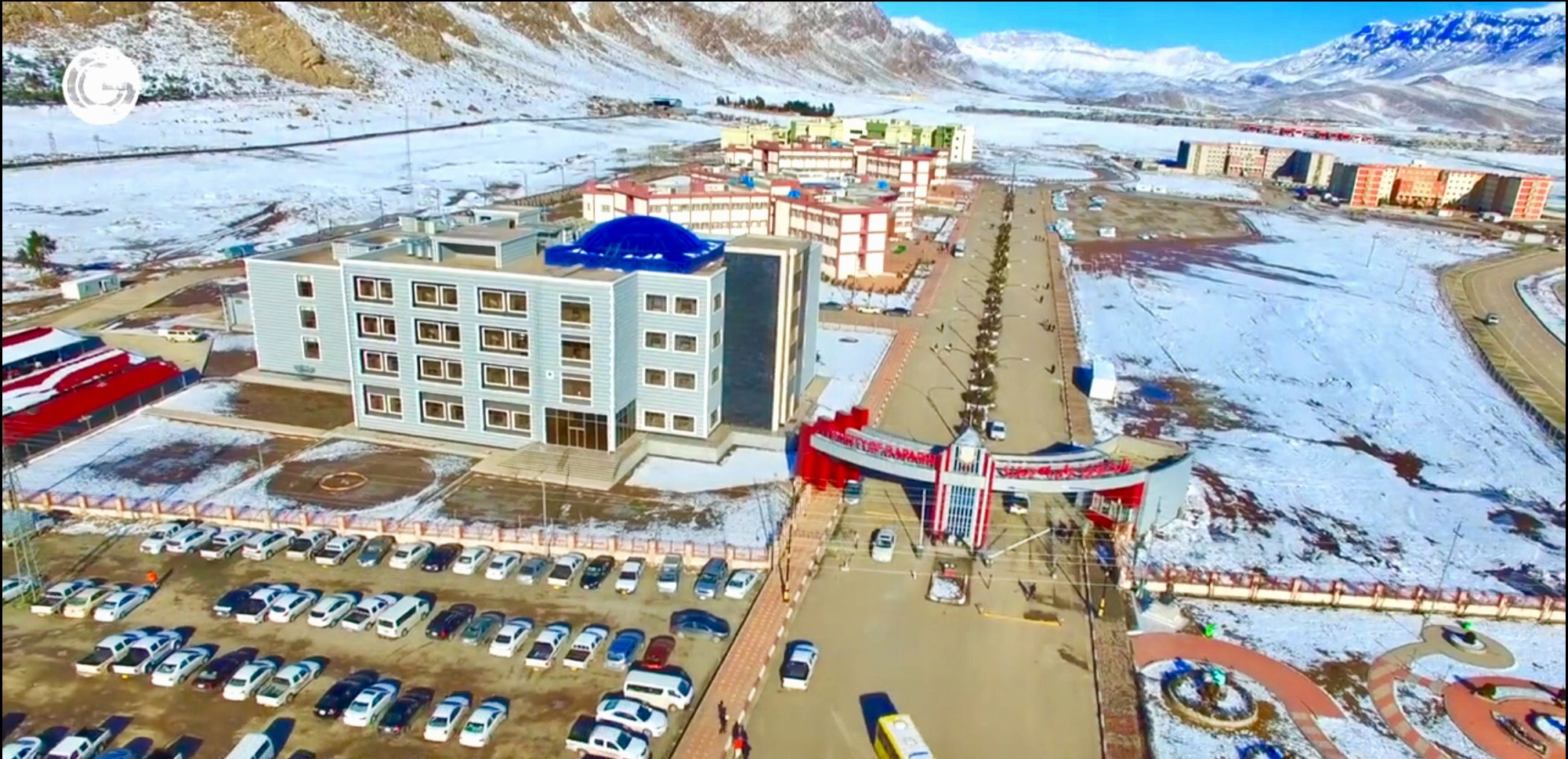
- Type: Public university
- Established: July 8th, 2010
- President: Assist.Prof.Dr.Paiman R. Ahmed
- Location: Ranya, Sulaymaniyah Governorate, Iraqi Kurdistan, Iraq; 36.2351°N 44.8636°E
- Website: uor.edu.krd

The University of Raparin is a public university in Ranya, in the Sulaymaniyah Governorate of the Kurdistan Region of Iraq. It was established in 2010.

The main campus of the Raparin University is located in Rania District, and the second campus is located in Qaladiza District.

The university's name comes from the Kurdish 1991 uprising in Sulaymaniyah, that started in Ranya on March 5, 1991.

== Presidents ==
- Prof. Dr. Mohammed Ali Abdullah: 2011 - 2016
- Assist. Prof. Dr. Mofaq Khalid Ibrahim: 2016–2022
- Assist. Prof. Dr. Paiman R. Ahmed: 2022–Present

== Scientific Journals ==
Journal of Raparin University is the first multi-discipline journal in University of Raparin.

== Campuses and Colleges ==
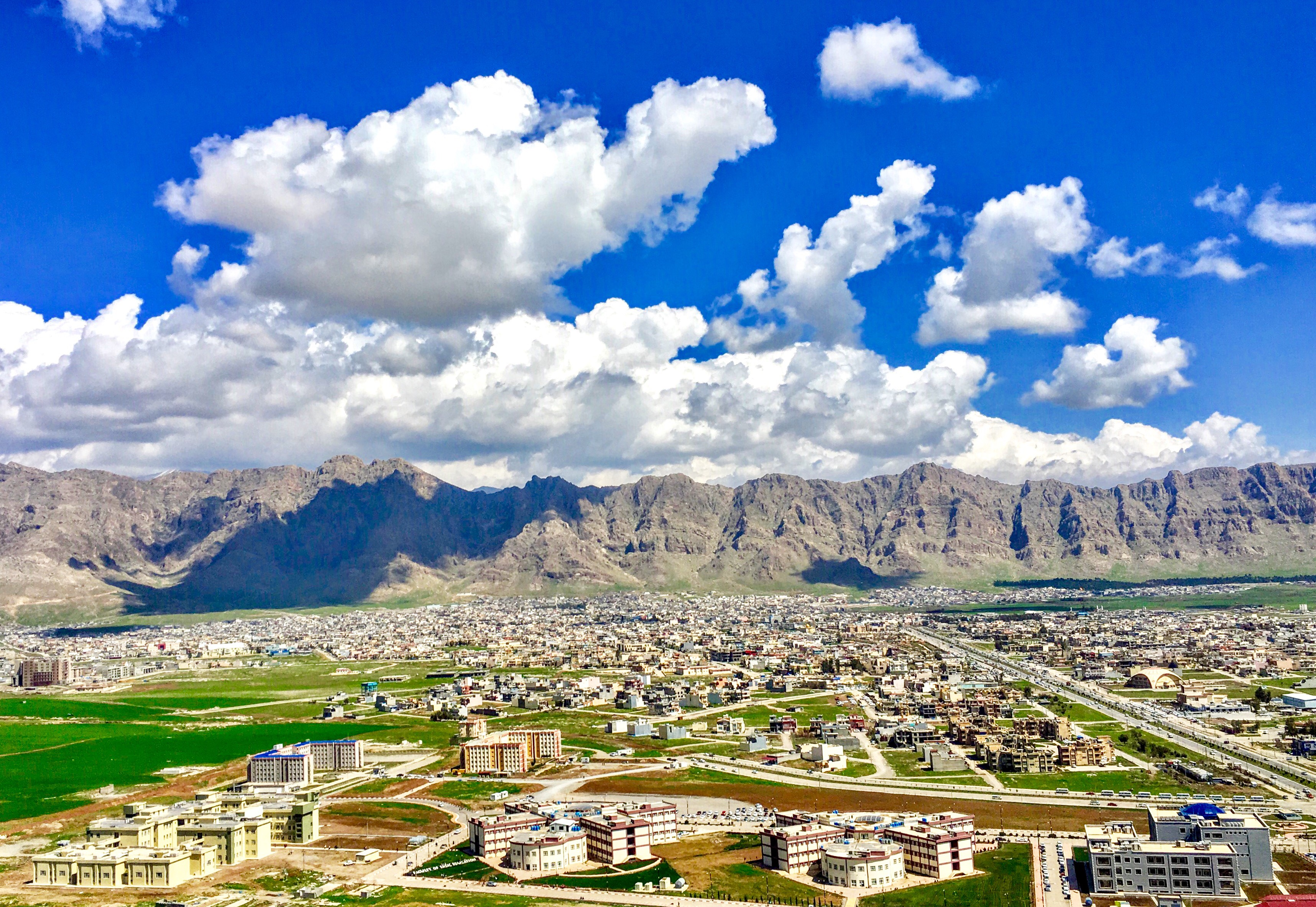
University of Raparin (Rania Campus)

=== Rania Campus ===
- College of Nursing
- College of Humanities
  - History Department
  - Geography Department
  - Philosophy Department
  - Law Department
  - Business Administration Department
- College of Basic Education
  - Kurdish Department
  - Arabic Department
  - Mathematics Department
  - Computer Department
  - English Department
  - Kindergarten Department
- College of Sciences
  - Biology Department
  - Medical Laboratory Science
  - Chemistry Department
  - Physics Department
- Civil Engineering Department

=== Qaladze Campus ===
- College of Education
  - Arabic Department
  - English Department
  - Kurdish Department
  - Psychology Department
- College Agricultural Engineering
  - Animal Resources
  - Horticulture

== Activities, Festivals, Workshops, Seminars, and Conferences ==
- Continuous participation of the university and its students in the anniversary ceremony of the 5 March uprising in Rania.
- Continuous participation of the university and its students in anniversary remembrance of the tragedies, uprisings, and university's martyrs day on April 24 in Qaladze.
- Organizing different activities by the students on University's Day (April 4).
- Holding seminars, workshops, training course, and media related activities by the Directorate of Relations, Media and Publications
- Opening many sport tournaments among students, lecturers and university staff by the Directorate of Sport and Cultural Activities.
- Holding many meetings, seminars and organizing many literary, cultural and Cultural activities along with opening of galleries by the Directorate of Sport and Cultural Activities.
- Active participation of the university, Lecturers, students and the staff in national, cultural patriotic events.
- The Department of Kurdish in the College of Education held a conference in Kurdish entitled "Kurdish Language Between Cultural and Scientific Duty", September 24–26, 2013.
- The College of Basic Education in cooperation with the Directorate of Media held a conference entitled "Organizing Commercial Advertisements Through the Means of Media in Accordance with International Principles" June 25–26, 2013.
- Held a 3-day campaign for preserving the archeological sites of Kurdistan Region by the History department in College of Human Sciences, January 19–21, 2014.
- Held a conference entitled "Media and Terror" on the anniversary of 117th publication of the first Kurdish newspaper by the Directorate of Relations, Media and Publications, April 23, 2015 in Rania.
- Organizing a series scientific seminars on the environment, a campaign for planting trees and opening galleries by the department of Geography in faculty of human sciences.
- The Department of Kindergarten in the College of Basic Education held its first festival entitled "Kindergarten, The First Transformative Place in the Society", May 16, 2015 in Rania.
- The Department of Philosophy in the College of Human Sciences at the University of Raparin held a conference entitled "Philosophy, Religion and Secularism", May 19–20, 2015.
- The University of Raparin organized a scientific conference for the uprising's silver jubilee entitled "The Progression of Raparin, and New Interpretations for its Entities", March 6–8, 2016 in Rania.

== University of Raparin has the following centers ==
- Research Center
- English Language Development Center.
- Career Development Center

== UoR Membership in organisations ==
- International Association of Universities (IAU)
- Eurasian Universities Union (EURAS)
- World Higher Education Database (WHED) Portal

In 2013, the University of Raparin was formally recognized by the Ministry of Higher Education and Scientific Research of Iraq. The University of Raparin has also scientific and academic relations with local and international universities.

The University of Raparin has established sisterhood partnerships with a wide range of local and international universities and it has a robust scientific relationship with them. The university has signed memorandum of understanding with 18 international universities for staff and scientific exchange, three of which are in America, two in Britain, four in Turkey, and the rest are in Sweden, Spain, Russia, Armenia, Egypt, Lebanon, Azerbaijan, Jordan and Iran.

The University of Raparin has been able to participate in ten different international projects including:

- European Commission-Erasmus Mundus Marhaba program
- DAAD-DIES-Staff 1-development training for mid-level leaders of universities in Kurdistan-Iraq with Kassel University, Germany
- IREX-Kurdistan Rural Universities Partnership Program
- IREX-Internationalization of Kurdistan Public University Campuses
- IREX-Iraq University Linkages Program-Career Development Centers Training
- Erasamus Programme of the European Union-TIGRIS Project: Transfer of Good Practices & Reinforcement of Internationalisation Strategies in Kurdistan (with European partners: University of Göttingen, Germany, University of Groningen, The Netherlands, KU Leuven University, Belgium and Masaryk University, Czech Republic.)

== See also ==
- List of universities in Iraq
