= Haval Abubakir =

Iraqi Kurdish politician

- ھەڤاڵ ئەبووبەکر
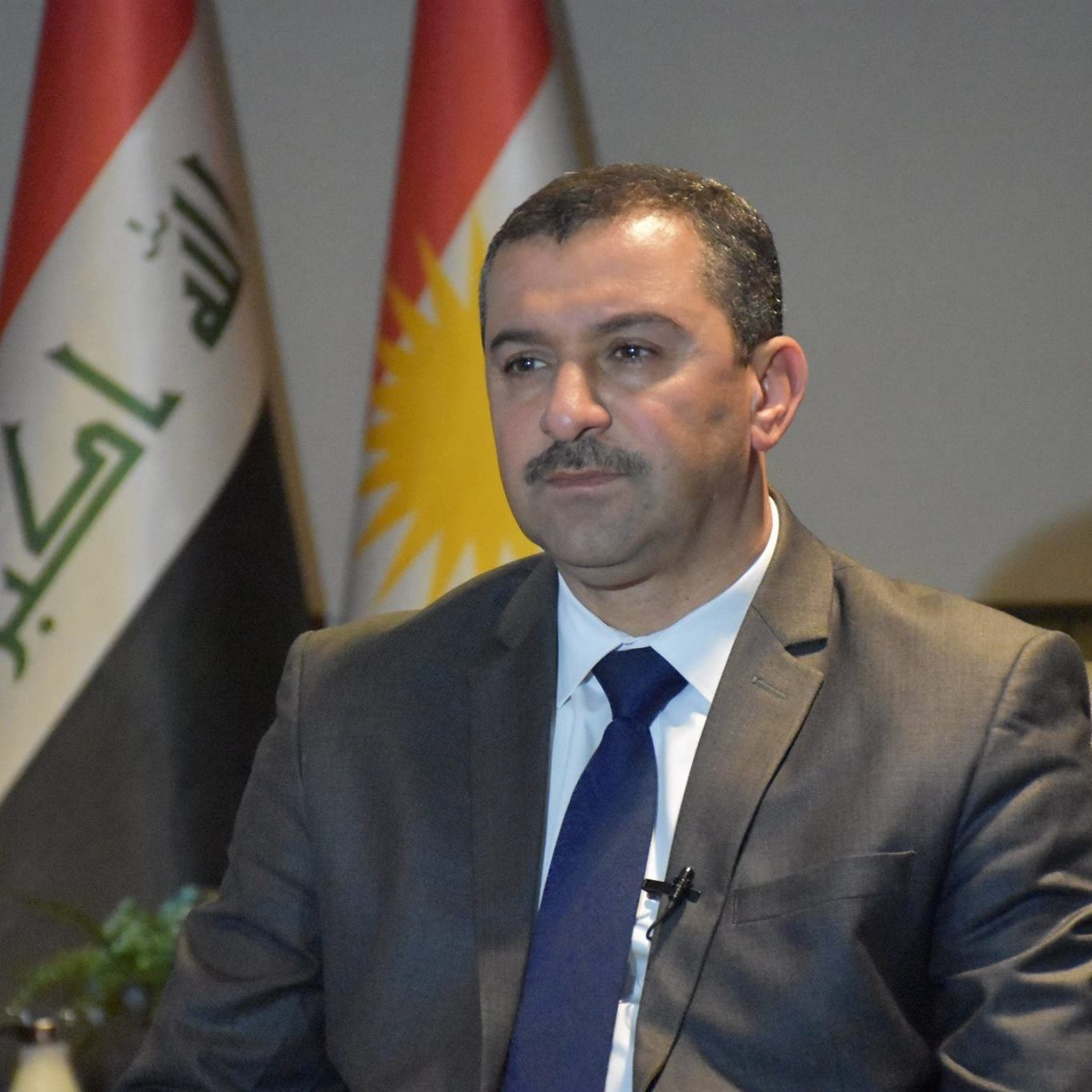

Governor of Sulaymaniyah
- Incumbent
- Assumed office 4 December 2017
- Appointed by: Sulaymaniyah Provincial Council
- President: Nechirvan Barzani; Masoud Barzani
- Prime Minister: Masrour Barzani; Nechirvan Barzani
- Preceded by: Omar Qaladzaiye (acting)

Chairperson of the Sulaymaniyah provincial council
- In office 11 December 2014 – 25 August 2016
- Appointed by: Sulaymaniyah Provincial Council
- Governor: Aso Faraidun
- Preceded by: Kawa Abdulla
- Succeeded by: Azad Mohammad Amin

Personal details
- Born: January 1, 1971 (age 55) Halabja, Iraqi Republic
- Party: Independent (2024-present)
- Other political affiliations: Movement For Change (Gorran) (Until 2024)
- Education: University of Sulaimani (PhD); Mosul Technical Institute
- Occupation: Politician
- Profession: journalist, lecturer

Haval Abubakir (Sorani Kurdish: ھەڤاڵ ئەبووبەکر Kurdish: Heval Ebûbekir) (born January 1, 1971) is an Iraqi Kurdish politician who has been serving as the Governor of Sulaymaniyah since December 4, 2017. prior to that he served as the chairperson of the Sulaymaniyah provincial council.

== Early life and Education ==
Abubakir was born on January 1, 1971, Halabja, Iraq Republic. In 1990, Abubakir got his diploma at the Mosul Technical Institute. In 2002 he earned a Bachelor's Degree in the University of Sulaimani in Kurdish Language and literature, later in 2006 he got his master's degree in Kurdish literature and journalism and in 2010 he received a PhD's in modern literature and journalism in the University of Sulaimani.

== Political career ==
=== 2014 provincial election ===
Abubakir was the head of list for the Gorran Movement in the 2014 Kurdistan Region governorate elections he received 241,241 votes and secured a seat in the Sulaymaniyah Provincial Council. Abubakir was the most voted candidate in the entire election.

=== Chairperson and Governor ===
After winning a seat in the Sulaymaniyah Provincial Council following The 2014 Kurdistan Region governorate elections, Abubakir was elected as the chairperson of the sulaymaniyah provincial council in December 11, 2014. in August 25, 2016, Abubakir alongside Aso Faraidun who was the Governor of Sulaymaniyah, both officially resigned from their positions due to a power-sharing agreement between the Patriotic Union of Kurdistan and the Gorran Movement. And Azad Mohammad Amin was elected as the successor to replace Abubakir as the chairperson of the sulaymaniyah provincial council.

Although Abubakir was supposed to assume office as governor in late 2016, due to high tensions between Kurdish political parties his appointment as the Governor of Sulaymaniyah was delayed, and he officially assumed office as governor on December 4, 2017.

=== Split from the Gorran Movement ===
In October 10, 2024, the Gorran Movement decided to withdraw from the Kurdistan Regional Government (KRG) and local administrations, while other party officials resigned, Abubakir was one of few who refused and chose to remain as governor of Sulaymaniyah. Abubakir is no longer an active member of the Gorran Movement, instead serves as a technocratic Independent officeholder.
