= Pshdar District =

Pshdar قەزای پشدەر قضاء بشدر
- District Darbandi Pshdar
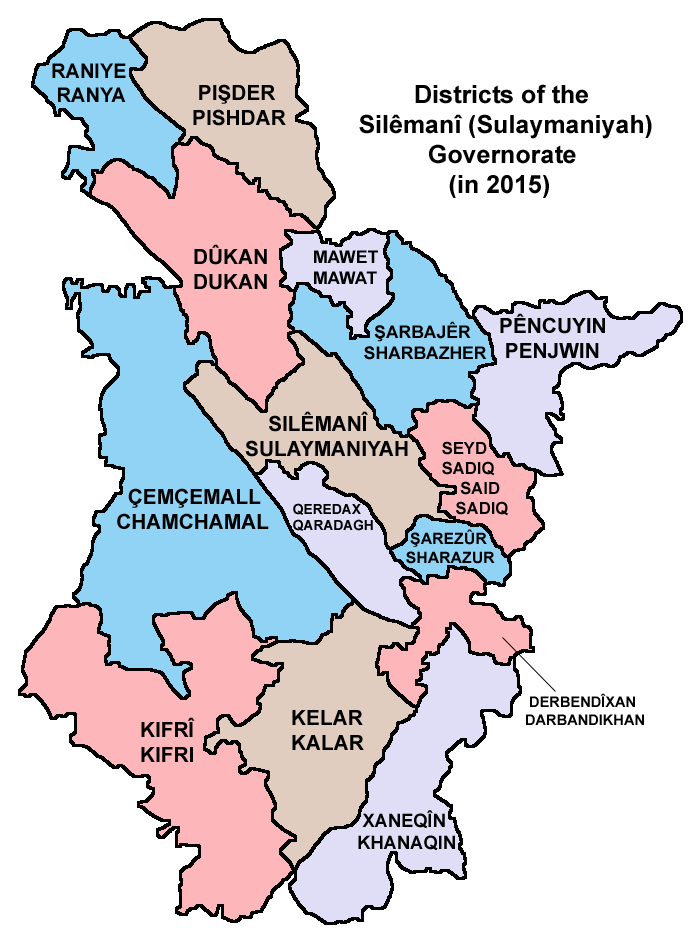
- Districts of the Sulaymaniyah Governorate
- Coordinates: 36°11′00″N 45°07′40″E
- Country: Iraq
- Autonomous region: Kurdistan Region
- Governorate: Sulaymaniyah
- Largest city: Qaladiza
- Elevation: 2,895 ft (882 m)

Population (2009)
  - Total: 220,836
- Time zone: UTC+3
- Postal Code: 46016
- Area code: +964
- Language: [[Kurdish language Pshdare Accent
- Website: https://pshdarqaladze.netlify.app/

Pshdar District (Arabic: قضاء بشدر; Sorani Kurdish: قەزای پشدەر) is a district of the Sulaymaniyah Governorate in the Kurdistan Region, Iraq. It is located east of the city of Sulaymaniyah, near the Iranian border. The most populous urban centre in the district is Qeladizê, with 220,836 inhabitants.

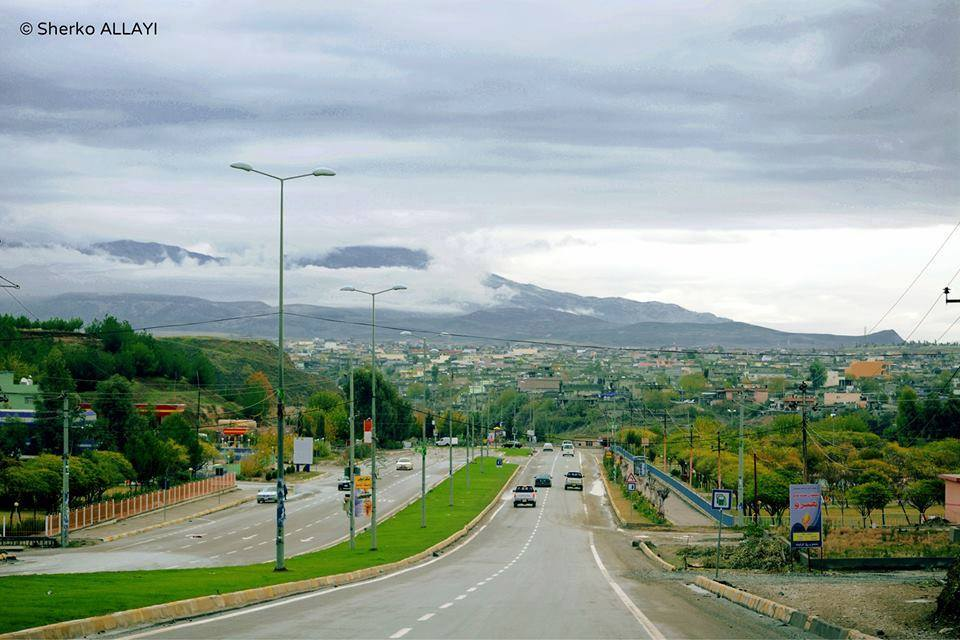
The city of Qaladiza
