= Qaladiza =

Qaladze قەڵادزێ قەڵادزە
- city
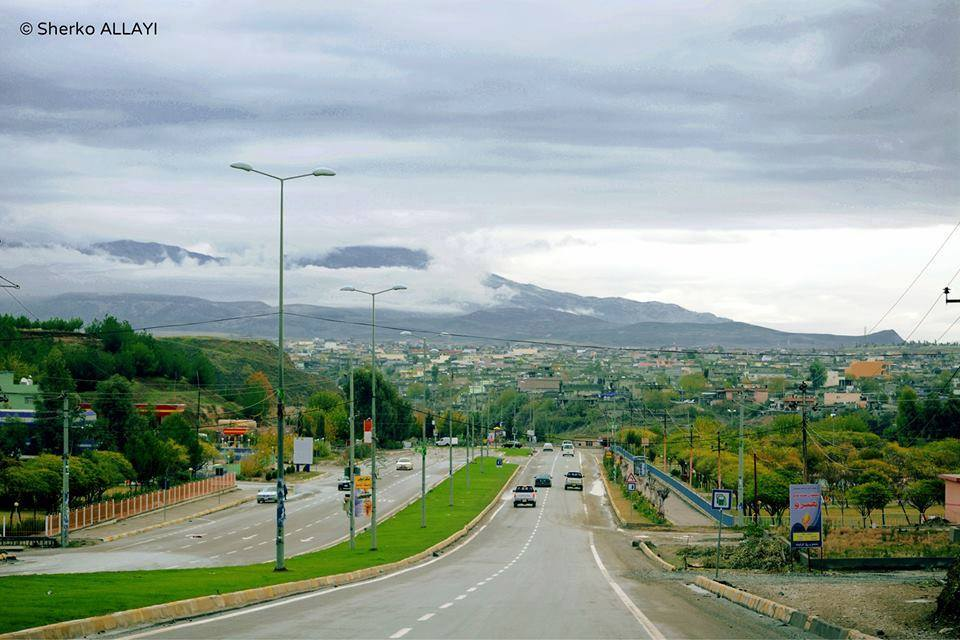

- Location within Iraq
- Coordinates: 36°11′00″N 45°07′40″E
- Country: Iraq
- Autonomous region: Kurdistan Region
- Governorate: Sulaymaniyah
- District: Pişder District
- Elevation: 2,895 ft (882 m)

Population (2025)
  - Total: 140,688
- Time zone: UTC+3
- Postal code: 46016
- Area code: +964
- Website: https://pshdarqaladze.netlify.app/

Qaladiza (Sorani Kurdish: قەڵادزێ, romanized: Qeladizê, Arabic: قلدز) is a town in Kurdistan Region, Iraq, north of Sulaymaniyah, near the Iranian border. It is surrounded by mountains like many parts of Kurdistan. The town is located in the middle of Pişder District.

The population of qaladiza is 140,688 people in 2025

== Etymology ==
Qeladizê means "Castle of Two Rivers" from the Kurdish words Qela = castle, du = two and zê = river. In the southwest of the city there is a castle between two rivers.

== History ==
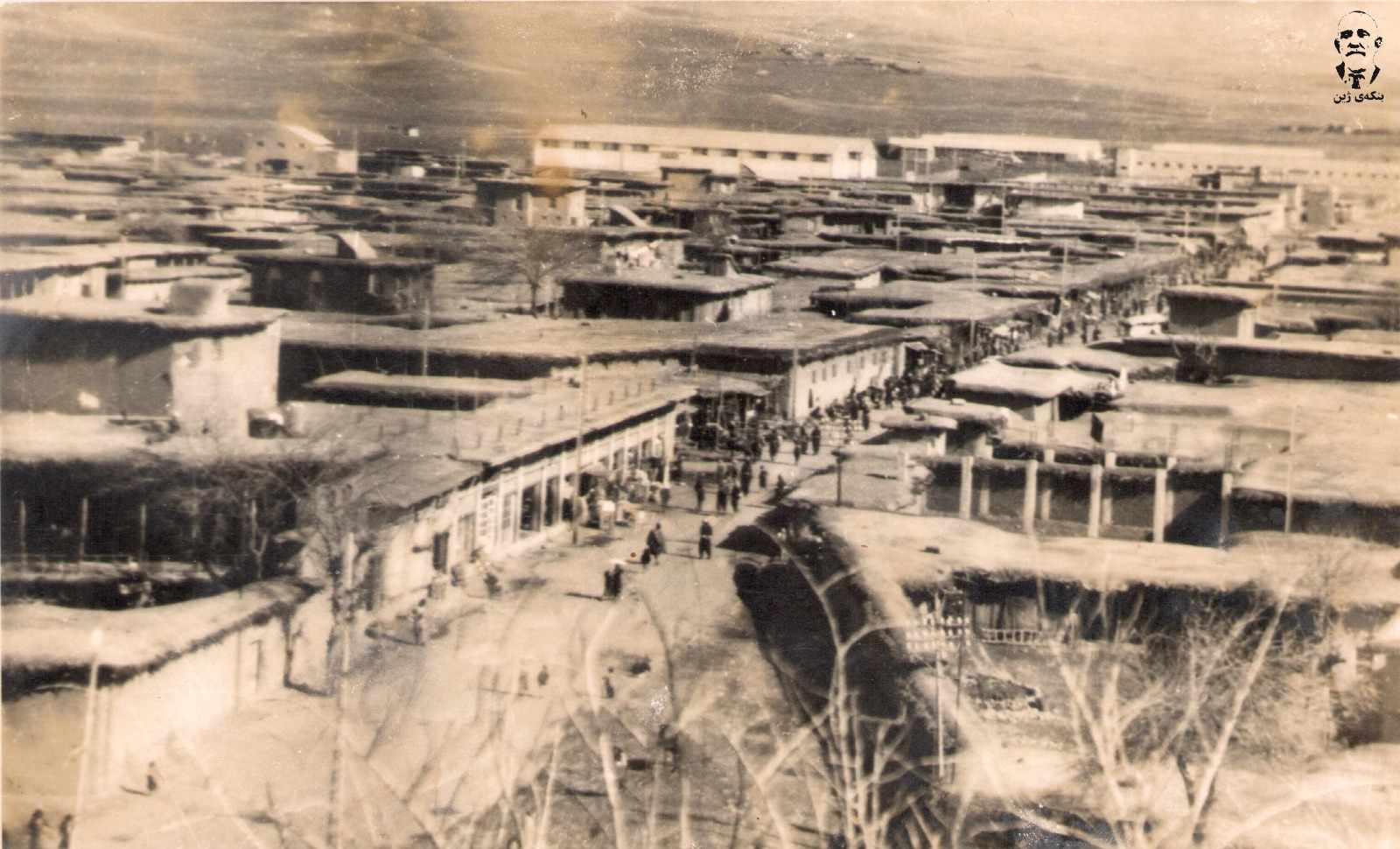
Qaladiza in 1958.

Qaladiza, located in the Kurdistan Region, has a rich historical backdrop. This section outlines the key events and transformations of Qaladiza from ancient history to its modern-day status.

=== Early history ===
==== Ancient Period ====
- Geographical Importance: Qaladiza lies in a mountainous area, offering natural defenses and strategic significance for early settlements.
- Early Inhabitants: The region has been inhabited since ancient times, possibly influenced by the Sumerians, Akkadians, and Assyrians due to its proximity to ancient Mesopotamian civilizations. It was eventually settled by the Medes who maintained their power in the region throughout the rule of the various Persian Empires.

=== Medieval Period ===
==== Islamic Era ====
- Islamic Conquests: Following the spread of Islam in the 7th century, Qaladiza became part of various Islamic Caliphates, including the Umayyad and Abbasid Caliphates.
- Kurdish Emirates: The area was governed by Kurdish emirates during the medieval period, with the Shaddadid and Rawadid dynasties playing key roles.

=== Ottoman Period (16th - Early 20th Century) ===
==== Ottoman Rule ====
- Administrative Structure: In the 16th century, Qaladiza became part of the Ottoman Empire, where local Kurdish leaders were given significant autonomy in exchange for loyalty and tribute.
- Tribal Influence: Kurdish tribal structures remained influential, with tribal leaders overseeing governance and tax collection under the Ottomans' indirect rule.

=== 20th century ===
==== British Mandate and Kingdom of Iraq (1920–1958) ====
- Post-Ottoman Transition: Following the Ottoman Empire's collapse after WWI, Qaladiza fell under the British Mandate of Mesopotamia. This led to significant political changes, including the formation of the Kingdom of Iraq in 1932.
- Kurdish Nationalism: This period marked the rise of Kurdish nationalism, with Qaladiza playing a role in the movement for greater autonomy within Iraq.

==== Republic of Iraq (1958–present) ====
Kurdish Rebellions and the Ba'athist Era (1958–2003)

- First Kurdish-Iraqi War (1961–1970): Qaladiza was a center for the Kurdish resistance during the First Kurdish-Iraqi War, which saw military clashes between Kurdish forces and the Iraqi government.
- Autonomy Agreement (1970): In 1970, a limited autonomy agreement was signed, granting Kurdish areas, including Qaladiza, some self-rule. However, its implementation was unsuccessful.
- Second Kurdish-Iraqi War (1974–1975): Renewed conflict in the 1970s led to further devastation in the region.
- Anfal Campaign (1986–1989): Under Saddam Hussein, the Ba'athist regime launched the genocidal Anfal Campaign against the Kurds, severely affecting Qaladiza with mass destruction and displacement.

Post-2003 and the Establishment of the Kurdistan Regional Government (KRG)

- US Invasion and Aftermath: The 2003 invasion of Iraq and the fall of Saddam Hussein's regime brought greater autonomy to the Kurdistan Region. Qaladiza benefited from US support and international protection, leading to stability in the region.
- Reconstruction and Development: Since 2003, significant reconstruction efforts have been undertaken in Qaladiza, improving infrastructure, healthcare, and education.
- Economic Growth: The town has experienced economic growth, benefiting from regional stability and investments in various sectors, including oil and infrastructure.

=== Cultural and Social Aspects ===
==== Education and Intellectual Contributions ====
- University of Raparin: The University of Raparin in Qaladiza serves as a major educational institution, contributing significantly to the region's intellectual development.
- Cultural Revival: A renewed focus on preserving Kurdish culture, language, and traditions has led to cultural festivals and events aimed at strengthening Kurdish identity.

==== Demographics and Social Structure ====
- Ethnic Composition: The majority of Qaladiza's population is Kurdish, with a strong connection to traditional Kurdish customs and values.
- Modernization and Urbanization: The town has experienced modernization, reflected in improved urban infrastructure, healthcare, and educational facilities.

=== Political Dynamics ===
==== Kurdish Political Movements ====
- Patriotic Union of Kurdistan (PUK): The PUK has been a dominant political force in Qaladiza, with strong support for its leaders and initiatives.
- Political Participation: The citizens of Qaladiza are actively involved in Kurdish politics, especially in the broader context of Iraq's Kurdish autonomy.

=== Contemporary Challenges and Prospects ===
==== Security and Stability ====
- Regional Tensions: Although Qaladiza enjoys relative stability, it remains vulnerable to broader regional tensions, particularly due to conflicts with neighboring countries.
- ISIS Threat: In 2014, the rise of ISIS posed a threat to the Kurdistan Region. Qaladiza was involved in the defense against the extremist group, demonstrating Kurdish resilience.

==== Future Prospects ====
- Sustainable Development: Qaladiza is focused on long-term development, with ongoing efforts to diversify its economy, improve infrastructure, and expand educational opportunities.

=== Conclusion ===
Qaladiza's history reflects its resilience and cultural significance. From ancient times through conflicts and struggles for autonomy, the town has maintained its Kurdish identity. Today, it stands as a symbol of reconstruction and progress within the Kurdistan Region of Iraq.

=== Qaladiza Under Saddam Hussein's Regime ===
In the 1980s, Qaladiza faced brutal repression under Saddam Hussein's Ba'athist government. The town was destroyed during the Iran–Iraq War in the 1980s, and its residents were forcibly displaced. Most were relocated to camps near Bazzian and other parts of Iraqi Kurdistan. They remained there until the Kurdish 1991 uprising against the Ba'athist Iraqi government.

On 24 April 1974, the town of Qaladiza was bombed by Saddam Hussein's regime. This bombing targeted the town in retaliation for the relocation of the University of Sulaimania to Qaladiza, a political move seen as a show of solidarity with Kurdish rebel leader Mustafa Barzani's resistance efforts. Over 425 students and teachers from the university were relocated. The bombing killed at least 400 people and left the town in ruins. Eight years later, in 1982, a protest commemorating victims of the Qaladze bombing turned violent when Iraqi security forces opened fire on demonstrators. The incident deepened existing trauma and reflected the Ba’ath regime’s repression of Kurdish identity and public remembrance.

On 10 February 2013, the Kurdistan Regional Government declared 24 April as University Martyrs Day, in commemoration of the victims of the Qaladiza bombing.

Qaladiza was also targeted during Saddam Hussein's Anfal Campaign, which sought to exterminate the local Kurdish population. Many residents were killed or disappeared in these attacks.

The bombing of Qaladiza remains one of the most tragic chapters in the town's history.

== Climate ==
Qaladiza has a hot-summer Mediterranean (Csa) according to Köppen climate classification with hot, dry summers and cool, rainy winters. Winter nights average below freezing and snow occasionally occurs.

Climate data for Qaladiza
Month	Jan	Feb	Mar	Apr	May	Jun	Jul	Aug	Sep	Oct	Nov	Dec	Year
Mean daily maximum °C (°F)	9.6 (49.3)	11.2 (52.2)	15.8 (60.4)	21.6 (70.9)	28.7 (83.7)	35.4 (95.7)	39.3 (102.7)	39.3 (102.7)	35.1 (95.2)	28.5 (83.3)	19.4 (66.9)	12.1 (53.8)	24.7 (76.4)
Daily mean °C (°F)	5.1 (41.2)	6.4 (43.5)	10.5 (50.9)	15.8 (60.4)	21.7 (71.1)	27.9 (82.2)	31.6 (88.9)	31.5 (88.7)	27.2 (81.0)	21.2 (70.2)	13.7 (56.7)	7.3 (45.1)	18.3 (65.0)
Mean daily minimum °C (°F)	0.6 (33.1)	1.6 (34.9)	5.3 (41.5)	10 (50)	14.8 (58.6)	20.4 (68.7)	23.9 (75.0)	23.8 (74.8)	19.3 (66.7)	14 (57)	8 (46)	2.6 (36.7)	12.0 (53.6)
Average rainfall mm (inches)	144 (5.7)	174 (6.9)	129 (5.1)	85 (3.3)	41 (1.6)	0 (0)	0 (0)	0 (0)	1 (0.0)	8 (0.3)	70 (2.8)	104 (4.1)	756 (29.8)
Source: Climate-Data

== gallery ==
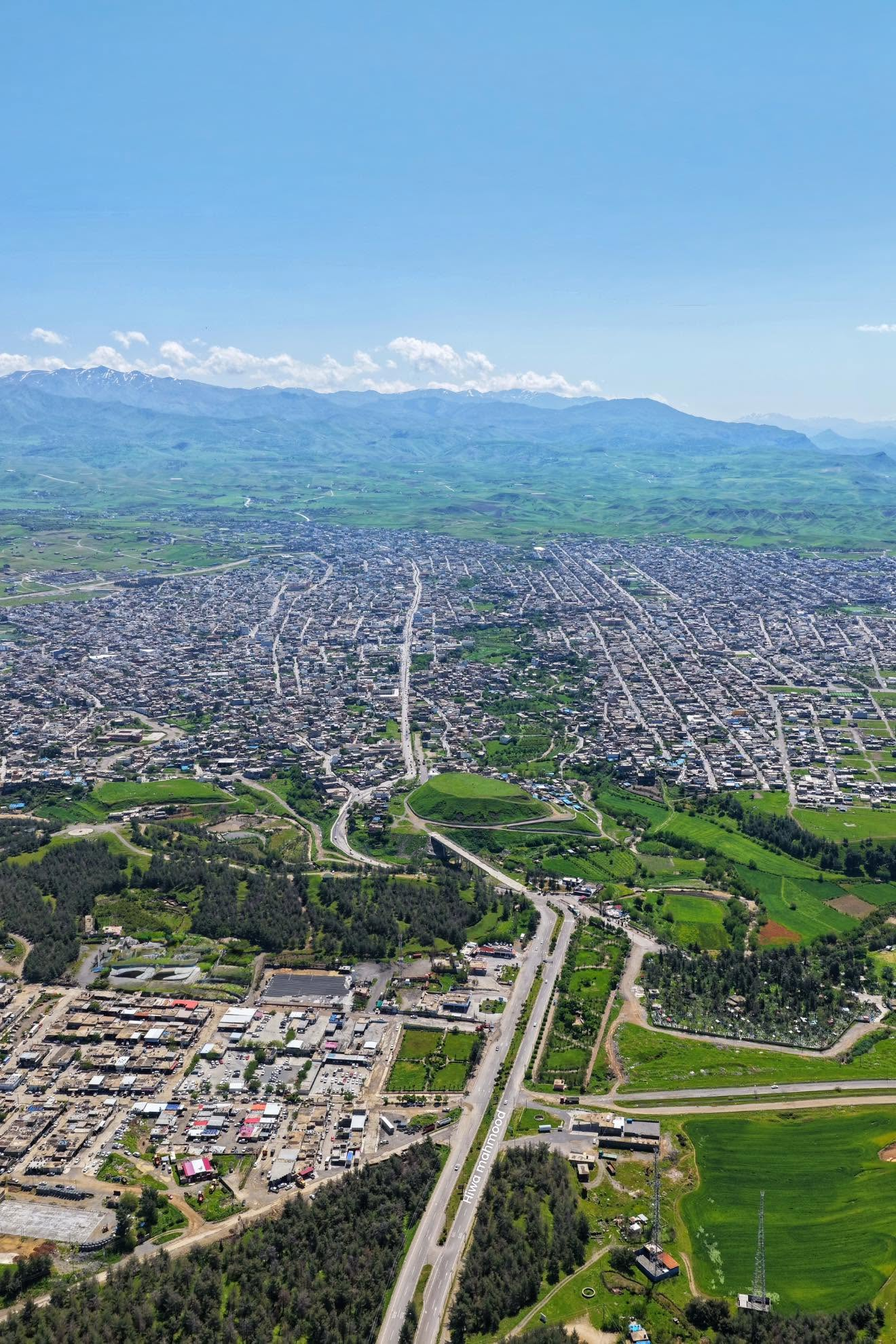

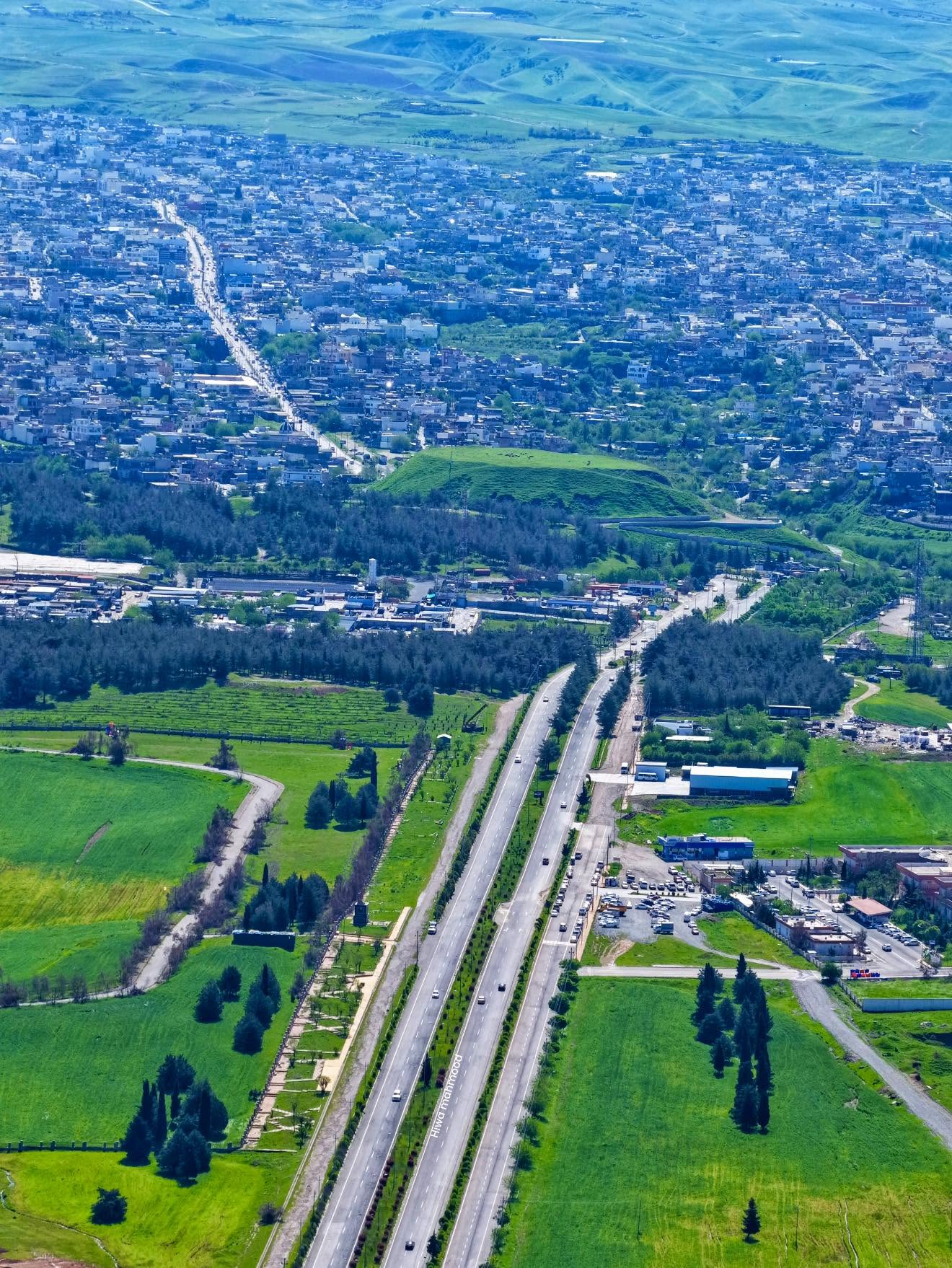

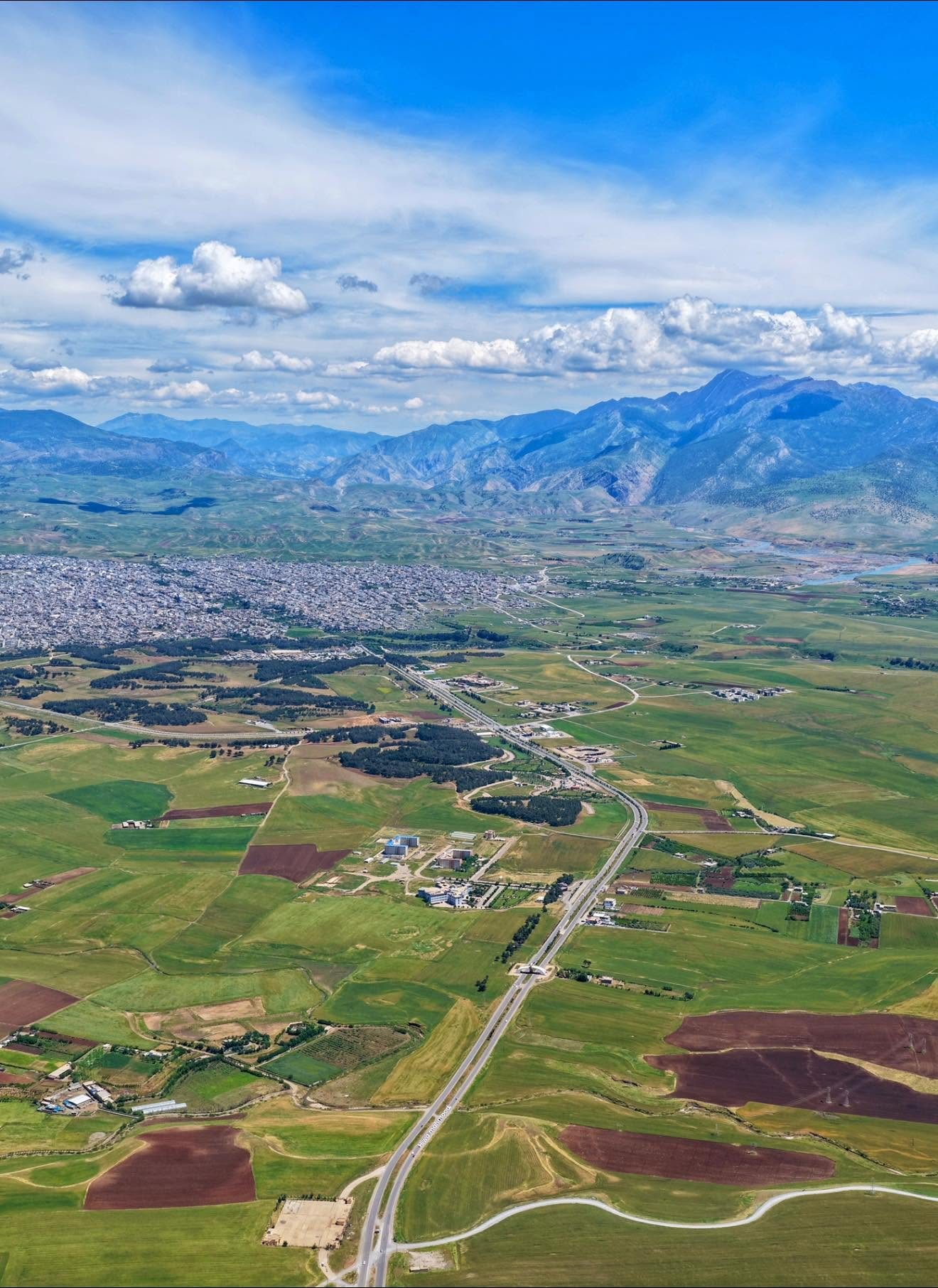

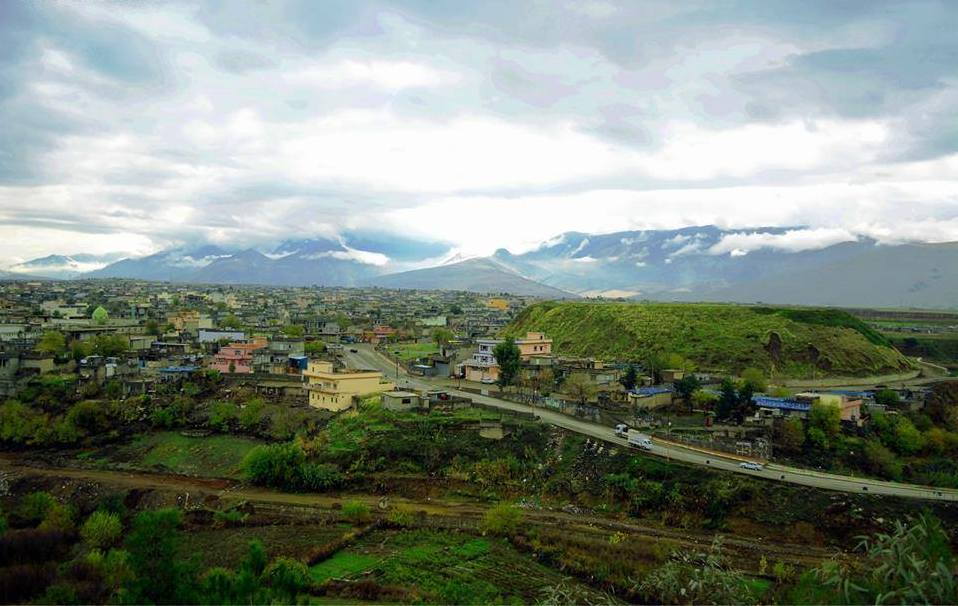

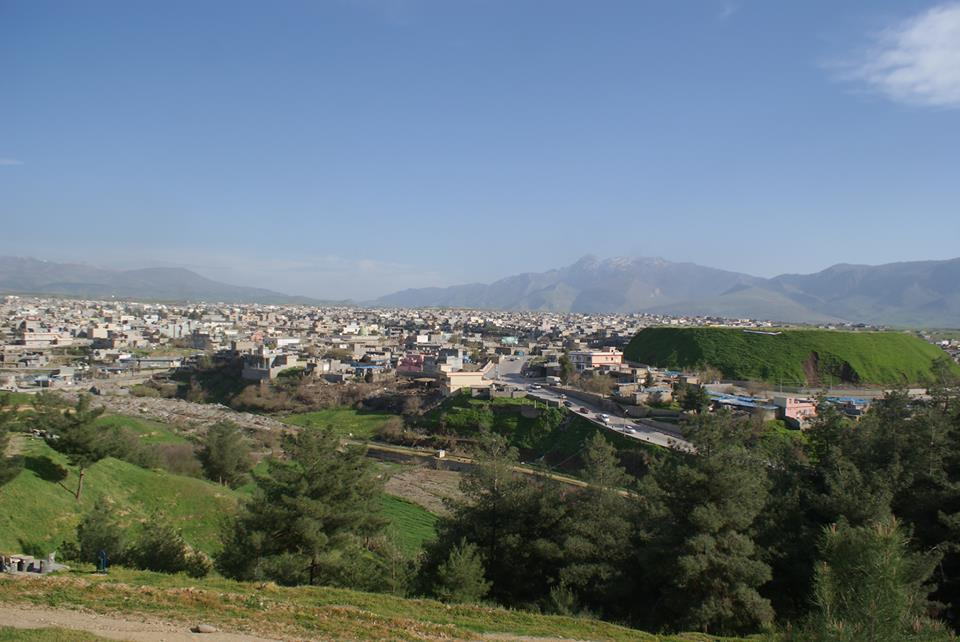

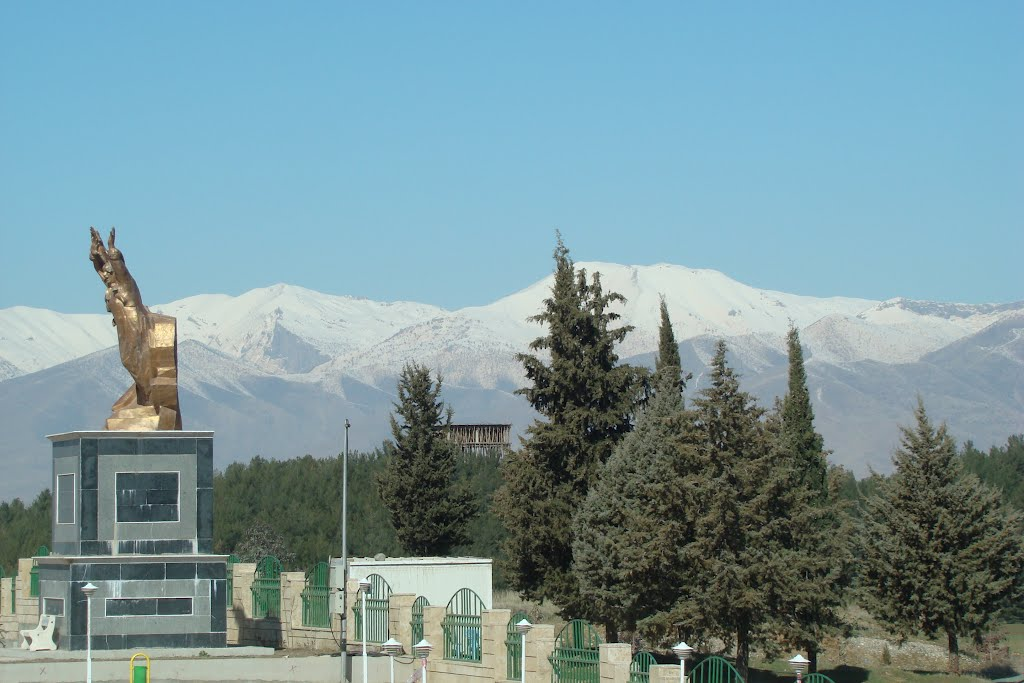

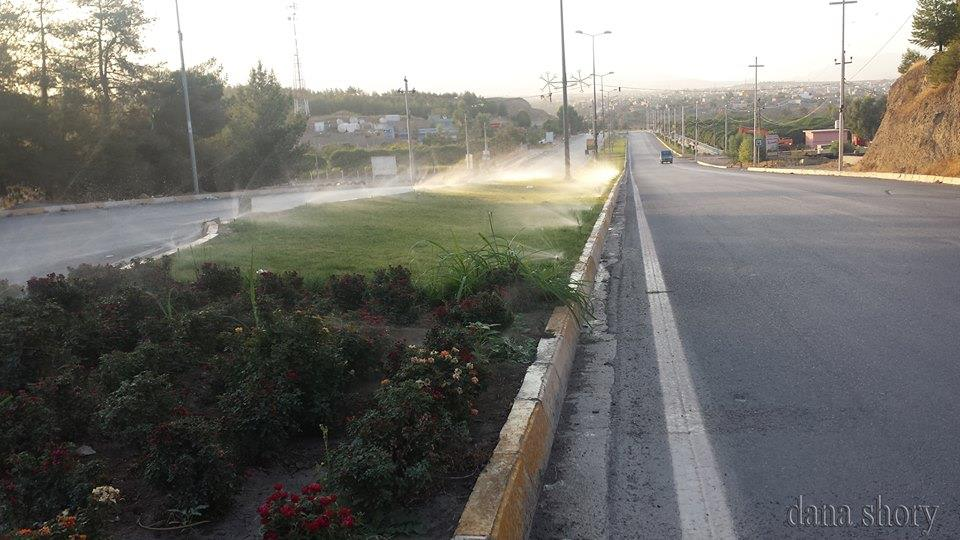

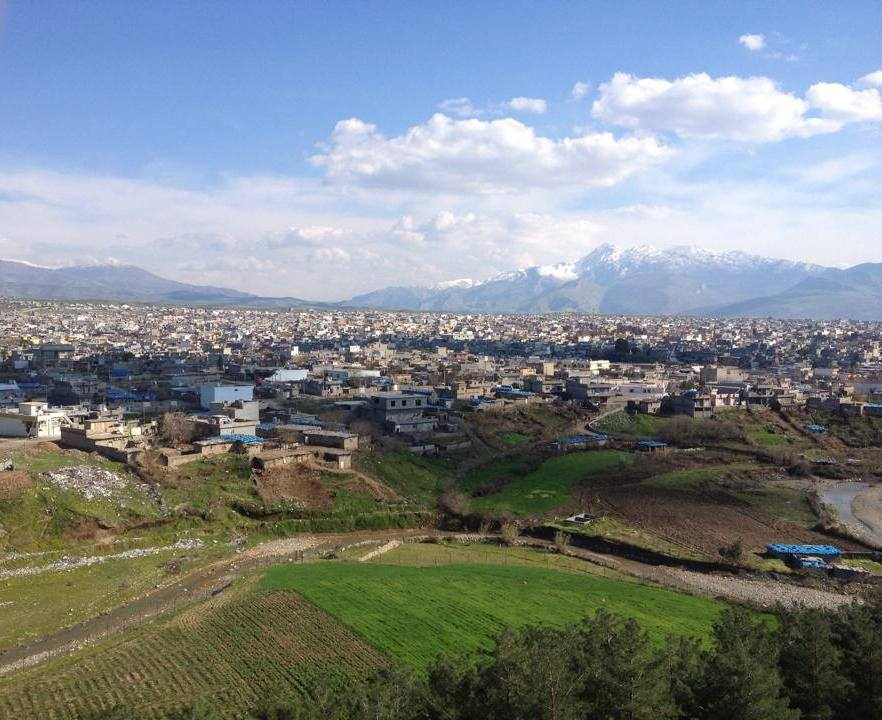
