= Kawa Garmeyani =

Iraqi journalist

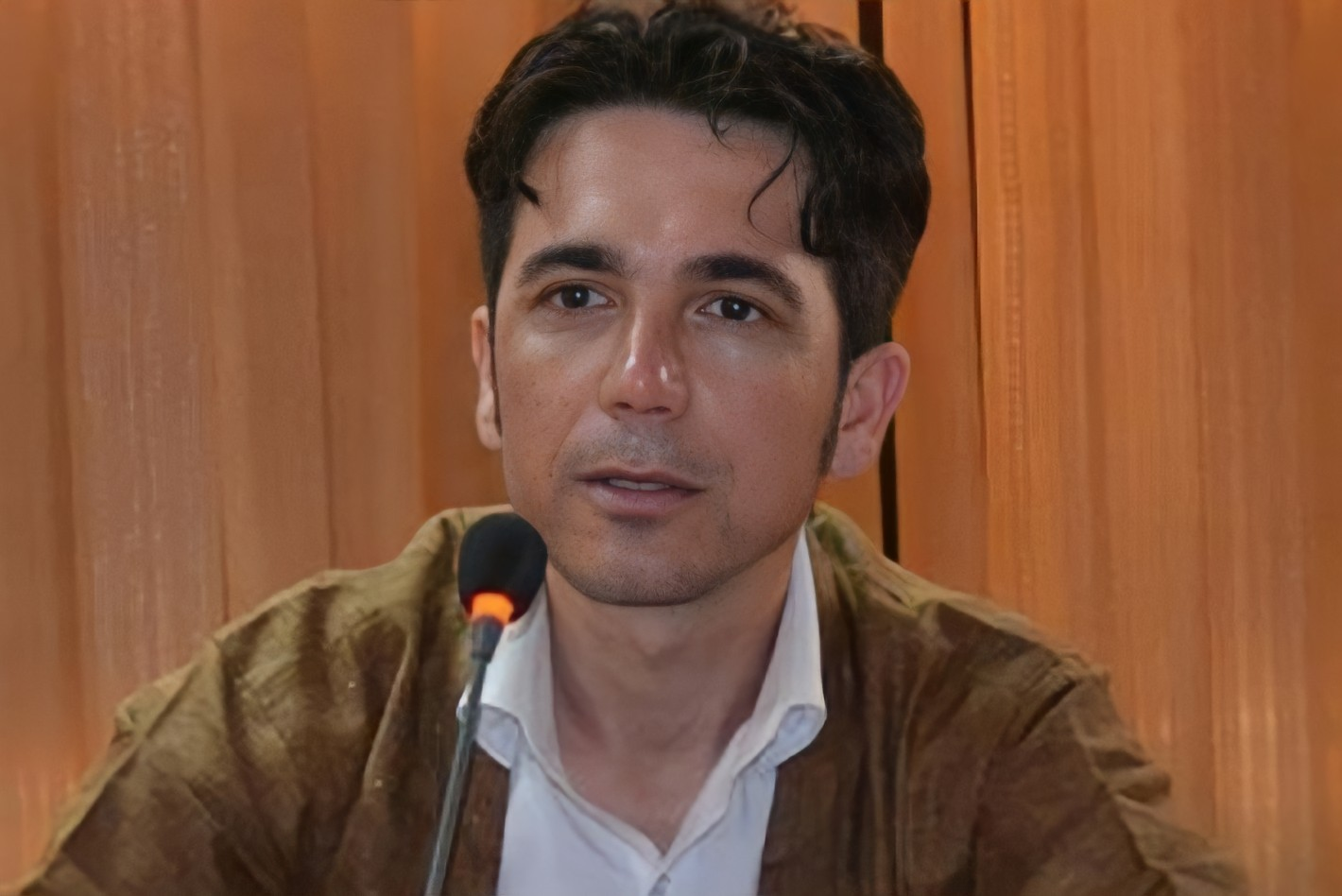
- Born: 1981; Kalar
- Died: 5 December 2013 (aged 32); Kalar
- Occupation: Journalist

Kawa Mohamed Ahmed Garmeyani, (1981 – 5 December 2013) well known as Kawa Garmeyani (Kurdish:کاوە محمد ئەحمەد گەرمیانی, Arabic:كاوه محمد أحمد كرمياني) was an Iraqi Kurdish journalist. Garmeyani came to prominence after he was assassinated in front of his house in Kalar, which occurred in the wake of announcing his intentions to release an article implicating high ranking officials in various corruption scandals. Soon after his killing, his family claimed involvement of political parties in Kurdistan Region, especially Patriotic Union of Kurdistan.
