= Darbandikhan =

Darbandikhan دەربەندیخان Derbendîxan
- Town
- Nickname: Derben
- Interactive map of Darbandikhan
- Location of Darbandikhan, Iraq Darbandikhan (Iraq)
- Coordinates: 35.116258°N 45.686245°E
- Country: Iraq
- Autonomous region: Kurdistan
- Governorate: Sulaymaniyah Governorate
- District: Darbandokeh District

Darbandikhan (Kurdish: دەربەندیخان, romanized: Derbendîxan) is a town in the Governorate of Sulaimaniyah in Kurdistan Region, Iraq. It is situated within the area of autonomy for the Kurdistan region of Iraq, inhabited by the majority of the Kurds. Darbandikhan is located close to Darbandikhan Lake (35.152477°N 45.795021°E), and on the border with Diyala Governorate. It has a population of 56,146 as of 2024.

== 24e also ==
- Darbandikhan Dam
- Diyala River
