= Darbandikhan District =

Darbandikhan District قەزای دەربەندیخان
- District
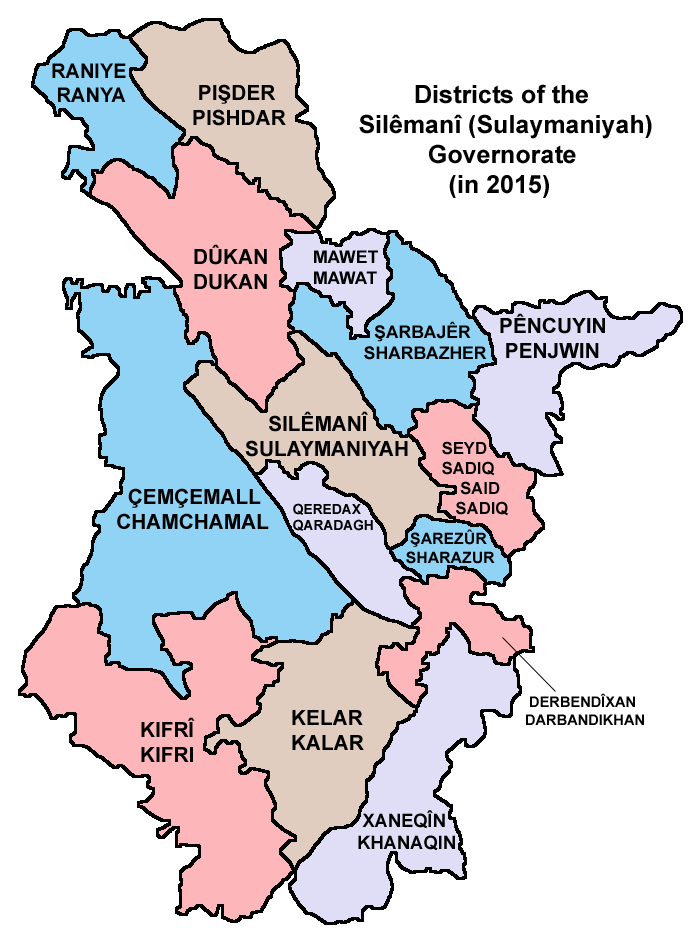
- Districts of the Sulaymaniyah Governorate
- Interactive map of Darbandikhan District
- Coordinates: 35°08′N 45°42′E
- Country: Iraq
- Autonomous region: Kurdistan
- Governorate: Sulaymaniyah
- Seat: Darbandikhan
- Time zone: UTC+3 (AST)

Darbandokeh District (Kurdish: قەزای دەربەندیخان, romanized: Qezay Derbendîxan) is a district of the Sulaymaniyah Governorate in Kurdistan Region, Iraq. Its main town is Darbandikhan. In the last Iraqi census conducted in 2024, the district had a population of 56,146.
