= Kalar District =

Kalar District قەزای کەلار
- District
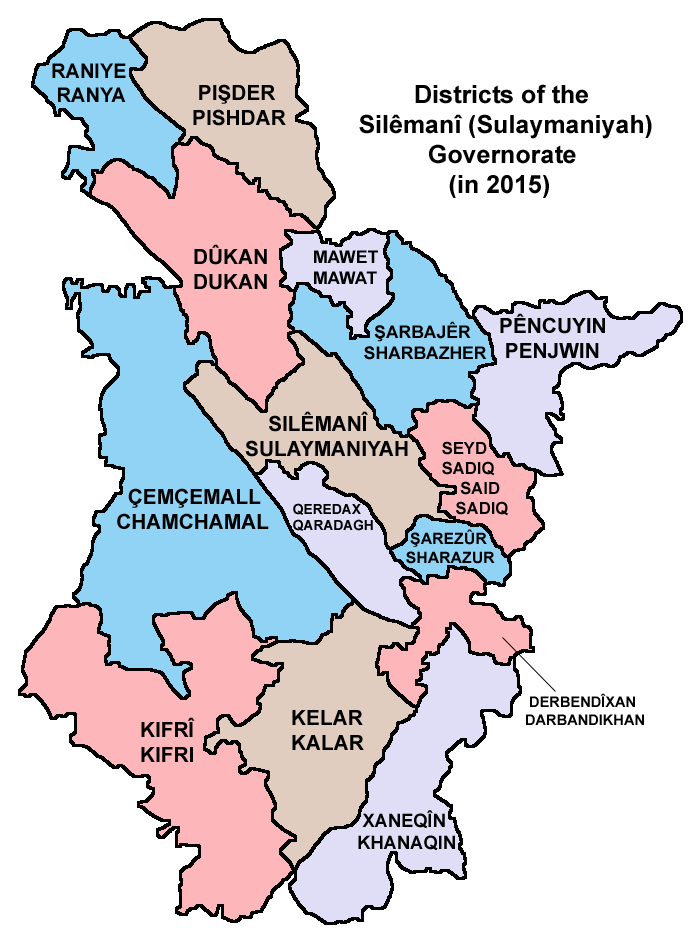
- Districts of the Sulaymaniyah Governorate
- Country: Iraq
- Autonomous region: Kurdistan
- Governorate: Sulaymaniyah
- Elevation: 2,895 ft (882 m)
- Language: Kurdish

Kalar District (Kurdish: قەزای کەلار, romanized: Qezay Kelar) is a district of the Sulaymaniyah Governorate in Kurdistan Region, Iraq. In the last Iraqi census conducted in 2024, the district had a population of 213,452. The city of Kalar is the centre of the district with a population of 147,530.
