= Sharbazher District =

Sharbazher District قەزای شارباژێڕ
- District
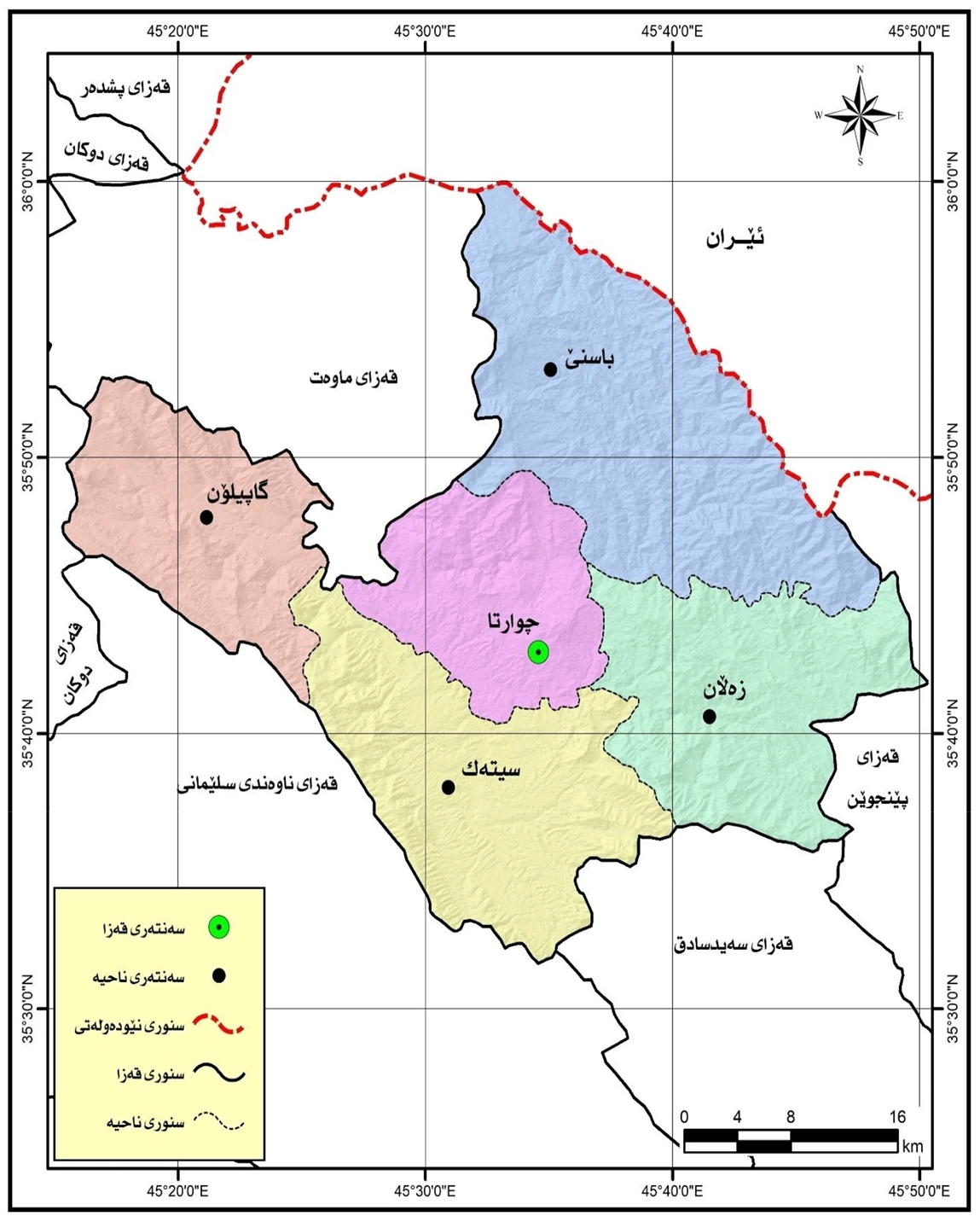
- Detailed map of Sharbazher District, also showing the subdistricts of the district.

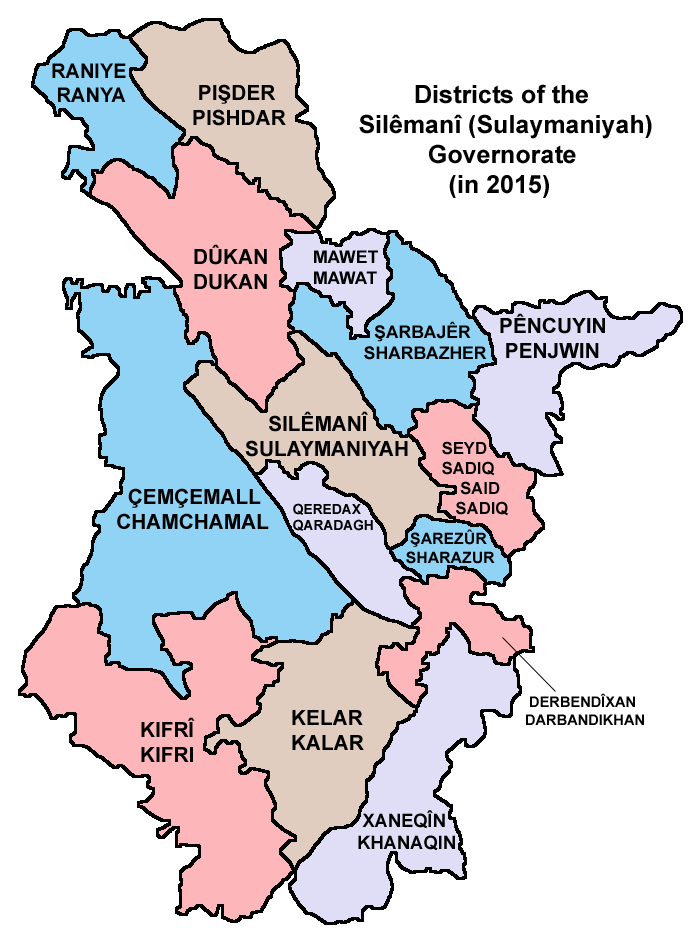
- Districts of the Sulaymaniyah Governorate
- Interactive map of Sharbazher District
- Coordinates: 35°42′N 45°35′E
- Country: Iraq
- Autonomous region: Kurdistan
- Governorate: Sulaymaniyah Governorate
- Time zone: UTC+3 (AST)

Sharbazher District (Kurdish: قەزای شارباژێڕ, romanized: Qezay Şarbajêr) is a district of Sulaymaniyah Governorate in the Kurdistan Region, Iraq. It refers to the lands north of Sulaymaniyah or the lands behind the goyzha mountain.

== Sharbazher ==
Sharbazher (Kurdish: شارباژێڕ ,Şarbajêr) is a town in the district.
