= Sulaymaniyah Governorate =

Governorate of Iraq

Sulaymaniyah Governorate Kurdish: پارێزگای سلێمانی Arabic: محافظة السليمانية
- Governorate
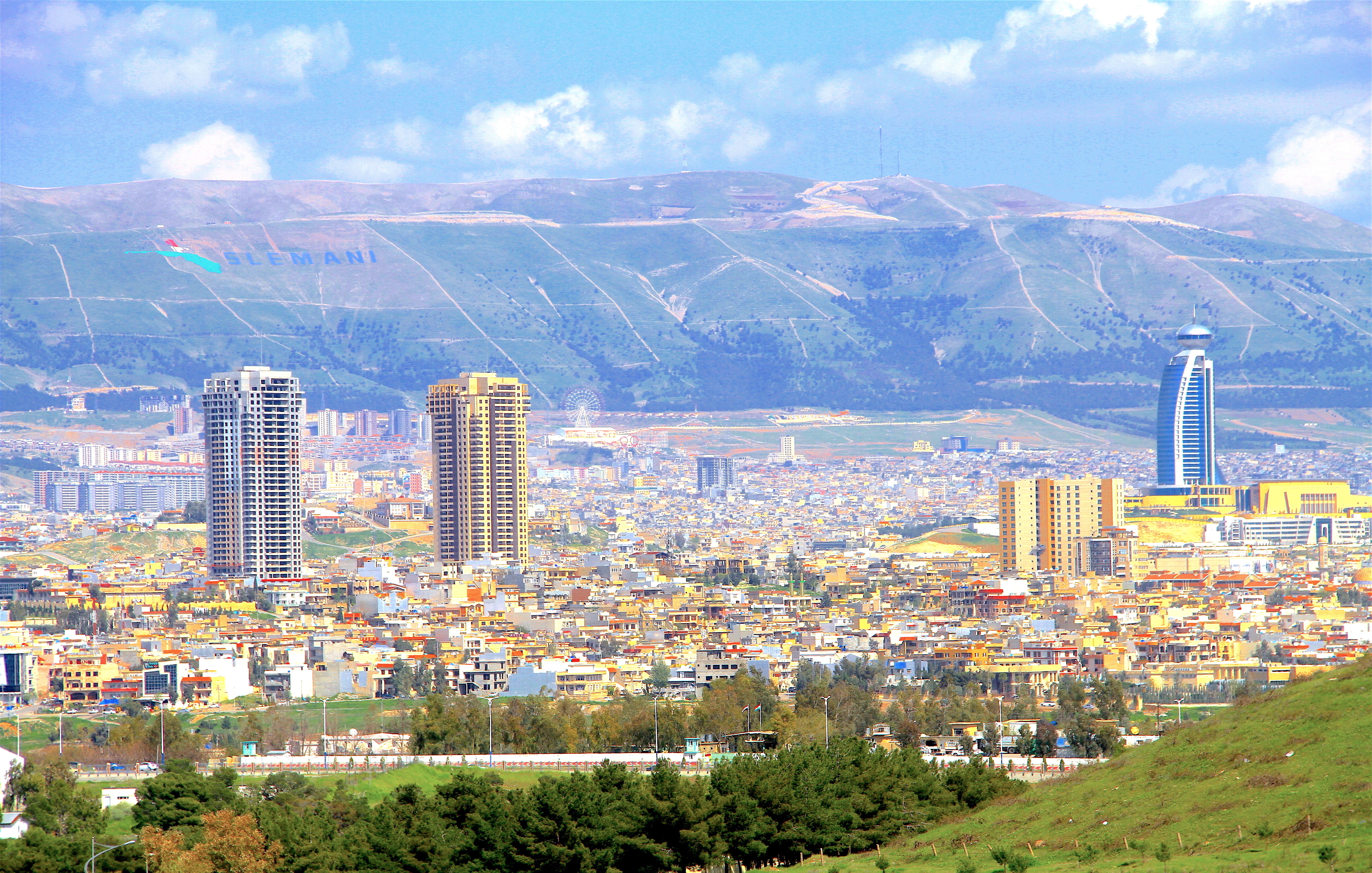
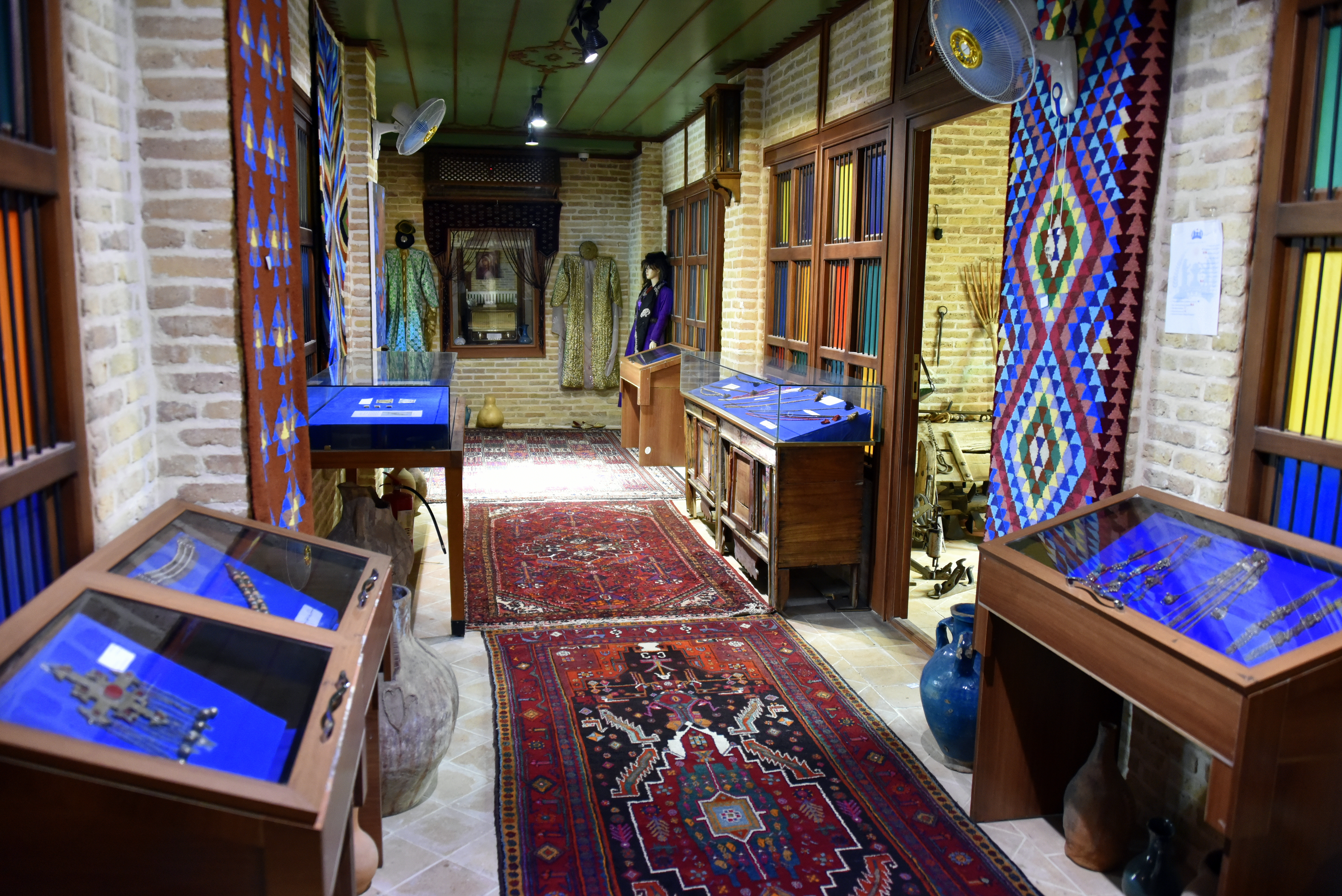
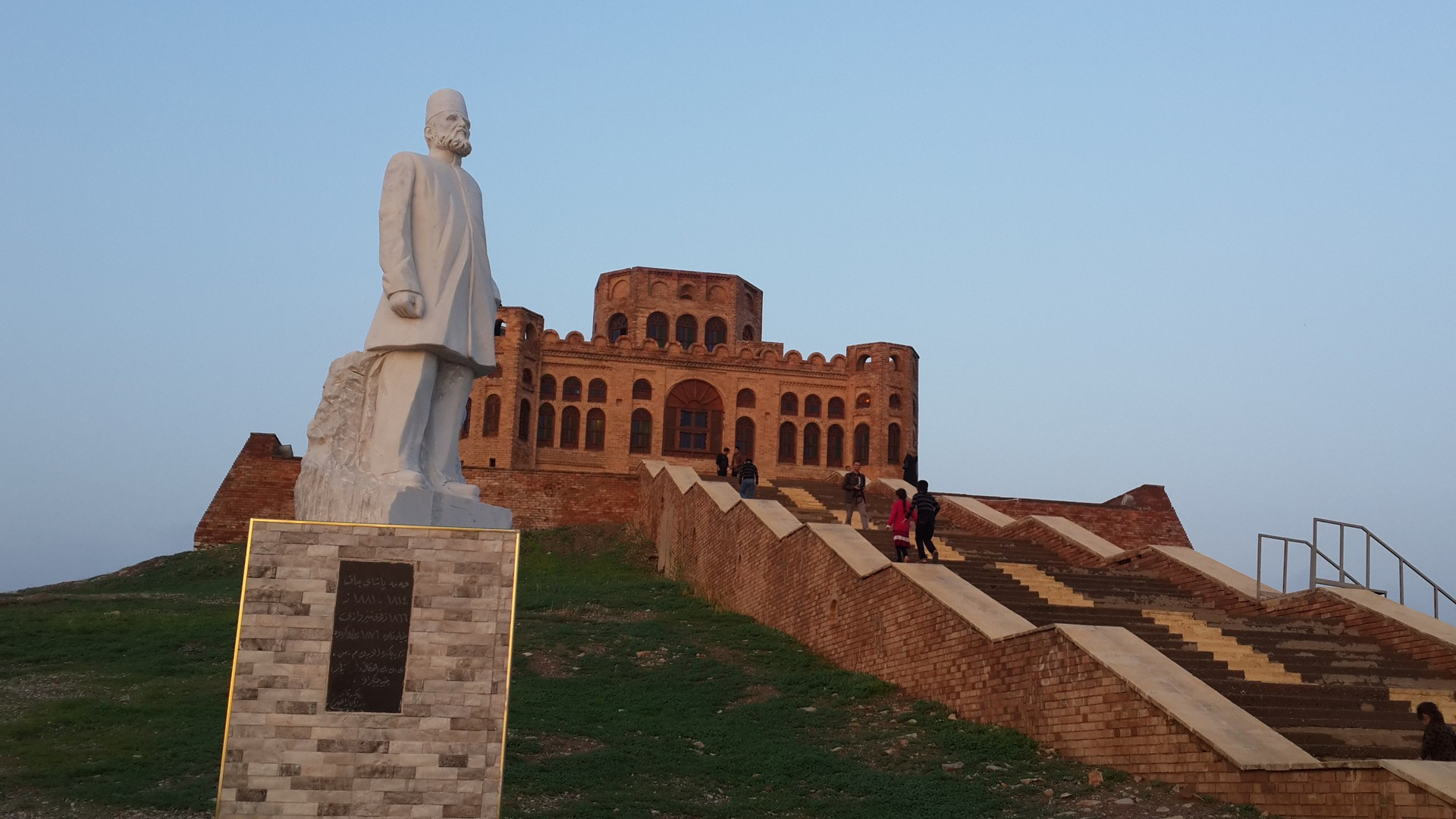
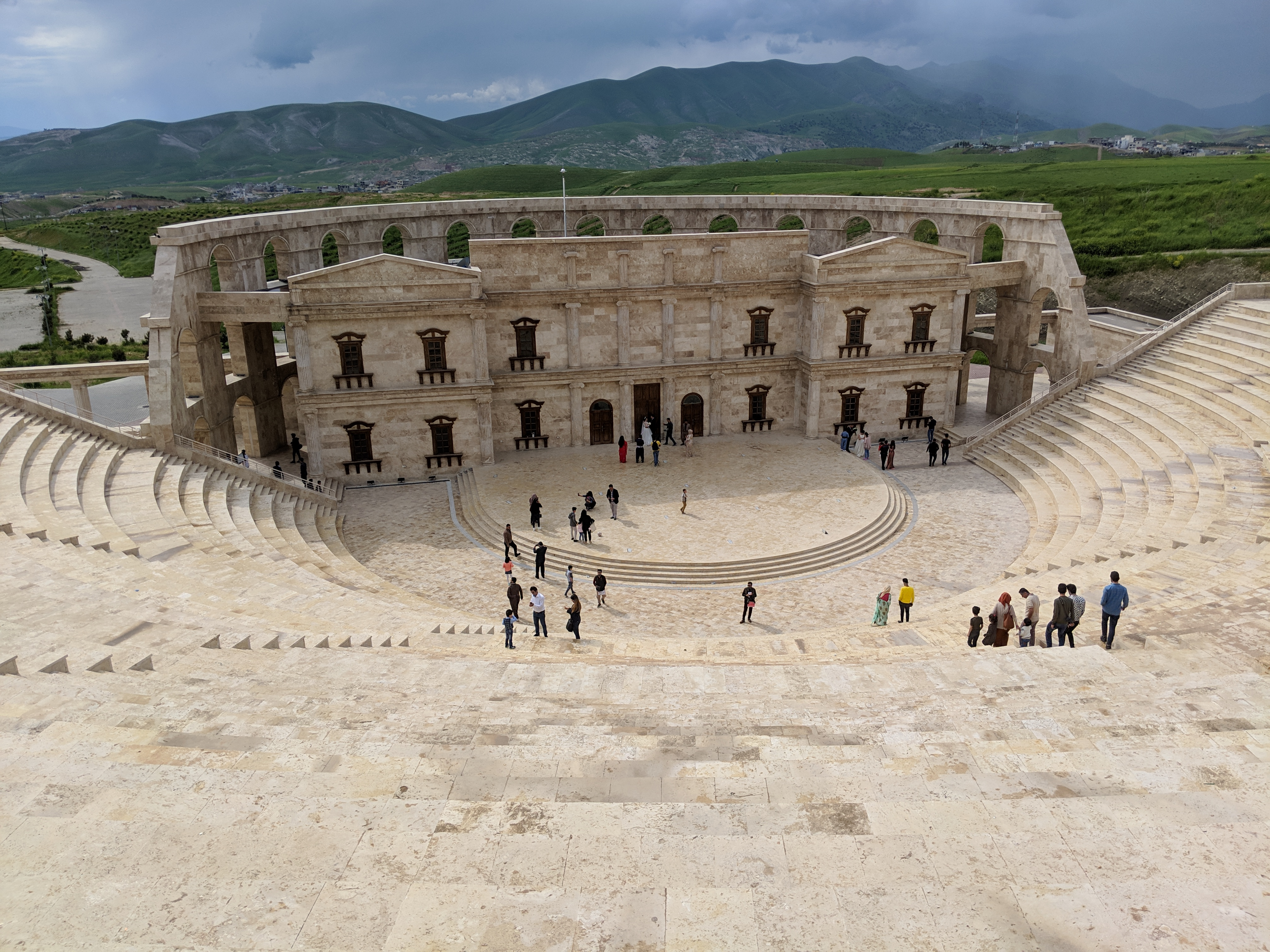
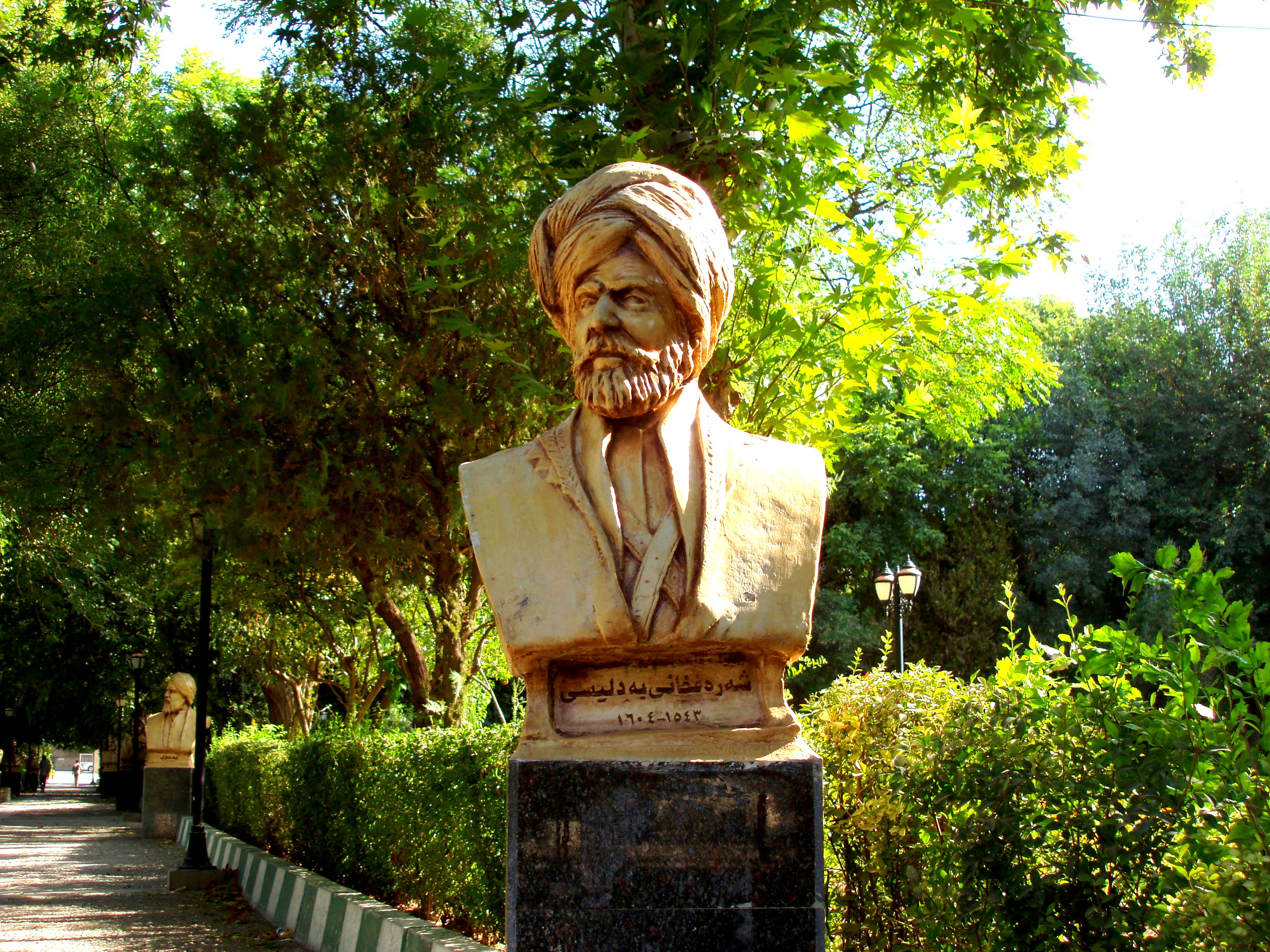
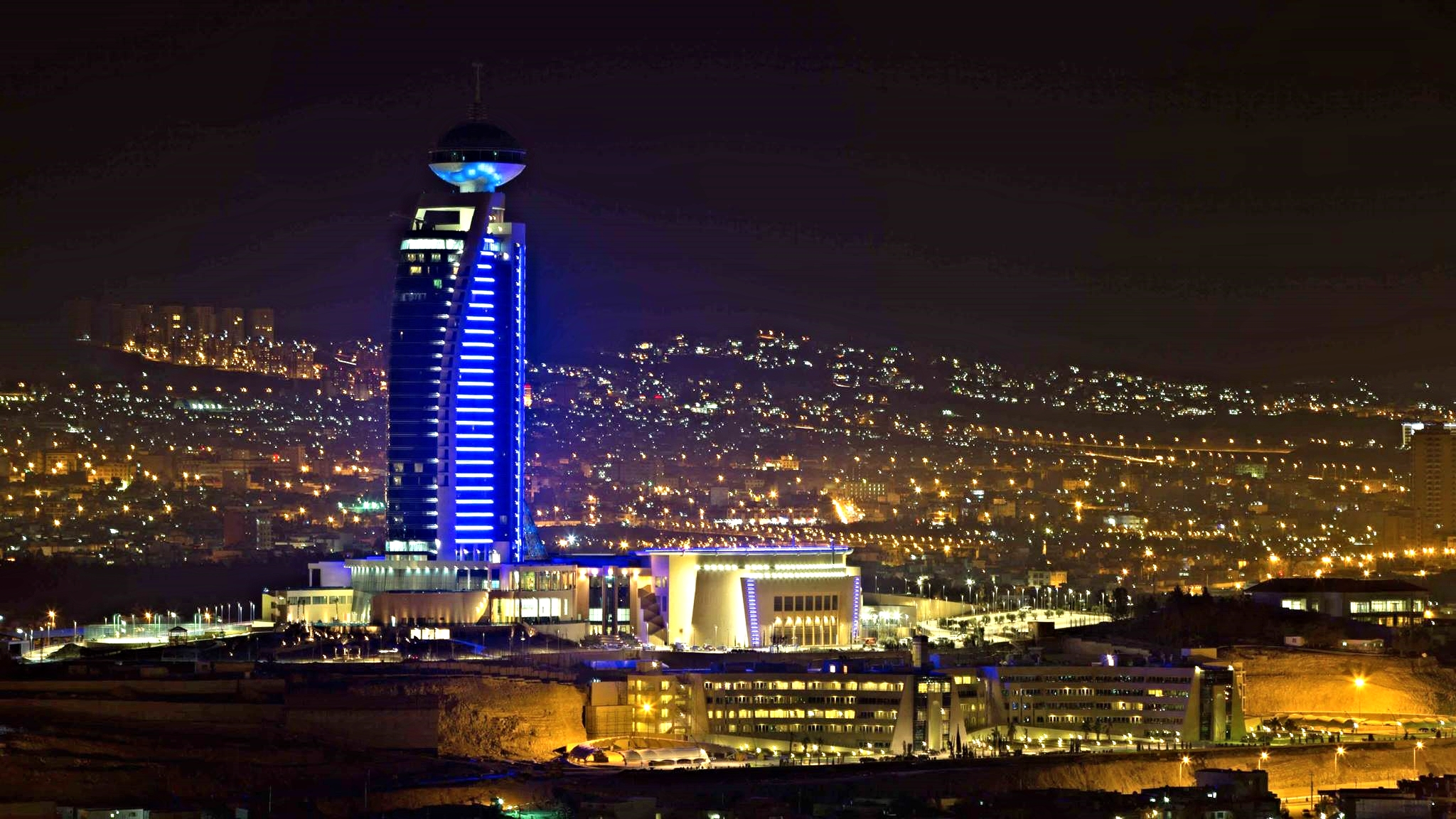
- Top-bottom, R-L: View over Suleymaniyah; Sulaymaniyah Museum • Sherwana Castle; Roman amphitheater • Sharafkhan Bidlisi statue Suleymaniyah at night Clockwise, from left: Sulaymaniyah with Dukan Lake, Halabja and Ranya

- Location of the Sulaymaniyah Governorate (red) – in Iraq (red, beige & light grey) – in the Kurdistan Region (red & beige)

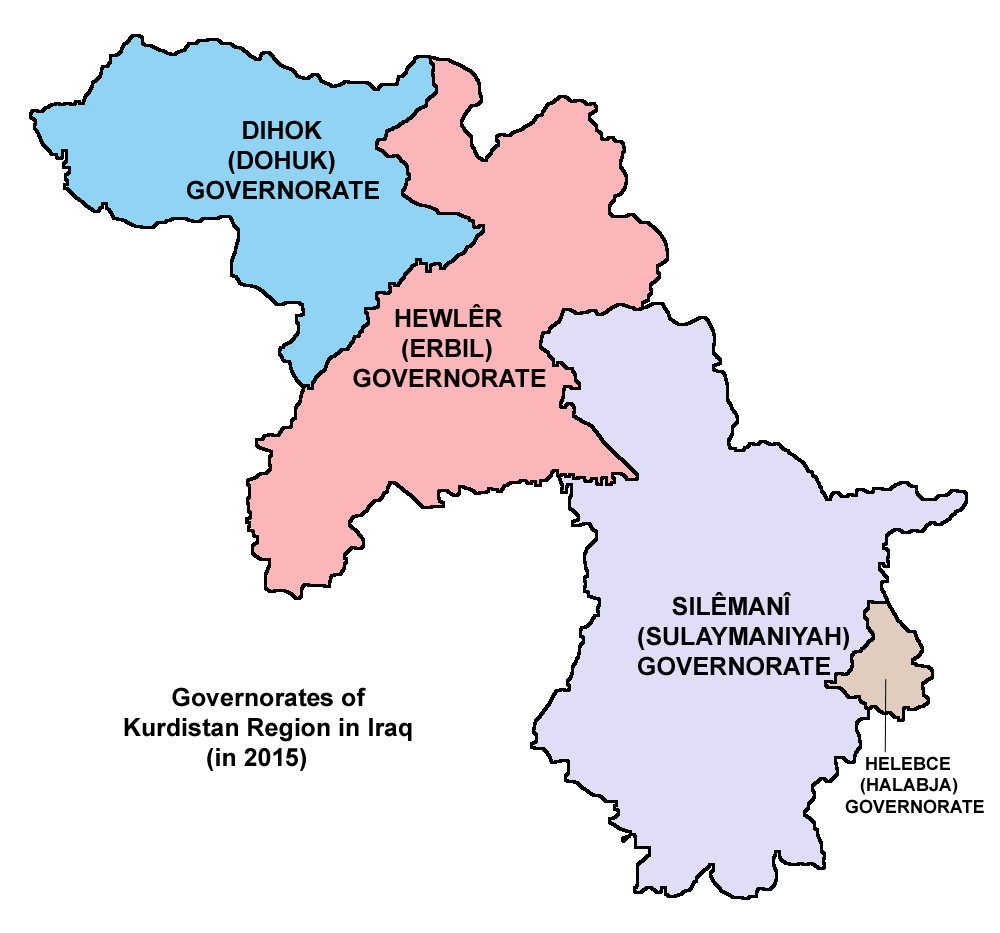
- Sulaymaniyah Governorate within the Kurdistan Region
- Interactive map of Sulaymaniyah Governorate
- Coordinates: 35°31′N 45°19′E
- Country: Iraq
- Federal region: Kurdistan Region
- Capital: Sulaymaniyah

Government
  - Type: provincial government
  - Body: Sulaymaniyah Provincial Council
  - Governor: Haval Abubakir
  - Deputy Governor: Shaho Osman

Area
  - Total: 20,143.91 km^{2} (7,777.61 sq mi)

Population (2024 census)
  - Total: 2,287,798
  - Density: 113.5727/km^{2} (294.1519/sq mi)
- ISO 3166 code: IQ-SU
- HDI (2024): 0.737 high · 3rd of 18
- Website: www.slemani.gov.krd

Sulaymaniyah Governorate (Sorani Kurdish: پارێزگای سلێمانی; Kurmanji Kurdish: Parêzgeha Silêmaniyê; Arabic: محافظة السليمانية) or Sulaymaniyah Province is a governorate in the Kurdistan Region of Iraq. Its capital and largest city is Sulaymaniyah. Halabja Governorate was formerly the Halabja District of Sulaymaniyah, until it became a separate governorate in 2014.

== Provincial government ==
- Governor: Haval Abubakir
- Deputy Governor: Shaho Osman
- Provincial Council Chairman (PCC): Azad Mohammad Amin

== Districts ==
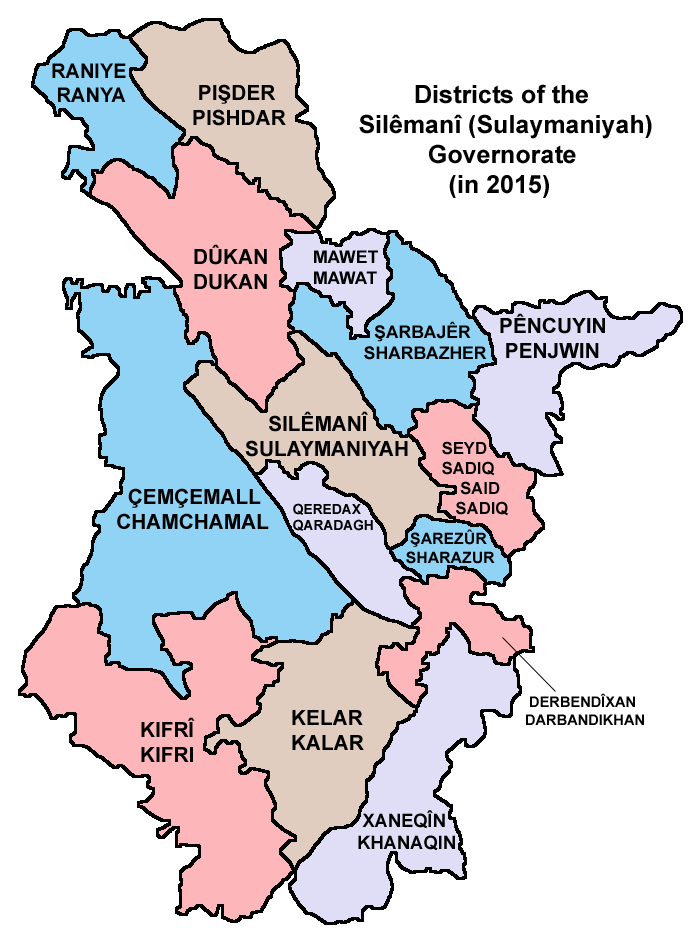
Districts of the Sulaymaniyah Governorate

District	Sub-districts	Capital
Çemçemal	Şiwan	Çemçemal
Çemçemal	Axceler	Çemçemal
Çemçemal	Takiya	Çemçemal
Çemçemal	Sengaw	Çemçemal
Çemçemal	Qadirkerem	Çemçemal
Derbendîxan	Derbendîxan	Derbendîxan
Derbendîxan	Bawa Khoshen	Derbendîxan
Dokan	Surdaş	Dokan
Dokan	Çinaran	Dokan
Dokan	Bingrd	Dokan
Dokan	Xidran	Dokan
Dokan	Pîremegrun	Dokan
Kelar	Kelar	Kalar
Kelar	Pebaz	Kalar
Kelar	Şêx Tawil	Kalar
Kelar	Rizgarî	Kalar
Xaneqîn (northern part only; mostly disputed)	Qoratu	Meydan
Xaneqîn (northern part only; mostly disputed)	Meydan	Meydan
Kifrî (mostly disputed)	not determined	Kifrî
Mawet		Mawet
Pênciwên	Germik	Pênciwên
Pênciwên	Nalparêz	Pênciwên
Pişder	Hêro	Qeladizê
Pişder	Nawdeşt	Qeladizê
Pişder	Helşo	Qeladizê
Pişder	Jarawe	Qeladizê
Pişder	Esewa	Qeladizê
Qeredax		Qeredax
Ranye	Çwarqurne	Ranya
Ranye	Bêtwate	Ranya
Ranye	Hacîyawa	Ranya
Ranye	Serkepkan	Ranya
Seyid Sadiq	Siruchik	Seyid Sadiq
Seyid Sadiq	Berzince	Seyid Sadiq
Şarezûr		Zerayan
Şarbajêrr	Zalan	Şarbajêrr
Şarbajêrr	Jejla	Şarbajêrr
Şarbajêrr	Sîweyil	Şarbajêrr
Şarbajêrr	Sîtek	Şarbajêrr
Şarbajêrr	Gapîlon	Şarbajêrr
Silêmanî	Bazyan	Silêmanî
Silêmanî	Tancero	Silêmanî
Silêmanî	Bekreco	Silêmanî

== Geography ==
Sulaymaniyah Governorate lies in the southeastern part of the Kurdistan Region of Iraq, bordered by Iranian Kurdistan to the east, Kirkuk to the west, Halabja to the southeast, and Erbil to the northwest. It is one of the most culturally and geographically diverse areas of Kurdistan, known for its rolling green mountains, fertile plains, deep valleys, and a climate that shifts dramatically between the lowlands and the high ranges.

The governorate is the largest by area in the Kurdistan Region of Iraq, and its landscape can be divided broadly into three zones:

1. The northern and eastern highlands marked by rugged mountain ranges. Stretching from Pishdar and Sharbazher regions in the north to Penjwen and Hawraman in the east and southeast along the Iranian border to outlier ranges such as Piramagrun and Qaradagh mountains in the west and southwest. Part of the great Zagros Mountains, the highlands are known for their steep mountain chains, deep valleys, cool climate and rich biodiversity. Elevations here range from 1200 m to over 3000 meters above sea level, creating dramatic contrasts in both temperature and vegetation.
2. The central hills and valleys zone as two somewhat disjointed enclaves separated by a narrow valley between the Piramagrun and Haibat Sultan mountain chains. The northern zone is the basin of Lake Dukan including the Ranya and Pishdar plains in the north-northeast, to the town of Dukan in the south, and the Little Zab river valley. The southern zone is the heartland of the governorate and the most populated area, stretching from the Azmar-Goizha mountain chain in the north to the Sirwan river basin in the south, and from Darbandikhan Lake in the west to Penjwen's foothills in the east, including most of the fertile Sharazur plain and the cultural center of the governorate itself: Sulaymaniyah. It's a transitional landscape between the mountains and the plains, characterized by elevations from 400 to 1200 m above sea level, moderate climate, fertile soil and human settlement.
3. The western and southern plains, representing part of the wide open plains beyond the mountains, known to Kurds as Garmian, meaning "the warm place". This zone borders Diyala and Kirkuk to the south and west. It includes the districts of Kalar, Kifri, Khanaqin (disputed) and parts of Chamchamal and Darbandikhan, forming a broad, low-lying landscape along the Sirwan river basin. This Garmian region is the frontier separating the Zagros Mountains in the northeast from the Mesopotamian plains in the southwest. Characterized by warm temperature, agricultural flat land, low ridges, river valleys, and distant horizons. The main urban center here is Kalar, situated along the Sirwan river.

== See also ==
- Hazar Merd Cave
- Parviz border crossing
- Kermanshah Province
- Lake Kanaw
