= Districts of Iraq =

Third-level administrative divisions of Iraq

Districts of Iraq اقضية العراق (Arabic)
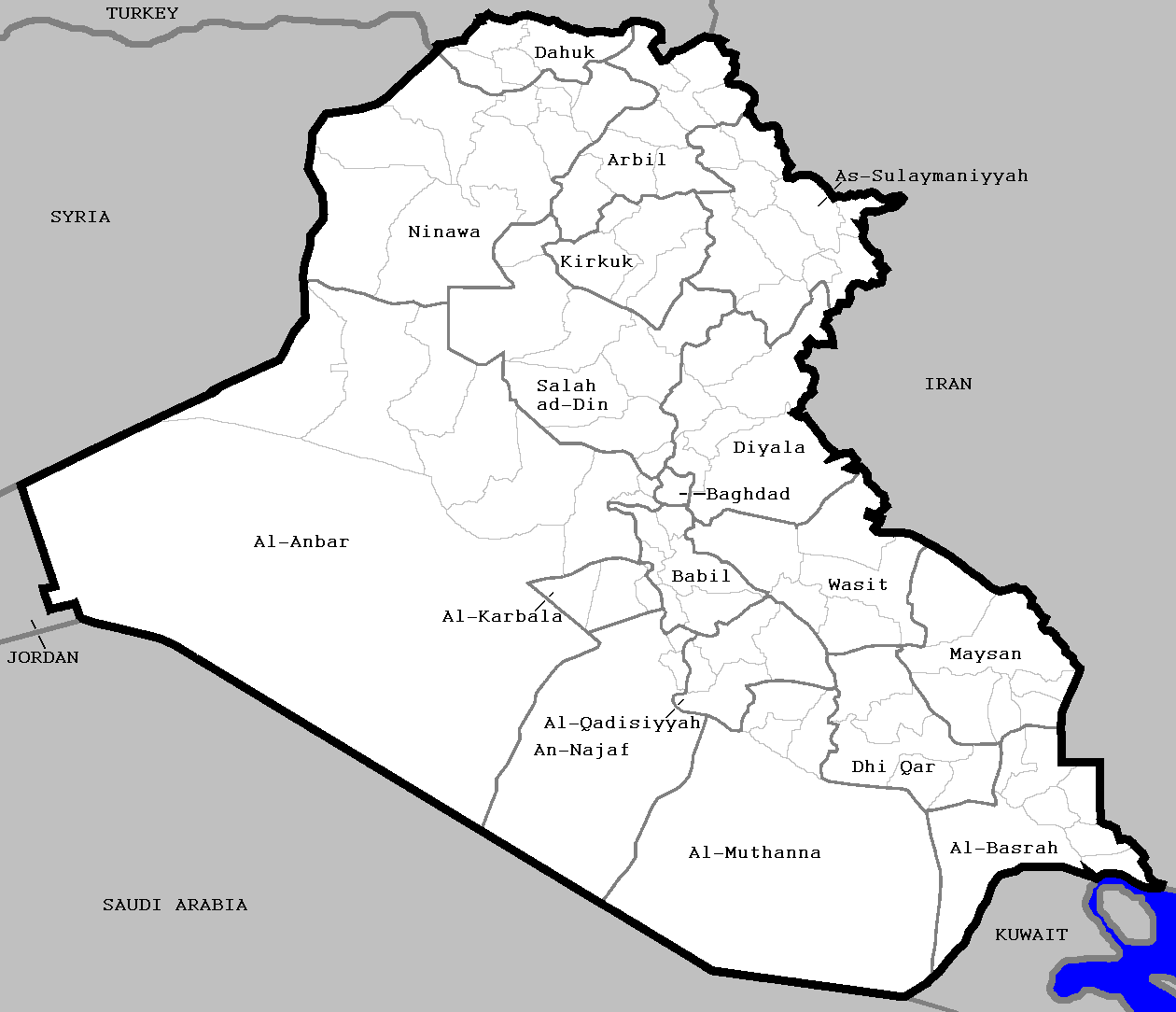
- Category: Federation
- Location: Iraq
- Number: 120
- Government: District government
- Subdivisions: Subdistricts

Iraq's 19 governorates are subdivided into 120 districts (qada). The district usually bears the same name as the district capital.

The districts are listed below (with capital in parentheses):

== Districts by Governorate ==
=== Al Anbar Governorate ===
- Al-Qa'im District (Al-Qa'im)
- Ar-Rutba District (Ar-Rutba)
- Anah District (Anah)
- Fallujah District (Fallujah)
- Haditha District (Haditha)
- Hīt District (Hīt)
- Ramadi District (Ramadi)
- Rawah District (Rawah)

=== Muthanna Governorate ===
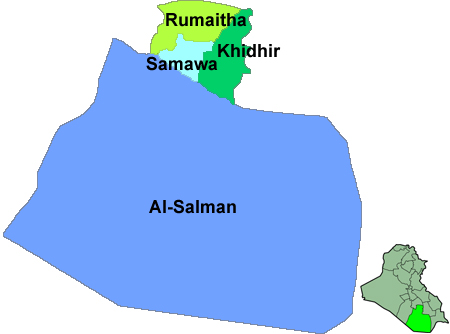

- Al-Khidhir District (Al-Khidhir)
- Al-Rumaitha District (Al-Rumaitha)
- Al-Salman District (Al-Salman)
- Al-Samawa District (Samawa)

=== Qadisiyyah Governorate ===
- Afaq District (Afaq)
- Al-Shamiya District (Al-Shamiya)
- Diwaniya District (Diwaniya)
- Hamza District (Hamza)

=== Babil Governorate ===
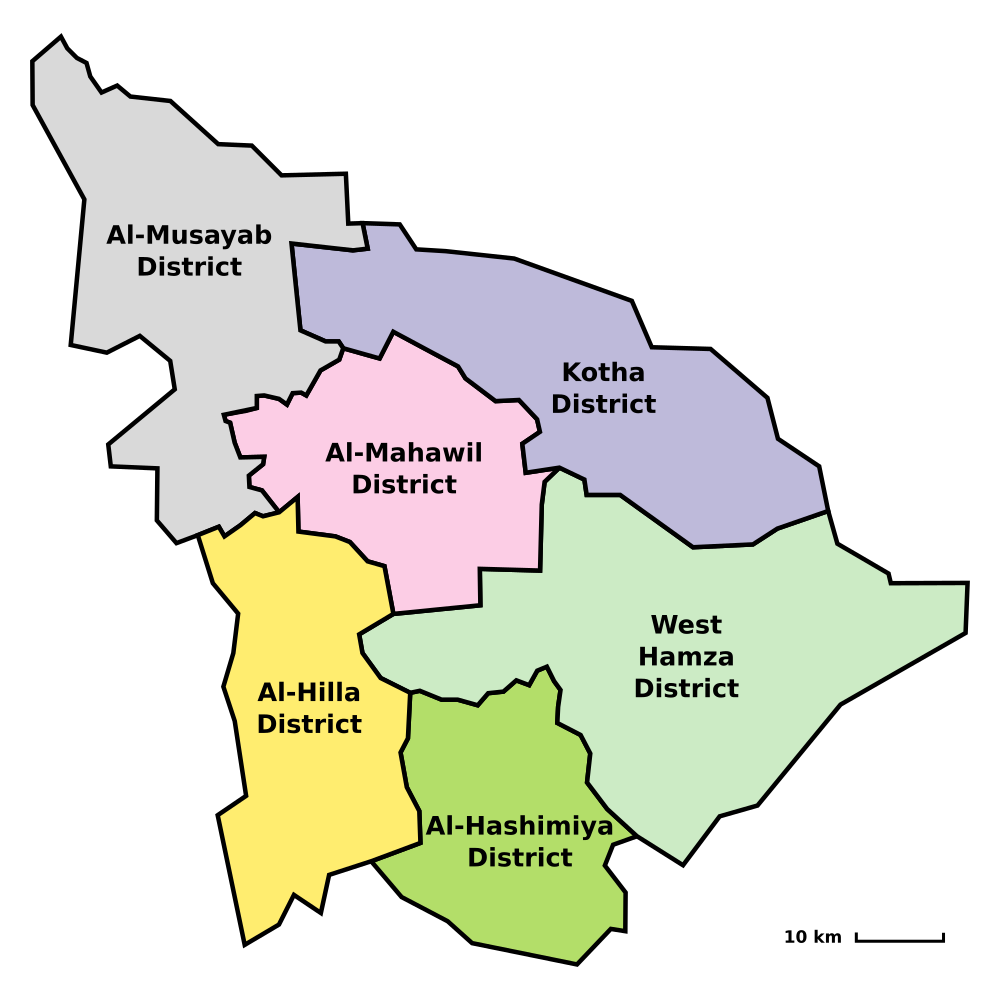

- Al-Mahawil District (Al-Mahawil)
- Al-Musayab District (Al-Musayab)
- Hashimiya District (Hashimiya)
- Hilla District (Hilla)

=== Baghdad Governorate ===
- Abu Ghraib District
- Al-Adhamiyah District
- Al-Karkh District
- Kadhimiya District
- Al-Mada'in District
- Mahmudiya District
- Al-Rasafa District
- Sadr City 1 District
- Sadr City 2 District
- Al Tarmia District

=== Basra Governorate ===
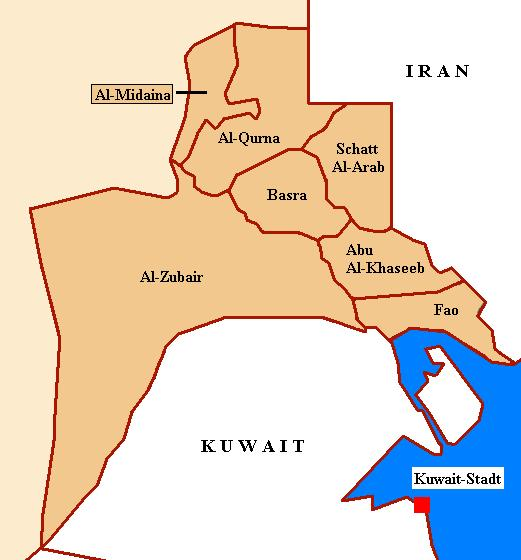

- Abu Al-Khaseeb District (Abu Al-Khaseeb)
- Al-Midaina District (Al-Midaina)
- Al-Qurna District (Al-Qurna)
- Al-Zubair District (Al-Zubair)
- Basrah District (Basrah)
- al-Faw District (al-Faw)

=== Dhi Qar Governorate ===
- Al-Chibayish District (Al-Chibayish)
- Al-Rifa'i District (Al-Rifa'i)
- Al-Shatra District (Al-Shatra)
- Nassriya District (Nassriya)
- Suq Al-Shoyokh District (Suq Al-Shoyokh)

=== Diyala Governorate ===
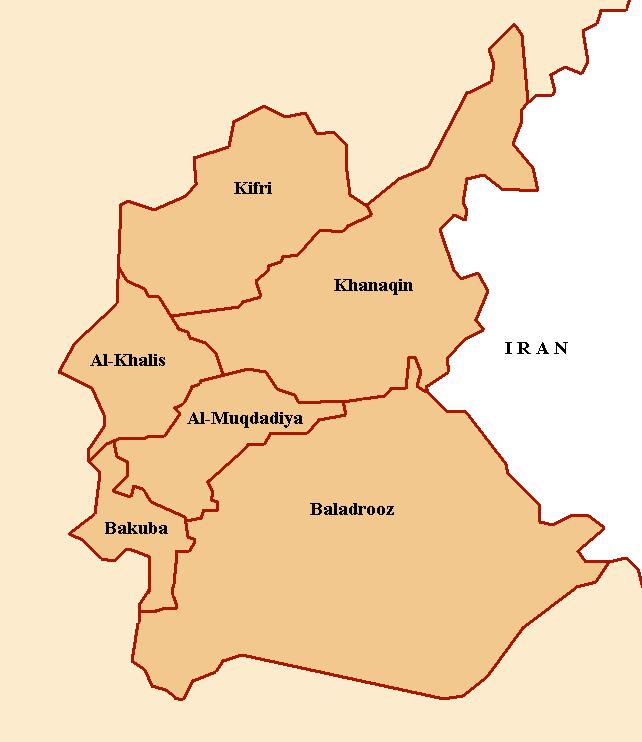

- Al-Khalis District (Al-Khalis)
- Al-Muqdadiya District (Al-Muqdadiya)
- Baladrooz District (Baladrooz)
- Ba'quba District (Ba'quba)
- Khanaqin District (Khanaqin)
- Kifri District (Kifri)

=== Karbala Governorate ===

- Ain Al-Tamur District (Ayn al-Tamr)
- Al-Hindiya District (Al-Hindiya)
- Kerbala District (Kerbala)

=== Kirkuk Governorate ===
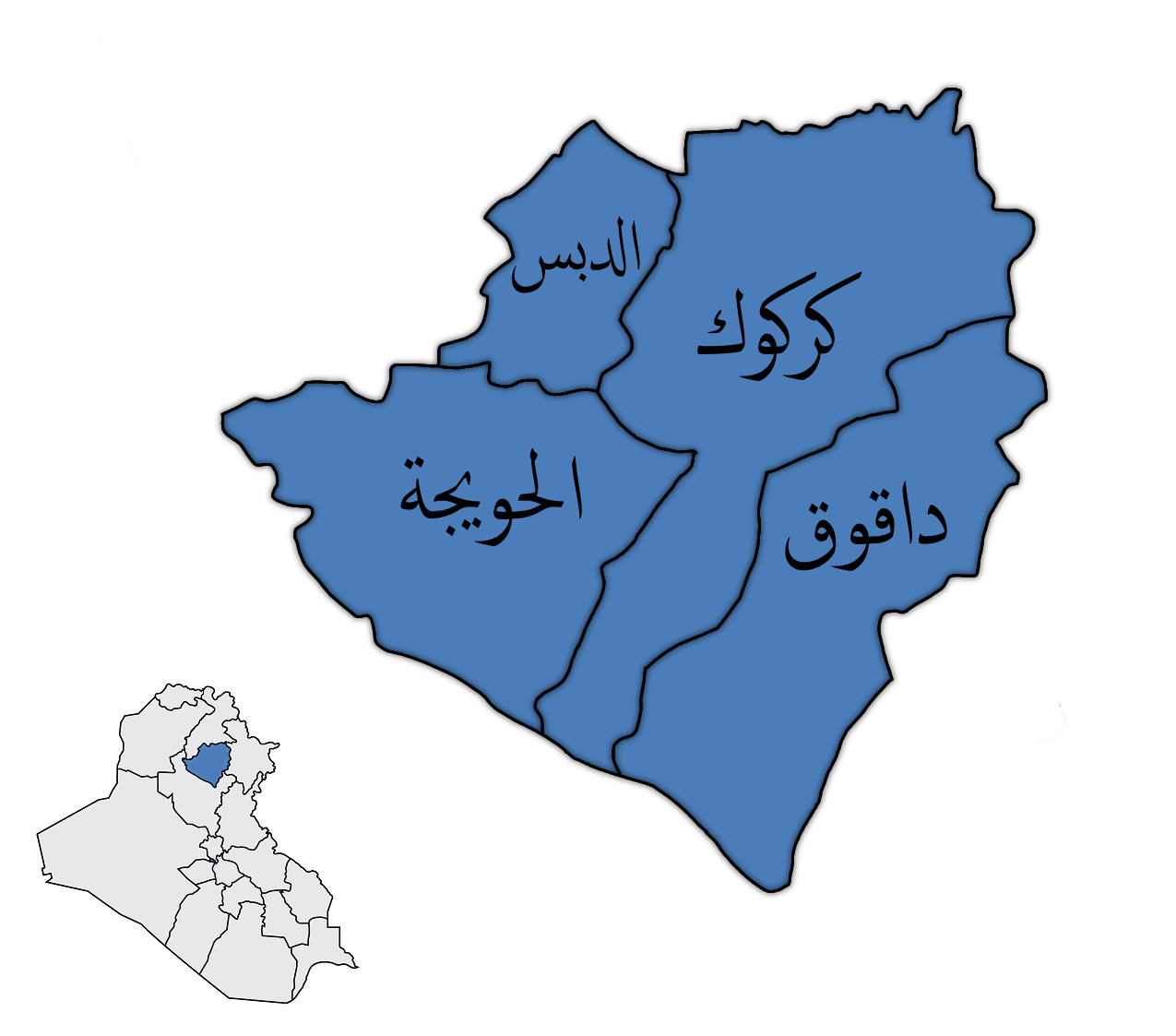
Kirkuk District

(From 1976 to mid-2006 called At-Ta'mim)

- Al-Hawiga District (Al-Hawiga)
- Daquq District (Daquq)
- Kirkuk District (Kirkuk)
- Al-Dibs District (Al-Dibs)

=== Maysan Governorate ===
- Ali Al-Gharbi District (Ali Al-Gharbi)
- Al-Kahla District (Al-Kahla)
- Al-Maimouna District (Al-Maimouna)
- Al-Mejar Al-Kabi District (Majar al-Kabir)
- Amara District (Amarah)
- Qal'at Saleh District (Qal'at Saleh)

=== Najaf Governorate ===
- Al-Manathera District (Al-Manathera)
- Kufa District (Kufa)
- Najaf District (Najaf)
- Al-Meshkhab District (Al-Meshkhab)

=== Nineveh Governorate ===
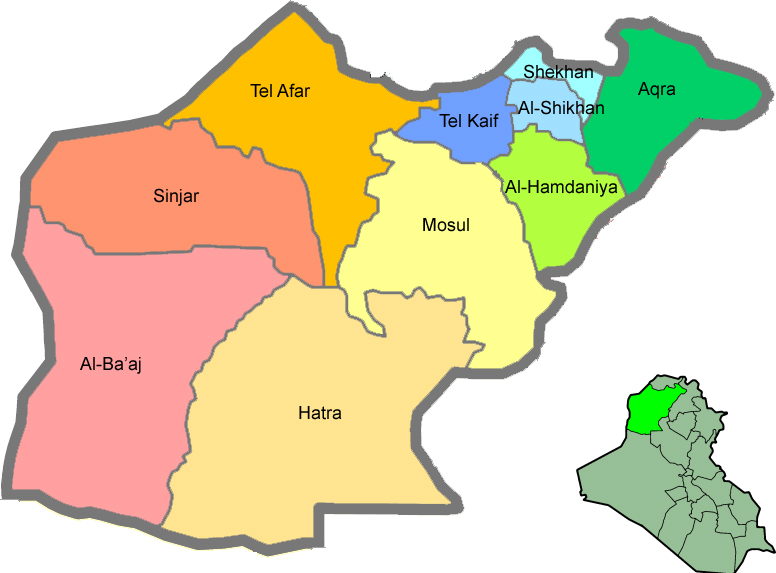

Note that northern Sinjar, northern Tel Afar, northern Tel Keppe, Akre, and northern Shekhan districts are currently under the Kurdistan Region's de facto control.

- Al-Ba'aj District (Al-Ba'aj)
- Al-Hamdaniya District (Bakhdida)
- Makhmur District (Makhmur)
- Hatra District (Hatra)
- Mosul District (Mosul)
- Sinjar District (Sinjar)
- Tel Afar District (Tal Afar)
- Tel Keppe District (Tel Keppe)

=== Saladin Governorate ===
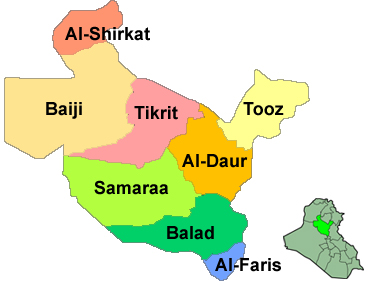

- Al-Daur District (Al-Daur)
- Al-Shirqat District (Al-Shirqat)
- Baiji District (Baiji)
- Balad District (Balad)
- Samarra District (Samarra)
- Tikrit District (Tikrit)
- Tooz District (Tuz Khurmatu)
- Dujail District (Dujail)

=== Wasit Governorate ===
- Al-Aziziyah District (Al-Aziziyah)
- Al-Hai District (Al-Hai)
- Al-Na'maniya District (Al-Na'maniya)
- Al-Suwaira District (Al-Suwaira)
- Badra District (Badra)
- Kut District (Kut)

=== Dohuk Governorate ===
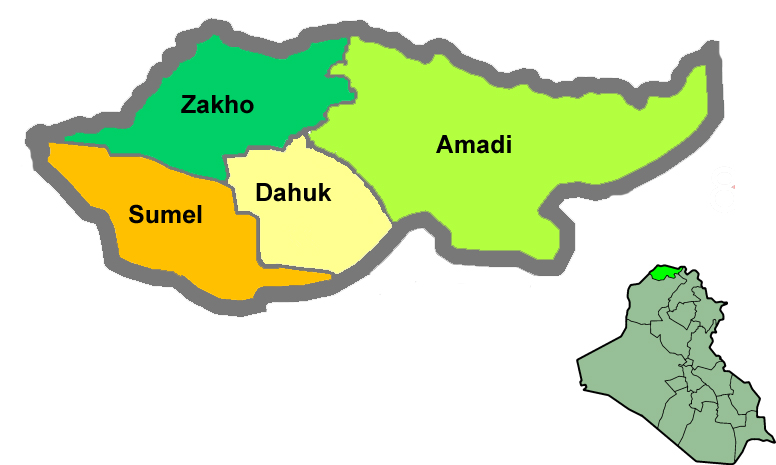

Dohuk Governorate is part of Kurdistan Region.

- Amadiya District (Amadiya)
- Dahuk District (Dahuk)
- Sumel District (Sumel)
- Zakho District (Zakho)
- Bardarash District (Bardarash)
- Akre District (Akre)
- Shekhan District (Ain Sifni)

=== Erbil Governorate ===
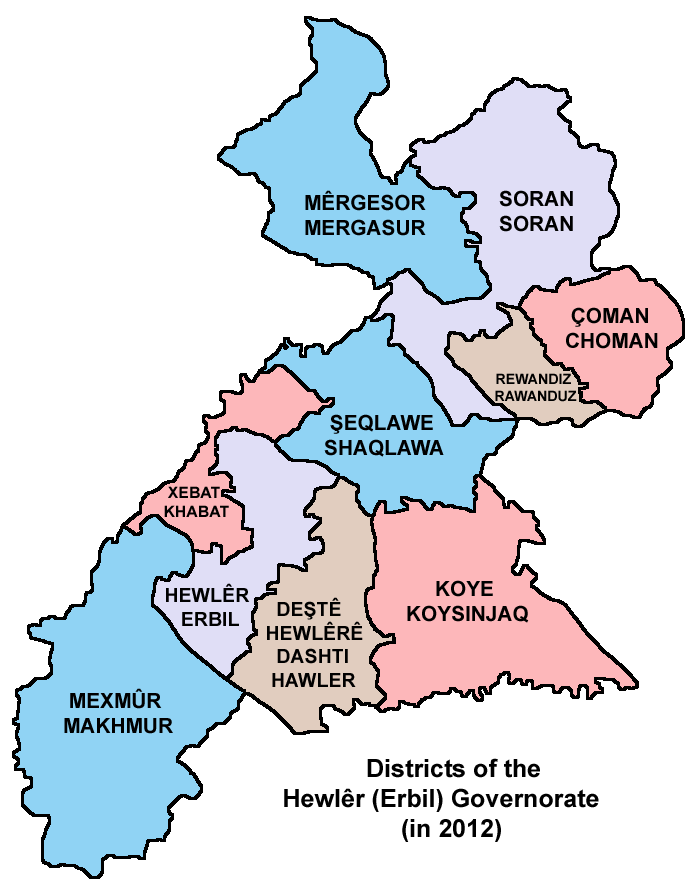

Erbil Governorate is part of Kurdistan Region, while the status of the Makhmur District is contested, which is currently under the control of the federal government.

- Erbil District (71)
- Koisanjaq District (80)
- Shaqlawa District (89), cities are Salahaddin and Hareer
- Soran District (94), cities are Town of Soran, Rawanduz and Diana
- Makhmur District (claimed by Kurdistan Region)
- Mergasur District (83)
- Choman District (66)
- Erbil Countryside District
- Taqtaq District (Taqtaq)

=== Sulaymaniyah Governorate ===
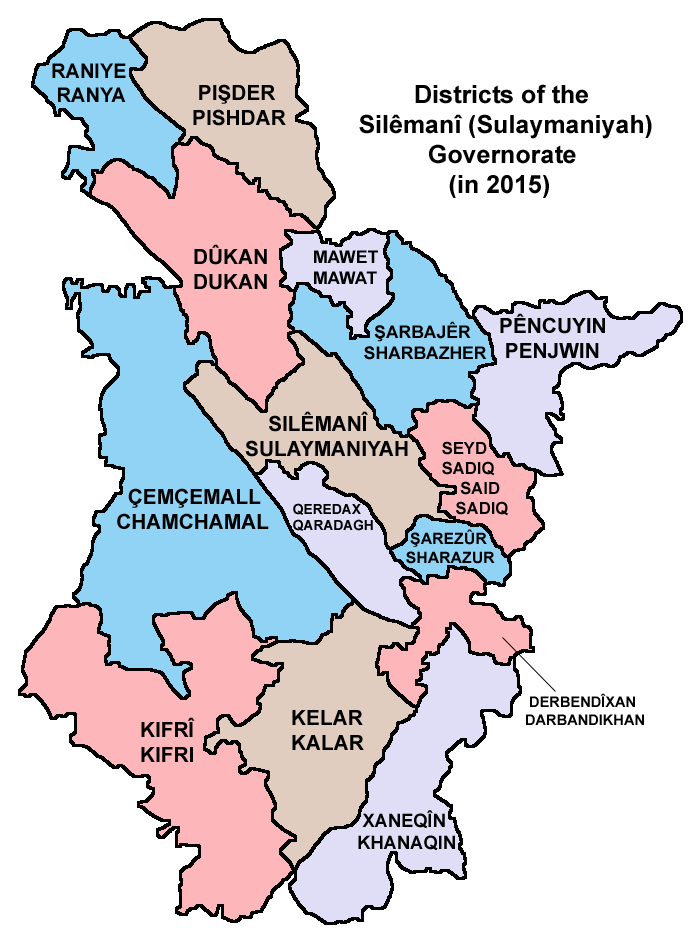

Sulaymaniyah Governorate is part of Kurdistan Region.

- Pshdar District (Qaladiza)
- Chamchamal District (Chamchamal)
- Darbandokeh District (Darbandikhan)
- Dokan District (Dokan)
- Kalar District (Kalar)
- Rania District (Rania)
- Sharbazher District (Sharbazher)
- Sulaymaniya District (Sulaymaniya)
- Saidsadiq District (Saidsadiq)
- Sharazoor District (Halabjay Taza)
- Penjwin District (Penjwin)
- Mawat District (Mawat)
- Qaradagh District (Qaradagh)

=== Halabja Governorate ===
Halabja Governorate is part of Kurdistan Region.

- Halabja
- Sirwan
- Khurmal District (Khurmal)
- Byara District (Byara)
- Bamo

== See also ==
- Governorates of Iraq

== Sources ==
- humanitarianinfo district map
- humanitarianinfo governorate map
