= Al Khadraniyah =

- Town
- Location within Iraq
- Coordinates: 35°36′39″N 43°14′26″E
- Country: Iraq
- Governorate: Saladin
- District: Al-Shirqat

Al Khadraniyah is a village in Iraq. It is located west of River Tigris and north of Al-Shirqat. From 2014 until November 2016, it was under control of ISIL.

== Location ==
Al-Khadraniyah(Al Khaḑrānīyah) is located at 35° 36' 39" North, 43° 14' 26" East, near Sharqat, and the ruins of ancient Assur.

The town is off the Mosul to Tikrit road, on the banks of the Tigris River. The town is services by a railway station and the border between Nineveh Governorate and Al-Shirqat District of Saladin Governorate passes through the town.

== History ==
In 1918 the Battle of Sharqat was fought to the south of the town. In 2014 the town was captured by the Islamic State of Iraq and the Levant, and retaken by the Iraqi Security Forces in November 2016.
