= Shirqat offensive (2016) =

2016 offensive against ISIL's positions in Mosul and the surrounding region

- Part of the War in Iraq (2013–2017) and the US-led intervention in Iraq (2014–2021)
- Map of the territorial control in Mosul, August 2016
Date	24 March – 22 September 2016 (5 months, 4 weeks and 1 day)
Location	Al-Shirqat district, Iraq 35.8003°N 43.2897°E
Result	Iraqi victory: Pro-government forces capture Qayyarah Airfield West, Qayyarah, and Al-Shirqat

Belligerents
Iraq; Kurdistan Region; CJTF–OIR: United States; United Kingdom; France; Canada; Australia	Islamic State of Iraq and the Levant (ISIL/ISIS)

Commanders and leaders
Haider al-Abadi (Prime Minister of Iraq); Major Gen. Najim al-Jubouri (ISF commander of Nineveh Operations); Brig. Ahmed Badr al-Luhaibi † (71st Brigade commander) (Kurdistan Region) Arshad Sanaa † (Peshmerga commander) (Kurdistan Region) Maj. Gen. Mansour Barzani; CJTF–OIR: (United States) Barack Obama; (United States) Sean MacFarland (until 2016); (United States) Stephen J. Townsend (from 2016); (United Kingdom) David Cameron (until 2016); (United Kingdom) Theresa May (from 2016); (France) François Hollande; (Canada) Justin Trudeau; (Australia) Malcolm Turnbull	(Islamic State) Abu Bakr al-Baghdadi (Leader) (Islamic State) Abu Jannat † (ISIL Deputy Military Chief) (Islamic State) Basim Muhammad Ahmad Sultan al-Bajari † (ISIL Deputy War Minister) (Islamic State) Mohammad Ahmad Sha'yeb † (ISIL Governor of the Nineveh Province) (Islamic State) Jassim Salim al-Matyouti † (Replacement Nineveh Province Governor) (Islamic State) Abu Isaac † (Spokesman) (Islamic State) Thaher Mohammed Salman al-Sabawi † (Top commander in the Nineveh Province) (Islamic State) Salam Abd Shabib al-Jbouri † (Top ISIL commander in Mosul) (Islamic State) Hatim Talib al-Hamduni † (Military commander in Mosul) (Islamic State) Imad Khalid Afar † (Senior ISIL adviser) (Islamic State) Wahid as-Sabaawi † (oil minister) (Islamic State) Abu Zaineb † (ISIL commander in Qayyarah) (Islamic State) Ahmed Ghanem al-Hadidi † (Chief of "Cubs of the Caliphate" in Mosul) (Islamic State) Abu Omar al-Assafi (POW) (Wali of Shirqat) (Islamic State) Abu Suleiman †

Units involved
Iraq: Iraqi Security Forces; Armed Forces; Army; 15th Division; 16th Division; Air Force; Nineveh Plain Protection Units; Popular Mobilization Forces (since Aug.) Kurdistan Region: (Kurdistan Region) Peshmerga Ezidkhan: Sinjar Joint Command United States: U.S. Marines; USAF France: French Air Force; French Army United Kingdom: Royal Air Force Canada: Royal Canadian Air Force; Canadian Special Forces	Military of ISIL: Wilayat Ninawa

Strength
ISF: 20,000–25,000 soldiers Peshmerga: 10,000 soldiers NPU: 600 fighters US: 200 Marines (tactical support only); 500 military advisors (since Sept.)	Total: 12,000–20,000: 7,000–15,000 militants in Mosul city; At least 5,000 militants in the Mosul suburbs

Casualties and losses
62 killed 254 wounded 20 killed 150 wounded (United States) 1 killed (France) 2 wounded (ISIL claims 6,630+ overall casualties)	1,300+ militants killed (by June 2016); 99 deserters executed
- 783+ civilians executed 120,000+ civilians displaced

The Shirqat offensive, codenamed Operation Conquest or Operation Fatah, was an offensive against the positions of the Islamic State of Iraq and the Levant (ISIL) in and around the district of Al-Shirqat District to reach the city of Mosul.

The offensive was a joint effort by the Iraqi government forces with allied militias, local Assyrian, Yezidi, Turkmen and Armenian militias, as well as Peshmerga and US and UK air support and limited ground forces. The aim of the operation, part of the military intervention against ISIL, was to set the conditions for an upcoming battle to push ISIL out of the second-largest city of Iraq, as well as the rest of the Nineveh Governorate. The operation followed the Mosul offensive in 2015, which successfully recaptured parts of the region northwest of Mosul, but stopped short of breaching the city itself, for various reasons.

Early in the morning of 21 October 2016, on the fifth day of the Mosul offensive, dozens of ISIL fighters assaulted the oil-rich city of Kirkuk, 175 kilometers (110 mi) from Mosul. After entering the city, ISIL members split up into groups of three to five fighters and spread out to five areas in the city after infiltrating on foot, and the battle lasted into the evening. By 22 October 2016, four of the five areas had been secured, with ISIL fighters remaining alive in the Dumez district. The strategy by Islamic State seems to have only been partially effective, as although it diverted media attention from the Mosul offensive, none of the forces used to repel the ISIL fighters came from the Mosul offensive.

== Background ==
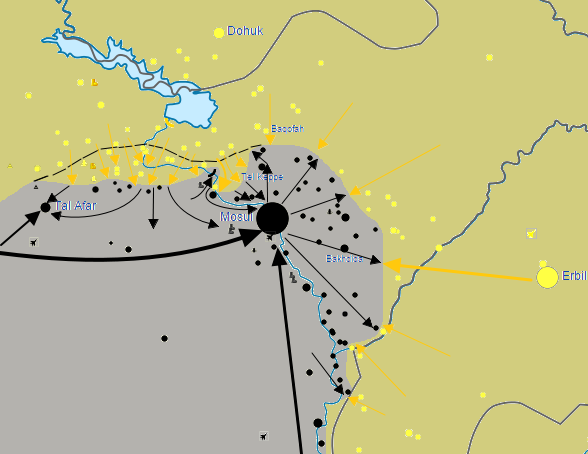
Map of the 2015 offensive's outcome

=== June 2014 ===
In June 2014, Islamic state fighters took control of the city of Mosul, Iraq's second- largest city, and the surrounding towns and villages. Civilians in Mosul and other areas in the province of Ninewa were swept up in the group's reign of terror. In October 2016, Iraq and Kurdish armed forces launched a military operation to retake Mosul. They recaptured territory in areas surrounding Mosul and several neighborhoods in the east of the city. Islamic state fighters have used civilians as human shields and carried out suicide bombings.

After the fall of Mosul to ISIL forces on 10 June 2014, the United States and the Iraqi Government made plans to retake the city. Initially, the plan called for an assault on Mosul in July or August 2015. From late January through early February 2015, the Peshmerga launched an offensive on northwest Mosul with 5,000 soldiers, cutting ISIL supply lines to Tal Afar, and coming within 10 kilometers (6 mi) of the city center, from Mosul's northwestern outskirts. In May 2015, the fall of Ramadi to ISIL delayed the planned offensive to retake Mosul to 2016. In late December, the Iraqi Army fully encircled Ramadi and launched another offensive to retake the city, fully recapturing Ramadi in December 2015 and the neighboring districts in February 2016. In late February 2016, 4,000 Iraqi soldiers redeployed to the Makhmour area in the southwestern Erbil Governorate, in preparation for an offensive on Mosul.

== Offensive ==
=== March ===
The offensive began on 24 March 2016, near the Makhmur area of Nineveh Governorate. Thousands of Iraqi troops had been deployed there in the previous weeks, setting up bases alongside Kurdish and US forces. While advancing westward toward the oil town of Qayyarah, Iraqi troops were reported to have recaptured several villages from ISIL, among them Al-Nasr, Garmandi, Kudila and Khurburdan, though it was later revealed that ISIL was still occupying Al-Nasr and the government forces were trying to capture it.

Around 4,000 soldiers, from two brigades of the U.S.-trained 15th Division of the Iraqi army, including Sunni tribal fighters (considered by Peshmerga commanders to be crucial to hold the traditionally Sunni areas), met stiff resistance. It was reported that they were attacked by suicide bombers as well as with mortars and machine guns, which stopped the advance for the time being. Warplanes of the U.S.-led coalition against ISIL launched multiple airstrikes on at least two locations. 200 U.S. Marines had set up a small outpost called Firebase Bell in the previous weeks. From there they provided artillery and targeting support for Iraqi forces. The presence of U.S. Marines became known after one of them was recently killed by the detonation of a roadside bomb. Kurdish Peshmerga forces didn't take an active part, contenting themselves with holding the front line at what they consider the border of their territory. It was announced on 27 March that Abu Furqan al-Misry, an ISIL commander and executioner who was a notorious figure in the region, had been killed.

There were reports of 25 ISIL fighters killed as the Iraqi army shelled ISIL headquarters in Qayyarah.

=== April ===
By the first days of April 2016, thousands of Mosul residents began to flee the area, as Iraqi government forces inched closer toward the city. ISIL reportedly started using the chemistry lab of the Mosul University for making bombs.

The Joint Task Force carried out airstrikes against ISIL near Qayyarah on 1 April. The airstrikes destroyed a weapon storage facility, a tactical vehicle and two mortar firing positions. IraqiNews.com reported on 2 April that 40 ISIL militants had been killed by government forces in different regions south of Mosul, including six suicide bombers and one senior leader.

The ISIL-occupied Turkish Consulate was destroyed by airstrikes from the U.S.-led coalition after Turkey had given its approval for targeting the consulate. Later on the same day, the Iraqi Army killed 30 militants and detonated a booby-trapped vehicle in the village of al-Nasr, in Makhmur District south of Mosul.

On 5 April, Coalition aircraft bombed a training headquarters belonging to ISIL near the Grand Mosque in Mosul, killing 50 Islamic State fighters, as well as destroying their headquarters completely.

On 6 April, Iraqi security forces from the army's 15th brigade, Peshmerga, and tribal fighters resumed military operations, after receiving information about the presence of a large number of booby-trapped vehicles and suicide bombers belonging to ISIL in al-Nasr village south of Mosul, killing 70 ISIL militants and destroying seven car bombs.

The Iraqi government released footage on 7 April that showed an airstrike conducted by the coalition forces in Mosul which destroyed a bridge that was being used to ferry supplies by ISIL. In addition, the government claimed that a number of militants had been killed in the airstrikes, as well as other roads and bridges used as supply lines by ISIL being cut off. On the same day, US-led coalition aircraft carried out an air strike targeting a laboratory of chlorine-filled rockets, chlorine gas and other toxic materials belonging to ISIL in al-Saawiya village in Qayyara District, killing 30 fighters who were inside the laboratory and destroying it completely.

On 9 April, at least 30 ISIL militants were killed by Coalition airstrikes in Mosul. Two airstrikes struck an ISIL defensive fence in Al-Haj, south of Mosul, killing over 20 militants and pulverizing the base. 10 ISIL militants were also killed when Coalition jets pounded another site in the Al-Mahanna district, to the south of Mosul. British aircraft carried out airstrikes near Mosul and Qayyarah on 12 April, taking out an ISIL rocket-launching team near Mosul and a mortar team near Qayyarah. On 16 April, a Coalition airstrike killed Imad Khalid Afar, a senior ISIL commander and adviser, near the Salam Hospital.

On 18 April, US and Peshmerga forces carried out a raid in Hamam Alil, to the south of Mosul, killing three ISIL militants. One of them was Salam Abd Shabib al-Jbouri, the top ISIL commander in Mosul. On the same day, the Peshmerga launched an offensive on Khorsabad, to the northeast of Mosul, capturing the villages of Nawara and Barima, as well as the Khorsabad Intersection, to the north of Khorsabad. By 19 April, Peshmerga forces entered Khorsabad.

On 27 April, the Iraqi Army captured Mahana, a village in the Makhmour area located southeast of Qayyarah. The clashes and the aerial bombardments at Mahana resulted in the deaths of 200 ISIL militants. On the same day, the Iraqi Army shelled Khayata village, in the Qayyara district, killing 35 ISIL militants. On 29 April, the Iraqi Army repelled an ISIL counterattack on the villages of Mahana and Khardan, killing 91 ISIL militants. An Australian ISIL recruiter, Neil Prakash, also known by his alias Abu Khaled al-Cambodi, was killed in a US airstrike in Mosul on the same day.

=== May 2016 ===
On 2 May, nine ISIL militants were killed by a shelling conducted by the Iraqi Army 15th Brigade on an ISIL gathering in Shayla village in Makhmur District, south of Mosul.

On 3 May, at 7:30 am, 125 ISIL militants with more than 20 vehicles attacked a Peshmerga position, near the town of Tel Skuf, 28–30 km north of Mosul, where a dozen U.S. troops acting as advisors were visiting. American and Peshmerga forces fought back but the militants broke into the position using three truck bombs followed by bulldozers which cleared the wreckage away. The Peshmerga and U.S. forces called for a Quick Reaction Force (QRF) which responded and joined the battle, helping the advisors and other personnel to withdraw. 11 to 13 U.S. aircraft; F-15s F-16s, A-10s, B-52s and two drones carried out 31 airstrikes, which destroyed two more truck bombs, and together the coalition forces repelled the attack. The battle continued for another 12 hours, in total; 58 militants were killed, three mortars and 20 of their vehicles were destroyed, Peshmerga forces captured at least three US-made Humvees that ISIL had itself captured from the Iraqi military in 2014. Special Warfare Operator 1st Class Charles Keating IV; a U.S. Navy SEAL who was part of the QRF, was struck by direct ISIL small arms fire at 9:32 am, he was medevaced to a medical facility in Erbil where he later died of his wound, making him the third American serviceman to be killed in combat during Operation Inherent Resolve in Iraq. 10 Peshmerga fighters were also killed and a further 30 wounded, two U.S. medevac helicopters were also damaged by small arms fire. The Islamic State attack was part of their counter-offensive on multiple fronts overnight to obtain new ground. Near Tel Skuf, ISIL covertly assembled their forces and attacked before 6 am into Kurdish territory, destroying a Peshmerga checkpoint on the way to Tel Skuf. Iraqi military sources said that special forces had foiled an attack by five suicide bombers in the village of Khirbirdan, and Peshmerga forces repelled an Islamic State assault on Wardak. Coalition aircraft carried out seven airstrikes near Mosul, hitting six groups of ISIL fighters as well as two vehicles, three weapons caches, a mortar system and other targets. U.S. Army Colonel Steve Warren labeled the offensive as one of the most complex battlefield operations launched by ISIL since December 2015.

On 6 May, coalition aviation conducted an aerial strike on a gathering of ISIL forces in the village of al-Ju'wana in the district of Makhmour, resulting in the death of 20. On 7 May, coalition aviation carried out an air strike, destroying an ISIL fuel station south of Mosul, killing 17.

On 9 May, Iraqi forces retook the northern village of Kabrouk from ISIL, supported by artillery and airstrikes from the U.S.-led Coalition, killing 40 militants during the liberation that took less than two hours while militants put up little resistance in the village. This advance brought Iraqi forces slightly closer to the oil town of Qayyara on the western banks of the Tigris River.

On 29 May, Peshmerga forces, consisting of 5,500 fighters, supported by the Coalition airstrikes, retook al-Muftiyah and Jim Kour towns near Mosul. From 28 to 30 May, Peshmerga forces recaptured nine villages to the southeast of Mosul, including Mufti, Tulaband, Shuqali and Wardak. Four Peshmerga fighters and 140 ISIL militants were killed in the clashes.

On 31 May, the Iraqi army repelled an ISIL attack on the areas of Kabrouk, Mahana and Kharbrdan west of Makhmur, killing 22 ISIL fighters. During the attack the militants used two booby-trapped vehicles against the army's district headquarters.

=== June 2016 ===
Mosul area

On 12 June, the Iraqi Army started a renewed offensive south of Mosul to capture the village of Hajj Ali, on the banks of the River Tigris. The offensive was supported by coalition warplanes, after U.S. and Iraqi units had hit ISIL positions with artillery in the recent days. On 13 June the Iraqi Army captured Hajj Ali along with the villages of Khirab Jabri and Kaproki.

Two senior Islamic State group commanders were killed in a US airstrike in the northern Iraqi city of Mosul on 25 June, according to the Pentagon. The strike killed ISIL's deputy war minister, Basim Muhammad Ahmad Sultan al-Bajari, and a military commander named Hatim Talib al-Hamduni, the Pentagon said in a statement. Al-Bajari was suspected of organizing mustard gas attacks and leading the group's takeover of Mosul in 2014.

=== July 2016 ===
On 7 July, the Iraqi Army captured an area on the Tigris River to the southwest of Haj Ali, linking up two fronts, and besieging an ISIL pocket containing 100+ villages and the town of Hawija.

On 9 July, the Iraqi Army recaptured Qayyarah Airfield West in Nineveh province from ISIL, reportedly "without any resistance". The airfield was considered a "strategic launch-pad" for the ongoing Mosul offensive.

Meanwhile, on 15 July, Iraqi troops established a floating bridge over the Tigris river south of Mosul, connecting Makhmur to Qayyarah. On 16 July, a large boat carrying more than two tons of explosives en route to the floating bridge was destroyed completely by a coalition airstrike near Haj Ali village.

Nineveh provincial council member Hossam al-Abbar said on 26 July that over 1,500 ISIL members, including several of its senior leaders, had escaped from Mosul and were headed towards Raqqa in Syria. Al-Abbar said in a press statement that there were around 9000 ISIL members in Mosul, including Arab, foreign and local nationals before the recapture of Qayyarah base and surrounding villages by pro-government forces, but the number had declined after their recapture as many had been killed or escaped the city.

A local source in Nineveh province announced on 28 July that a group of youngsters attacked an ISIL prison, killed a prison guard and helped dozens of detainees escape. Most of the detainees were from Mosul and they were arrested on charges of collaborating with the security forces. ISIL had demanded ransoms from the families of the detainees, ranging from 100,000 to 200,000 Iraqi dinars. It was also reported that ISIL's military Wali of Tigris, Abu Shuaib, was killed in an airstrike by the coalition along with many other leaders of the group.

=== August 2016 ===
On 2 August, the Media War Cell reported that pro-government forces had recaptured the public road and al-Hathr junction as well as the surrounding villages from Qayyarah base to Tlul al-Bj. On 5 August, media officials in the Ministry of Defense announced that an ISIL Sharia Court and an explosives factory had been destroyed in Mosul in airstrikes carried out by Iraqi Air Force. On 13 August, Nineveh Operations Command announced the recapture of al-Jadaa, Zahilila, Ajba and Jwan villages south of Mosul by Anti-Terrorism Directorate and the 9th Brigade of Iraqi Army. A power station in Qayyarah was blown up by militants who escaped after blasting it. Soldiers were deployed in the area after the incident.

On 14 August, Iraqi forces in collaboration with Kurdish forces captured four villages which were Tal Hamid, Qarqasha, Abzakh and Qura Takh located near Mosul. Later the Nineveh Provincial Council also announced capture of three other villages which were Suteih, Qashqala and Qaryytakh.

By 15 August, the number of villages captured by Peshmerga rose to 12 during the operation and reached the western Kanhash side al-Kwir (Gwer) bridge, capturing the area. The newly captured villages were Sanf, Homaira, Hasudiya, small Kahnash and big Kahnash. The Peshmerga command announced the end of the offensive after the villages were captured. About 165 ISIL militants died during the offensive. On 16 August, Kurdistan Democratic Party official confirmed that ISIL's 'Minister of Media' Abu Aed al-Shami was killed during the offensive.

On the same day media officials of Ministry of Defence announced that Anti-Terrorism Forces captured four villages by the names of al-Hawish, al-Jawa'na, al-Jubla and al-Ghazeya.

On 17 August, the Iraqi Air Force carried out an airstrike on a headquarters of the group in Mosul. A security official of the group along with a number of fighters died as a result of the airstrike. The US-led coalition also carried out airstrikes over several headquarters of the group on the same day in which at least 50 militants were killed and over 22 vehicles belonging to the group were destroyed. On 18 August, an airstrike by the US-led coalition killed seven ISIL militants and destroyed two of their vehicles in Kokji village north of Mosul. Airstrikes were also carried out in south of Mosul with 18 militants being killed in airstrike on ISIL vehicles on the highway between Qayyarah and Hamam al-Alil and 30 ISIL tankers being destroyed in airstrike near Qayyarah.

On 21 August, the US-led coalition killed four ISIL militants and destroyed 12 vehicles belonging to the group which they were planning to set ablaze in order to obscure vision of pro-government troops. Iraqi air force carried out an airstrike in Mosul. A missile manufacturing factory was destroyed in the airstrike while 10 militants including Algerian leader of the group Abu Ritaj was killed. A bomb targeting a convoy of the group exploded near Tel Kaif, killing six militants. An ISIL counterattack on al-Kweir was repelled by the Peshmarga, resulting in deaths of 13 militants. On 22 August, the anti-ISIL coalition bombed an assembly of ISIL fighters in Al-Safina village near Gwer, resulting in 12 militants being killed and 13 being injured. ISIL attacked the Iraqi army and civilians in Al-Owisja village with rockets containing chlorine gas, however no officer or civilian was injured. A counterattack by ISIL on al-Jad'aa, al-Remah and Ajhala was repelled with a number of militants being killed and three booby-trapped vehicles being destroyed by the Iraqi army.

On 23 August, Iraqi forces backed by the international coalition launched an offensive to capture Qayyarah. The forces entered the city from three points and were coordinating with armed residents inside the city. The center of the city had reportedly been stormed by the troops within hours of the launch of the offensive. 23 car bombs of ISIL were destroyed in the clashes and dozens of fighters including a Chechen leader of the group Abu Futuhi were killed. Amin Shekhani, an Iraqi commander while commenting on the progress later reported the troops were still advancing towards the center. 10 Iraqi soldiers who were trying to clear the city center were killed in a suicide bombing. During the clashes, Iraqi troops captured the roadway between Qayyarah and Hamam Ali. The next day, Iraqi forces relaunched an offensive against the fighters north of Qayyarah. Army officer Shaeb Lafta said that Iraqi troops had captured several areas, oil refineries and buildings including the main government complex as well as killed an ISIL commander Abul-Futuh al-Shishani. Over 40 militants were killed on the first day of the operation. The Anti-Terrorism Directorate announced that Iraqi forces had captured the general hospital of the city. Meanwhile, an airstrike on an ISIL headquarters killed and injured several militants, however it also killed 10 civilians and wounded 15 of them. A vehicle-borne improvised-explosive-device factory near Mosul was also destroyed in an airstrike by the coalition on the same day.

General Moen al-Saadi later stated that Iraqi forces had captured al-Masaf, al-Masfa, the government complex, government building of Qayyarah vicinity and the northern road in Western Qayyarah. A Nineveh Council member later claimed that Qayyarah had been fully liberated. However, General Moen al-Saadi stated on 25 August that Iraqi forces were still in the last phase of capturing the city and had captured the city center. He also stated that more than 30 militants had been killed that morning. Meanwhile, the Iraqi Air Force destroyed an ISIL convoy consisting of eight trucks fleeing from Sharqat to Hawija. Later in the day, Qayyarah was fully captured by Iraqi forces with Lieutenant General Riyadh Jalal Tawfiq stating that they now controlled all parts of the city and Prime Minister Haider hailing the capture of the city as a "key step in the fight" against ISIL. On 26 August, 12 militants were killed in an airstrike by the U.S.-led coalition on a weapons depot of the group in Saadia village. In addition, 10 militants were killed in explosion of an ISIL car bomb between Makhmour and Qayyarah.

After Qayyarah was captured by the Iraqi armed forces, ISIL set 11 oil wells around the town on fire. On 29 August, Abu Yahya Alwaizi, an ISIL leader, was killed in airstrike in Mosul by Inherent Resolve.

=== September 2016 ===
On 2 September, the Assyrian Nineveh Plain Protection Units stated they had captured the village of Badanah from ISIL and also uploaded images and videos of the militias entering the village, however United States did not confirm or deny whether it had been captured. The Popular Mobilization Forces also declared that the village had been captured by the Assyrian militia. On 4 September, the anti-ISIL coalition carried out an airstrike on a car-bomb manufacturing factory in Tal Afar, destroying it completely while also killing seven militants. Meanwhile, unidentified gunmen attacked a security headquarters of the group in Ba'aj district. Five ISIL militants including the district's security of chief for the group, Mahmoud Sulaiman al-Muslih, also known as Abu Ayoub were killed in the attack. On 5 September, an investment bank in Mosul being used as a security headquarters by the group was destroyed in an airstrike carried out by the US-led coalition. On 7 September, an airstrike by the coalition on a headquarters of the group in Ghabat area of Mosul killed 15 militants. The airstrike resulted in the complete destruction of the headquarters along with the destruction of 12 booby-trapped vehicles belonging to the group.

On 10 September, more than 180 ISIL fighters were reported to have fled from Mosul to Raqqa. On 11 September, 18 ISIL fighters were killed and seven were injured in an airstrike carried out by the anti-ISIL coalition in Shura area and Kahara village of the Nineveh Governorate. Meanwhile, the group's Chief of Media Operations, Abu Muhammad Furqan was killed alongside 20 other media workers and officials of the group in an attack conducted by the Iraqi Army in al-Ba'aj District. On 12 September, ISIL launched counterattacks at Qayyarah which was repelled by pro-government forces. Sixteen militants were killed while eight were arrested while three suicide attacks by the group were thwarted. The group also launched a failed offensive against the axis of Nineveh police's 8th regiment near the wilderness area on the road between Baghdad and Mosul. The Iraqi security forces repelled the attack and killed over 100 militants while injuring dozens of other militants. Over five booby-trapped vehicles belonging to the group were destroyed in the offensive. Meanwhile, an airstrike carried out by the Inherent Resolve coalition which destroyed a chemical weapons factory of the group near Mosul. On 13 September, an attack by ISIL in the axis of Al-Houd, Al-Hadher and Al-Shebali, south of Mosul, was repelled by pro-government forces. Over 70 militants were killed in the failed attack while no casualties were reported on the side of pro-government forces. On 14 September, the group's spokesman in Mosul was killed alongside two of his escorts were killed in Mosul when unidentified gunmen ambushed him and attacked his car.

On 16 September, the US-led coalition carried out airstrikes against an ISIL tactical position near Qayyarah that destroyed a vehicle, a weapons cache and 29 watercraft belonging to the group. The coalition also carried out airstrikes near Mosul and Qayyarah, destroying eight fighting positions of the group along with a tunnel. Meanwhile, hundreds of American troops arrived at Qayyarah Airfield West to support Iraqi Armed Forces in capturing Mosul. On 17 September, a senior leader Tamas al-Shishani was killed along with several other militants in an airstrike carried out by the anti-ISIL coalition near al-Shur which is located south of Mosul. On 18 September, ISIL launched two separate offensives at Bashiqa and Gwer. Both of the offensives however were repelled by the Peshmerga. The militants also attacked a Peshmerga headquarters in Khazir district which is located east of Mosul. The group launched three simultaneous car bombs on security checkpoints, followed by shelling of the headquarters. At least four Peshmerga fighters were killed in the attack while seven were wounded.

On 19 September, Iraqi Prime Minister Haider al-Abadi announced the start of the offensive to recapture Al-Shirqat. On 20 September, Iraqi forces recaptured seven villages around Shirqat. Majority of ISIL leaders were reported to have fled from Shirqat to Hawija during the beginning of the offensive. An ISIL military official along with two other militants were reported to have been killed in an artillery strike on the same day, while about 22 militants were killed in clashes for Ajmasi and Al-Shabali villages in addition to the destruction of five car bombs and two drones belonging to ISIL. Meanwhile, ISIL fired a shell at the American personnel in Qayyarah Airfield West. The shell was suspected of containing a mustard agent, however no personnel was exposed to it. It was confirmed on 22 September that the shell did contain a mustard agent.

The mayor of Shirqat stated on 21 September that pro-government forces had captured 12 villages while also stating that five security personnel and a civilian had been killed during the battle for the town. Twelve security personnel and three civilians were also reported to have been injured. On the same day, the anti-ISIL coalition and Iraqi Air Force carried out airstrikes southwest of Sharqat destroyed nine booby-trapped vehicles. Meanwhile, residents of the city stormed a prison of ISIL and freed 40 prisoners after killing five militants guarding the prison.

Reports of Shirqat being fully captured by pro-government forces started emerging on 21 September. However clashes were still ongoing in the city on 22 September, with the Iraqi Army stating it had captured the center of the town, the mayor's office, the municipal building and the hospital. At least 33 militants were reported to have been killed during the day during a military operation in the town. Meanwhile, unidentified gunmen set ISIL's publishing house in Mosul on fire after killing its guards. The anti-ISIL coalition carried out an airstrike on gathering of ISIL fighters in al-Safina village near Shirqat, resulting in the deaths of over 160 militants. Later in the day, Shirqat was fully captured by pro-government forces with Yahya Rasool, the spokesman for the military's joint operations command, declaring on state television that the town had been "liberated from the desecration of terrorism". An attack by ISIL on villages north of the town was repelled, with 40 militants being killed while no casualties were reported among Iraqi security personnel.

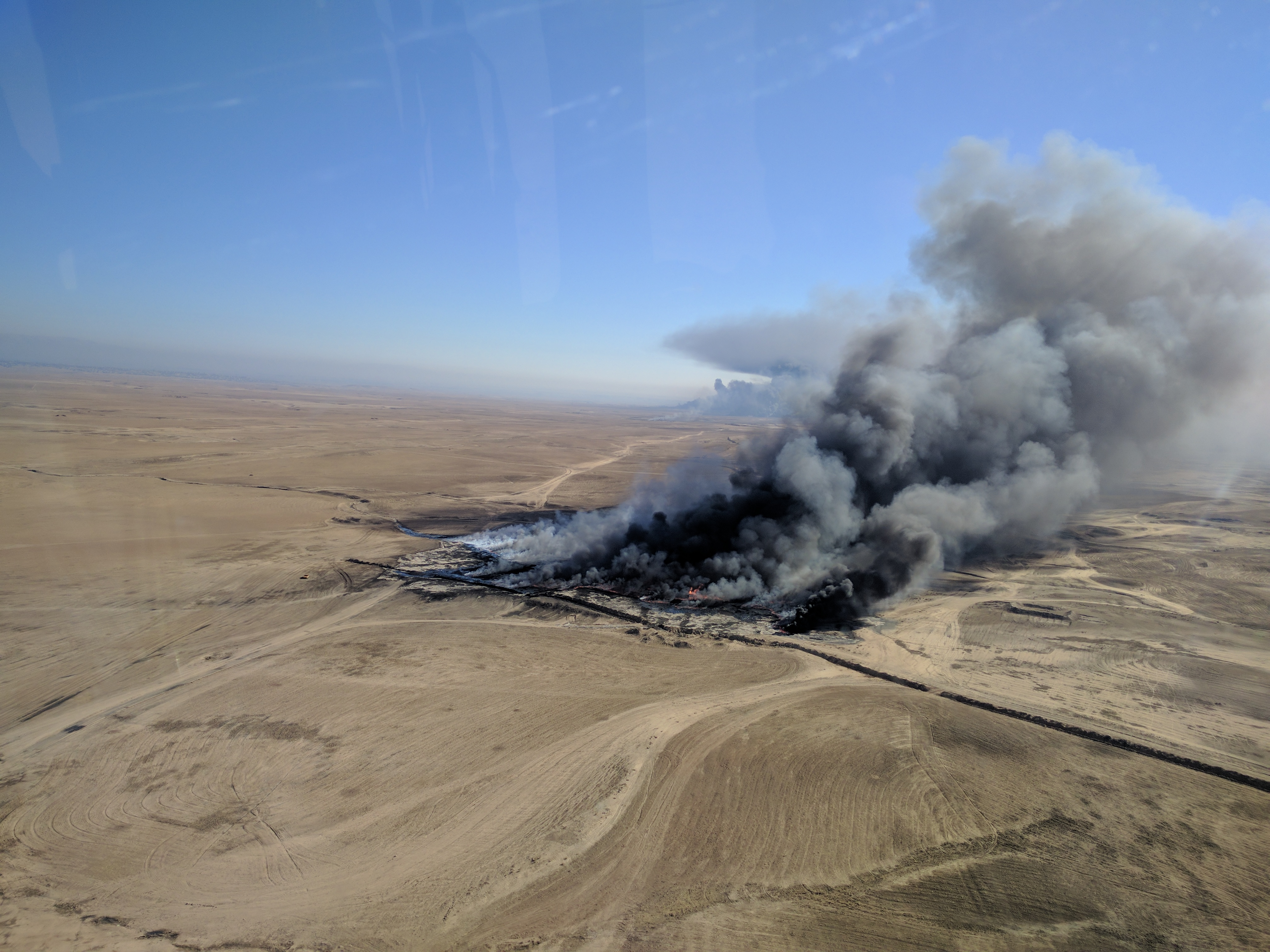
Oil fires burn near Qayyarah, Iraq months after ISIL left behind a trail of destruction during their withdrawal toward Mosul.

On 23 September, the US military reported that ISIL had started digging trenches around Mosul and were pouring oil in them in order to defend against the upcoming assault by Iraqi Army on the city. It also stated that the group had started to move large walls to slow down the attack. On 24 September, the Peshmerga reported that the US-led coalition carried out an airstrike on an ISIL tunnel near Bashiqa. The attack resulted in the deaths of 12 militants and three chemical specialists. Another airstrike carried out on the group's ISIL Sharia Court located in a residential neighborhood of Mosul, resulted in the deaths of 11 civilians. ISIL's Wali (governor) of Shirqat, Abu Omar al-Assafi was arrested on 25 September while trying to flee among the displaced civilians by disguising as a woman. Meanwhile, Operation Inherent Resolve carried out airstrikes against the group's truck near al-Mishraq Sulphur factory south of Mosul. The strike resulted in the deaths of the occupants. Another airstrike carried out on al-Houda village south of Mosul also destroyed two car bombs belonging to the group. Nine boats belonging to the group were also destroyed southwest of Nineveh Governorate, resulting in the deaths of all occupants. In addition, Iraqi Armed Forces repulsed an attack conducted by ISIL near Mosul, with 32 vehicles belonging to the group being destroyed.

On 27 September, the anti-ISIL coalition carried out airstrikes against ISIL in al-Houd village which is located south of Mosul. The airstrikes resulted in the destruction of three car bombs as well as deaths of the occupants. Another airstrike on a gathering of the militants near Qayyarah resulted in the deaths of dozens of militants. On 28 September, the Ministry of Oil stated that ISIL had lost control of their last oil wells in Iraq following the Shirqat offensive.

=== October 2016 ===
Turkish troops as well as fighters of Popular Mobilisation Units station in Camp Zilkan which is located north of Mosul, were shelled by ISIL on 1 October. On 2 October, a military chief of ISIL Mohamed Ali Mohamed also known as Henadi Abu Shawarib, was reported to have been killed along with three other militants in an airstrike carried out by the anti-ISIL coalition. In addition, the group's Al-Bayan radio station in Mosul was destroyed in airstrikes carried out by Iraqi Air Force. Also on the same day, a booby-trapped drone launched by ISIL militants killed two Kurdish Peshmerga fighters and wounded two French soldiers in Erbil.

On 5 October, at least 20 pro-government tribal fighters were allegedly killed in an airstrike near Qayyarah because they were mistaken from ISIL fighters after repelling an ISIL offensive. The Agricultural Minister of Iraq, Falah Hassan Zaidan confirmed the strike had taken place. The Tribal Mobilisation Forces alleged that the airstrikes were carried out by the US-led anti-ISIL coalition. Meanwhile, an airstrike carried out by the coalition on the headquarters of ISIL in Kharaeb Jabr village in Qayyarah resulted in the death of ten militants.

On 8 October, an attack by ISIL on Tlul al-Baj village located south of Mosul, was repelled by the Iraqi Army. Six militants were killed in the failed attack while two car bombs were destroyed. Meanwhile, the group launched a counter-attack to recapture Al-Shirqat. The Iraqi Army withdrew from Khanouga village which was captured by ISIL. Later in the day, ISIL re-entered Shirqat after assaulting it from two axes. The group recaptured the mayor's office, the center of the district and the entertainment city area. Iraqi Army regained full control of the city later in the day.

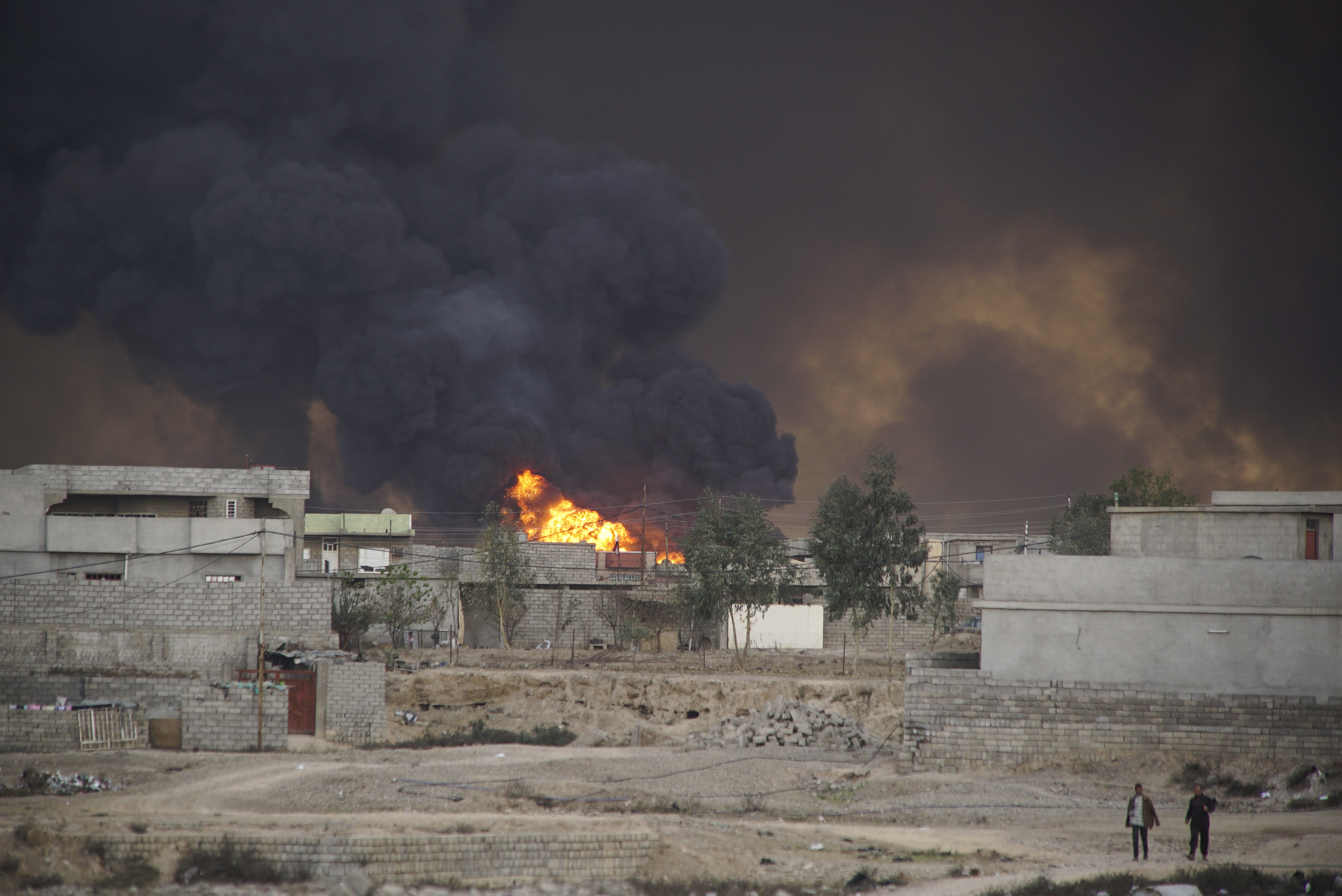
Cityscape of Qayyarah town on fire

On 10 October, 14 fighters of the Popular Mobilization Forces were killed after ISIL fired five Katyusha rockets at Camp Zilkan. On 11 October, an airstrike carried out by US-led coalition in Mosul destroyed the headquarters of Diwan al-Hisbah and killed eight militants.

On 12 October, Iraqi and American officials reported that in order to defend the city, ISIL was preparing car bombs and deploying explosive devices in dug-up holes in major roads to Mosul. Key areas to the city had been blocked off by concrete walls by the group, while a two-metre-deep trench was dug around the city which the group plans to fill with burning oil during the assault on Mosul. The group's fighters had also started shaving their beards to blend in with civilians and were constantly moving their headquarters. On 13 October, it was reported that the group cut four main bridges linking the two sides of Nineveh Governorate using concrete blocks and had also raised the state of alert of its fighters. The group also set oil in trenches around Bashiqa-Khazer axis on fire in order to hinder the airstrikes that target the group.

On 15 October, PMF leader Jabbar al-Mamouri stated that a large military reinforcement including fighters and equipment from PMF as well as the Federal Police had arrived in Qayyarah for the assault on Mosul. Meanwhile, five militants including a leader in charge of booby-trapped drones, were killed in airstrikes carried out by the US-led coalition on an ISIL headquarters in a village near Qayyarah, while seven other militants were wounded.

== Battle for Mosul ==
On 16 October, Prime Minister Haider al-Abadi declared the beginning of assault to recapture the city of Mosul. The assault began with shelling and arrival of armored vehicles to the front lines.

On 17 October, the Peshmerga in Khazer started the ground assault and captured at least nine villages during the day.

The offensive against ISIL consists of a coalition of various ethnic groups, including predominantly Arab Iraqi Army (54,000), Sunni and Shia militia forces (14,000 troops), Kurdish Peshmerga (40,000 troops), and Assyrian militia (5,000 troops),

== Executions ==
On 30 March 2016, ISIL electrocuted at least 15 civilians in the central Bab al-Toub neighborhood of Mosul, for allegedly collaborating with the government and passing information to state officials.

On 7 April, ISIL executed 18 civilians after accusing them of spying for the Kurdish Peshmerga forces and Iraqi army. Eight of them were publicly beheaded in central Mosul, while ten others were burned to death inside a cage in front of hundreds of people.

On 12 April, a source in Nineveh Province stated that ISIL carried out an execution in front of a student's house, in the village of al-Haj Ali in Makhmur District, and in the presence of all the people in the village, for collaborating with the security forces.

On 21 April, ISIS executed at least 250 women when they refused to become sex slaves.

On 2 May, ISIS executed 17 citizens in Mosul for refusing to join the battles against the Iraqi security forces.

On the evening of 8 May, ISIS members executed eight civilians by firing squad in al-Ghazlani camp in central Mosul on charges of collaborating with the opposing security forces, ISIS members filmed the execution of the civilians after being sentenced to death by the so-called Sharia Court in Nineveh Province and threw the bodies in a hole in western part of the city.

On 11 May, ISIS buried alive 45 of their own fighters in Qayyarah for fleeing a battle near Bashir.

On 19 May, in the city of Mosul, ISIS executed 25 suspected spies by lowering them into a tub of nitric acid. According to witnesses, the victims were tied together with rope before being lowered into a basin containing the corrosive acid.

On 22 June, the group executed four of its own commanders for deserting their posts during a battle near Mosul. On 27 July, the group executed 17 of its own commanders for escaping from the frontlines in the battle for the town of Qayyarah.

On 29 July, the group executed 20 civilians alleging that they were cooperating with pro-government forces according to the head of the Nineveh media center. On 20 August, ISIS killed 14 civilians in al-Faisaliah, central Mosul for allegedly collaborating with the pro-government forces. On 23 August, the group executed six of its commanders by flamethrowers for trying to escape to Syria. On August 31, nine youths alleged to be part of an anti-ISIL resistance group were reported to have been executed with electric chainsaws in Mosul.

On 3 September, the group executed 17 of its own members for fleeing from the battle of Qayyarah. The group executed eight civilians on 12 September by drowning them after charging them of collaborating with Iraqi forces and Peshmerga. On 19 September, five workers of internet cafes were executed on the charge of collaborating with Iraqi security forces. On 20 September, the group executed six civilians in Mosul by welding, accusing them of belonging to an anti-ISIL resistance faction. On 22 September, six civilians were burned to death on the charges of spying.

On 24 September, ISIL executed three of its fighters for fleeing during the battle of Shirqat. 25 civilians who were accused of cooperating with Iraqi security forces were also executed in a similar way to animal slaughter. On 26 September, another seven fighters who fled during the battle for Al-Shirqat were reported to have been executed by being trampled to death by a bulldozer.

On 14 October, Reuters reported that the group executed 58 people suspected of taking part in a rebellion plot were executed by drowning in Mosul. The rebellion plot was uncovered more than a week earlier and was led by a local deputy of Abu Bakr al-Baghdadi. They later executed 14 more people.

On 21 October, ISIS executed 284 men and boys after they were rounded up for use as human shields. 550 families were said to have been used as human shields.

== Casualties ==
On 12 April, Nineveh Operations Command announced that hospitals in Nineveh Province received more than 500 bodies of ISIL fighters, during the military operations south of the province, especially in Qayyarah. Khaled al-Obaidi, the Defence Minister of Iraq on 25 June announced that more than 1,300 ISIL militants had been killed since the start of the offensive.

== See also ==
- Interactive Iraq map with current Mosul situation
- ISIS Map
- Al-Shaddadi offensive (2016)
- Battle of Ramadi (2015–16)
- Nineveh Plains offensive
- November 2015 Sinjar offensive
- Siege of Fallujah (2016)
