= Al-Midaina District =

Al-Midaina District Arabic: قضاء المدينة
- District
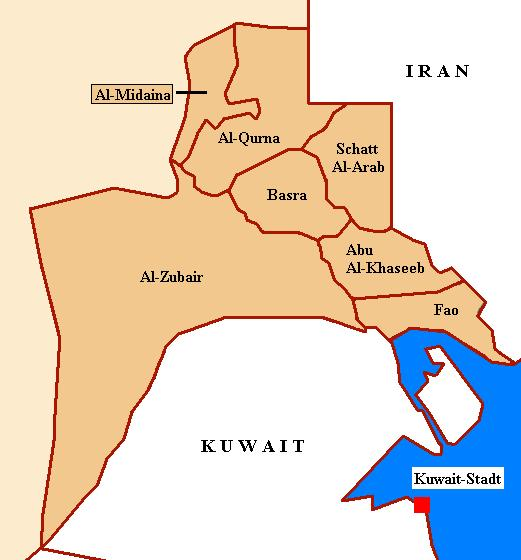
- Districts of Basra Governorate

- Location within Iraq
- Coordinates: 31.01°N 47.32°E
- Country: Iraq
- Governorates: Basra Governorate
- Seat: Al-Midaina

Population (2024)
  - Total: 196,008
- Time zone: UTC+3 (AST)

Al-Midaina District (Arabic: قضاء المدينة) is a district of the Basra Governorate, Iraq spanning the Euphrates River to the west of its confluence with the Tigris. Its seat is the city of Al-Midaina.

== Settlements of Al-Midaina District ==
- Al-Midaina
- Al Sharish
- Ash Shanin
