= Kirkuk (disambiguation) =

Kirkuk may refer to:

- Kirkuk Governorate - a region within Iraq
- Kirkuk District - a district within Kirkuk Governorate
- Kirkuk - a city within Kirkuk District
- Kirkuk Air Base - an air base controlled by the Iraqi Air Force
- Kirkuk–Ceyhan Oil Pipeline - an oil pipeline running from Iraq to Turkey
- Kirkuk FC - an association football club
