= Qaryat al Ḩūrīyah al Jadīdah =

Coordinates: 35°34′13″N 43°13′46″E

Qaryat al Ḩūrīyah al Jadīdah is a village in Al-Shirqat District, Saladin Governorate, Iraq. It is located west of River Tigris and north of the town of Al-Shirqat. By 2016, it was under control of Islamic State of Iraq and the Levant.
