= Luay al-Yassiry =

Iraqi politician

Luay al-Yassiry لؤي الياسري

Governor of Najaf
- Incumbent
- Assumed office 2016-2022
- President: Fuad Masum
- Succeeded by: Majid Al-Waeli

Personal details
- Born: Najaf, Iraq
- Party: Islamic Dawa Party (alleged, denied)

Luay al-Yassiry (Arabic: لؤي الياسري; ) is an Iraqi politician who was the Governor of Najaf in 2016-2022.
