= Aqil Al-Turaihi =

Iraqi politician

Aqil Al-Turaihi نصيف جاسم الخطابي

Governor of Karbala
- Incumbent
- Assumed office 2016
- President: Fuad Masum; Barham Salih

Personal details
- Born: 5 December 1964 (age 61) Karbala, Iraq
- Occupation: doctor & Governor of Karbala

Aqil Al-Turaihi or Aqeel al-Turaihi (Arabic: عقيل الطريحي; ) is an Iraqi politician who has been the Governor of Karbala since 2016.
