= Kerbala District =

Kerbala District قضاء كربلاء
- District
- Interactive map of Kerbala District
- Country: Iraq
- Governorate: Karbala Governorate
- Time zone: UTC+3 (AST)

Kerbala District (Arabic: قضاء كربلاء) is a district of the Karbala Governorate, Iraq.
