= Al-Meshkhab =

- City
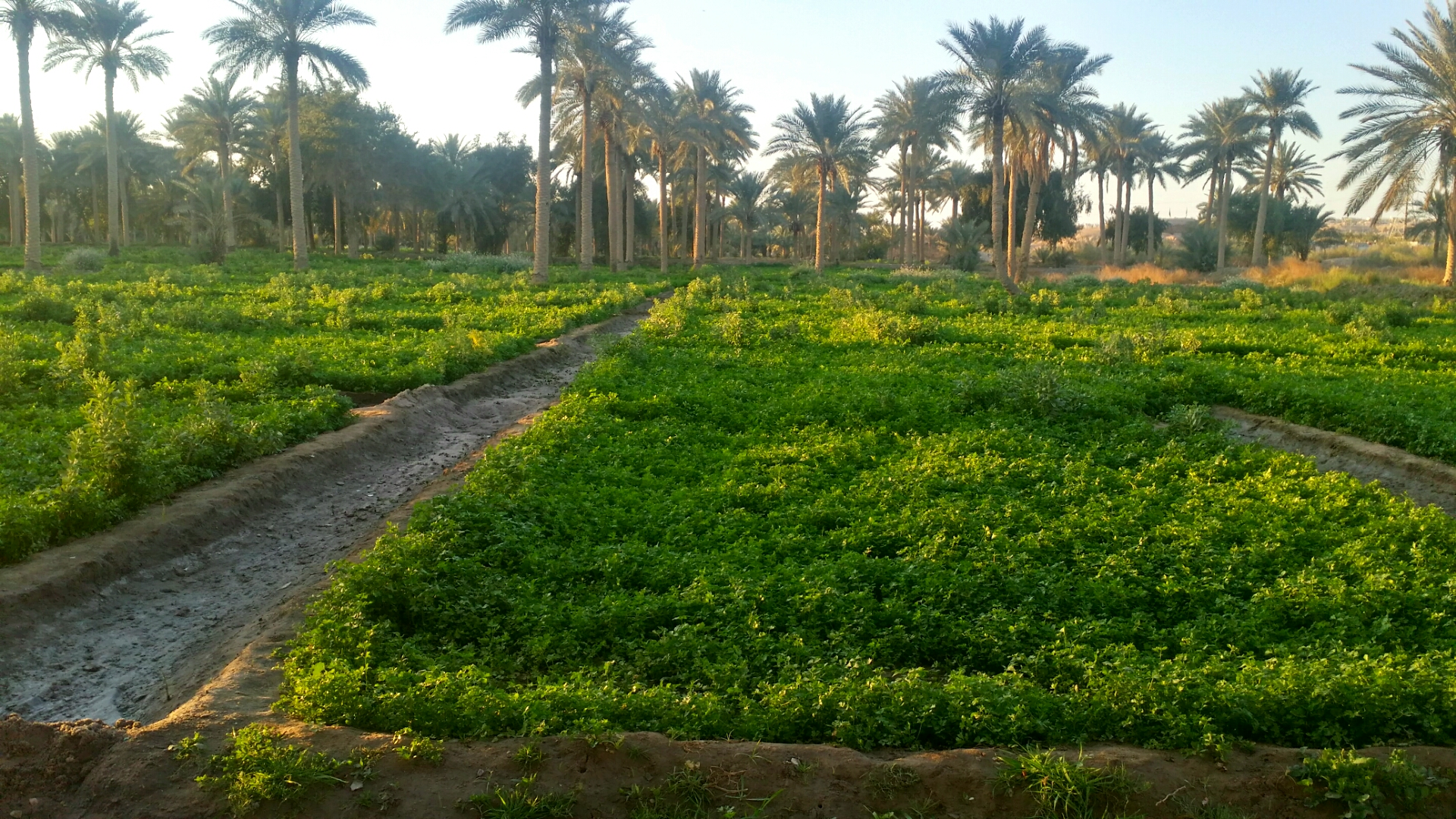
- Interactive map of Al-Meshkhab
- Coordinates: 31.8042°N 44.4892°E
- Country: Iraq
- Governorate: Najaf
- District: Al-Meshkhab

Al-Meshkhab is an Iraqi city and capital of the Al-Meshkhab district situated in the Najaf Governorate, 35 km south of Najaf and 230 km south west of Baghdad. The city is located on the Al-Meshkhab Channel. The majority of the local population consists of Shia Islam belonging to Arabic tribes such as Alzurfy, Muhany and Al-Ghazali. The city was first established as a village in 1916 during the Ottoman Iraq era, promoted to subdistrict then finally upgraded to district capital in 2014.

In 2018 its population was estimated to be north of 140,000.
