= Ain Al-Tamur District =

Ain Al-Tamur District قضاء عين التمر
- District
- Location within Iraq
- Coordinates: 32°34′4″N 43°29′59″E
- Country: Iraq
- Governorate: Karbala Governorate

Population (2024)
  - Total: 33,503
- Time zone: UTC+3 (AST)

Ain Al-Tamur District (Arabic: قضاء عين التمر) is a district of Karbala Governorate, central Iraq. Its population is a 100% Shia.

Karbala Governorate, Ain Al-Tamur in the west
