= Rawah District =

Rawah District Arabic: قضاء راوة
- District
- Location within Iraq
- Country: Iraq
- Governorates: Al Anbar Governorate
- Time zone: UTC+3 (AST)

Rawah (Arabic: قضاء راوة) is a district in Al Anbar Governorate, Iraq. Its capital is the city of Rawah.
