= Al-Khidhir District =

Coordinates: 31.21122°N 45.59095°E

Al-Khidhir District Al-Khidhir قضاء الخضر
- District
- Interactive map of Al-Khidhir District
- Country: Iraq
- Governorates: Al Muthanna Governorate

Area
  - Total: 10,000 km^{2} (3,900 sq mi)

Population
  - Total: 147,312
  - Density: 4/km^{2} (10/sq mi)
- Time zone: UTC+3 (KSA)

Al-Khidhir District (Arabic: قضاء الخضر) is a district of the Al Muthanna Governorate, Iraq.
