= Kirkuk District =

District in Iraq

- District
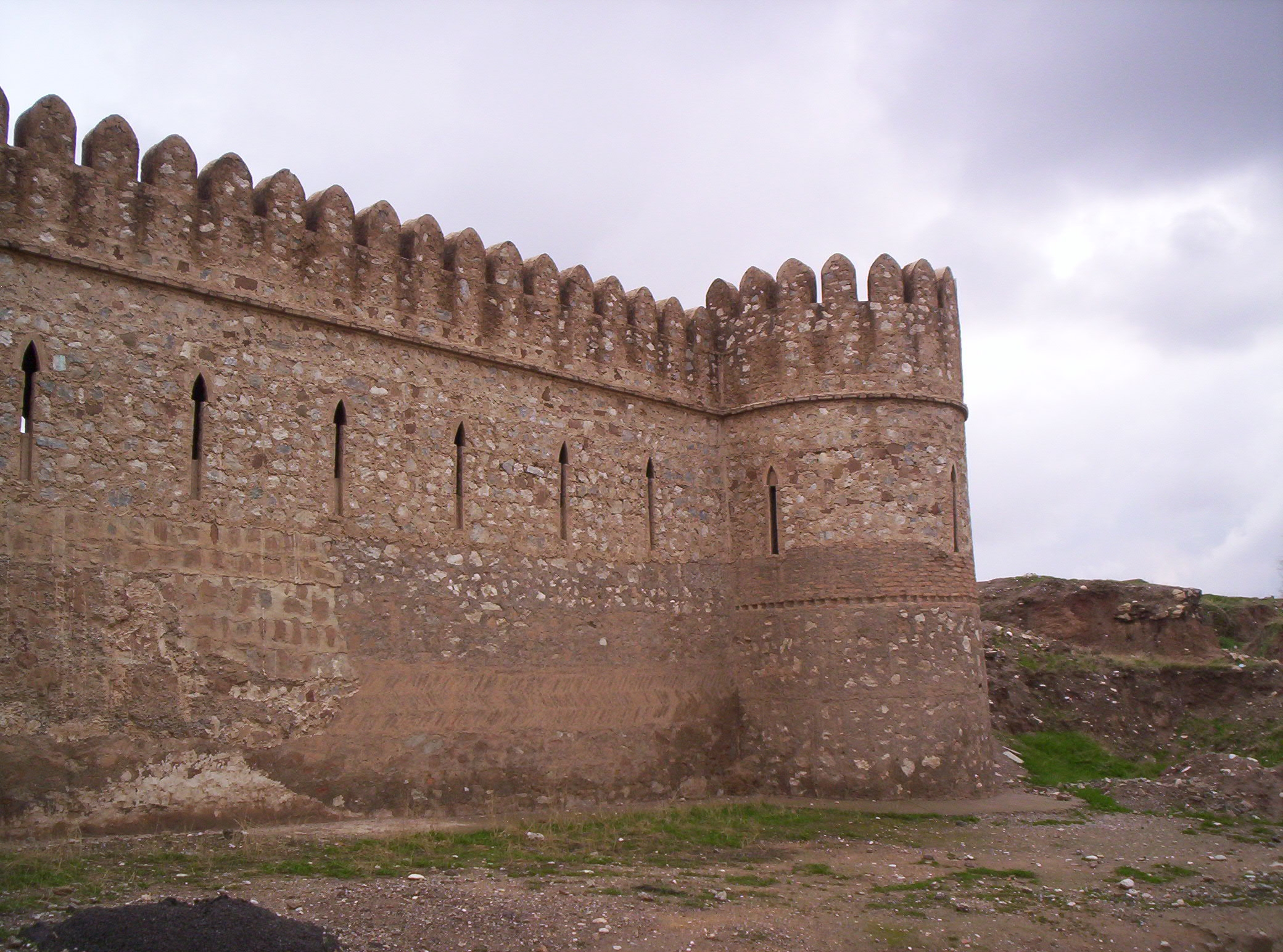
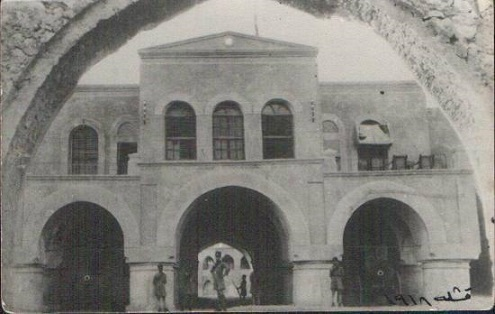
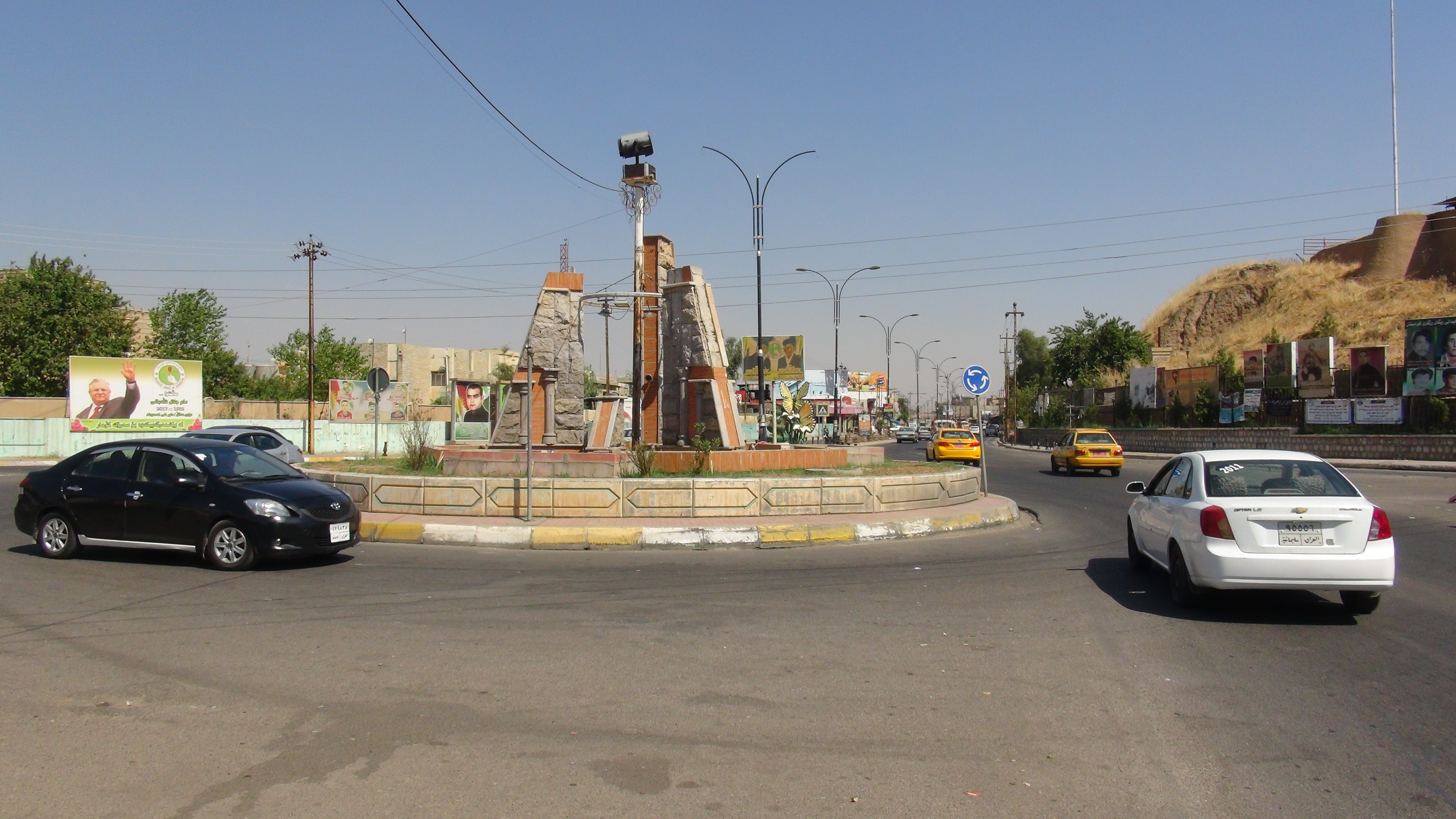
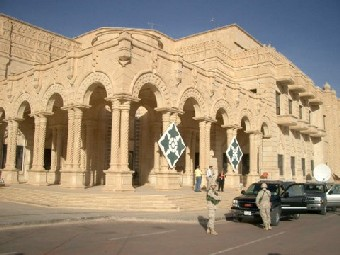
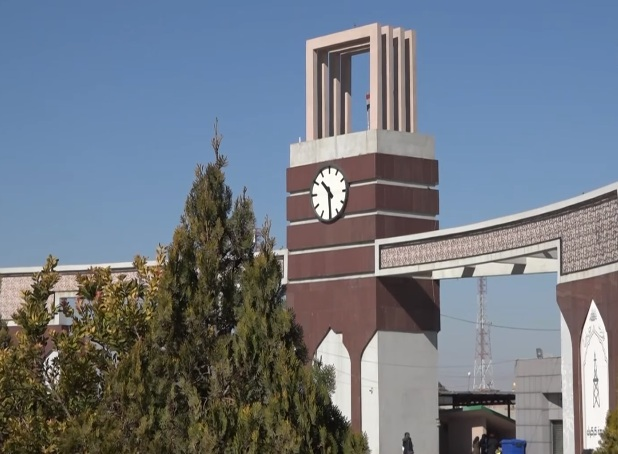
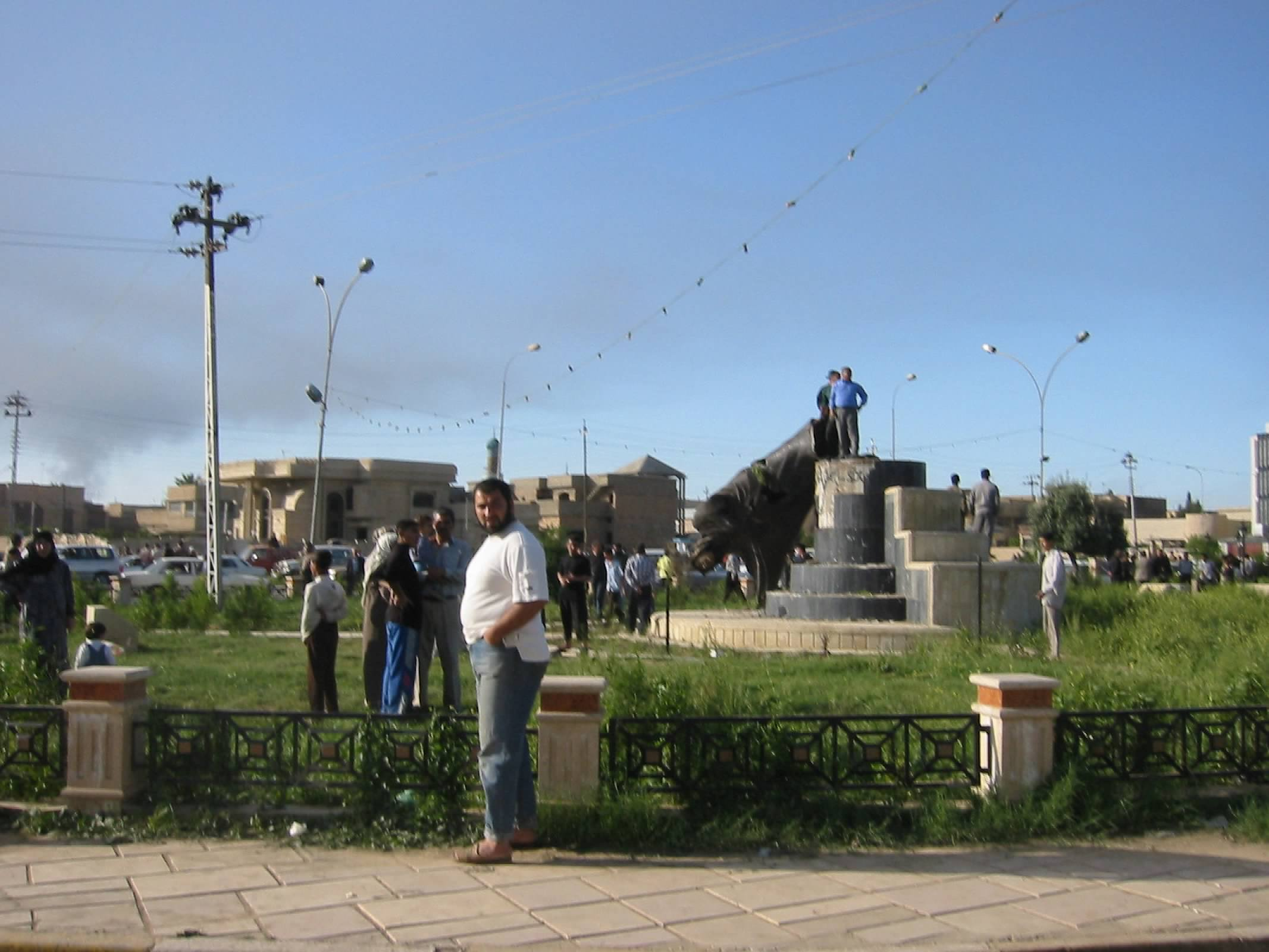

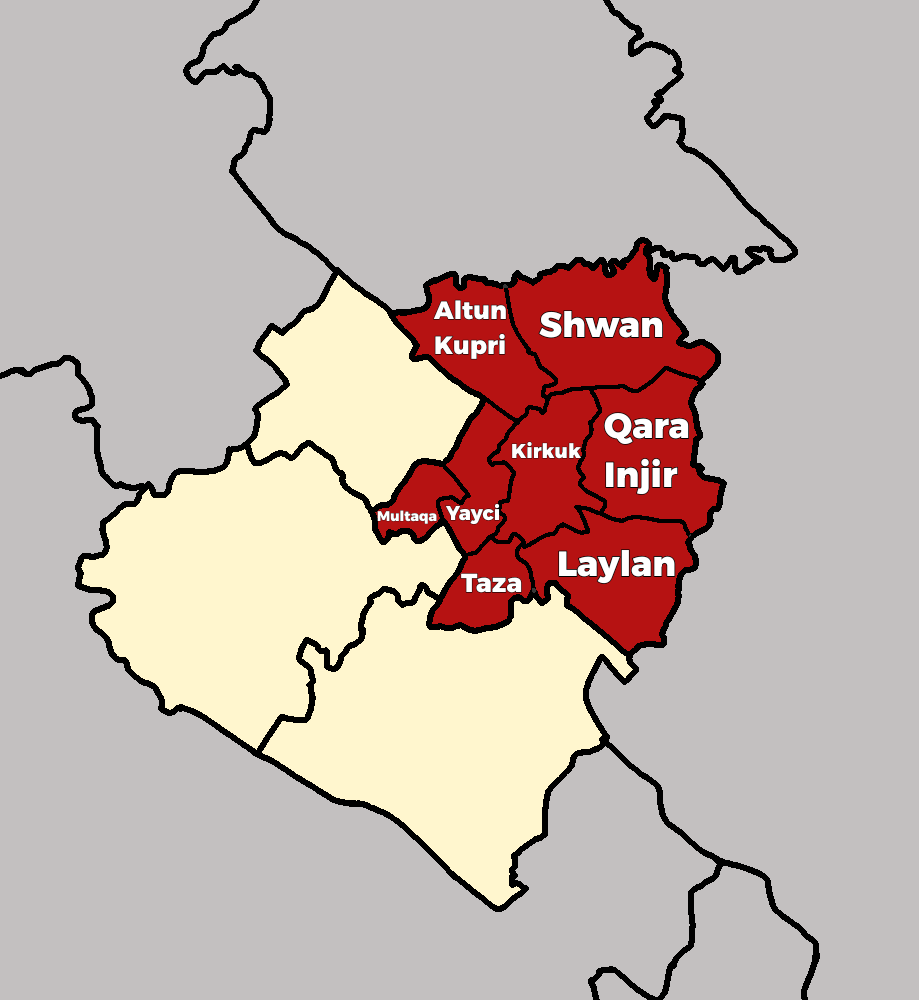
- Location of Kirkuk District within Kirkuk Governorate
- Country: Iraq
- Governorate: Kirkuk Governorate
- Seat: Kirkuk

Area
  - District: 3,525 km^{2} (1,361 sq mi)
- Highest elevation: 1,294 m (4,245 ft)

Population (2024)
  - District: 1,549,454
  - Density: 439.6/km^{2} (1,138/sq mi)
  - Urban: 1,496,035 (73.5%)
  - Rural: 538,592 (26.5%)
- Time zone: UTC+3 (AST)
- Area code: +964 50

Kirkuk District (Arabic: قضاء كركوك, Kurdish: قەزای کەرکووک, Turkish: Kerkük ilçesi) is a district in Kirkuk Governorate, Iraq. Its administrative center is the city of Kirkuk.

The District is bordered by all 3 Districts: Dibis, Daquq and Hawija

District Governor (Qaimaqam): Avesta Sheikh Mohammed
