= Mawat District =

Mawat District قەزای ماوەت
- District
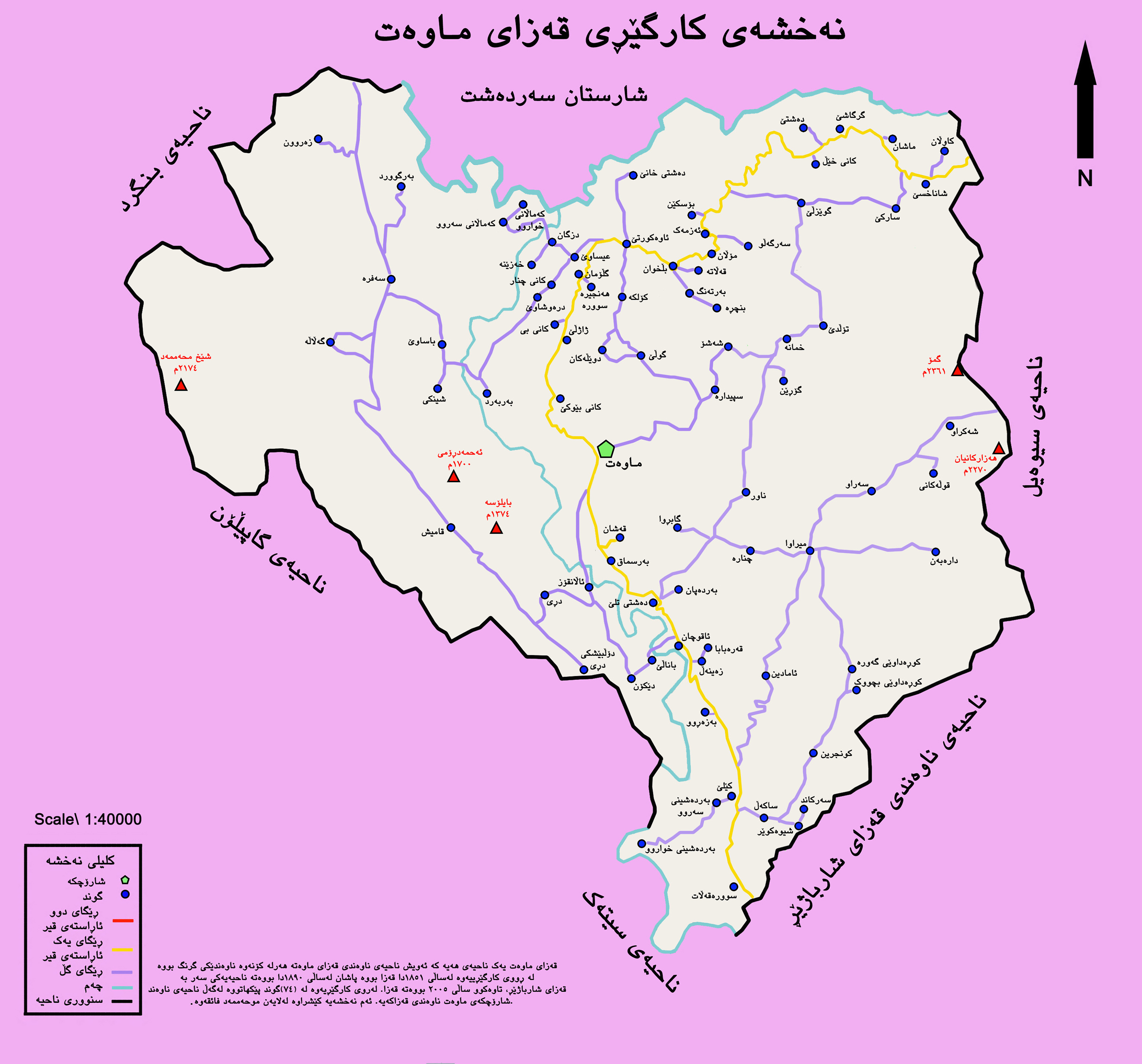
- Map of the district

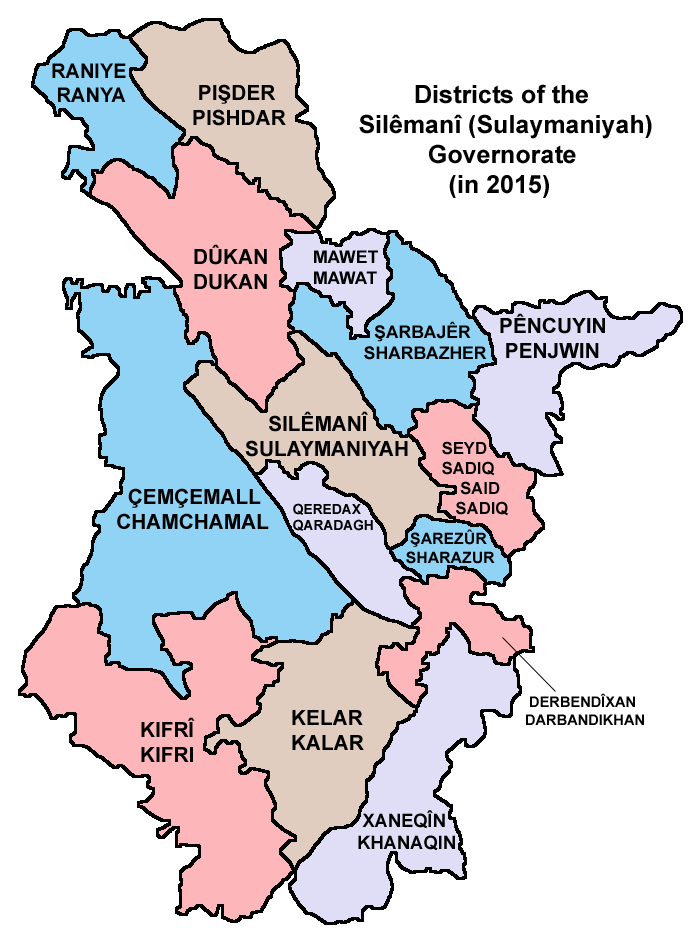
- Districts of Sulaymaniyah Governorate
- Interactive map of Mawat District
- Coordinates: 35°54′N 45°25′E
- Country: Iraq
- Region: Kurdistan Region
- Governorate: Sulaymaniyah
- Seat: Mawat

The Mawat District (Kurdish: قەزای ماوەت, romanized: Qezay Mawet) is a district of Sulaymaniyah Governorate in Kurdistan Region, Iraq. Its main town is Mawat.

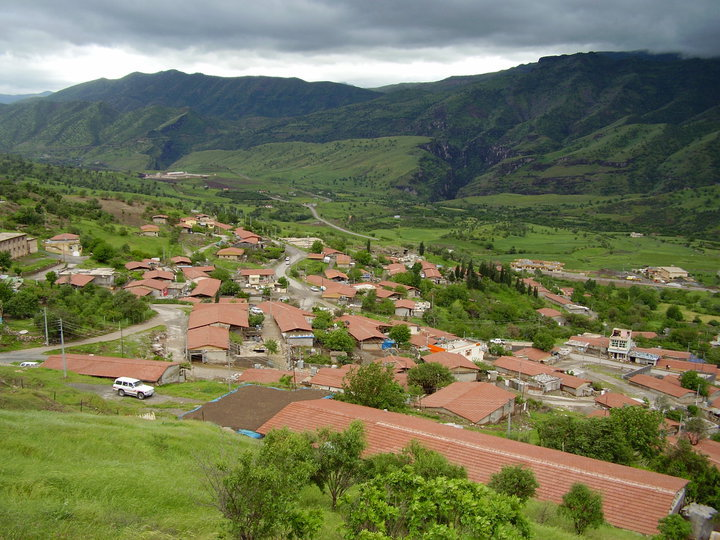
The town of Mawat
