= Ash Shanin =

Location within Al-Basrah, Iraq

Ash Shanin (الشنين ) is a village in the Al-Midaina District of Basrah Governorate in southern Iraq located on the south bank of the Euphrates River opposite the confluence with the Tigris River.

== Geography ==
It is on the west side of the Shatt Al-Arab River and linked with Al Qurnah by a road bridge. The topography is flat, the elevation is 4m above sea level and the climate arid. It is contiguous with the village of Al Sharish.

== History ==
During the First World War the battle of Qurna was fought in this area. The area suffered greatly during the Iran–Iraq War, during which it was a major battlefield, and again after the 1991 Iraqi uprising.
