= Al-Manathera District =

- District
- Location within Iraq
- Coordinates: 31.79653°N 44.41161°E
- Country: Iraq
- Governorate: Najaf Governorate
- Time zone: UTC+3 (AST)

Al-Manathera District is a district of the Najaf Governorate, Iraq.
