= Mawat, Iraq =

Village in Iraq

Mawat ماوەت ماوت
- Village
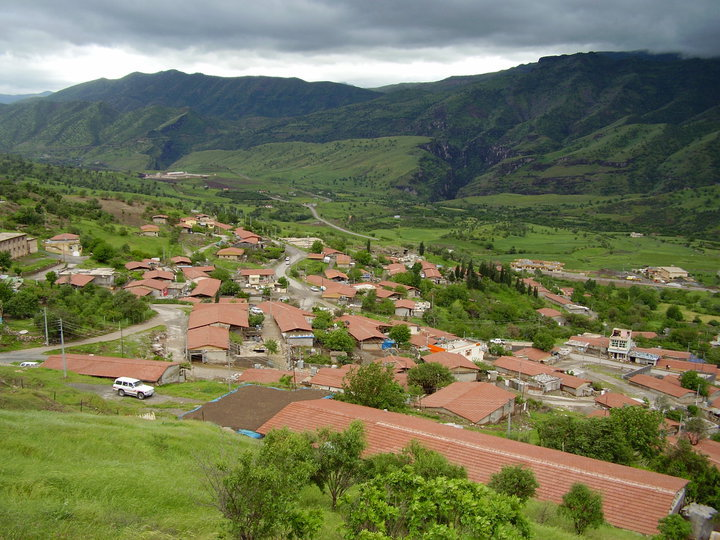

- Location in Iraq Mawat (Iraqi Kurdistan)
- Coordinates: 35°54′N 45°25′E
- Country: Iraq
- Region: Kurdistan Region
- Governorate: Sulaymaniyah Governorate
- District: Mawat District
- Sub-district: Mawat

Population (2014)
  - Village: 8,699
  - Urban: 1,464
  - Rural: 7,235

Mawat (Arabic: ماوت; Sorani Kurdish: ماوەت, romanized: Mawet) is a village and subdistrict in Sulaymaniyah Governorate in the Kurdistan Region, Iraq. It is located in Mawat District, and serves as the district’s main town, with a population of 1,464 urban residents and 7,235 rural residents. The village is known for its steep and rugged terrain.

== Local economy ==
The main source of income for the population of Mawat is agriculture, supported by the widespread presence of agricultural fields and orchards. However, cross-border smuggling of fuels and other goods also play a pivotal role in the economy, this activity has consequently resulted in environmental impacts upon the Little Zab River.

== History and Conflicts ==
During the Iran Iraq War, the town came under key military operations such Operation Karbala 10, where Iranian and PUK forces advanced in Sulaymaniyah and captured areas around Mawat. The area was heavily mined during this conflict.

Following the war, the PKK began operations in the area due to its mountainous environment and its proximity to both Turkey and Iran. This has resulted in a period of Turkish air strikes in the region aimed at combatting the PKK presence.

== Ecology and Conservation ==
Nature Iraq’s Key Biodiversity Area report on Mawat highlights its ecological importance within the Zagros landscape, noting moderate grazing, native plant communities, and the need for habitat protection measures.
