= Al-Tarmia District =

Al-Tarmia District قضاء الطارمية
- District
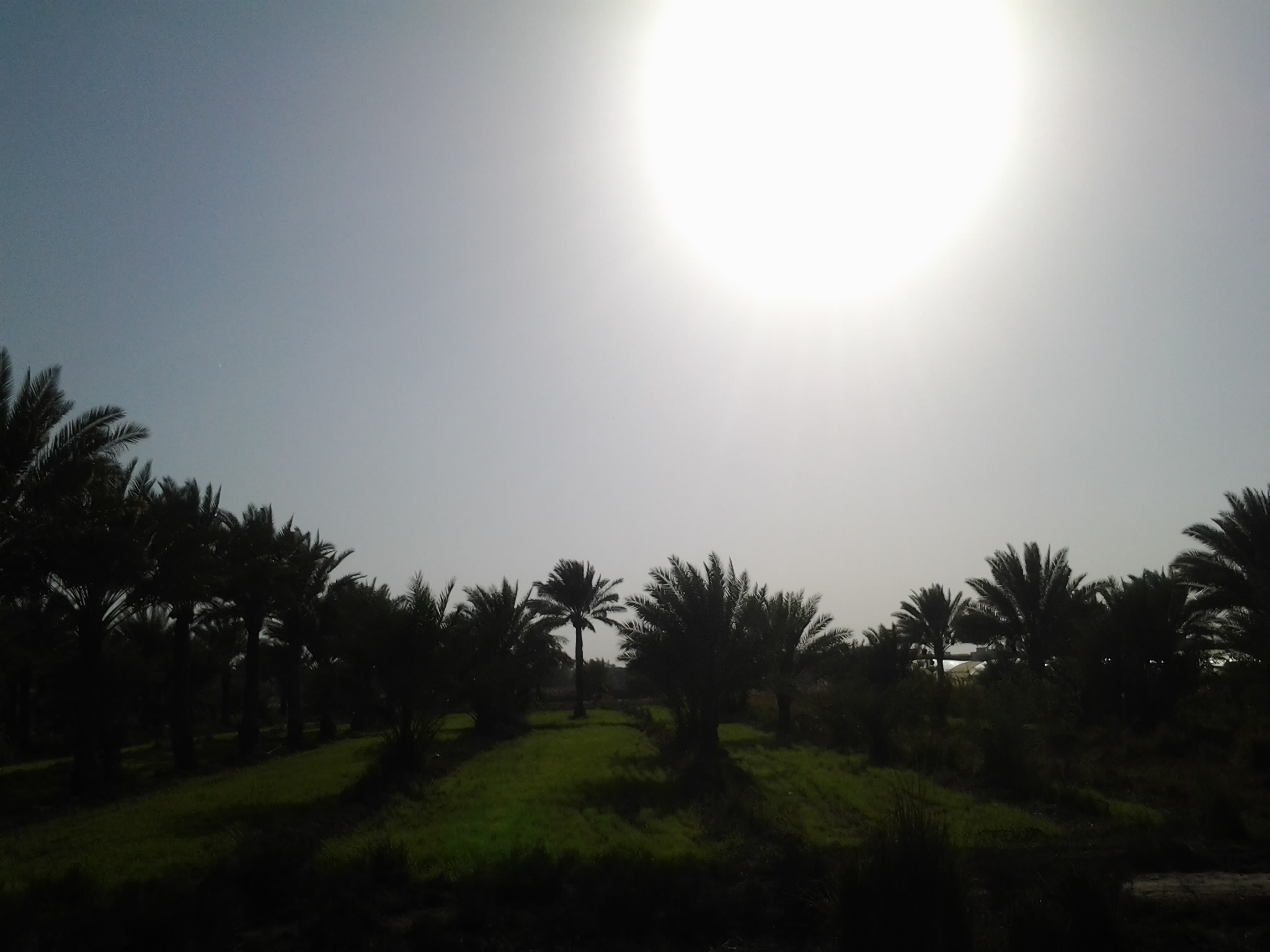
- Orchard in Al Tarmia District

- Location within Iraq
- Coordinates: 33.66435°N 44.37378°E
- Country: Iraq
- Governorate: Baghdad Governorate
- Time zone: UTC+3 (AST)

Al Tarmia District is a district of the Baghdad Governorate, Iraq.
