= Al-Ba'aj =

Al-Ba’aj بعاج (Arabic)
- Location within Iraq
- Coordinates: 36°3′N 41°43′E
- Country: Iraq
- Governorate: Nineveh
- District: Al-Ba'aj
- Occupation: Iraqi Armed Forces
- Elevation: 310 m (1,020 ft)

Population (2012)
  - Total: 13,746
- Time zone: UTC+3 (AST)

Ba'aj (Arabic: بعاج; also spelt Ba'ej) is a town in the Al-Ba'aj District of Nineveh Governorate, Iraq. The town was under control of the Islamic State until June 4 2017, when Shia paramilitaries captured it.

The town of Al-Ba'aj is populated by Sunni Arabs.
