= Al-Rumaitha District =

Al-Rumaitha District قضاء الرميثة
- District
- Location within Iraq
- Coordinates: 31.49777°N 45.29542°E
- Country: Iraq
- Governorates: Al Muthanna Governorate
- Time zone: UTC+3 (AST)

Al-Rumaitha District (Arabic: قضاء الرميثة) is a district of the Al Muthanna Governorate, Iraq.
