= As-Samawah District =

As-Samawah District قضاء السماوة
- District
- Location in Iraq
- Coordinates: 31°13′35″N 45°15′43″E
- Country: Iraq
- Governorate: Al Muthanna Governorate

Area
  - Total: 475.8 km^{2} (183.7 sq mi)

Population (2024 (est.))
  - Total: 373,770
- Time zone: UTC+3 (AST)

As-Samawah District (also Al-Samawa) (Arabic: قضاء السماوة) is a district of the Al Muthanna Governorate, Iraq. It has an area of 475.8 square kilometres (183.7 sq mi) and as of 2018 had an estimated population of 300,458. The capital of the district is the city of Samawah (As-Samawah).
