= List of governorates of Iraq by Human Development Index =

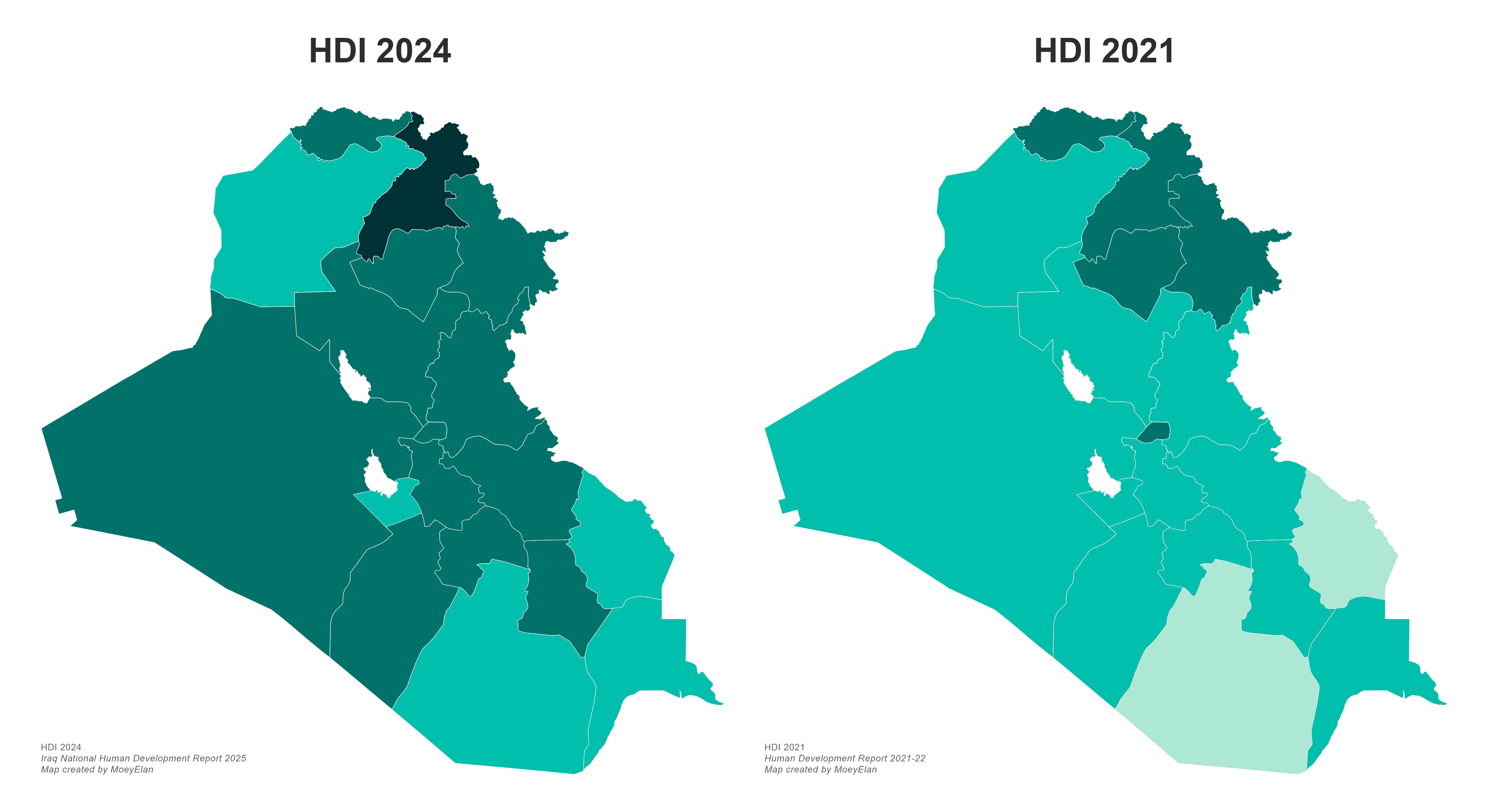
Map of Iraqi Provinces by Human Development Index in 2021 and 2024 > 0.750 0.700 – 0.749 0.650 – 0.699 < 0.649

This is a list of Governorates of Iraq by Human Development Index as of 2025 with data for the year 2021 and 2024.

== List ==
Rank	Region	HDI (2024)	HDI (2021)
1	Erbil	0.751	0.702
2	Kirkuk	0.738	0.705
3	Sulaymaniyah	0.737	0.704
4	Saladin	0.736	0.692
5	Dohuk	0.726	0.701
6	Al Anbar	0.723	0.68
7	Babylon	0.722	0.682
8	Diyala	0.719	0.695
9	Wasit	0.718	0.656
10	Najaf	0.715	0.655
11	Dhi Qar	0.706	0.684
12	Baghdad	0.700	0.704
12	Al-Qādisiyyah	0.700	0.678
13	Nineveh	0.699	0.695
14	Karbala	0.693	0.666
15	Basra	0.689	0.664
16	Maysan	0.676	0.635
17	Muthanna	0.673	0.644
-	Iraq (average)	0.712	0.686

== See also ==
- List of countries by Human Development Index
