= Dibis District =

Dibis District قضاء الدبس
- District
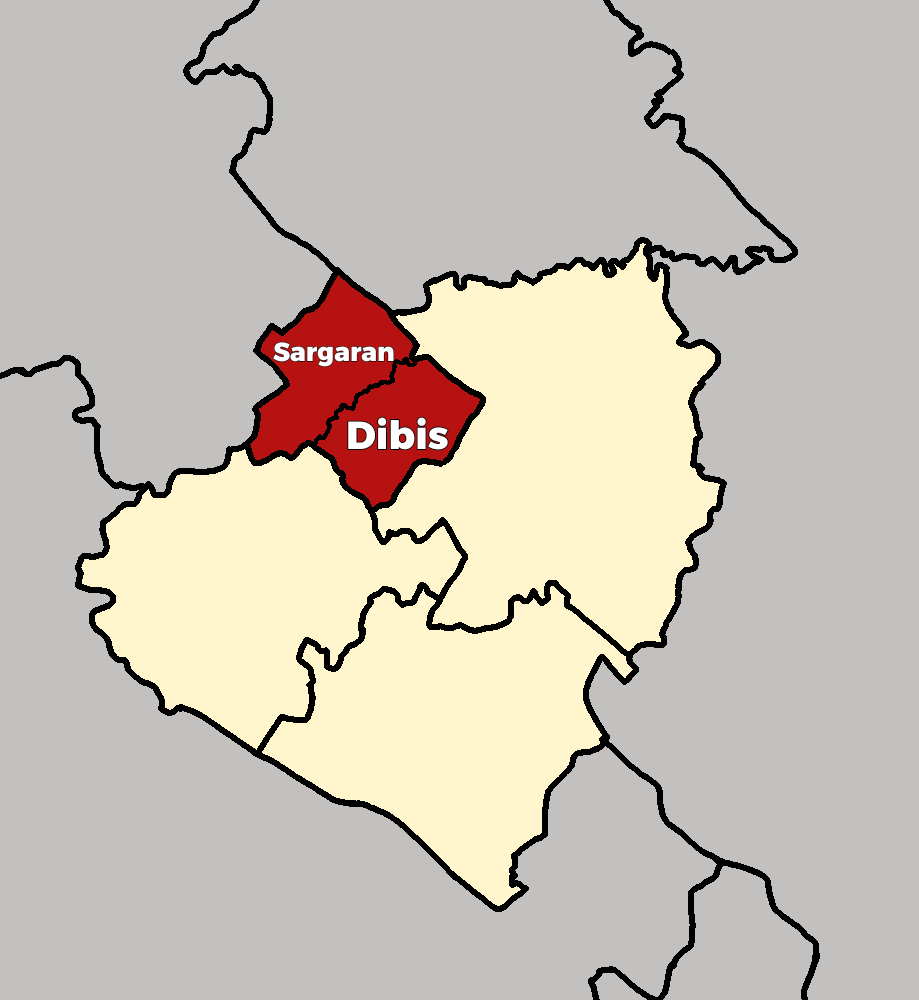
- Location of Dibis District within Kirkuk Governorate
- Country: Iraq
- Governorate: Kirkuk Governorate
- Seat: Dibis

Area
  - Total: 1,716 km^{2} (663 sq mi)

Population (2024)
  - Total: 78,101
  - Density: 45.51/km^{2} (117.9/sq mi)
- Time zone: UTC+3 (AST)
- Area code: +964 50

Dibis District (Arabic: قضاء الدبس, romanized: qaḍāʾ al-Dubs) is a district in Kirkuk Governorate, Iraq. Its administrative center is the town of Dibis.

Sargaran subdistrict has a Kurdish majority with an Arab minority. Markaz Dibis subdistrict has a Kurdish majority with Arab, Turkmen, and Christian minorities.

Subdistrict	Population in 2024
Dibis	54,614
Sargaran	23,487
Total	78,101

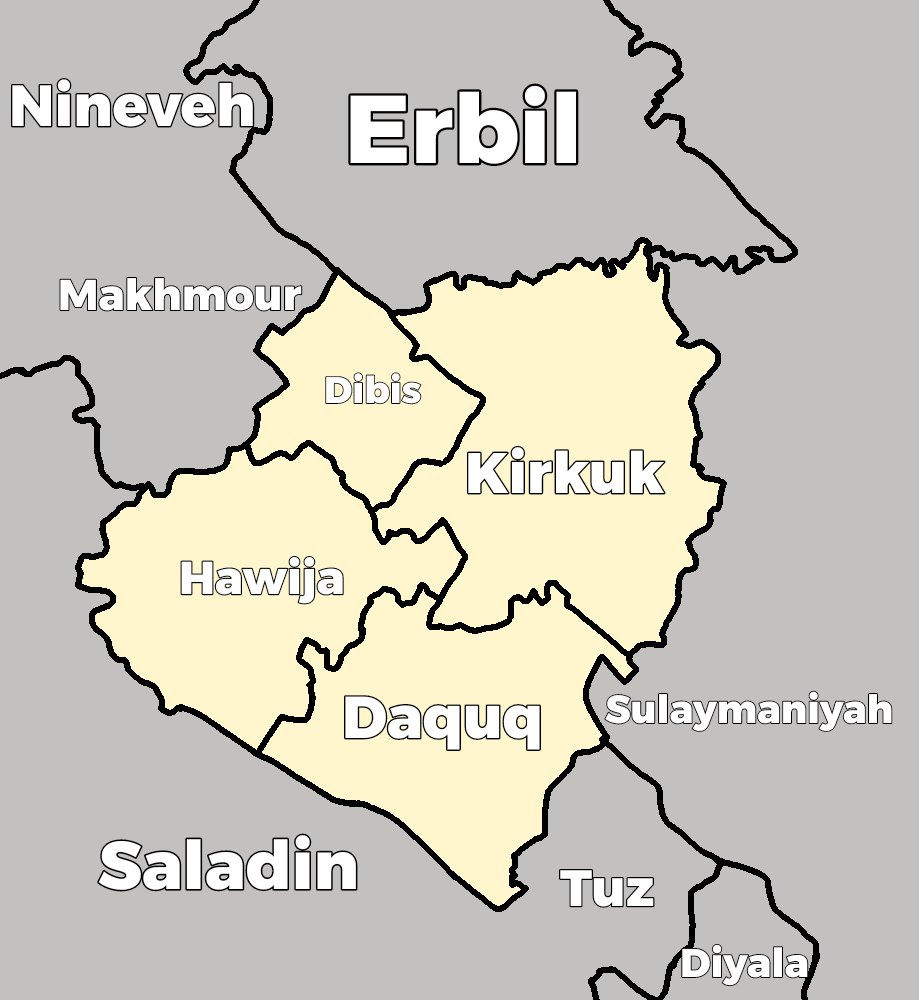
Districts of Kirkuk Governorate
