= Al-Ba'aj District =

Coordinates: 35.62057°N 41.68183°E

Al-Ba'aj District Arabic: بعاج
- District
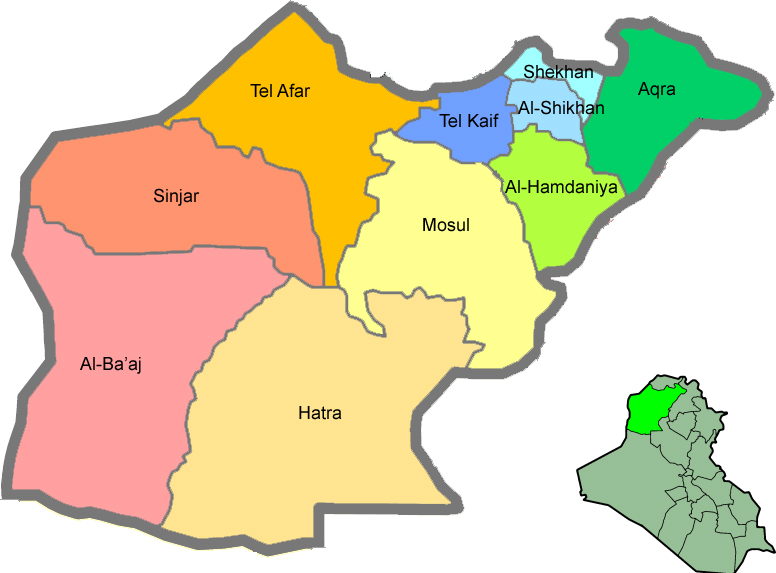
- Al-Ba'aj District (light pink) in Ninawa
- Interactive map of Al-Ba'aj District
- Country: Iraq
- Governorate: Nineveh
- Seat: Al-Ba'aj

Population (2024)
  - Total: 121,075
- Time zone: UTC+3 (AST)

Al-Ba'aj District (Arabic: بعاج) is a district in Nineveh Governorate, Iraq. Its administrative center is the city of Al-Ba'aj. Other settlements include Qaryat al-Sakar and Al-Jughaifi. The district is predominantly populated by Sunni Arabs.
