= Al-Meshkhab District =

District of Iraq

Coordinates: 31.8°N 44.49°E

Al-Meshkhab is a district located in Najaf Governorate. Its seat is the city of Al-Meshkhab. Soil of Al-Meshkhab is fertile, alluvial, and well irrigated by Meshkhab Channel (derived from Euphrates River). Agriculture is main source of income in Al-Meshkhab. crops such as rice, Date palm, and wheat are planted there densely. total inhabitants are Arab Shia Islam.
