= Afaq =

Afaq is a masculine given name of Arabic origin. Notable people with the name include:

- Afaq Ahmed (born 1962), Pakistani politician
- Afaq Hussain (1939–2002), Pakistani cricketer
- Afaq Khoja (1626–1694), Uyghur political and religious leader
- Afaq Raheem (born 1985), Pakistani cricketer
