= Al Sharish, Iraq =

Village in Basrah Governorate, Iraq

Al-Basrah in Iraq.30°59′29″N 47°26′43″E

Al Sharish (الشرش ) is a village of Basrah Governorate in Iraq between the Shatt al Arab and Hammar Marshes. It is located at 47.4465n, 30.986e and is contiguous with the village of Ash Shanin.

It has a primary and a Girls school and police station.

== Geography ==
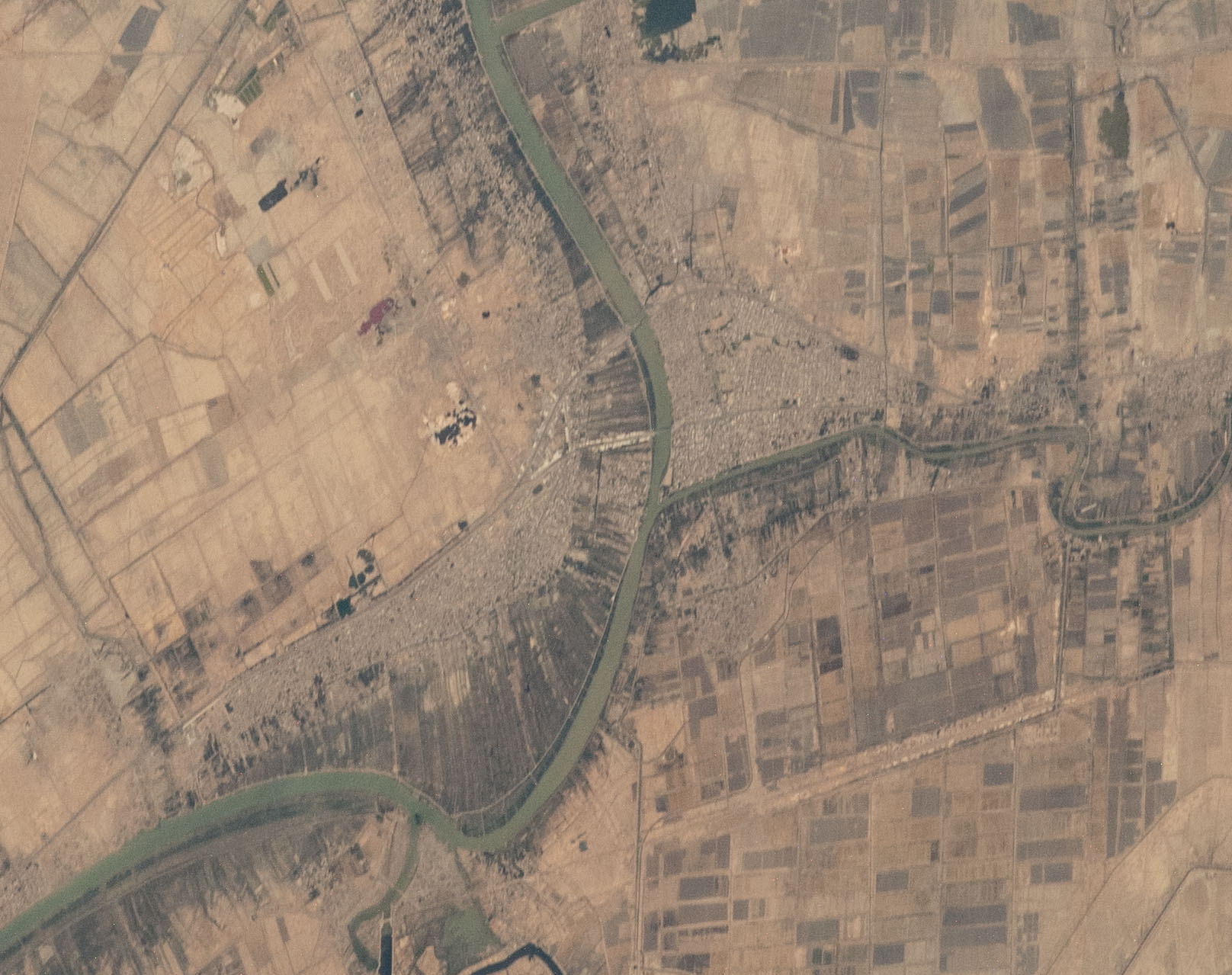
the region from above, Shatt al-Arab, Al Qurna (Al-Qurnah), Euphrates and Tigris, agriculture

It is on the east side of the Shatt Al-Arab River and the Iranian border.

The topography is flat, the elevation is 5m above sea level and the climate arid.

The village is near the Hammah Marshes and many of the inhabitants are Marsh Arabs. The area suffered greatly during the Iran–Iraq War, during which it was a major battlefield, and again after the 1991 Iraqi uprising.
