= Al-Shirqat District =

Coordinates: 35.5292°N 43.21998°E

Al-Shirqat District Arabic: الشرقاط Qaḑā’ ash Sharqāţ
- District
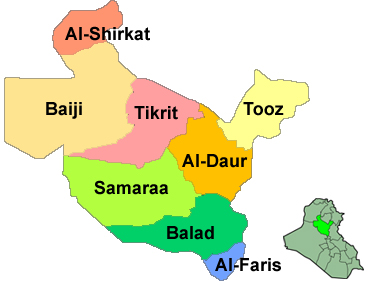
- Saladin districts
- Interactive map of Al-Shirqat District
- Country: Iraq
- Governorate: Saladin
- Seat: Al-Shirqat
- Time zone: UTC+3 (AST)

Al-Shirqat District (Arabic: الشرقاط) is a district of Saladin Governorate, Iraq. The district's capital is the town of Al-Shirqat. Other settlements include Khanugiyah, Mukhayim, Qaryat al Ḩūrīyah al Jadīdah, Al-Khadraniyah, Aynah, Ijamasa, and Jamaf. The ancient site of Assur is also located in the district.

The district was captured by the Islamic State in 2014. The senior Islamic State military commander Abu Omar al-Shishani was reported to have been killed in fighting in al-Shirqat in July 2016. The town was recaptured on 22 September 2016. More than 160,000 people were displaced from Sharqat due to Islamic State occupation.
