= Najaf Governorate =

Governorate of Iraq

Najaf Governorate محافظة النجف
- Governorate
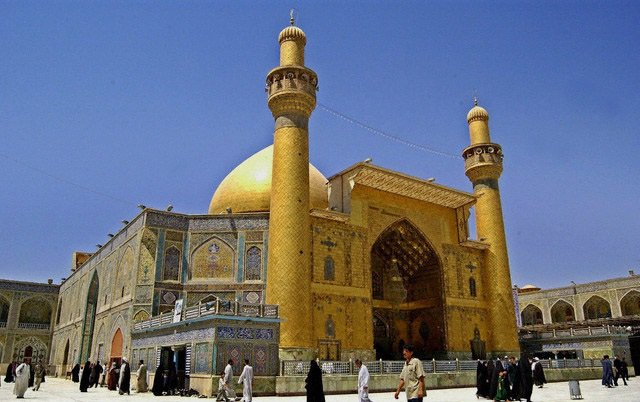
- Imam Ali Mosque

- Seal

- Coordinates: 31°7′N 43°48′E
- Country: Iraq
- Capital: Najaf

Government
  - Governor: Yusuf Kinawi

Area
  - Total: 28,824 km^{2} (11,129 sq mi)

Population (2024 census)
  - Total: 1,950,833
  - Density: 67.681/km^{2} (175.29/sq mi)
- ISO 3166 code: IQ-NA
- HDI (2024): 0.715 high · 10th of 18
- Website: https://najaf.iq/

Najaf Governorate (Arabic: محافظة النجف, romanized: Muḥāfażat an-Najaf) is a governorate in central and southern Iraq. The capital is the city of Najaf, with another major city being Al Kufah. Both cities are holy to Shia Muslims, who form the vast majority of the population.

== Provincial government ==
- Governor: Yusuf Kinawi
- Deputy Governor: Ammar al-Jazairi
- Provincial Council Chairman (PCC): Hussein al-Isawi
- Deputy PCC: Ghayth Sheba

== Politics ==
Results of the 2023 provincial elections (seats):

- We Build Alliance (3)
- State of Law Coalition (3)
- al-Wafaa Movement (2)
- National State Forces Alliance (2)
- Abshir Ya Iraq (1)
- Idrak Movement (1)
- Wathiqun (1)
- Qiyam Civil Coalition (1)
- Medar (1)

== Districts ==
- Najaf District
- Kufa District
- Al-Manathera District
- Al-Meshkhab District
