= Al-Midaina =

Human settlement in Iraq

Coordinates: 30.953313°N 47.268684°E

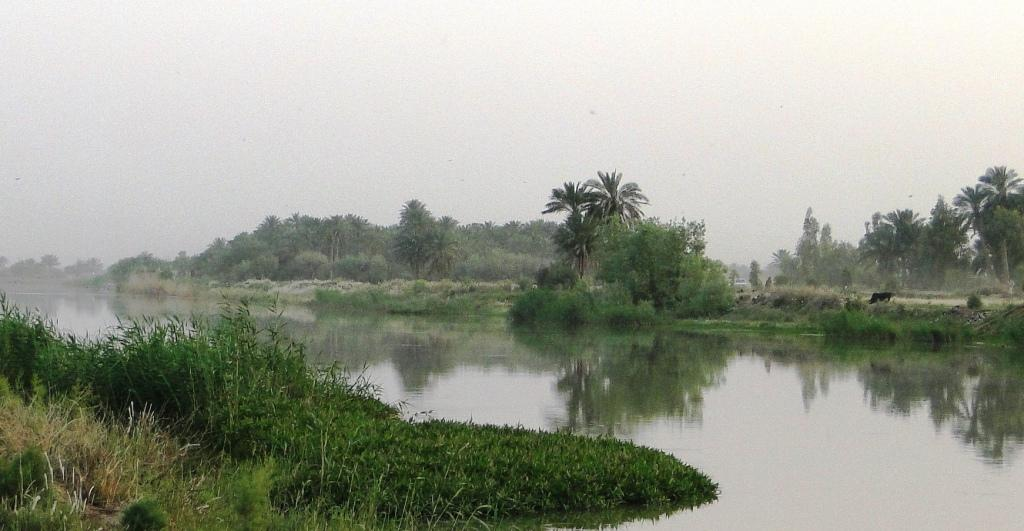

Al-Midaina (Arabic: المدينة) is a city in the Basrah Governorate of Iraq.
