= Karbala Governorate =

Governorate of Iraq

Karbala Governorate محافظة كربلاء
- Governorate
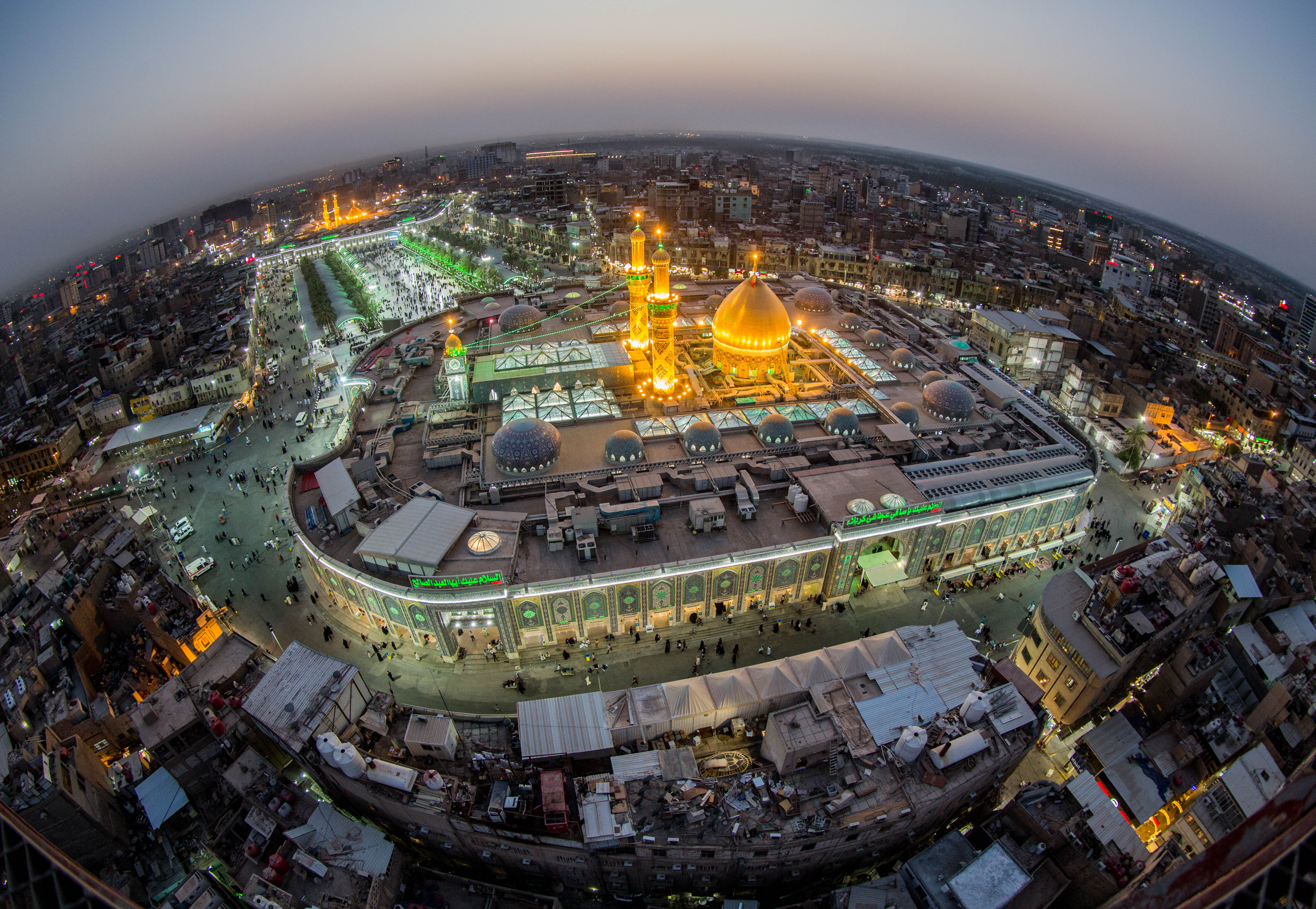
- Aerial view of the shrine of Imam Hussain

- Seal

- Coordinates: 32°27′N 43°48′E
- Country: Iraq
- Capital: Karbala

Government
  - Governor: Nassif Jassim al-Khattabi

Area
  - Total: 5,034 km^{2} (1,944 sq mi)

Population (2024 census)
  - Total: 1,754,065
  - Density: 348.4/km^{2} (902.5/sq mi)
- ISO 3166 code: IQ-KA
- HDI (2024): 0.693 medium · 14th of 18
- Website: karbala.gov.iq

Karbala Governorate (Arabic: محافظة كربلاء, Muḥāfażat Karbalāʾ) is a governorate in central Iraq. Its administrative center is the city of Karbala, a holy city for Shia Muslims for housing the shrine of the revered Imam Hussein. The population is majority Shia. The governorate includes part of the artificial Lake Milh.

== Provincial government ==
Districts

- Governor: Nassif Jassim al-Khattabi
- Deputy Governor: Ali al-Meyali
- Provincial Council Chairman (PCC): Qassim al-Yesari
- Deputy PCC: Mahfudh al-Tamimi

== Politics ==
Results of the 2023 Provincial elections (seats):

- Ibdaa' Karbala (7)
- State of Law Coalition (2)
- We Build Alliance (2)
- Abshir Ya Iraq (1)
- National State Forces Coalition (1)

== Demographics ==
Historical population
Year	Pop.	±% p.a.
1977	269,800	—
1987	469,282	+5.69%
1997	594,235	+2.39%
2009	1,013,254	+4.55%
2024	1,754,065	+3.73%
Source: Citypopulation

== Districts ==
- Ain Al-Tamur
- Al-Hindiya (Tuwayrij)
- Karbala
