= Al-Shirqat =

Al-Shirqat Arabic: الشرقاط Sharqat
- Town
- Location within Iraq
- Coordinates: 35°30′13″N 43°13′57″E
- Country: Iraq
- Governorate: Saladin
- District: Al-Shirqat
- Time zone: UTC+3 (AST)

Al-Shirqat is a town west of the Tigris in Saladin Governorate, Iraq, located 294 kilometres (183 mi) northwest of Baghdad. It is the main town of the Al-Shirqat District, and is near the ruins of the ancient Assyrian city of Assur.

== History ==
In 1918, the Battle of Sharqat between British and Ottoman forces was fought at the town as part of the wider Mesopotamian campaign for control over Ottoman Iraq.

The Islamic State of Iraq and the Levant took control of the town during their June 2014 offensive. In June 2016, Iraqi forces moved towards the town.

The senior Islamic State military commander Abu Omar al-Shishani was reported to have been killed in fighting in al-Shirqat in July 2016. On 22 September 2016, Iraqi security forces recaptured the town from IS. More than 160,000 people were displaced from Sharqat due to Islamic State's occupation of the town.

== Climate ==
Al-Shirqat has a hot semi-arid climate (Köppen climate classification BSh). Most rain falls in the winter. The average annual temperature in Al-Shirqat is 21.3 °C (70.3 °F). About 266 mm (10.47 in) of precipitation falls annually.

Climate data for Al-Shirqat
Month	Jan	Feb	Mar	Apr	May	Jun	Jul	Aug	Sep	Oct	Nov	Dec	Year
Mean daily maximum °C (°F)	13.6 (56.5)	16.3 (61.3)	20.3 (68.5)	26.2 (79.2)	33.8 (92.8)	39.9 (103.8)	43.2 (109.8)	42.9 (109.2)	38.9 (102.0)	31.9 (89.4)	23.0 (73.4)	15.7 (60.3)	28.8 (83.9)
Mean daily minimum °C (°F)	3.6 (38.5)	5.0 (41.0)	7.9 (46.2)	12.2 (54.0)	17.7 (63.9)	22.1 (71.8)	25.1 (77.2)	24.4 (75.9)	20.1 (68.2)	14.7 (58.5)	9.3 (48.7)	4.6 (40.3)	13.9 (57.0)
Average precipitation mm (inches)	46 (1.8)	40 (1.6)	49 (1.9)	34 (1.3)	11 (0.4)	0 (0)	0 (0)	0 (0)	0 (0)	10 (0.4)	31 (1.2)	45 (1.8)	266 (10.5)
Source: Climate-Data.org, Climate data
