= Ranya District =

Ranya قەزای ڕانیە
- District
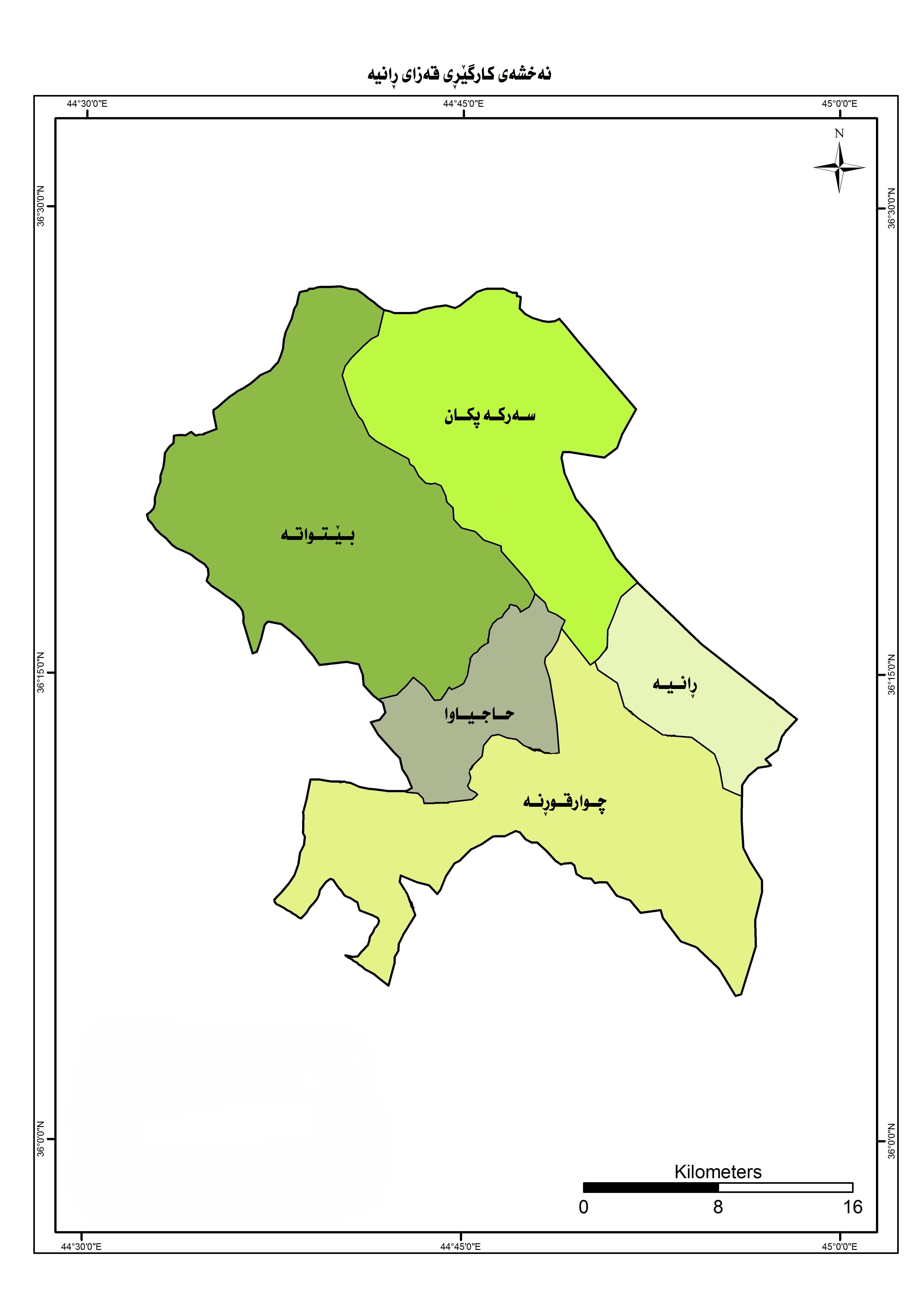
- Map of the district
- Nickname: قەزای ڕاپەڕین
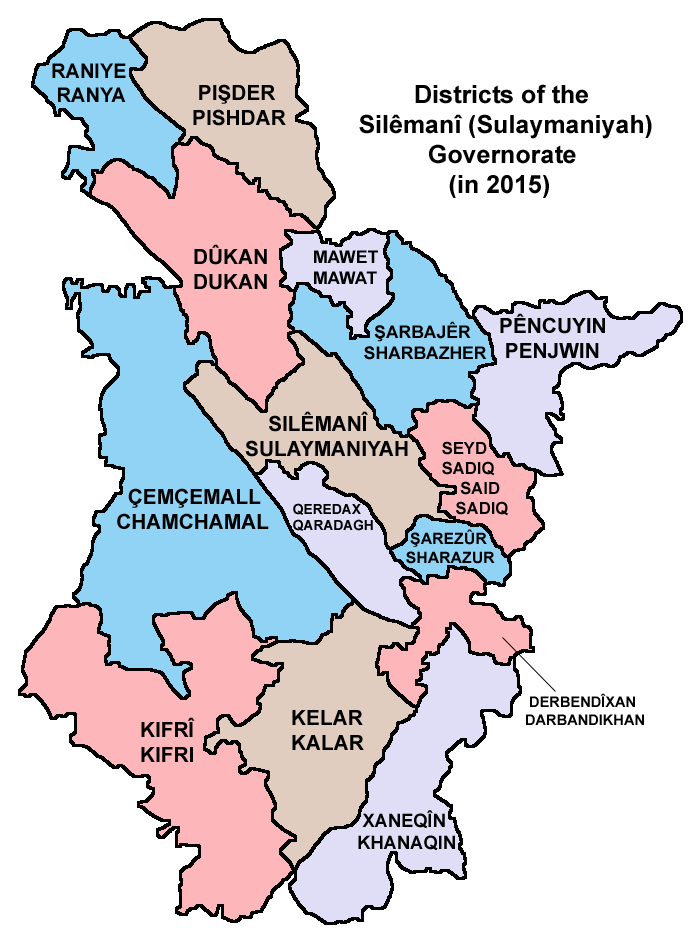
- Districts of the Sulaymaniyah Governorate
- Coordinates: 35°33′0″N 45°26′0″E
- Country: Iraq
- Autonomous region: Kurdistan Region
- Governorate: Sulaymaniyah
- Established: 1942
- Elevation: 2,895 ft (882 m)

Population (2007)
  - Total: 200,826 (district)
- Language: Kurdish

Ranya District (Kurdish: قەزای ڕانیە, romanized: Qezay Ranye, Arabic: قضاء رانية) is a district of Sulaymaniyah Governorate, Iraqi Kurdistan, Iraq. Its capital is Ranya. The district has a population of 200,826. The district includes three towns, Çiwarqurne, Bêtwate and Hacî awa, and is the centre of the Bîtwên and Raperîn area. The region of Ranya has been inhabited since ancient times and is rich in archaeologic sites such as Tell Shemshara, Tell Bazmusian, Qalatga Darband, Girdedême, Kameryan and Boskin hills and Ranya castle. Its history as a district dates from the Ottoman Empire period in 1789 when the first district commissioner was appointed. The main tribes in Ranya are the Jaff, Bilbas, Ako and Shawri. The area is well known for its fertile soil. The principle crops are sunflowers, tobacco, rice, wheat and barley.

== See also ==
- Lake Kanaw
