= Jørgen Læssøe =

Danish Assyriologist (1924–1993)

- Born: 2 June 1924; Jægerspris, Denmark
- Died: 2 February 1993 (aged 68)
- Education: University of Copenhagen
- Occupation: Assyriologist
- Notable work: The People of Ancient Assyria (1963)
- Spouse: Herdis Elsie Aaberg (m. 1949–1993)

Signature
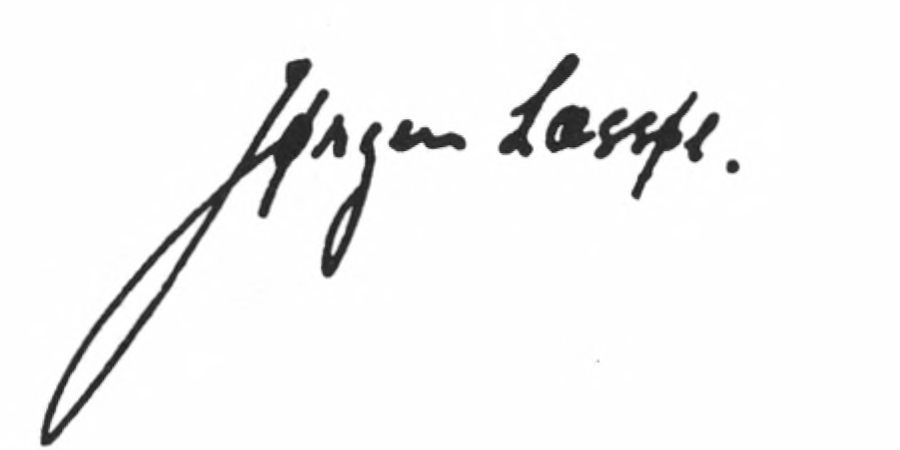

Jørgen Læssøe (2 June 1924 – 2 February 1993) was a Danish Assyriologist and professor at the University of Copenhagen. He directed the Danish excavations at Tell Shemshara, uncovering an Old Assyrian palace complex and a substantial cache of cuneiform texts known as the Shemshara Archives, which became his main object of study. He also worked on inscriptions from Max Mallowan's excavations at Nimrud, served as the field director of the Scandinavian Joint Expedition to Sudanese Nubia, and published a number of popular history books on Assyriology in Danish, including his magnum opus, The People of Ancient Assyria (1963).

Læssøe studied under Otto E. Ravn and succeeded him as Professor Extraordinaire of Assyriology at Copenhagen in 1957. The only Assyriologist active in Denmark at the time of his appointment, the discipline is said to have "come of age" during his thirty-year tenure: his students included Assyriologists Ebbe Egede Knudsen, Aage Westenholz, Mogens Trolle Larsen and Jesper Eidem. Læssøe also worked in the United States, first on the Chicago Assyrian Dictionary (1948–1951) and then as a visiting professor at the University of California, Berkeley (1953–1955 and 1966–1967).

The erudite Laessoe
Omitted to say so
But Texts from the Town
Were getting him down.

At the close of the day
In a fever he lay
And muttered, much vext,
Sundry fragments of Text:

'If a dog bark too oft...(?)
If a Guard spit too soft...
If a cock loudly crows...
(If I stay here – who knows?... (?) (...))

'If there’s ice in the river...
(What’s wrong with my liver?)
If an IPC Chicken!...!...(?!)'
The plot starts to thicken.

His final vexation
Was this kind of equation:
( )=(..... )(?)
E-pig-ra(PH)-ist's (JAR)-gon
Relating (?) to (S)ar-(GON)?

(A kind of Inscription
That beggars description!)
He awoke with a cry
Of: 'My typist must (DIE)!'

To preserve him from Crime
There arrived, just in time,
His four hundreth Letter!
And soon, he felt BETTER.

— Agatha Christie

== Early life ==
Læssøe was born on 2 June 1924, in Jægerspris, Denmark. He was the son of Albert Læssøe and Karen Stroyer Nielsen, and a descendant of Danish officer Frederik Læssøe. In 1928, the family moved to the suburbs of Copenhagen, where his father managed a branch of the department store Magasin du Nord, and Jørgen attended a private school in Farum.

He began studying comparative linguistics at the University of Copenhagen in 1942. Since the curriculum required knowledge of a non-Indo-European language, he took a course in Akkadian taught by Assyriologist Otto E. Ravn, which thereafter became the main focus of his studies. His education was disrupted by the German occupation of Denmark, during which Læssøe was active in the Danish resistance movement. Despite this, he completed his studies and graduated with a magister degree in Semitic philology in 1948. His thesis on the Code of Hammurabi was awarded a gold medal by the university. After graduating, he spent three years in the United States, working on the Chicago Assyrian Dictionary.

== Career ==
In 1951, Læssøe returned to Copenhagen and was appointed a lecturer. He received his doctorate in 1955 with a thesis on the bīt rimki, an Assyrian ritual, and in 1957, succeeded Ravn as Professor Extraordinaire of Assyriology. At the time of his appointment he was the only Assyriologist active in the country, and Danish Assyriology is said to have "come of age" during his tenure. His first magister student was Ebbe Egede Knudsen, later professor of Semitic philology in Oslo, followed by Aage Westenholz and Mogens Trolle Larsen, with both eventually succeeding Læssøe as professors of Assyriology at Copenhagen. He also served as dean of the Faculty of Humanities from 1968 to 1969.

Læssøe was elected a member of the Royal Danish Academy of Sciences and Letters in 1970. He held visiting professors at the University of California, Berkeley twice, first from 1953 to 1955 and then as a Fulbright scholar in 1966–1967.

== Scholarship ==
Between 1956 and 1960, Læssøe worked as the epigrapher on Max Mallowan's excavations at Nimrud, publishing two papers on inscriptions from the reign of Shalmaneser III. During his time there, he became friends with Mallowan and his wife Agatha Christie, who wrote a number of verses about Læssøe and his Danish colleagues, whose names the English team found unpronounceable.

At Nimrud, Læssøe learned of the construction of the Dukan Dam, which was set to flood some forty archaeological sites in the area of what is now Lake Dukan. Securing funding from the Carlsberg Foundation and the Danish government, he and archaeologist Harald Ingholt led the "Danish Dokan Expedition" in a rescue excavation of Tell Shemshara in 1957. The excavations uncovered an Old Assyrian palace complex and substantial cache of cuneiform tablets, which occupied Læssøe for much of the rest of his career. He published a preliminary report on the Shemshara Archives in 1959, and after his death his student Jesper Eidem continued the work, finally publishing the texts in two volumes in 1992 and 2001.

From 1960, Læssøe also worked on the Scandinavian Joint Expedition to Sudanese Nubia, serving as its field director in 1966 and 1967. In the latter part of his career, he authored several popular history books on Assyriology in Danish, including Fra Assyriens arkiver ("From the Archives of Assyria", 1960), Babylon (1966), and Assyriologien i Danmark ("Assyriology in Denmark", 1977). His book The People of Ancient Assyria (1963) is regarded as his magnum opus.

== Personal life and later years ==
Læssøe married Herdis Elsie Aaberg (died 2007), of Dwight, Illinois, in 1949. He retired in 1986 and died on 2 February 1993 after a prolonged bout of illness. Prior to his death, he had been preparing a section on Assyriology for Den Store Danske Encyklopædi.

In an obituary, Læssøe's student Jesper Eidem highlighted his "peculiar devotion" to Assyriology: "Jørgen was a learned scholar of extraordinary intelligence and talent who insisted on the highest standard in his work, but who simultaneously refused to regard his profession as more than a schoolboy hobby in comparison with more pressing human and personal concerns."
