= Dibis Dam =

Dibis (Dibbis) Dam
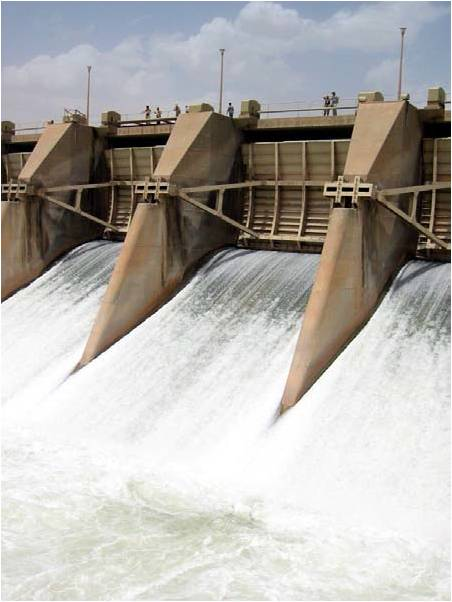

- Location within Iraq
- Location: Kirkuk Governorate, Iraq
- Coordinates: 35°41′19″N 44°06′33″E
- Construction began: 1960
- Opening date: 1965
- Operators: Ministry of Water Resources, U.S. Army Corps of Engineers

Dam and spillways
- Impounds: Lesser Zab River
- Height: 23.75 m (78 ft)
- Length: 376 m (1,234 ft)
- Elevation at crest: 255.75 m (839 ft)
- Width (crest): 8 m (26 ft)
- Spillways: 2
- Spillway capacity: 4,000 m^{3}/s (141,259 cu ft/s)

The Dibis (Dibbis) Dam or Dibis Regulator is a gravel-alluvial fill embankment dam located on the Lesser Zab River approximately 130 km upstream from its confluence with the Tigris River. The dam is located directly north of the town of Dibis in Kirkuk Governorate, Iraq. The main-purpose of the Dibis Dam is to divert water from the Lesser Zab River into the Kirkuk Irrigation Project.

The Dibis Dam was constructed between 1960 and 1965 as part of the larger Kirkuk Irrigation Project for the irrigation of 300,000 ha of land. The dam has a capacity of 4,000 m^{3} through the spillway and 278 m^{3} through the head regulator (diversion to the Kirkuk Irrigation Project). Inflow is from Dokan Dam, approximately 140 km upstream. In 1984 the dam failed due to heavy outflows from the Dokan Dam. The fuse-plug that allows the emergency spillway to work did not erode because heavy sediment had built up behind it. Repairs were carried out by China International Water and Electric Cooperation between October 1985 and March 1987.

== See also ==
- List of dams and reservoirs in Iraq
