= Tell Shemshara =

Archaeological site in Iraq

- Shusharra
- Tell Shimshara
- Location within Iraq
- 36°12′03″N 44°56′18″E
- Type: tell
- Periods: Hassuna, Middle Bronze Age, Islamic
- Location: Iraq
- Region: Sulaymaniyah Governorate

Site notes
- Height: 19 m (62 ft) (main mound), 6 m (20 ft) (lower mound)
- Length: 270 m (890 ft) (lower mound)
- Width: 60 m (200 ft) (main mound)
- Excavation dates: 1957–1959, 2012
- Archaeologists: J. Eidem, H. Ingholt, J. Læssøe, A. al-Qadir at-Tekrîti
- Condition: periodically flooded by Lake Dukan

Tell Shemshāra (ancient Šušarra) (also Tell Shimshara, Tall Šimšārah, and Tall Šamšāra) is an archaeological site located on the right bank of Little Zab in Sulaymaniyah Governorate, in the Iraqi Kurdistan autonomous administrative division of Iraq. The site was inundated by Lake Dukan until recently.

The site was occupied, although not continuously, from the Hassuna period (early sixth millennium BCE) until the 14th century CE. A small archive recovered from the Middle Bronze Age layers (early second millennium BCE) revealed that, at least in that period, the site was called Shusharra and was the capital of a small, semi-independent Turukkean polity called māt Utêm or "land of the gatekeeper" ruled by a man called Kuwari acting as governor under a larger Hurrian state.

== Archaeology ==
The site of Tell Shemshāra consists of four adjacent natural hills:

- Main Hill (SH 1), excavated in 1950s by Danish and Iraqi teams
- Camp Hill (SH 2), oval, northwest of Main Hill, Iraqi team found Mitanni remains and a small Islamic cemetery
- North Hill A (SH 3), north of Main Hill, extensive Islamic cemetery on southern slope
- North Hill B (SH 4), north of North Hill A, 1st millennium BC graves which are heavily robbed out

The site was first recorded in 1955 during an archaeological survey of the Ranya Plain, which was to be flooded by the reservoir of the planned Dukan Dam. In 1957, a Danish team of archaeologists started a rescue excavation because the site would be flooded by Lake Dukan once the Dukan Dam would be finished. The Danish excavation was directed by Professors Harold Ingholt, who also excavated the citadel mound of Hama, and Jørgen Læssøe. It was funded by the Carlsberg Foundation and the Danish Government Foundation for the Promotion of Research. About 146 cuneiform tablets were found, mostly letters and most in one location, believed to have been stored in a pot on excavation level V. The excavations were continued in 1958 and 1959 by Iraqi archaeologists of the State Board of Antiquities and Heritage (SBAH) under the direction of Abd al-Qadir at-Tekrîti. The work was never published but about 103 cuneiform tablets (45 well preserved and the rest in poor condition) tablets were found during the 1958 excavations in rooms near the findspot of the earlier tablets but in loose soil above excavation level V. They are all administrative texts. The excavations have revealed that the site was occupied at least from the Hassuna period onward and the latest occupation phase dates to the 12th–14th centuries CE. The objects found during the Danish excavation were divided between the National Museum of Iraq and the National Museum of Denmark. So far, the prehistoric material of the Hassuna layers and the majority of the archives from the second millennium BCE have been published. These excavations, which focused on the now degrade central main mound defined 3 periods with 16 layers:

- Medieval (Islamic, Levels I–III)
- Middle Bronze (“Hurrian”, levels/layers 4–8)
- Neolithic (Hassuna, levels/layers 9–16)

Beginning in 2012, teams of the Netherlands Institute for the Near East and the Central Zagros Archaeological Project (CZAP) conducted new investigations at the site, as part of a larger archaeological project focusing on the entire Ranya Plain. Finds included terracotta molds for metal objects and two cuneiform tablets. The tablets, administrative in nature, were found on Level VIIIa and Level VIIIb, dating them to before the previously excavated archive. High water prevented work in 2016-2017 but in October 2018 low levels allowed a short season of work. At the same time the University of Reading has focused on prehistoric periods at the site. A further season of excavation was conducted in 2021 focusing lower on the main mound. They found substantial construction on layers they designated Levels IX to VII which includes "a system of massive walls for defense of Main Hill". This work pushed back the date of occupation in this period to at least the 22nd century BC.

== The site and its environment ==
Tell Shemshara sits along the Little Zab, a tributary of the Tigris. Its strategic location in the northeastern corner of the Ranya Plain in the Zagros Mountains gave Shemshara control over travelling routes in all directions, particularly toward the north and east. Shemshara is a tell, or settlement mound, that can be divided in two parts; a high main mound and an elongated lower mound to the south. The main mound is about 75 meters wide at the bottom and about 25 meters wide at the top, whereas the lower town is 265 metres (869 ft) long and 13 metres (43 ft) high. Shemshara is now partially submerged under Lake Dukan. It has lost 164,000 cubic meters of volume to erosion since 1957 and at high water levels becomes an island.

== Occupation history ==
The excavations at the main mound revealed 16 occupation layers, ranging in date from the Hassuna period (early sixth millennium BCE) to the 14th century CE. A single radiocarbon sample from the basal level of the site, 3m below level 16, provided a date of 7322–7180 BC (IntCal13).

=== Hassuna Period ===
Layers 16–9 on the northeast flan of Main Hill dated to the Hassuna period. This occupation was characterized by rows of stones that are interpreted by the excavators as foundations for mudbrick walls, a pebble floor and a clay basin in the final occupation layer. Pottery, which has only been found in abundance in layers 13–9, shows stylistic links with that of Hassuna and Tell es-Sawwan. Obsidian was the preferred material for stone tools, with flint making up only 15 percent of the total assemblage. Whereas the flint was procured locally, the obsidian was obtained from two sources in eastern Turkey – one as yet unidentified, the other one being the volcanic Nemrut Dağ more than 300 kilometres (190 mi) away from Shemshara. A unique piece in this assemblage is a dagger of over 35.5 centimetres (14.0 in) in length, broken in four pieces due to a fire. Other artifacts that have been found at the site include stone bowls, bracelets and quern-stones and small objects made of bone.

=== Uruk and Jemdet Nasr Period ===
Whereas the main mound seems to have been abandoned after the Hassuna occupation, scarce archaeological material from the Uruk (fourth millennium BCE) and Jemdet Nasr periods (early third millennium BCE) has been found on the lower town.

=== Middle Bronze Age ===
Both the Main Hill and the lower extension were re-occupied during the Middle Bronze Age (early second millennium BCE). Layers 8–4 on the main mound can be assigned to this period, mainly Hurrian in nature. The excavations found a number of graves with bronze weapons on the main mound, as well as a mudbrick platform. In the lower town, a small part of a palace was excavated, and in three of its rooms a small archive of clay tablets was found. The palace was destroyed by fire, and through analysis of the archive it has been proposed that this happened in year 30 of the reign of Shamshi-Adad I of Ekallatum in the first quarter of the 18th century BCE.

The archive consisted of circa 250 clay tablets or fragments thereof, found in two groups in Level 5. The first group, called Archive 1 by the editor, comprises circa 146 documents, of which 100 are letters written to Kuwari, and 39 are administrative. Some fragments were part of the clay envelopes in which these letters were sent. The second group, called Archive 2, comprises circa 104 documents almost all of administrative character. The texts were written in Akkadian. These texts revealed that during this period the site was called Šušarrā (also known from texts at Mari, that it was the capital of a polity called māt Utêm or "land of the gatekeeper" and that it was ruled by a man named Kuwari. Chronologically, the archive can be divided in two parts, one covering the period during which Shemshara was the capital of a small semi-independent kingdom, and one covering the period after Kuwari decided to become a vassal of Shamshi-Adad I (who then established a garrison at Shemshara), who at that time had already conquered Mari and Shubat-Enlil and was now campaigning in the Zagros Mountains. Together, these two periods do not last longer than 3 years. The letters in the Shemshara archive show that during this period, Kuwari had to deal with Turukkean refugees coming from the east and fleeing a war with Guteans (led by their leader Endusse); events which are also mentioned in the much larger archives found in Mari on the Syrian Euphrates.

Shamshi-Adad I tried, in a treaty, to give Šušarrā to another power as bride price for his daughter:

"I want to make a golden statue of you and of me, where the one is holding the neck of the other tightly. I want to give you my daughter and as a bride-price I want to give you the land of Šušarra"

The city of Šušarrā being too much trouble to protect Shamshi-Adad I then deported the entire populace to Arrapha and Qabrâ.

=== Islamic Period ===
Layers 1-3 were Islamic.

== Šašrum ==
It is generally thought that Tell Shemshara was the location of the city of Šašrum (Ša-aš-zar^{ki}-šè) in the 3rd millennium. This identification has been disputed. It is first mentioned during the reign of Šulgi, 2nd ruler of the Ur III Empire with his 42nd year name being "Year: The king destroyed Šašrum" (mu lugal-e ša-aš-ru-umki mu-hul) referring to his campaign in the Lower Zab river region against cities like Urbilum. In his 6th year name "Amar-Suen, the king, destroyed Šašrum for the second time and Šurudhum" (mu ^{d}amar-^{d}suen lugal-e ša-aš-ru-um^{ki} a-ra2 2(diš)-kam u3 šu-ru-ud-hu-um^{ki} mu-hul) the 3rd ruler of Ur III, Amar-Sin, reports again destroying Šašrum. An accounting text from that time reports "1 mina of silver rings (as) a gift (to) Lugal-andul who brought the good news that Šašrum was ‘ruined’". A text from that year records "part of the delivery of the booty of Šašru and Suruthum".

== See also ==
- Cities of the ancient Near East
- Tell Bazmusian
- Bestansur
- Lake Kanaw
