= Little Zab =

Assyrian Little Zab Kurdish: Zêy Koya or Zêyê Biçûk, Arabic: الزاب الاسفل: al-Zāb al-Asfal, Persian: زاب کوچک: Zâb-e Kuchak, Syriac: ܙܒܐ ܬܚܬܝܐ: Zāba taḥtāya, Byzantine Greek: μικρω Ζβαω, Classical Greek: Κάπρος, Akkadian: Zabū šupalū
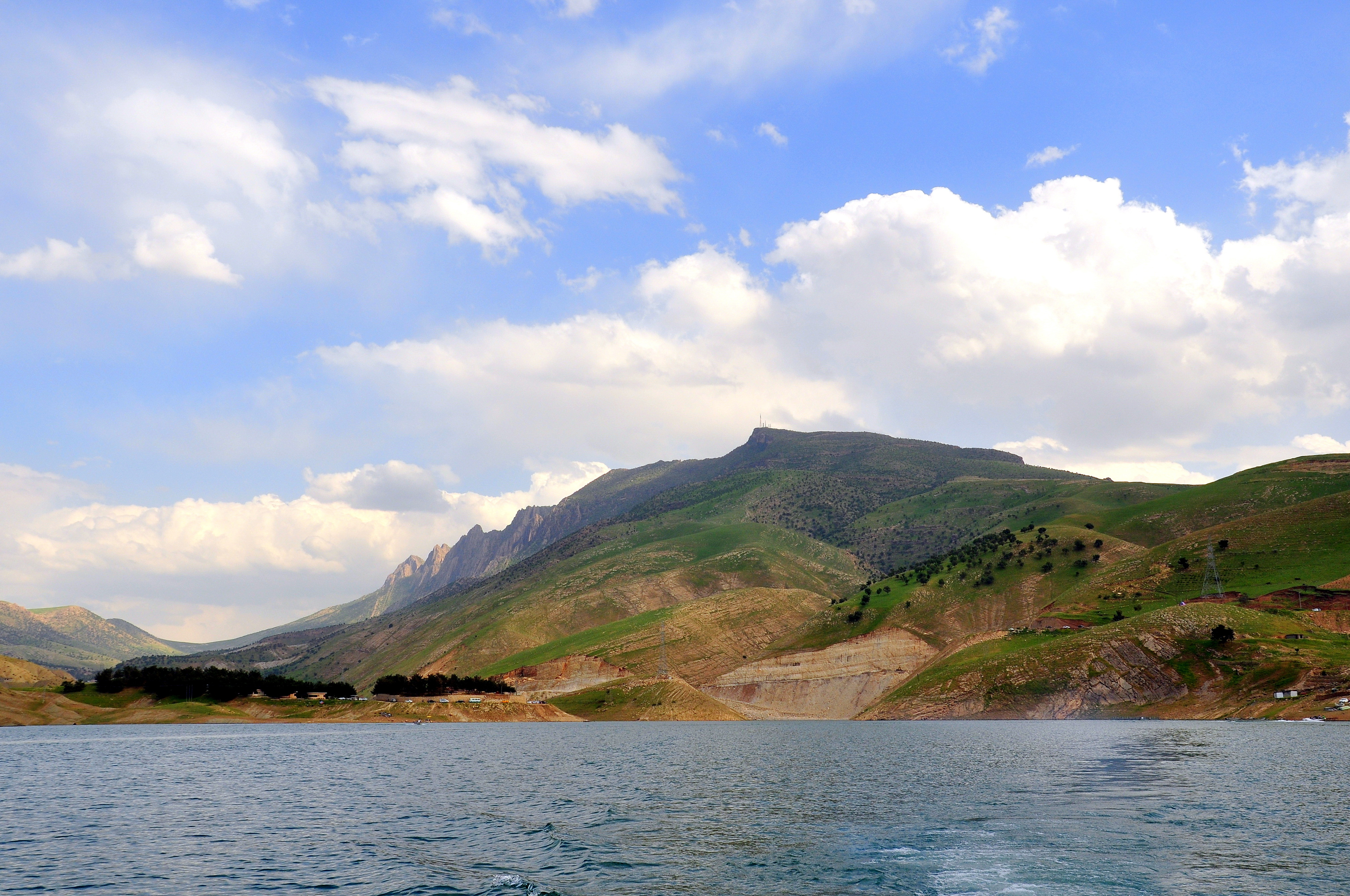
- View of Lake Dukan, a reservoir on the Little Zab created by the Dukan Dam in Suleymaniyah, Iraq

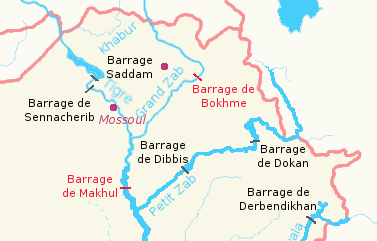
- French map showing the Little Zab (Petit Zab) and the locations of the Dukan Dam and the Dibis Dam

Location
- Country: Iran, Iraq

Physical characteristics
- Source
  - location: Zagros Mountains, Iran
  - elevation: 3,000 m (9,800 ft)approx.
- Mouth
  - location: Tigris, Kirkuk Governorate, Iraq
  - coordinates: 35°14′17″N 43°26′11″E
- Length: 400 km (250 mi)approx.
- Basin size: 22,000 km^{2} (8,500 sq mi)approx.
- Discharge
  - average: 197.8 m^{3}/s (6,990 cu ft/s)
  - maximum: 3,420 m^{3}/s (121,000 cu ft/s)

Basin features
- Tributaries
  - left: Baneh, Qala Chulan, Rubar-i-Basalam

The Little Zab or Lower Zab (Arabic: الزاب الاسفل, al-Zāb al-Asfal; Kurdish: Zêy Koya or Zêyê Biçûk; Persian: زاب کوچک, Zâb-e Kuchak; Syriac: ܙܒܐ ܬܚܬܝܐ, Zāba Taḥtāya) is a river that originates in Iran and joins the Tigris just south of Al Zab in Iraq. The Little Zab is approximately 400 kilometres (250 mi) long and drains an area of about 22,000 square kilometres (8,500 sq mi). The river is fed by rainfall and snowmelt, resulting in a peak discharge in the spring and low water in the summer and early fall. Two dams built on the Little Zab regulate the river flow, providing water for irrigation and generating hydroelectricity.

The Zagros Mountains have been populated since at least the Lower Palaeolithic, but the earliest archaeological site in the Little Zab basin, Barda Balka, dates to the Middle Palaeolithic. Human occupation of the Little Zab basin has been attested for every period since then.

== Course ==
The Little Zab rises in the Mountains in Iraq at an elevation of circa 3,000 metres (9,800 ft) amsl. In its upper reaches, the course of the Little Zab is determined by the alignment of the major mountain chains that make up the Zagros. Thus, the river flows through valleys that are predominantly aligned along a northwest–southeast axis, parallel to the major mountain chains of the Zagros, only to change its direction abruptly where it cuts through these chains in narrow gorges. Along the way, it collects the waters coming down from the eastern face of the Qandil Mountains, which now form the border between Iran and Iraq. The Little Zab enters the Mesopotamian plain south of Dukan, where it first assumes a roughly westward course before turning to the southwest upstream from the town of Altun Kupri and uniting with the Tigris near the town of Al Zab. Most tributaries join the Little Zab upstream from Dukan, with the largest being the Baneh River and the Qala Chulan. A number of smaller streams joined the Little Zab in the Ranya Plain, which is now partly inundated by Lake Dukan.

Different estimates have been given for the length of the Little Zab: 380 kilometres (240 mi), 400 kilometres (250 mi) and 456 kilometres (283 mi). For a short distance, the Little Zab forms the border between Iran and Iraq, and along its lower course it also constitutes the border between Erbil Governorate and Sulaymaniyah Governorate, and Erbil and Kirkuk Governorates. The river is fed by snowmelt and rainfall, resulting in a peak discharge in the period February–May. Low water levels are recorded for the period July–October. The average discharge of the Little Zab is 197.8 cubic metres (6,990 cu ft) per second, whereas the maximum recorded discharge is 3,420 cubic metres (121,000 cu ft) per second. Average annual discharge is 7.2 cubic kilometres (1.7 cu mi). Because of its torrential nature, Medieval Arab geographers have described the Little Zab, and the Great Zab as well, as "demoniacally possessed".

== Watershed ==
The drainage basin of the Little Zab covers 21,475–22,250 square kilometres (8,292–8,591 sq mi); from the location where the Dukan Dam has been constructed, it measures 11,700 square kilometres (4,500 sq mi). The larger part of the basin (74%) is located within Iraqi borders; the remainder is in Iran. On the north, it is bordered by the Great Zab basin while on the south it is adjoined by the basins of the Adhaim and Diyala rivers. The parallel mountain ranges of the Zagros consist of limestone folds rising to elevations over 3,000 metres (9,800 ft). Water erosion has filled the Little Zab valley and the foothill zone south-west of the Zagros with layers of gravel, conglomerate, and sandstone. The Ranya Plain is the largest valley in the Little Zab drainage basin, and the second-largest in the Iraqi Zagros behind the Shahrazor.

The Little Zab crosses very diverse climatic and ecological zones. Annual precipitation along the course of the river diminishes from over 1,000 millimetres (39 in) in the Iranian Zagros to less than 200 millimetres (7.9 in) at the confluence with the Tigris near Al Zab. Average temperatures follow a similar gradient, with the mountain valleys generally experiencing colder winters than the foothill zone, while summers in the latter are hotter. In the high Zagros, three different biomes can be distinguished. The tree line is at approximately 1,800 metres (5,900 ft); above which herbs and shrubs predominate. The dominant vegetation between 1,800 and 610 metres (5,910 and 2,000 ft) was an open oak forest (Quercus aegilops), but not much of this original vegetation remains. The river valleys are characterized by water-loving plants, and marshy areas were in the past – in the absence of drainage – prone to malaria. Although the foothill zone, especially the plain of Erbil, is heavily cultivated, patches of natural vegetation remain, with herbs in the genus Phlomis being very common.

== River modifications ==
Two dams have been constructed on the Little Zab in Iraq while Iran is currently constructing one with two others planned. The two in Iraq are the Dukan Dam and the Dibis Dam. The Dukan Dam was constructed between 1957 and 1961 as a multi-purpose arch dam upstream from the town of Dukan. The dam's crest is 116 metres (381 ft) above the riverbed (516 metres (1,693 ft) amsl) and 360 metres (1,180 ft) long. Its functions are to regulate the flow of the Little Zab, to store water for irrigation in its reservoir (Lake Dukan) and to provide hydroelectric power. The maximum storage capacity of the dam's reservoir is 6.97 cubic kilometres (1.67 cu mi). Because the flooding of Lake Dukan would lead to the submersion of numerous archaeological sites, an archaeological survey and rescue excavations were carried out in the endangered region – notably at the sites of Tell Shemshara and Tell Bazmusian. The Dibis Dam is located approximately 130 kilometres (81 mi) upstream from the confluence with the Tigris and was constructed between 1960 and 1965. The embankment dam is 376 metres (1,234 ft) long and 23.75 metres (77.9 ft) wide and provides water for the Kirkuk Irrigation Project. Currently under construction in Iran is the Sardasht Dam. Construction began in 2011 and when complete, the 116 m (381 ft) tall embankment dam will support a 120 MW power station. Above the Sardasht Dam, Iran is planning to construct the Shivahan and Garjhal Dams with the primary purpose of power generation.

Iran has diverted as much as 600,000,000 cubic metres (2.1×10^{10} cu ft) of its water in efforts to restore Lake Urmia. This competes with need for the water in Kurdistan Region in Iraq.

== History ==
Although Iraqi Kurdistan is not well known from an archaeological point of view, the available evidence nevertheless shows that the relatively favourable ecological conditions of the Iraqi part of the Zagros attracted human groups from early prehistory onwards. Lower Palaeolithic archaeological sites have to date not been found in the Iraqi part of the Zagros Mountains, but they are known from the Iranian side where numerous cave sites have been found during archaeological surveys. Information on the early prehistory of the wider Little Zab region itself comes from the excavations carried out by the Oriental Institute at archaeological sites east of Kirkuk and south of the Little Zab. The earliest evidence for human occupation in this region comes from the Middle Palaeolithic site of Barda Balka, where Late Acheulean stone tools have been found. Archaeological research elsewhere in the Zagros confirms the importance of this area to early human hunter-gatherers – including groups of Neanderthals as evidenced by the finds in Shanidar Cave in the Great Zab basin. Mousterian stone tools that were used by either Neanderthals or anatomically modern humans have recently been excavated in Erbil, between the Little Zab and the Great Zab. Both open-air and cave sites are attested for the Zarzian culture, which straddles the Upper and Epipalaeolithic periods. After the Zarzian, the focus of human occupation shifted from cave-sites, which continue to be used as secondary or seasonal occupation sites up to today, to open-air sites and it was in this period that the trend toward domestication of plants and animals set in. Domestication of the goat probably occurred first in this area of the Zagros. Jarmo, a tell east of Kirkuk, was a Neolithic village community that practiced agriculture and animal husbandry. Pottery occurs from the early occupation levels onward; in its later phases it resembles pottery from Hassuna. The early occupation of Tell Shemshara, in the Ranya Plain, can also be dated to this period. The archaeological fieldwork in the Ranya Plain showed that this area was occupied during the Ubaid, Uruk and Ninevite V periods – roughly from the middle 6th to the mid-3rd millennium BCE. Evidence for these periods comes from the Citadel of Erbil as well.

The region enters history at the end of the 3rd millennium BCE, when Erbil is mentioned as Urbilum by king Shulgi of the Ur III dynasty. From that time onward, the Little Zab basin became increasingly entangled in the affairs of the successive Mesopotamian empires that sought control over the Zagros Mountains. In the early second millennium BCE, king Shamshi-Adad of Upper Mesopotamia waged war to the land of Qabra, which was probably located along the lower course of the Little Zab, and installed garrisons in the conquered towns. The archive of clay tablets found at Tell Shemshara (ancient Shusharra) shows that the local governor switched allegiance and became a vassal of Shamshi-Adad. During the 14th century BCE, the region was part of the Mitannian kingdom, with sites like Nuzi and Tell al-Fakhar, south of the Little Zab, yielding clay tablet archives for this period. During the late second–early first millennia BCE, the lower Little Zab basin belonged to the heartland of the Middle Assyrian and Neo-Assyrian empires. After the fall of the Neo-Assyrian Empire, control of the Zagros shifted first to the Medes and in 550 BCE to the Achaemenid Empire. The last Achaemenid ruler Darius III was defeated by Alexander the Great at the Battle of Gaugamela in northern Iraq and after Alexander's death in 323, the area fell to his Seleucid successors.

On the Ortelius Theatrum Orbis Terrarum maps of Turkish Empire and Persian Kingdom it is listed as Noue aque fl.

== See also ==
- Great Zab
- Tigris–Euphrates river system
