= Qalatga Darband =

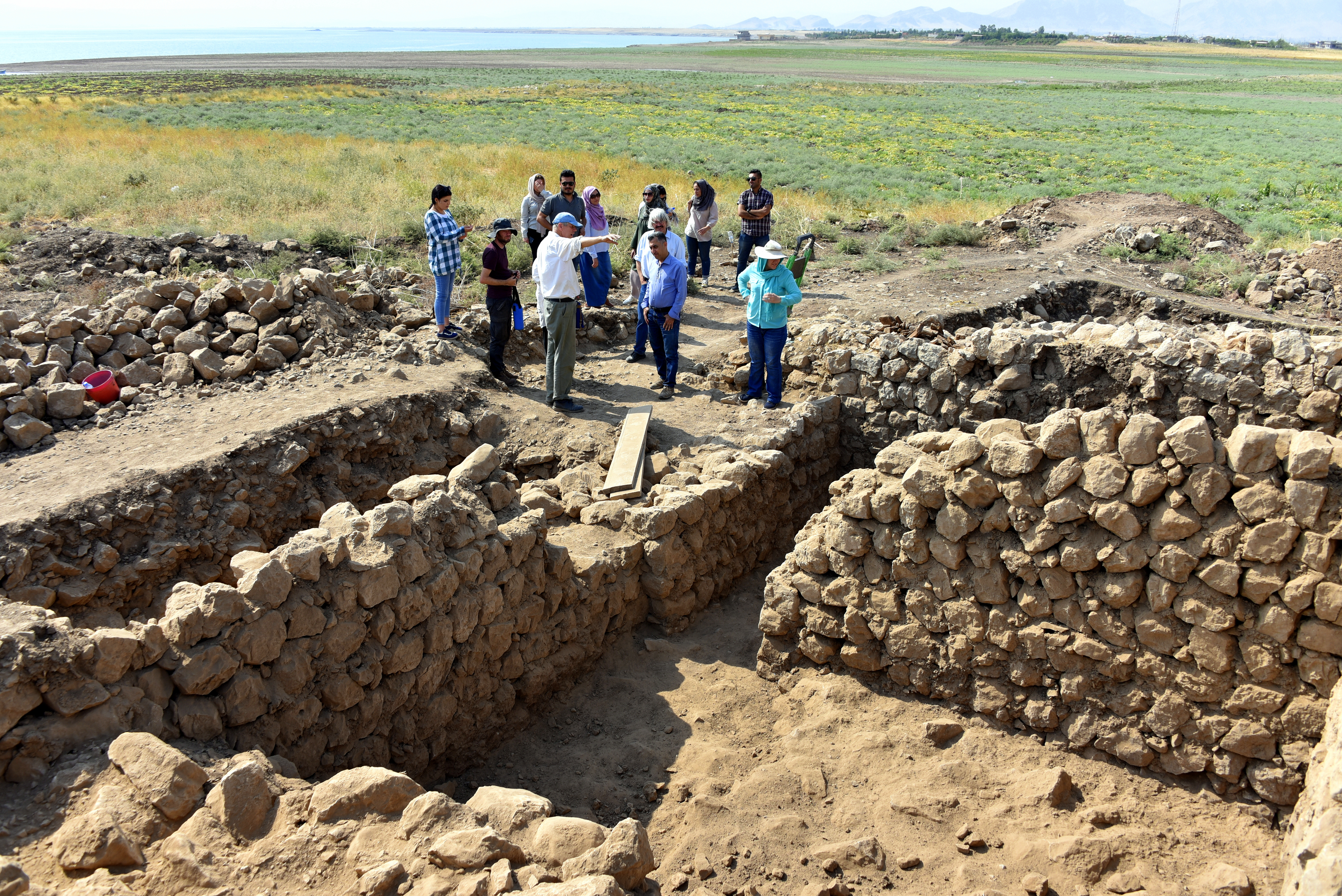
- Qalatga Darband, Lake Dukan appears in the background, September 26, 2019

- Location within Iraq Location within Near East
- 36°12′48.6″N 44°58′38.28″E
- Type: archaeological site
- Location: Sulaymaniyah Governorate, Iraq
- Region: Mesopotamia

Qalatga Darband is an ancient city located in Iraqi Kurdistan, overlooking Lake Dukan in Sulaymaniyah Governorate. It has been dated to the Late Hellenistic period or to the transition of Hellinistic-Parthian period.

The site was first discovered using satellite imagery declassified in the 1990s that had been taken as part of the Corona program in the 1960s. It was one of the sites to be surveyed in the region in 2013 by a French mission directed by Jessica Giraud. In 2016, the British Museum chose the site to excavate and train the Iraqi archaeologists on archaeology and sites protection, a program supported by the British government.

== Gallery ==
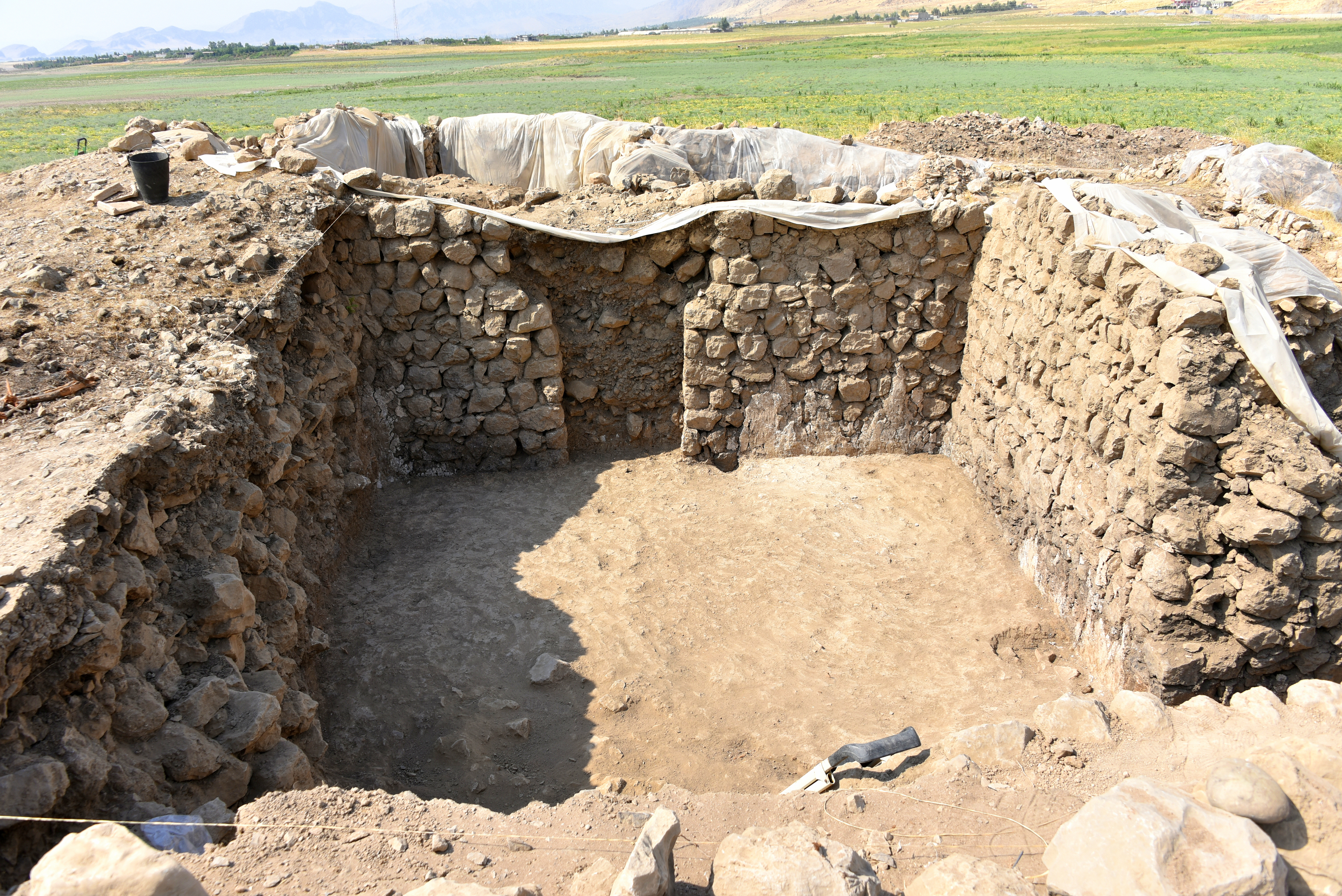
Parthian building at Qalatga Darband, September 26, 2019

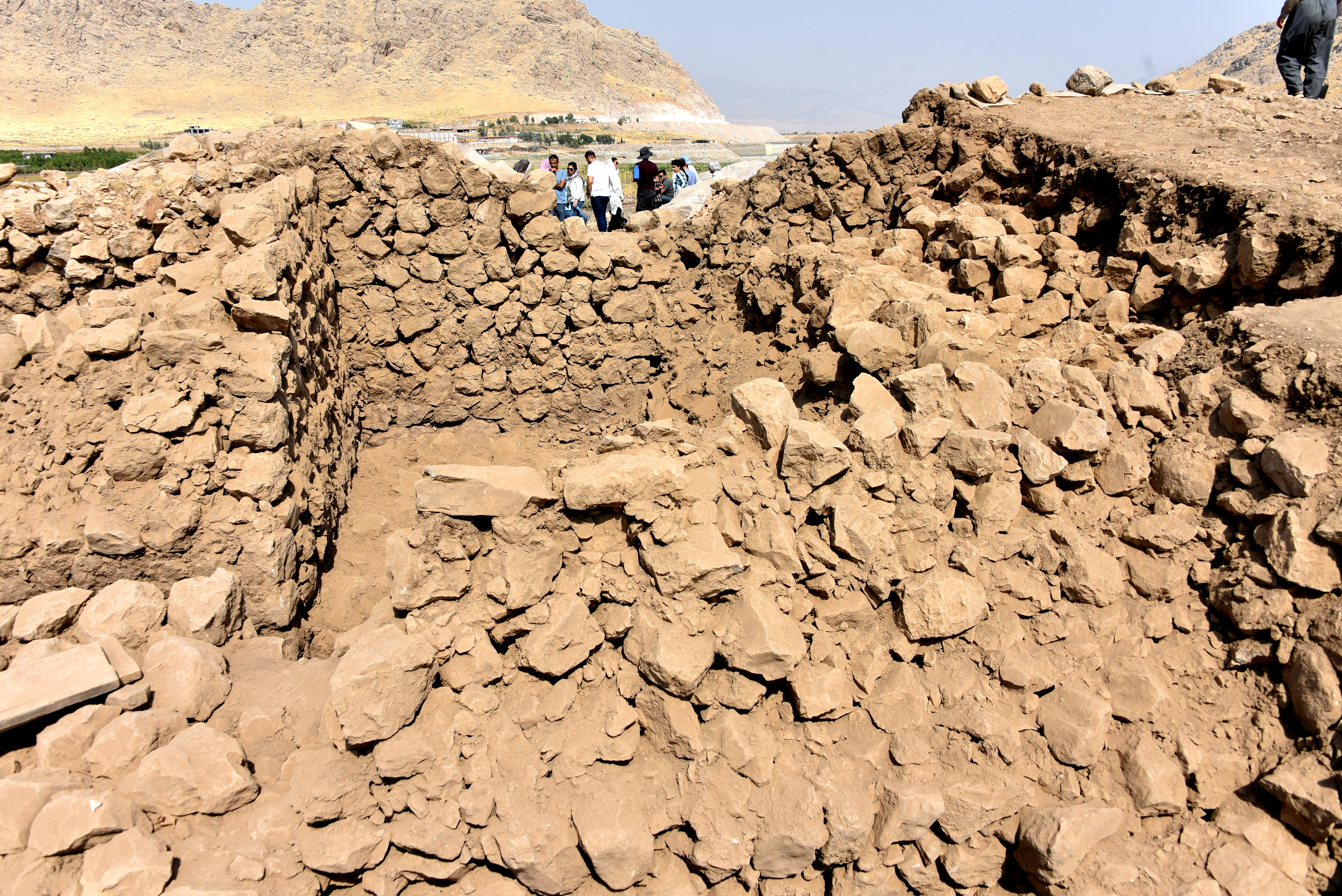
Parthian building at Qalatga Darband, September 26, 2019

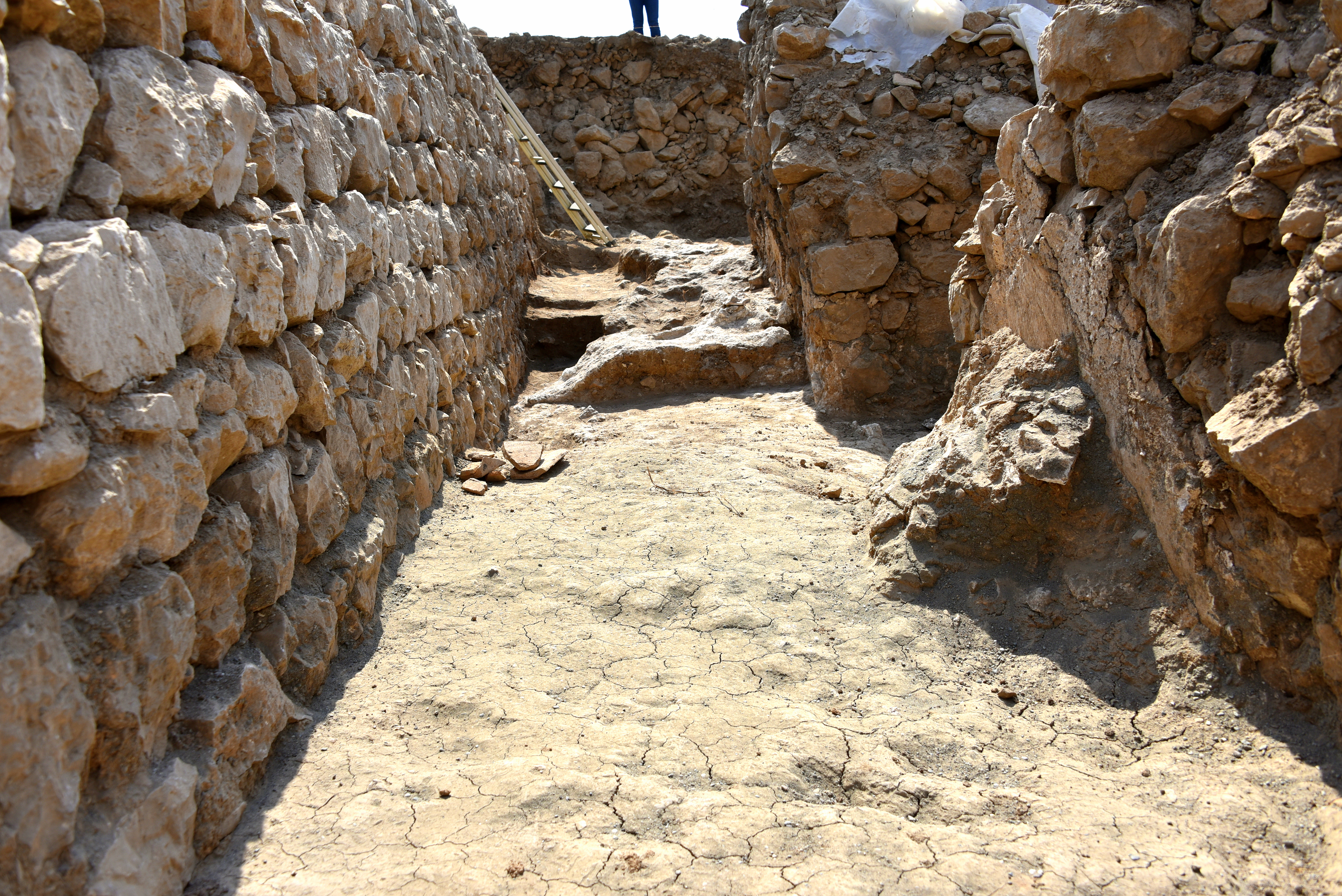
Parthian building at Qalatga Darband, September 26, 2019

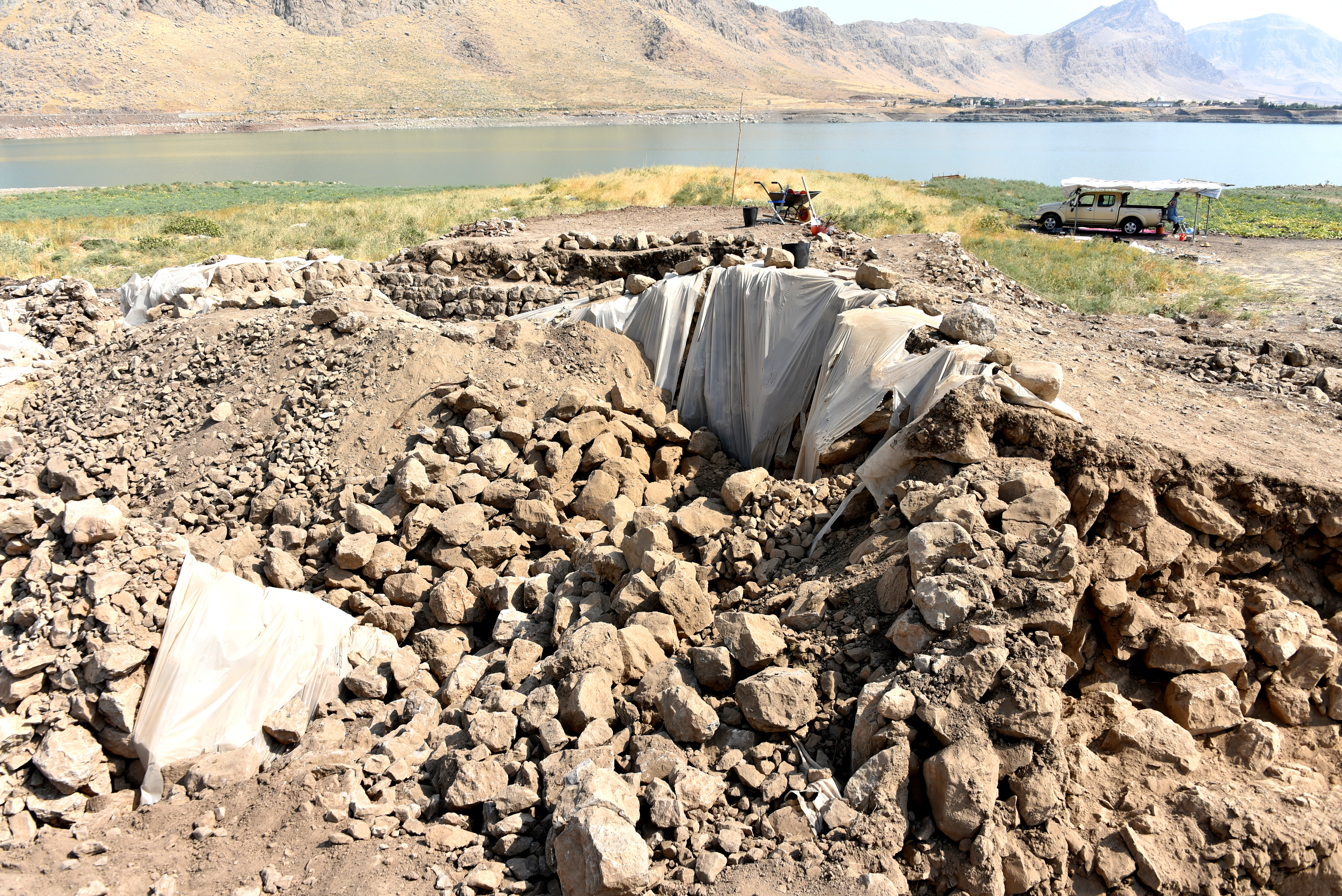
Excavations unearthing a Parthian building at Qalatga Darband, September 26, 2019
