= Barda Balka =

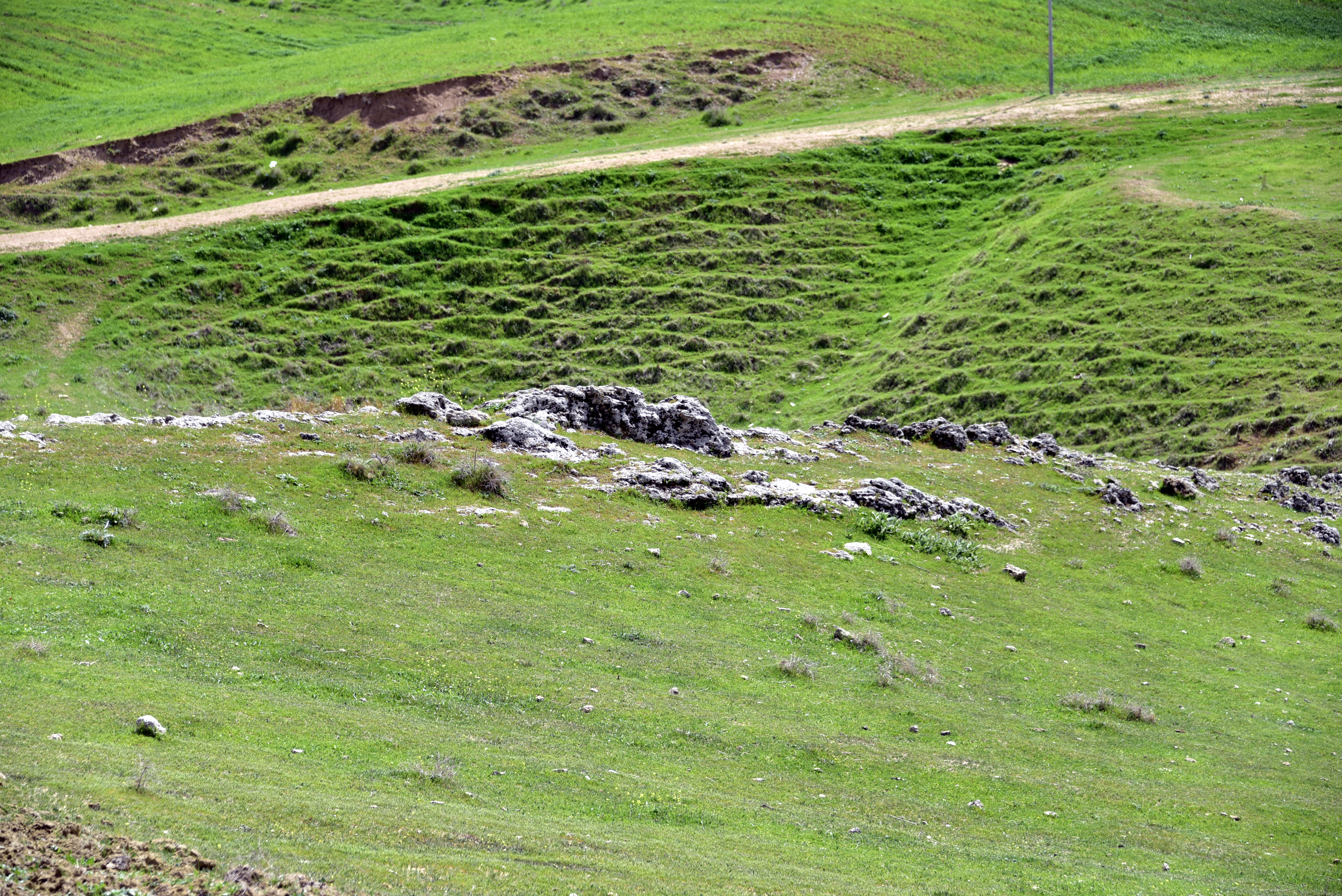
- Barda Balka, March 2021. The 4-meter high megalith was deliberately demolished and its fragments are scattered on the site
- Interactive map of Barda Balka
- Type: Surface site
- Periods: Middle Paleolithic, Neolithic
- Cultures: Late Acheulean
- Location: Iraq, Iraqi Kurdistan

Site notes
- Material: gravels
- Excavation dates: 1951
- Archaeologists: Bruce Howe and Herbert E. Wright

Barda Balka is an archeological site near the Little Zab and Chamchamal in the Iraqi Kurdistan, north of modern-day Iraq.

The site was discovered on a hilltop in 1949 by Sayid Fuad Safar and Naji al-Asil from the Directorate General of Antiquities, Iraq. It was later excavated by Bruce Howe and Herbert E. Wright in 1951. Stone tools were found amongst a particular layer of Pleistocene gravels that dated to the late Acheulean period. The tools included pebble tools, bifaces and lithic flakes that were suggested to be amongst the oldest evidence of human occupation in Iraq. They were found comparable with tools known to have been made around eighty thousand years ago.

Similar material was found in other locations around the Chemchemal valley.

A Neolithic megalith is also located at the center of the site around which the tools were found.

Barada Balka is where hominids hunted wild cattle, sheep, goats, and equids and ate shells and turtles some 100–150,000 years ago. This site is of special note in that it provides the only evidence in Mesopotamian prehistory for the hunting or scavenging of Indian elephants and rhinoceros. (1) Roger Matthews

== Gallery ==
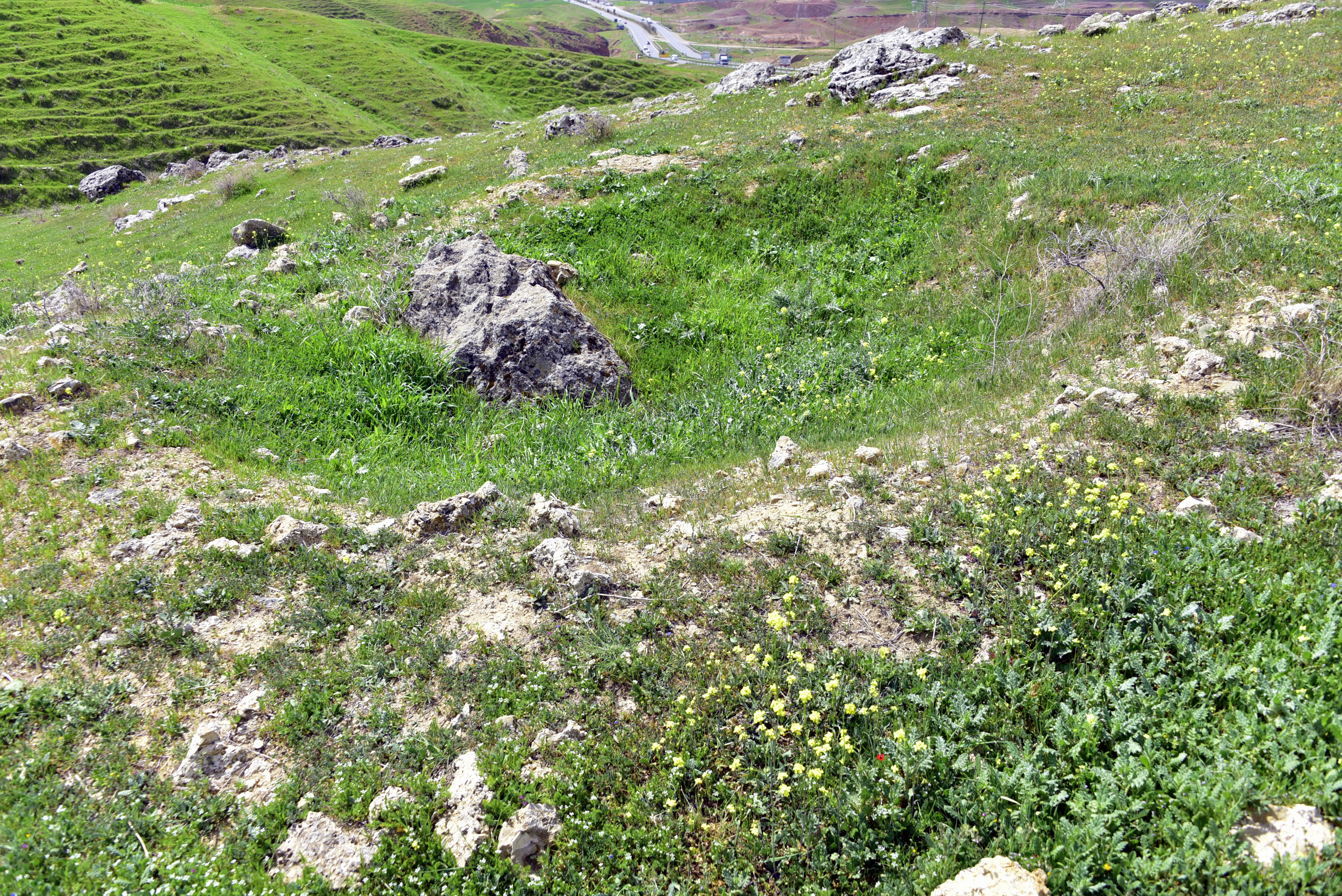
Barda Baka in March 2021

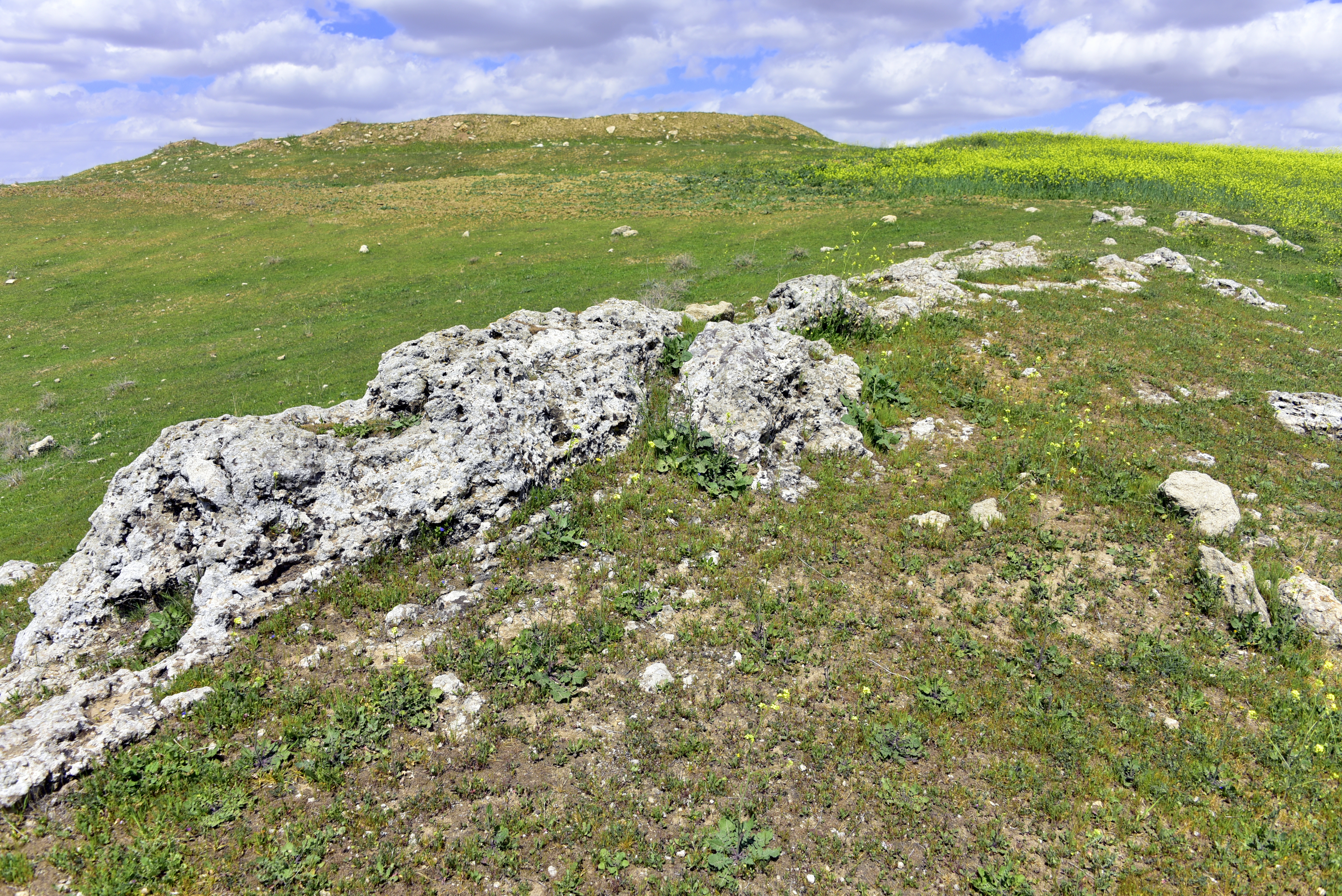
Barda Balka, the large megalith once stood here was demolished

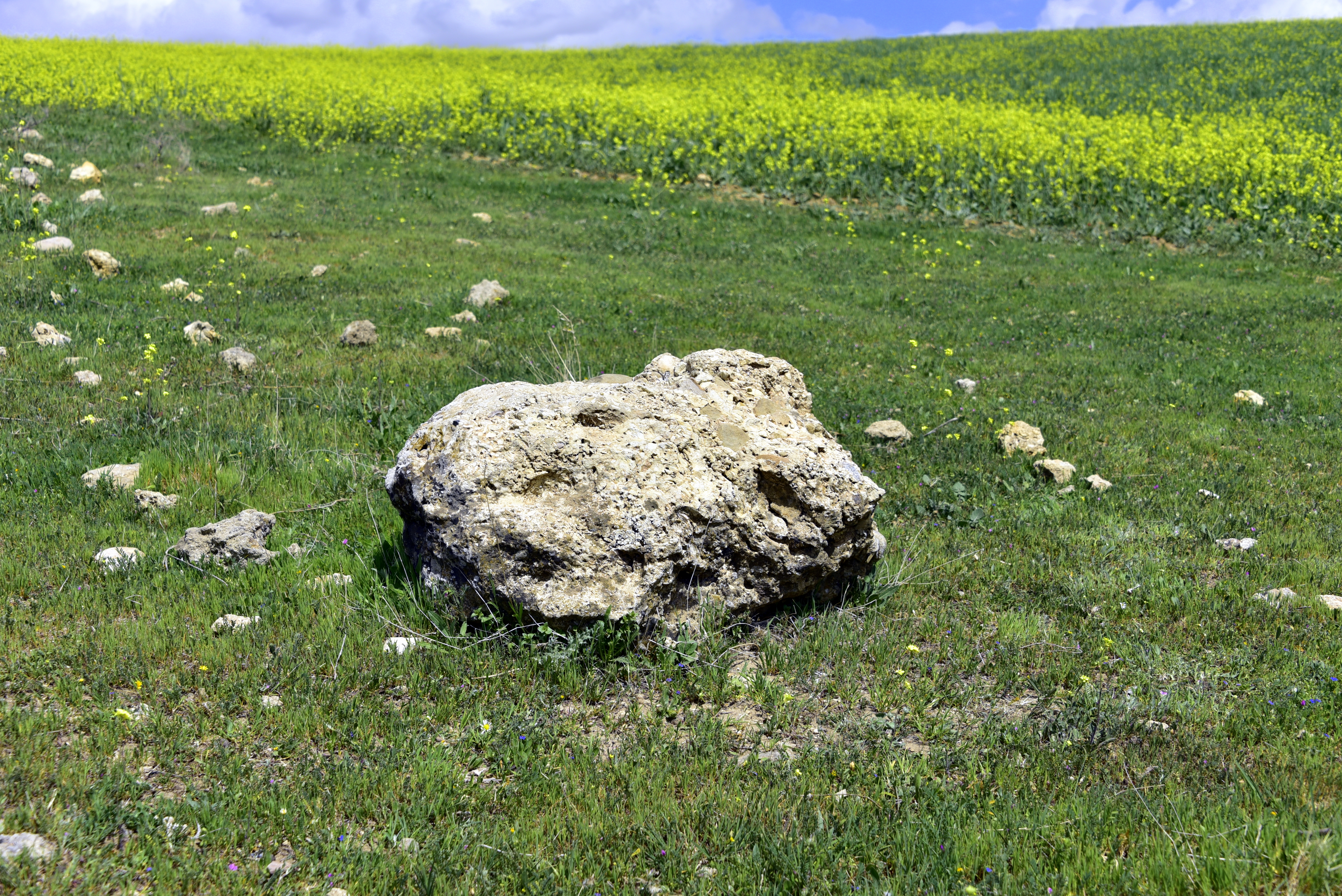
A fragment from the megalith of Barda Balka, in situ

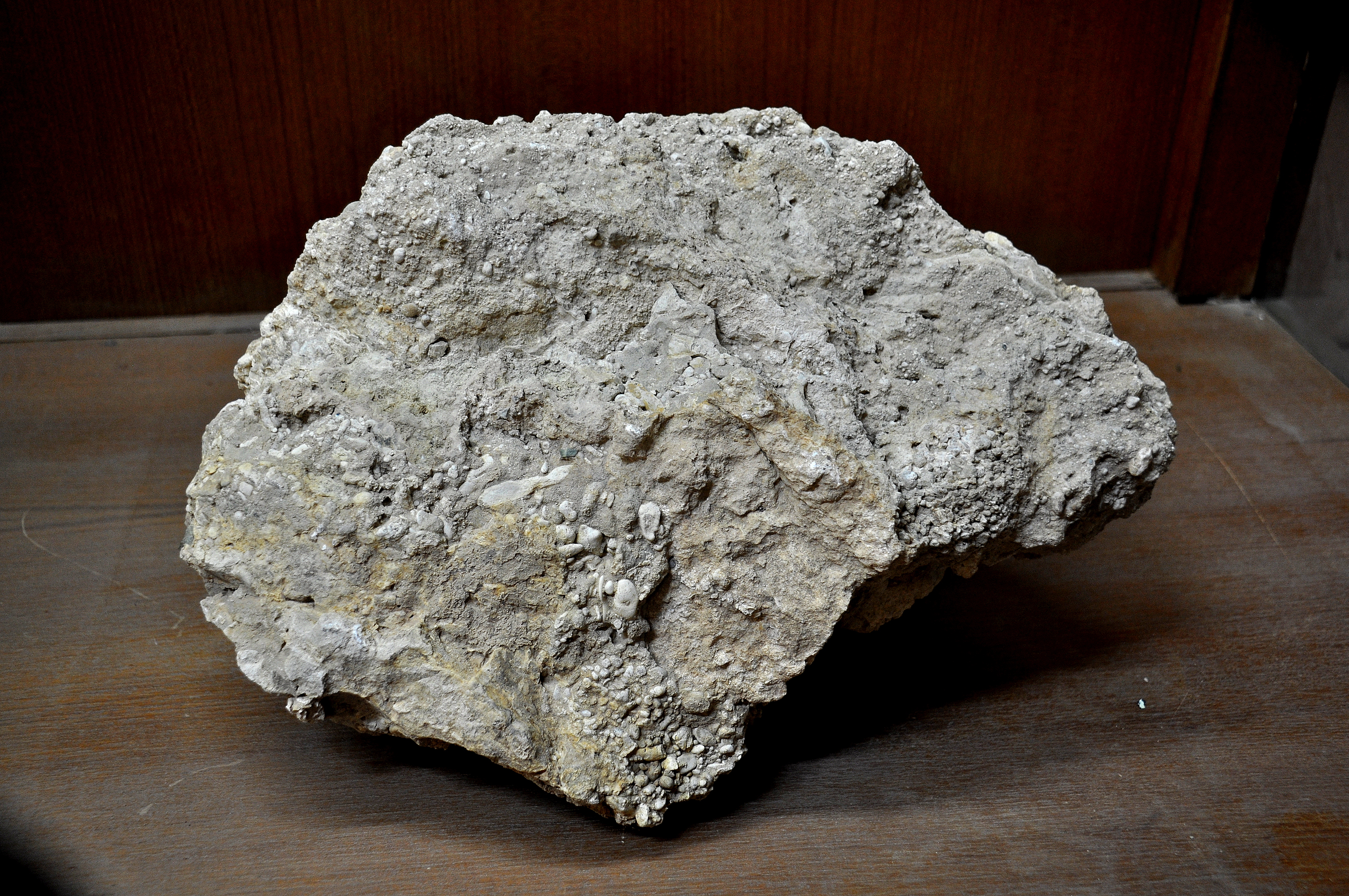
A fragment from the megalith of Barda Balka at the Sulaymaniyah Museum, Iraq

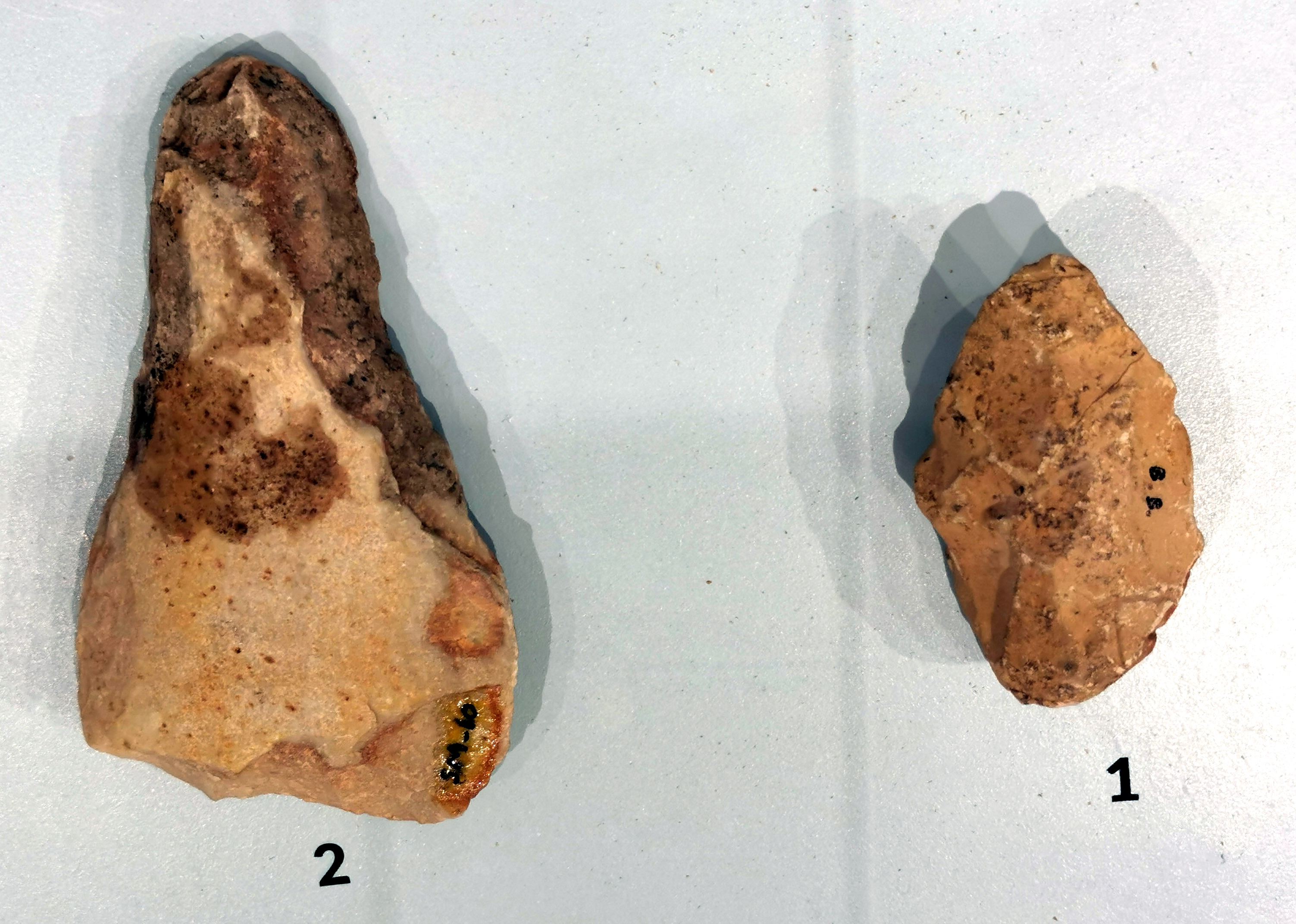
Hand-axes from Barda Balka, Acheulean period, c. 250,000 years ago. Sulaymaniyah Museum, Iraq
