= Tell Bazmusian =

Archaeological site in Iraq

- Location within Iraq Location within Near East
- 36°09′42″N 44°55′27″E
- Type: tell
- Periods: Samarra culture, Uruk period, Middle Assyrian Empire, Abbasid Caliphate, Halaf culture
- Location: Sulaymaniyah Governorate, Iraq

Site notes
- Height: 23 metre
- Circumference: 1,500 metre
- Excavation dates: 1956-1958
- Archaeologists: Abu al-Soof, A. al-Tikriti

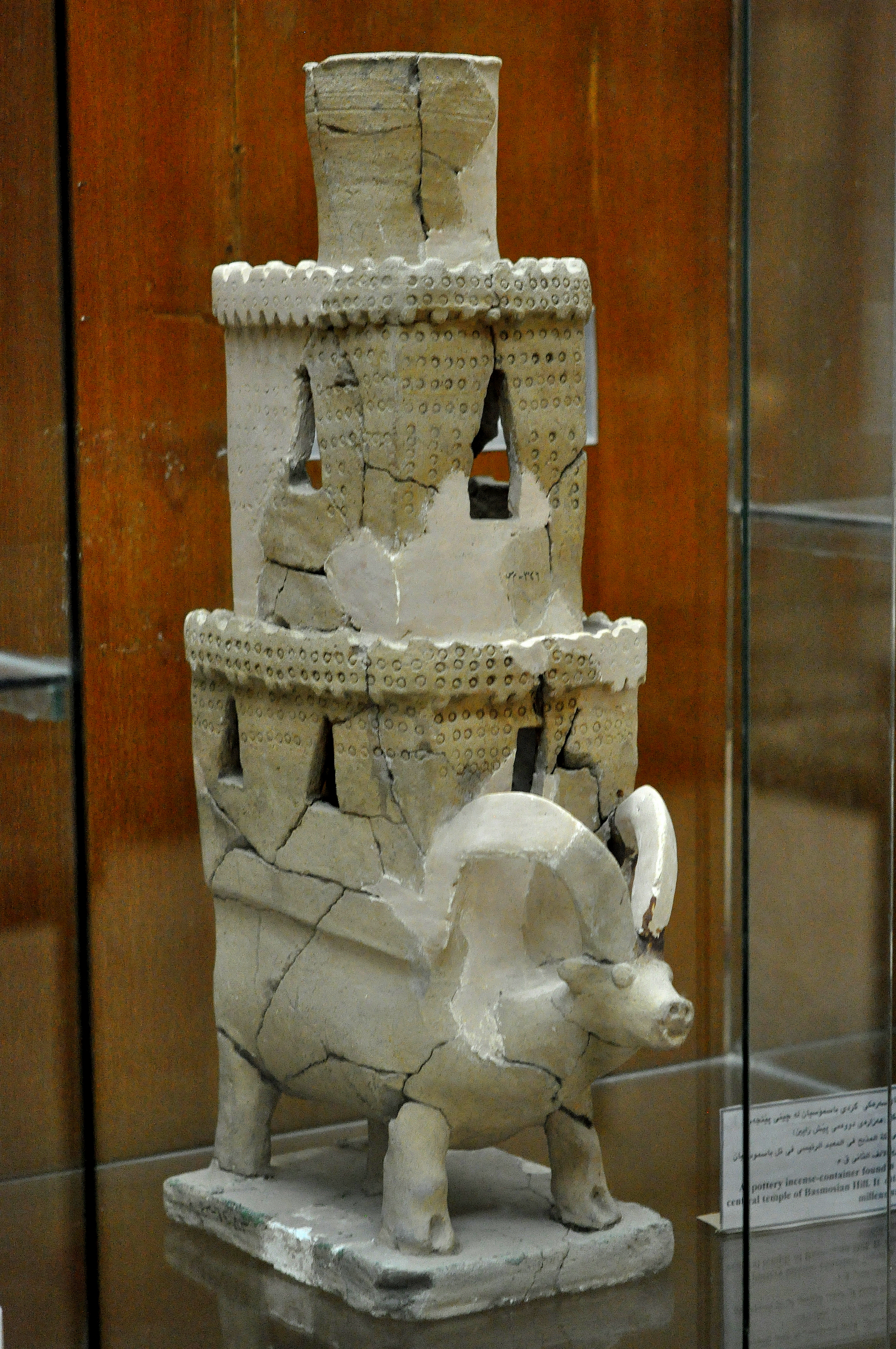
Hurrian incense container from Tell Bazmusian, Sulaymaniyah Museum

Tell Bazmusian (also Tell Basmusian) is an archaeological site on the right bank of the Little Zab in the Ranya Plain (Sulaymaniyah Governorate, Iraq). The site was excavated between 1956 and 1958, with the first season directed by Abu al-Soof and the remaining two seasons by A. al-Tikriti, as part of a salvage operation to document cultural remains that would be flooded by Lake Dukan, the reservoir created by the Dukan Dam which was being built at that time. The final two seasons remain unpublished. Apart from Tell Bazmusian, four other sites were excavated during this operation: ed-Dem, Kamarian, Qarashina and Tell Shemshara. Bazmusian is a tell, or settlement mound, with a circumference of 1,500 metres (4,900 ft) and a height of 23 metres (75 ft). Together with Tell Shemshara, it is one of the largest archaeological sites in the Ranya Plain. When the excavations started, the southeast flank of the mound was occupied by a village that was only established at the beginning of the 20th century. The site is now submerged under Lake Dukan.

The excavations have revealed 16 occupation layers, ranging from the Samarra culture (sixth millennium BCE) up to the ninth century CE. The finds of level I consisted of a fragmented pebble foundations, ninth-century CE pottery and mudbricks. Level II also contained Islamic material. Level III, to be dated to the late second millennium BCE, contained a single-room temple with thick mudbrick walls. Pottery dated to the mid- to late-second millennium BCE. In a pit outside of this temple, several clay tablet fragments were found. Although they were too damaged to be read, based on stylistic details they could be dated to the Middle Assyrian period. An earlier version of this temple was uncovered in level IV. In level V, plastered mudbrick walls were found. Levels VI–XVI contained material dating to the third millennium BCE, the Uruk period and of the Samarra and Halaf cultures but this has not yet been published.
