= Otto E. Ravn =

Danish Assyriologist

Otto Emil Ravn (30 November 1881, Aalborg – 18 November 1952, Skovshoved) was a Danish Assyriologist and professor at the University of Copenhagen.
