= Lake Dukan =

- دووکان (Kurdish)
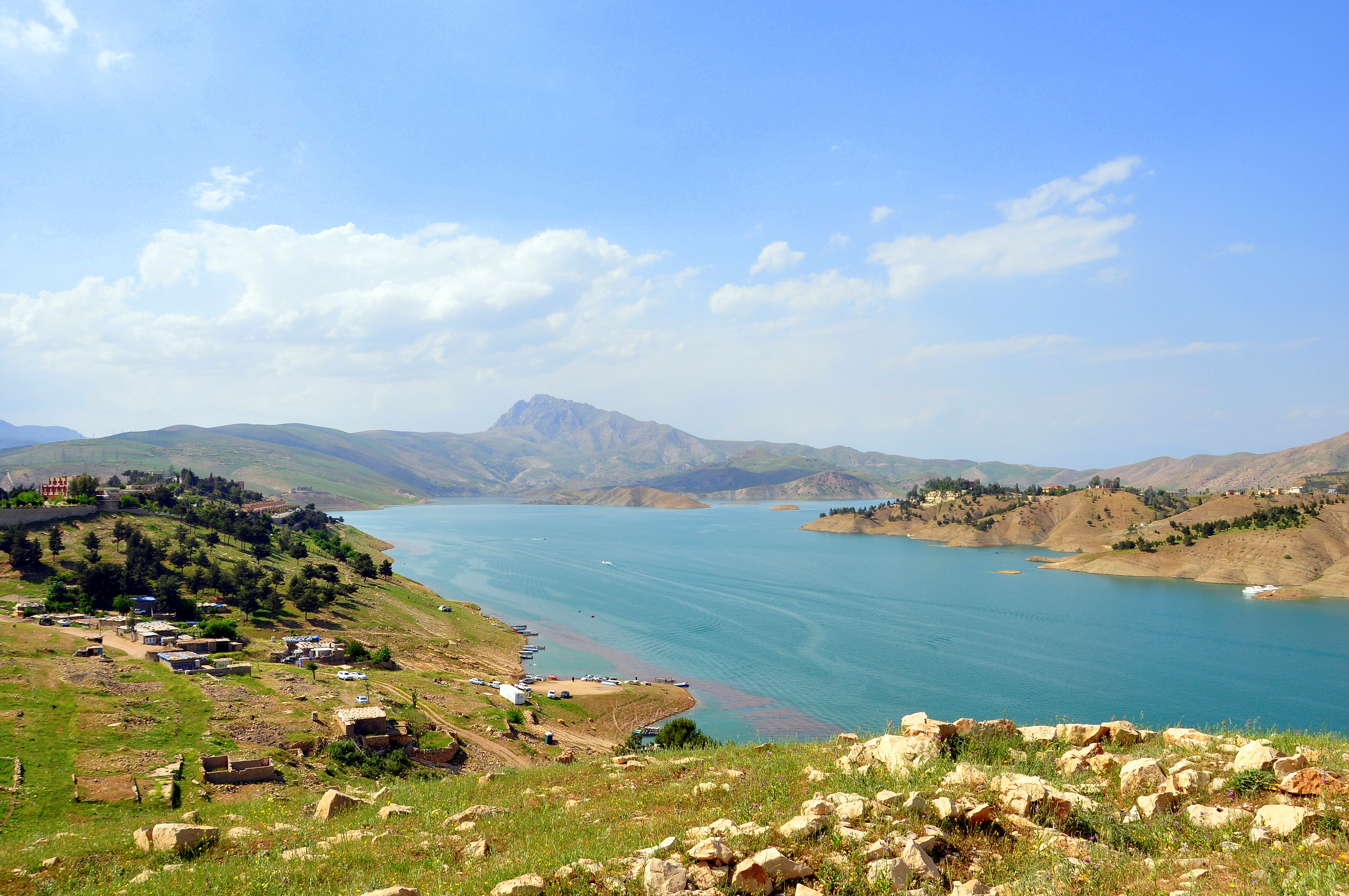
- Lake Dukan

- Location within Iraq
- Interactive map of Lake Dukan
- Location: Sulaymaniyah Governorate, Kurdistan Region, Iraq
- Coordinates: 36°08′N 44°55′E
- Type: Reservoir
- Part of: Little Zab
- Primary inflows: Little Zab
- Primary outflows: Little Zab
- Catchment area: 11,700 km^{2} (4,500 sq mi)
- Basin countries: Kurdistan
- Built: January 1, 1954
- First flooded: January 1, 1959
- Surface area: 270 km^{2} (100 sq mi)
- Water volume: 6.8–8.3 km^{3} (1.6–2.0 cu mi)
- Surface elevation: 515 m (1,690 ft)
- Website: Lake Dukan Rowing Club

Lake Dukan (or Lake Dokan; Kurdish: دەریاچەی دووکان; Arabic: بحيرة دوكان) is a lake in Sulaymaniyah Governorate, Kurdistan Region, Iraq. It is located close to the city of Ranya, and is a reservoir on the Little Zab created by the construction of the Dukan Dam. The Dukan Dam was built between 1954 and 1959 as a multi-purpose dam to provide water storage, irrigation and hydroelectricity. Prior to the flooding of Lake Dukan, the area was subjected to archaeological research to investigate as many archaeological sites as possible. An archaeological survey in the Ranya Plain documented some 40 archaeological sites with evidence for occupation ranging from the sixth millennium BCE up to the present. Five of these sites were then excavated: Tell Bazmusian, ed-Dem, Kamarian, Qarashina and Tell Shemshara. The excavations at Tell Bazmusian revealed a temple dating to the second millennium BCE. At Tell Shemshara, an early-sixth millennium BCE village was excavated, as well as an early-second millennium BCE palace with a small archive of clay tablets. The inhabitants of some 50 villages in the flooded area, around 1,000–1,200 families, were resettled to the west of the lake.

The surface area of the lake is 270 square kilometres (100 sq mi). At normal operation, the capacity of the reservoir is 6.8 cubic kilometres (1.6 cu mi) while its maximum capacity is 8.3 cubic kilometres (2.0 cu mi). At that capacity, the surface elevation is 515 metres (1,690 ft) above sea-level. In order to operate the power station, the surface elevation must be between 469 and 511 metres (1,539 and 1,677 ft). The drainage basin of the Dukan Dam is 11,700 square kilometres (4,500 sq mi).

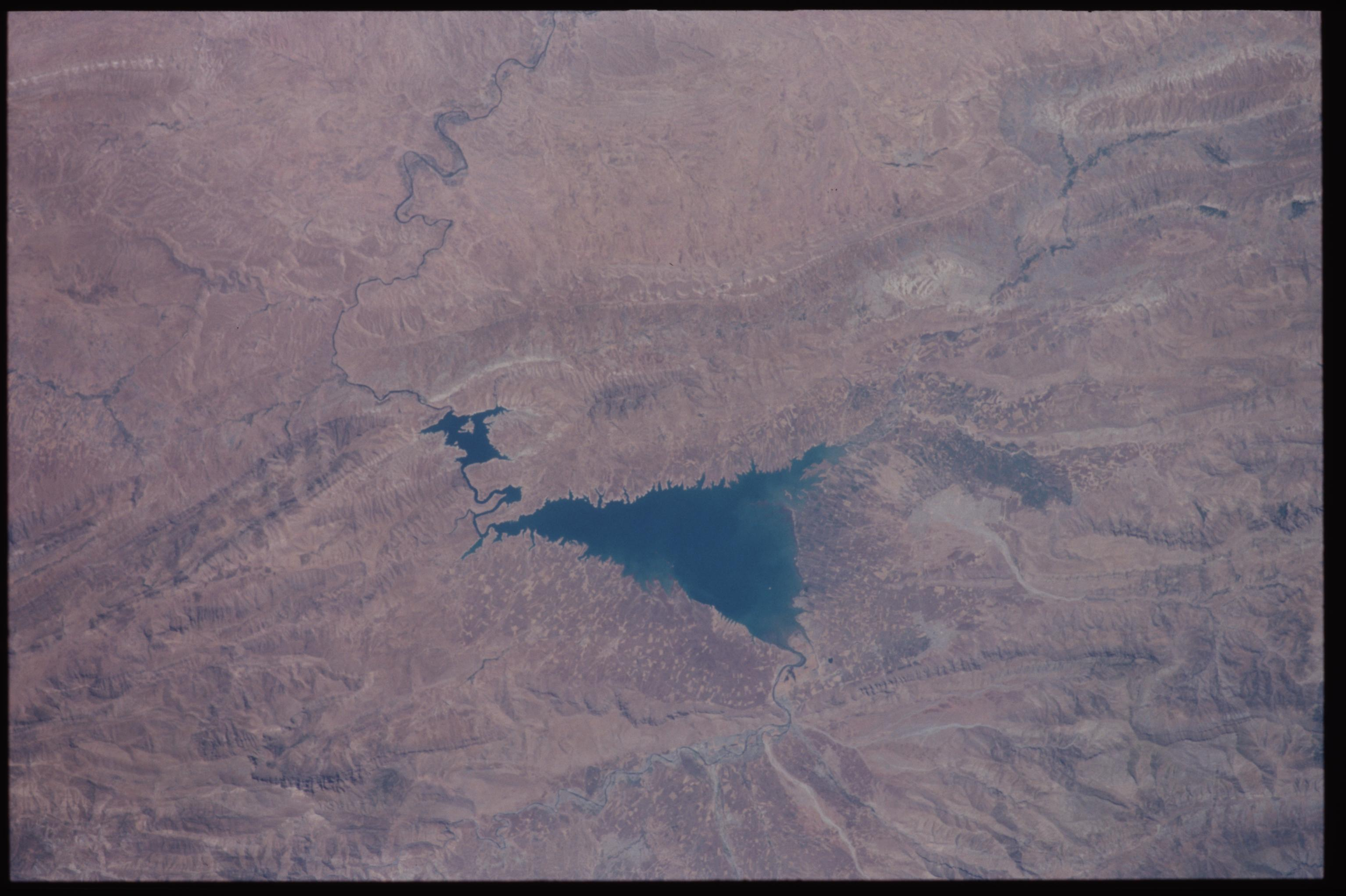
Dukan reservoir, 2001

== See also ==
- List of reservoirs and dams in Iraq
