= Genaw Pond =

Lake in Sulaymaniyah Province, Iraq

- Qorah Ko, Purple Pond, Ranya Pond
- Location of Genaw Pond
- Interactive map of Genaw Pond
- Location: Ranya District, Sulaymaniyah Governorate, Kurdistan Region, Iraq
- Coordinates: 36.214311°N 44.938451°E
- Type: Pond
- Basin countries: Kurdistan

Genaw Pond (Kurdish: گۆمی گەناو, romanized: Gomî Genaw) is a pond in Ranya District, within Sulaymaniyah Governorate, in the Kurdistan Region of Iraq. It is located approximately 50 km from the center of Ranya District.

The lake is also known as "Qurago Pond" or "the Purple Pond", due to its distinctive coloration which is not uncommon in such lakes, where the still waters contain elevated levels of sulfur, leading to the proliferation of diverse types of algae and bacteria. As temperatures increase, the water level declines, reducing the dissolved oxygen concentration in the water, which causes the algae to take on a purple or red.

== Nomenclature ==
The Pond is referred to by a number of different names, including:

- Genaw Pond
- Qurago Pond
- Purple Pond
