= Ranya =

City in the Kurdistan Region, Iraq

Ranya ڕانیە (Kurdish)
- Town
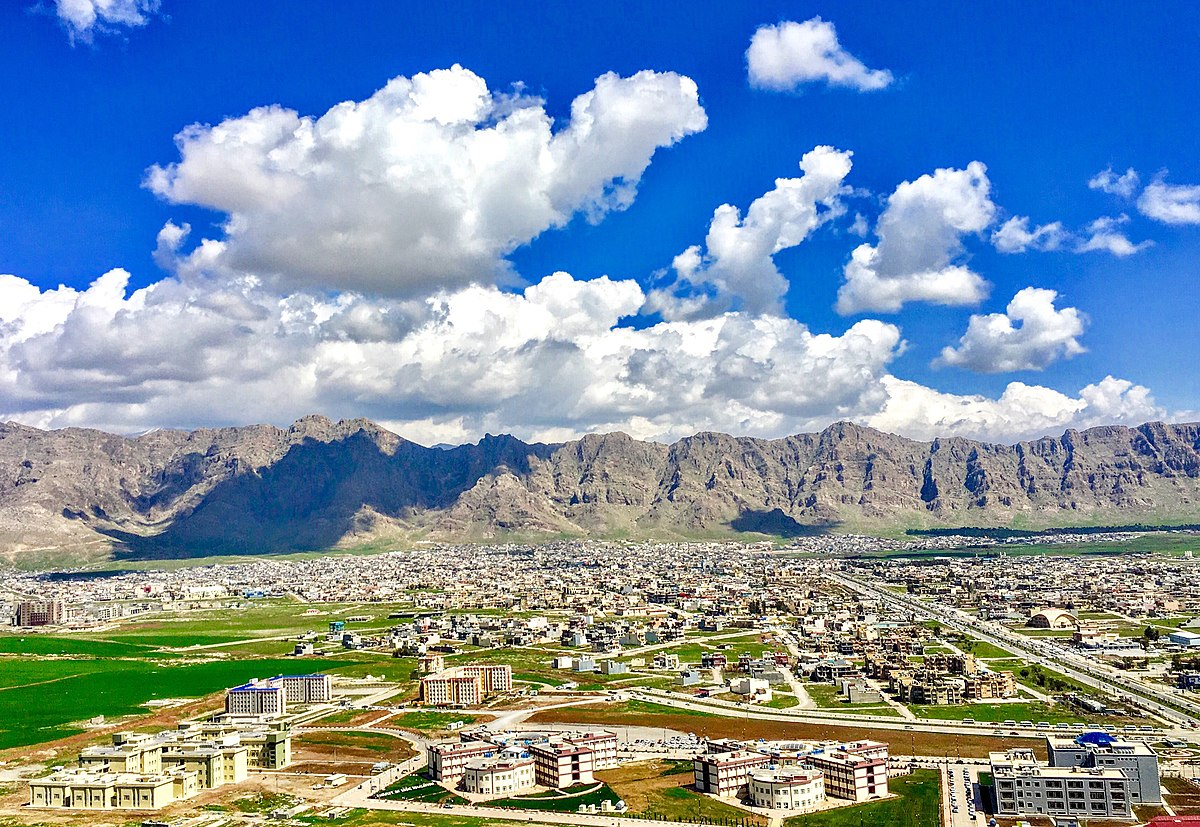
- View of Ranya in 2022

- Location within the Kurdistan Region
- Coordinates: 36°15′18″N 44°53′01″E
- Country: Iraq
- Autonomous region: Kurdistan Region
- Governorate: Sulaymaniyah Governorate
- District: Ranya District
- Elevation: 1,300 m (4,300 ft)

Population (2020)
  - Total: 197,700
- Time zone: +3
- Website: raparin.gov.krd

Ranya (Sorani Kurdish: ڕانیە, romanized: Ranye, Arabic: رانية) is a town located in the Kurdistan Region of Iraq, and is part of the Sulaymaniyah Governorate. The town and its inhabitants are well known for their involvement in the 1991 Uprising (Kurdish: Raperîn) against Ba'athist Iraq .

== Geographical location ==
Ranya is located in the Sulaymaniyah Governorate in the Kurdistan Region of Iraq, approximately 70 km northeast of Sulaymaniyah city. It is situated near the Hawraman mountains. The town lies at an altitude of about 1,300 meters. A few kilometers south of the town is Lake Dukan, the largest lake in the Kurdistan Region.

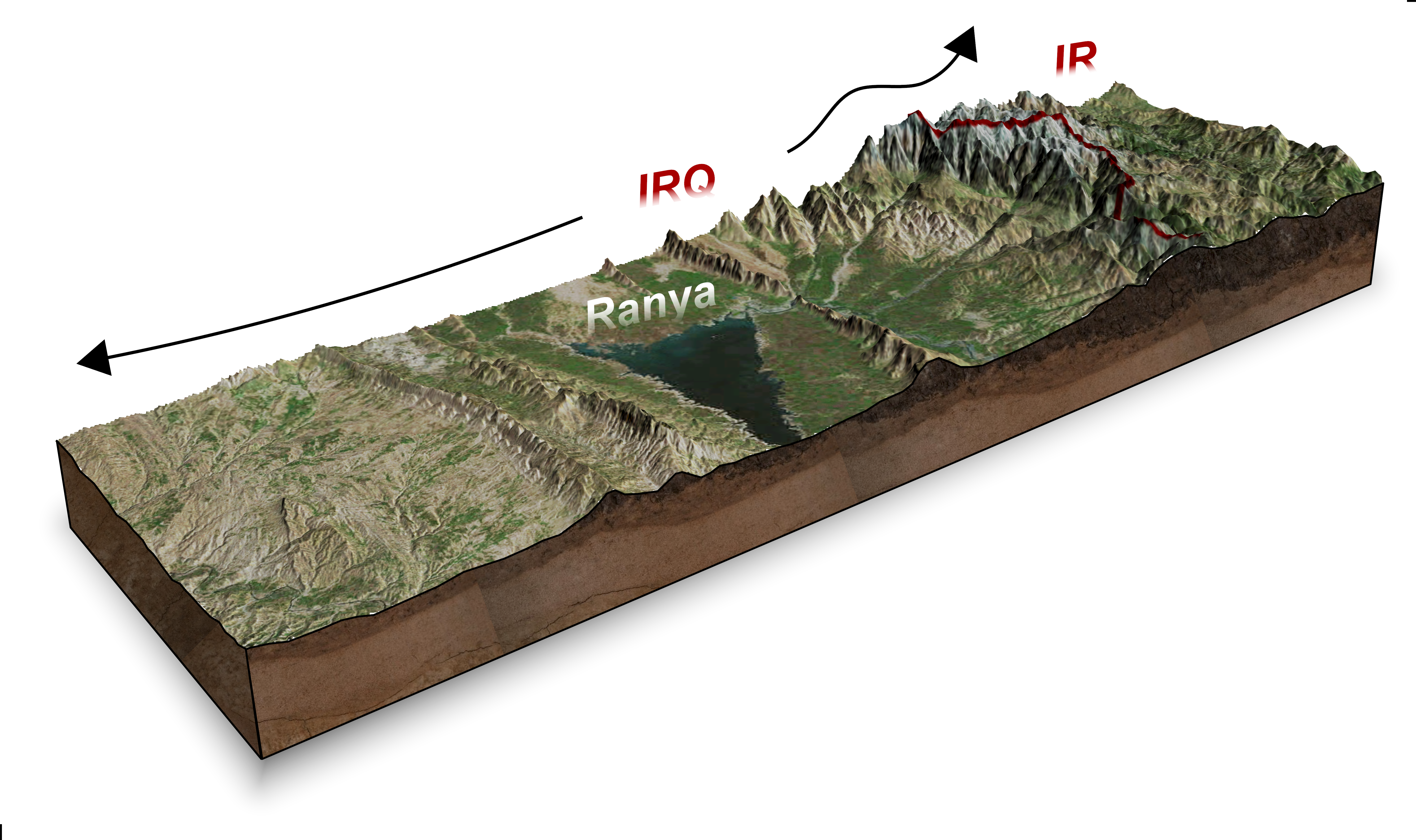
The Rania Plain: Where the Iranian Highlands meet the Iraqi Kurdistan Lowlands.

== History ==
Ranya has a significant historical role as a center of Kurdish culture and Kurdish political activity, particularly in relation to Kurdish nationalism. The town was a focal point during key moments in the Iraqi–Kurdish conflict, which has had a lasting influence on the region. Ranya played a central role in the 1991 Kurdish uprising; on May 5, 1991, local civilians and Peshmerga forces successfully expelled the Iraqi army of Saddam Hussein from the town following a two-week confrontation. The anniversy of the uprising is regularly celebrated with guests from all over Kurdistan.

Ranya's ancient significance is also notable, with archaeological findings in the region revealing the presence of early civilizations, contributing to its cultural heritage.

== Economy ==
The economy of Ranya is primarily based on agriculture, particularly the cultivation of fruits and vegetables due to the region's fertile land. Additionally, the town has been developing its infrastructure and services, promoting local tourism.

== Demographics ==
The population of Ranya consists exclusively of Kurds. As of 2020, the population was estimated to be 257,577.

== Culture ==
Ranya is known for its cultural heritage, including traditional Kurdish music, dance, and festivals. The region hosts several cultural events that celebrate Kurdish traditions.

== Tourism ==
The town has several natural attractions, including mountains, lakes and rivers, making it a destination for hiking and outdoor activities. Notable tourist sites and events contribute to Ranya's growing popularity as a tourism destination.

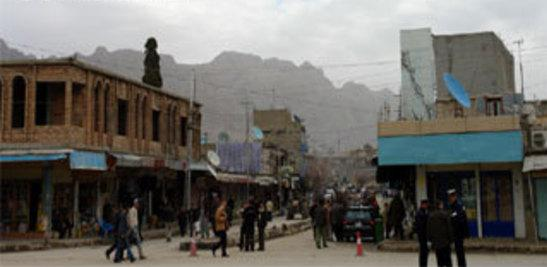
Street in Ranya

== Sister Cities ==
Ranya is twinned with:

- Duluth, Minnesota, United States

== See also ==
- Lake Kanaw
