= Dukan Dam =

Dam in Sulaymaniyah Governorate, Kurdistan Region

Dukan (Dokan) Dam
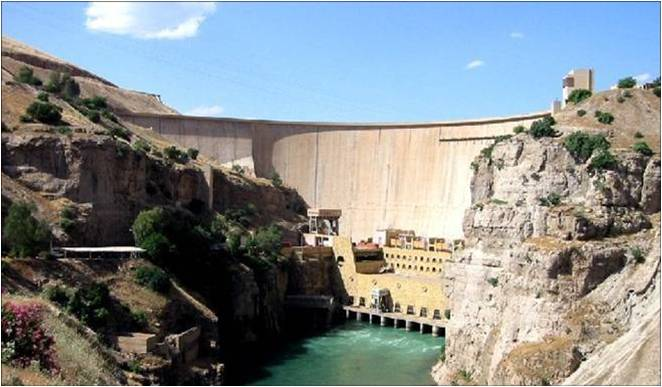

- Location within Iraq
- Location: As Sulaymaniyah Governorate, Kurdistan Region
- Coordinates: 35°57′15″N 44°57′10″E
- Status: Operational
- Construction began: 1954
- Opening date: 1959
- Operator: Ministry of Water Resources

Dam and spillways
- Type of dam: Cylindrical arch
- Impounds: Little Zab
- Height: 116.5 m (382 ft)
- Length: 360 m (1,180 ft)
- Elevation at crest: 516 m (1,693 ft)
- Width (crest): 6.2 m (20 ft)
- Width (base): 34.3 m (113 ft)
- Dam volume: 370,000 m^{3} (480,000 cu yd)
- Spillways: 2
- Spillway type: Service: Tunnel; Emergency: Bell-mouth
- Spillway capacity: Service: 2,450 m^{3}/s (86,521 cu ft/s); Emergency: 1,860 m^{3}/s (65,685 cu ft/s)

Reservoir
- Creates: Lake Dukan
- Total capacity: 6,970,000,000 m^{3} (5,650,671 acre⋅ft)
- Active capacity: 6,100,000,000 m^{3} (4,945,350 acre⋅ft)
- Inactive capacity: 790,000,000 m^{3} (640,463 acre⋅ft)
- Catchment area: 11,690 km^{2} (4,514 mi^{2})
- Surface area: 270 km^{2} (104 mi^{2})
- Normal elevation: 511 m (1,677 ft)

Power Station
- Commission date: 1979
- Hydraulic head: 95 m (312 ft) (rated)
- Turbines: 5 x 80 MW Francis-type
- Installed capacity: 400 MW

The Dukan Dam (Sorani Kurdish: بەنداوی دووکان Arabic: سد دوكان) is a multi-purpose concrete arch dam in As Sulaymaniyah Governorate, Kurdistan Region of Iraq. It impounds the Little Zab, thereby creating Lake Dukan. The Dukan Dam was built between 1954 and 1959 whereas its power station became fully operational in 1979. The dam is 360 metres (1,180 ft) long and 116.5 metres (382 ft) high and its hydroelectric power station has a maximum capacity of 400 MW.

== Project history ==
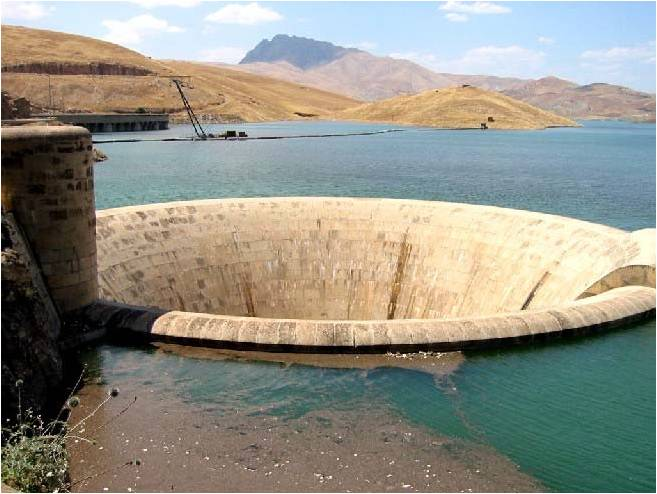
Emergency bell mouth spillway

The Dukan Dam was built between 1954 and 1959 as a multi-purpose dam to provide water storage, irrigation and hydroelectricity. The design for the dam was carried out by the British engineering company Binnie & Partners (with Partner and third generation Binnie engineer Geoffrey Binnie the key engineer). Additional structural analysis was done for Binnie by his friends at Imperial College, Professor Pippard and Letitia Chitty, who "developed a stress analysis technique using relaxation methods and a rubber model to verify the design form."

Prior to the flooding of Lake Dukan, the area was subjected to archaeological research to investigate as many archaeological sites as possible. An archaeological survey in the Ranya Plain documented some 40 archaeological sites with evidence for occupation ranging from the sixth millennium BCE up to the present. Five of these sites were then excavated: Tell Bazmusian, ed-Dem, Kamarian, Qarashina and Tell Shemshara. The excavations at Tell Bazmusian revealed a temple dating to the second millennium BCE. At Tell Shemshara, an early-sixth millennium BCE village was excavated, as well as an early-second millennium BCE palace with a small archive of clay tablets. The inhabitants of some 50 villages in the flooded area, around 1,000–1,200 families, were resettled to the west of the lake. The power station was designed in 1973 by the Russian company Hydroproject and became operational in 1979.

In 1990 the dam was used to house a group of 'human shield' hostages. They were held initially at the guest lodge nearby, thereafter in the offices adjacent to the cafeteria inside the dam and later inside prefabricated huts on the top of the dam. The intention was to deter coalition air strikes in the upcoming 1991 Gulf war. They were released in December 1990 and returned home.

Due to lack of maintenance and repairs, the power station has underperformed and is now, after 30 years of service, due for replacement. In 2007, the World Bank began a US$40 million project to repair the Dokan and Darbandikhan Dams. Repairs to the Dokan Dam are expected to cost over $8 million and be complete in late 2012.

== Characteristics of the dam ==
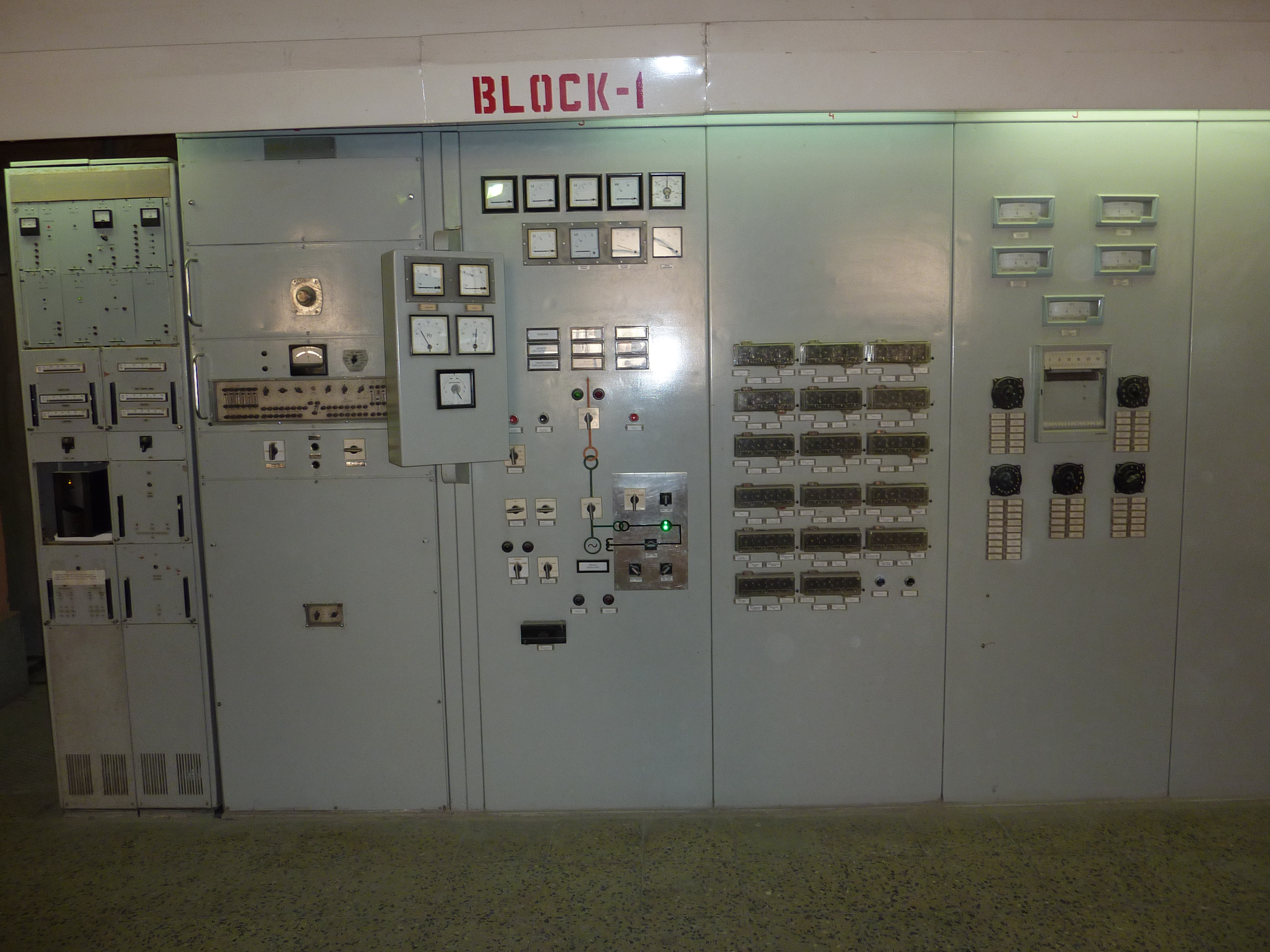
Newly installed Italian made control unit for turbine 1 installed 2010

The Dukan Dam is a multi-purpose concrete arch dam abutted by gravity monoliths. It is 360 metres (1,180 ft) long and 116.5 metres (382 ft) high. At its base it is 32.5 metres (107 ft) wide, tapering off to 6.2 metres (20 ft) at the top. The combined maximum discharge of the dam is 4,300 cubic metres (150,000 cu ft) per second. This is divided over a spillway tunnel with three radial gates having a combined maximum discharge of 2,440 cubic metres (86,000 cu ft) per second, and an emergency bell mouth spillway with a capacity of 1,860 cubic metres (66,000 cu ft) per second. Two irrigation outlets with a combined discharge of 220 cubic metres (7,800 cu ft) per second have not been operated over the last ten years. The powerhouse of five Francis units at 80 MW each releases between 110 and 550 cubic metres (3,900 and 19,400 cu ft) per second. Lake Dukan, the reservoir created by the Dukan Dam, has a surface area of 270 square kilometres (100 sq mi). Its anticipated capacity is 6.8 cubic kilometres (1.6 cu mi) with a maximum of 8.3 cubic kilometres (2.0 cu mi).

== See also ==
- List of dams and reservoirs in Iraq
