= Al-Sarraji Mosque =

Former mosque in Basra, Iraq

- جامع السراجي
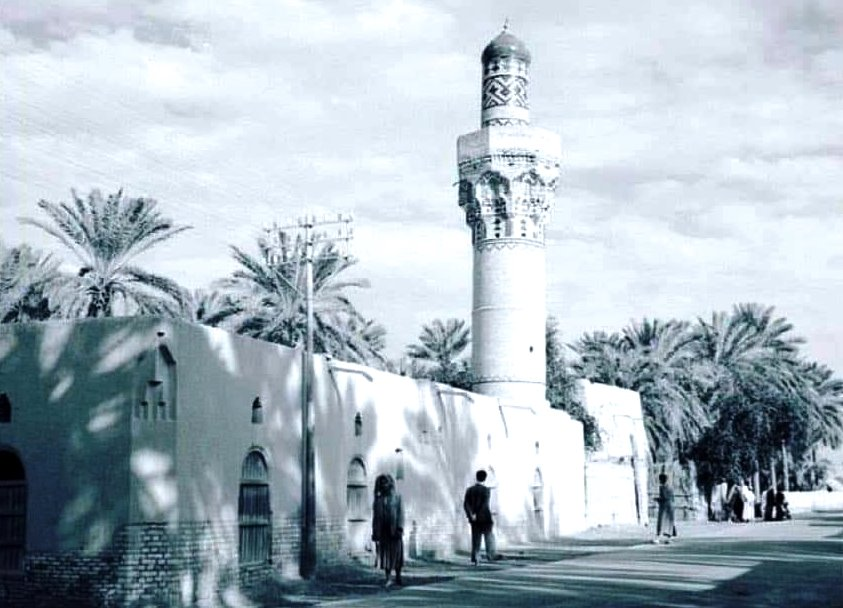
- The mosque in the 1940s or 1950s

Religion
- Affiliation: Sunni Islam (former)
- Ecclesiastical or organisational status: Mosque (1727–2023)
- Status: Demolished (2023)

Location
- Location: Abi al-Khasib district, Basra, Basra Governorate
- Country: Iraq

Architecture
- Type: Mosque architecture
- Established: 1727 CE
- Demolished: July 14, 2023

Specifications
- Length: 11 m (36 ft)
- Width: 18 m (59 ft)
- Dome: Two: (demolished)
- Minaret: One: (demolished)
- Minaret height: 11 m (36 ft)
- Site area: 1,900 m^{2} (20,000 sq ft)
- Materials: Ceramic tiles

The Al-Sarraji Mosque (Arabic: جامع السراجي) is a former Sunni mosque, that was located in the Abi al-Khasib district in Basra, in the Basra Governorate of Iraq. The Al-Sarraji Mosque is characterized by its ancient heritage and archaeological architecture and is distinguished by its luxurious archaeological minaret built of ancient bricks. The mosque is registered with on the Iraqi list of heritage places.

On July 14, 2023, al-Sarraji Mosque was demolished in order to widen Abi al-Khasib Street in response to the demands of citizens and vehicle owners, due to the severe crowds being in the middle of the street. This move caused great controversy among Iraqis and activists criticized the government their failure to protect Iraq's heritage and culture. Although there have been proposals to reconstruct the mosque.

== Historical background ==
=== Establishment and significance ===
The mosque was constructed in 1727, sources indicate that it was restored by Abd al-Wahhab Pasha in 1902 from adobe and mud on a 1,900-square-metre (20,000 sq ft) site. In the 20th century and specifically the 1980s, various donations helped to fund restoration of the mosque which made it a significant part of the local community’s cultural and historical landscape. In 2002, the mosque was renovated and reconstructed by Umm Hamid Al-Tuwaijri, a philanthropist. The mosque was one of the largest mosques in Basra and was nicknamed "The Great Basra Mosque" before the construction of the Great Basra Mosque. The five daily prayers, the Friday prayers, and the two Eid prayers were held in the mosque. It was also called the Mosque of Minawi Lijm al-Kabir, because the area was named village of Minawi Lijam before its expansion.

Its 11-metre-high (36 ft) minaret was regarded as one of the last Islamic minarets of its kind in Basra, the other being the minaret at the al-Kawaz Mosque. The minaret predates both the Big Ben and the Eiffel Tower. It included a spacious chapel that was 18 metres (59 ft) wide and was 11 metres (36 ft) long, which made it one of the largest mosques in Basra.

=== Controversy over demolition ===
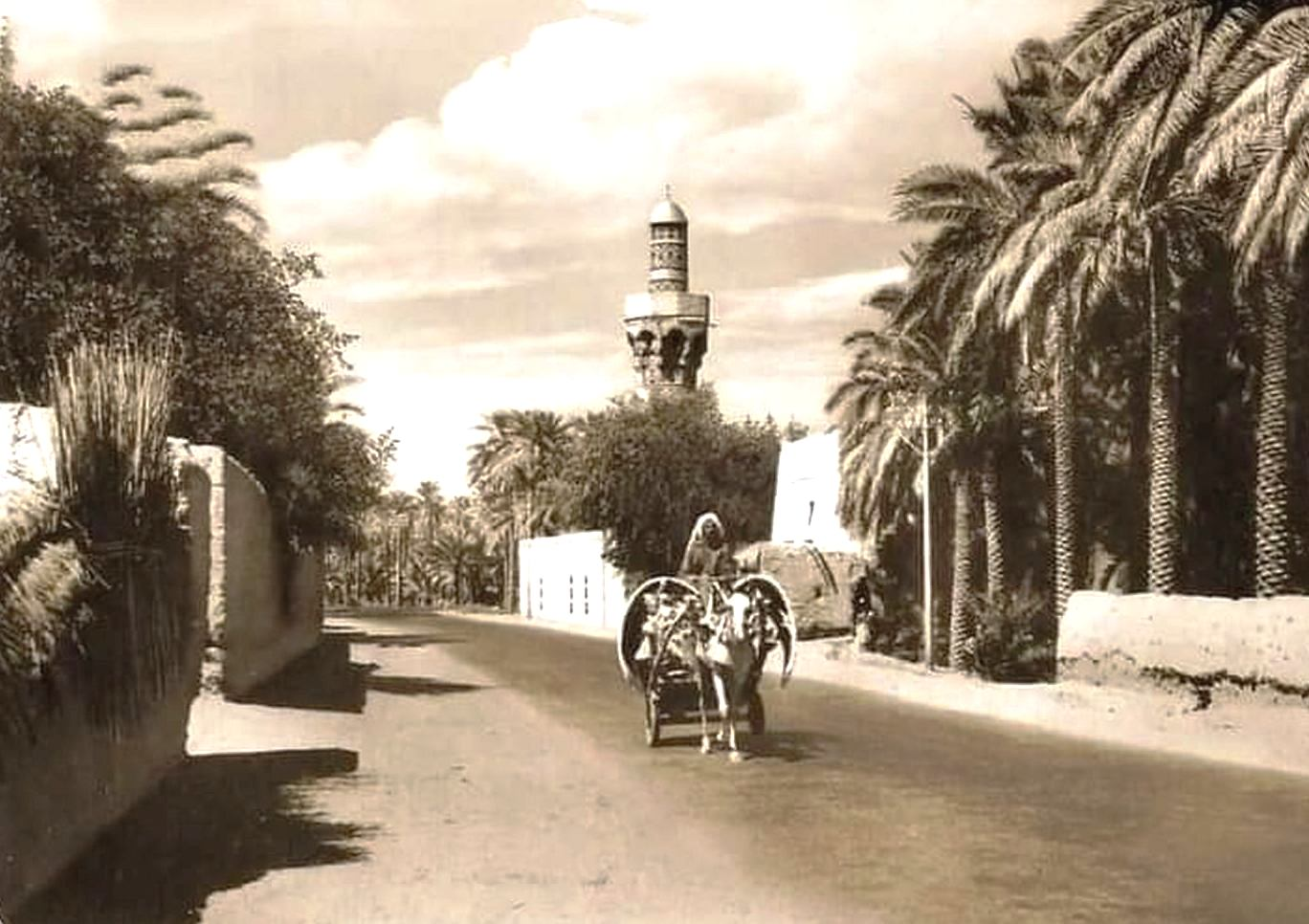
Al-Sarraji Mosque in the 1960s.

In 2022, Iraqi media reported that demolition of the mosque was threatened, following an agreement between the Sunni Endowment Office and the local government in Basra, in order to expand the tourist routes. However the Director of Media of the Sunni Endowment, Mahmoud al-Qaisi, said that the office cannot do such approvals. Nevertheless, there were many calls to stop the demolition of the mosque and many Iraqis took to social media to raise awareness and express their anger and dissatisfaction. Some noted how other countries preserve their heritage, civilization, and culture, except Iraq which keeps getting demolished. It was also discovered that the minaret was skewed at an angle of 20 degrees, which made it liable to fall.

On the morning of Friday, July 14, 2023, the local government in Basra Governorate began the process of demolishing and removing the mosque in order to complete the expansion of the Abu al-Khasib coastal road and due to citizen complaints. The demolition was despite the popular rejection of the idea. The governor of Basra, Asaad al-Eidani, stated that the mosque would be rebuilt in a different location. Some criticized the governor for not thinking of another solution like building a tunnel under the mosque. In response to the demolition, the Ministry of Culture expressed its anger, noting that it would take legal measures to protect the cultural heritage from any transgression, stressing that the local government in Basra ignored the ministry's proposals to avoid demolishing the mosque.

The demolition of the mosque caused great controversy in Iraq and many expressed their anger and, on social media, criticized the government. The demolition was called a "crime", legal violation, cultural shock, sectarian challenge, and civilizational sabotage, and many called for legal measures to be taken to protect any building that bears a heritage or archaeological feature, whether religious or civil, in Iraq that has been suffering from neglect for years. It was also theorized by some that the demolition was on purpose in order to destroy Iraq's heritage.

As the situation evolved, questions were raised about the balance between urban development and the preservation of cultural heritage. It was noted that the urban expansions, while usually considered necessary for progress and convenience, it also costs the erasure of historical landmarks that Iraq is famous for. Thus, the controversy was compared to many similar events around the world that involve tension between urbanization and preservation.

On July 15, 2023, the governor addressed the Ministry of Planning, requesting that the project for the construction of al-Sarraji Mosque must be included in the budget of the Petro-Dula at a cost of one billion and eighty-seven million Iraqi dinars for the benefit of the Sunni Endowment Office, and mentioned in their request that the mosque project includes a courtyard, health and service accessories, and classes for teaching the Qur’an. As well as a library for religious books. The Ministry claimed to restore the mosque similar to what's happening with the Great Mosque of al-Nuri.

It was also noted that the Sunni Endowment Office was not informed of the demolishing plans and process despite not agreeing to the act.

== See also ==
- Islam in Iraq
- List of mosques in Iraq
