= Al-Ajbal Mosque =

Mosque in Basra, Iraq

- مسجد الاجبال
- Location of the mosque in Iraq

Religion
- Affiliation: Islam
- Ecclesiastical or organizational status: Mosque
- Status: Active

Location
- Location: Al Amitahiyah district, Basra, Basra Governorate
- Country: Iraq
- Interactive map of Al-Ajbal Mosque
- Coordinates: 30°28′56″N 47°49′49″E

Architecture
- Type: Mosque architecture
- Style: Modern Iraqi (1998)
- Funded by: Khalil al-Aqrab (1998)
- Completed: 1397 CE; 1998 (reconstruction)

Specifications
- Capacity: 150 worshippers
- Length: 7 m (23 ft)
- Width: 15 m (49 ft)
- Dome: One
- Minaret: One
- Materials: Mud brick (1397)

The Al-Ajbal Mosque, also known as the Al-Aqrab Mosque or the Al-Saghir Mosque of Manawi Lajim, is a historic mosque located in the Al Amitahiyah district of Manawi Lajim neighbourhood near Abu al-Khaseeb in Basra, in the Basra Governorate of Iraq. It can accommodate at least 150 worshippers. The mosque dates from the late 14th century; and was extensively remodelled in 1998.

== History ==
The mosque was formerly a mud brick structure, built in the late fourteenth century. It was later rebuilt with clay brick and plaster. In 1998, a complete reconstruction of the mosque was funded by Khalil al-Aqrab, a philanthropic businessman. In 2001, maintenance works were funded by Sharqiyah Ahmad al-Naami, a philanthropist.

== Architecture ==
Remodelled in 1998 in a modern Iraqi style, the mosque can be entered through a wooden door. The prayer hall is 7 metres (23 ft) long and 15 metres (49 ft) wide. The roof is supported by four large pillars. Next to the qibla, there is a platform, supported by five curved concrete columns. Facing this platform is a large assembly area, which is 20 metres (66 ft) long and 82 metres (269 ft) wide.

== See also ==
- List of mosques in Iraq
- Islam in Iraq
