= Al-Kawaz Mosque =

Ancient mosque in Basra, Iraq

- جامع الكواز
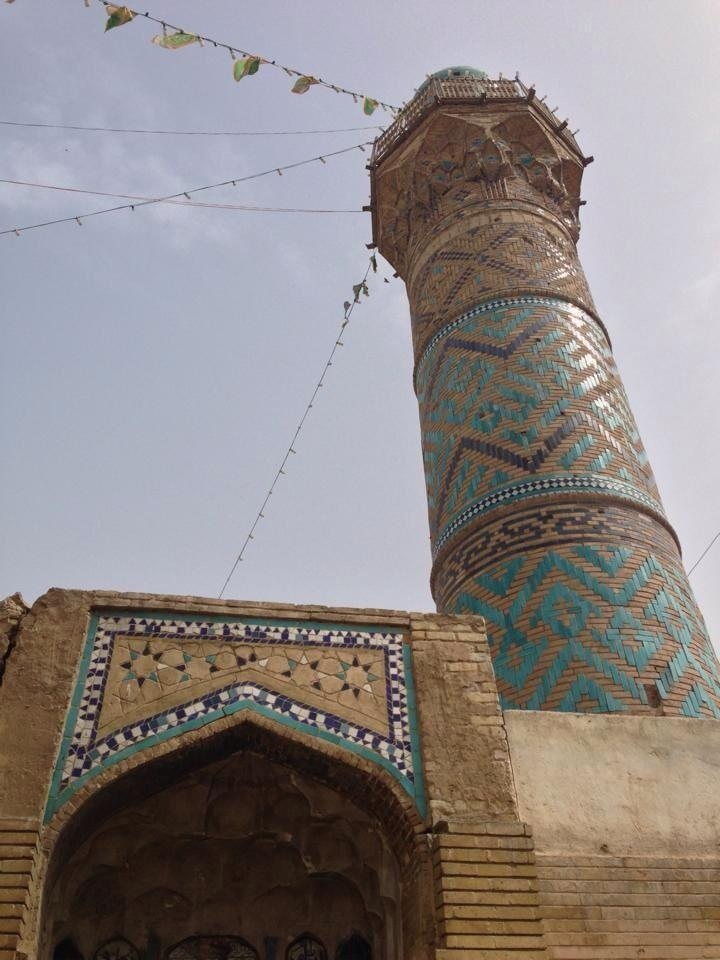
- The mosque minaret in 2013

Religion
- Affiliation: Islam
- Ecclesiastical or organizational status: Mosque
- Status: Active

Location
- Location: Basra, Basra Governorate
- Country: Iraq

Architecture
- Type: Mosque architecture
- Style: Iraqi Islamic
- Founder: Sheikh Sari al-Abbasi
- Completed: 1514 CE

Specifications
- Dome: One
- Minaret: One
- Minaret height: 25 m (82 ft)
- Site area: 1,000 m^{2} (11,000 sq ft)
- Shrines: Two: Sheikh Muhammad Amin al-Kawaz; A son of Musa al-Kazim
- Materials: Stone; bricks

The Al-Kawaz Mosque (Arabic: جامع الكواز) is a mosque in Basra, in the Basra Governorate of Iraq. Established in 1514 CE, it was built by a branch of Banu al-Abbas and, along with the al-Sarraji Mosque, has one of the two remaining Islamic-style minarets in Basra. The mosque is named in honour of Sheikh Muhammad Amin al-Kawaz, a Sufi mystic of the Shadhili order.

== History ==
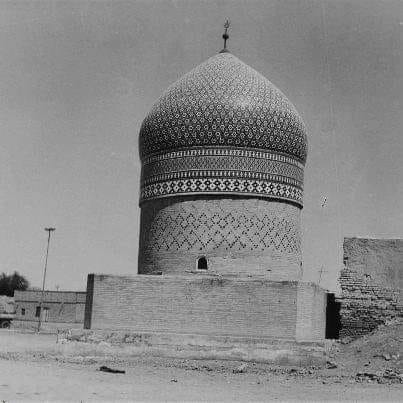
Dome of al-Kawaz Mosque in the 1960s

The mosque was founded in 1514 and built by Sheikh Sari al-Abbasi in three days. It was originally built from reeds as a simple structure, and was rebuilt in 1523 by his son, Abd al-Qadir, in stone.

Sheikh Muhammad Amin al-Kawaz, the mystic Sheikh of the Shadhili order, used to teach the Qu'ran and religious sciences from the mosque. When al-Kawaz died in 1546, he was buried in the mosque.

In 1602, a descendent of Sheikh Sari, Sheikh Abd al-Salam II al-Abbasi, built the current dome of the mosque and a minaret. The mosque is in the sledge and is considered one of the rare minarets built in Islamic architecture and design at that time in Basra. The dome was erected on top of the tomb of Sheikh al-Kawaz and was decorated in multi-colored Faience which was very popular with architecture at the time. In the 18th century, the minaret of al-Kawaz Mosque was the highest point in all of Basra. The mosque contains two tombs. One is the tomb of one of the sons of Musa al-Kazim, and the other is the circular tomb of Sheikh Muhammad Amin al-Kawaz, the mystic Sufi leader of Shadhili order in Basra whom the mosque is named after.

During the Gulf War, al-Kawaz Mosque was one of the many archaeological sites in Iraq that were affected by looting.

== Architecture ==
The mosque is made of bricks and includes a minaret and a dome which is built on a cylindrical body on top of the tomb of Sheikh al-Kawaz. The minaret of the mosque is located on a square base of stone. The base is approximately 5 metres (16 ft) tall with the cylindrical body of the minaret is built with bricks and stucco and is approximately 10 metres (33 ft) long. A basin is located on it which tops various muqarnas. The body of the minaret is decorated with various panels consisting of Kufic inscriptions and arranged in proportions by the wavy black brick border. The letters of the Kufic inscriptions, which includes the name "Allah", are written using glazed bricks in light blue livery.

== See also ==
- Islam in Iraq
- List of mosques in Iraq
