= Iraqi Territorial Sea =

- Interactive map of Iraqi Territorial Sea
- Location: Al-Faw District, Basra Governorate, Iraq
- Basin countries: Iraq

The Iraqi Territorial Sea (Arabic: البحر الإقليمي العراقي, romanized: al-Bahr al-Iqlimi al-Iraqi) refers to the maritime baseline and territorial waters under the sovereignty of the Republic of Iraq. Located at the northern tip of the Persian Gulf within the Al-Faw District of the Basra Governorate, Iraq's international coastline extends for approximately 58 kilometers.

The maritime jurisdiction spans from the Thalweg line with Iran at the mouth of the Shatt al-Arab, continuing past Ras al-Bisha to the eastern coast of Khor Abdullah, and reaching the entrance of Khor al-Zubair. Iraq claims a territorial sea breadth of 12 nautical miles extending toward the high seas. The Persian Gulf is relatively shallow, reaching its greatest depth of 110 meters near the Strait of Hormuz, while its shallowest zone is located at its northern apex within Iraq's territorial waters.

In January and February 2026, Iraq officially deposited its updated geographical coordinates and maritime baselines with the United Nations, outlining its straight baselines, territorial sea, contiguous zone, exclusive economic zone (EEZ), and continental shelf boundaries. Geographically, the majority of the Iraqi coast lies inside Khor Abdullah, which is shared with Kuwait, leaving only a minor fraction directly facing the open waters of the Gulf. Consequently, Iraq is classified as a geographically disadvantaged state under the United Nations Convention on the Law of the Sea (UNCLOS).

== Legal History ==
=== Monarchy Era ===
On November 22, 1957, Prime Minister Ali Jawdat al-Aiyubi issued an official declaration asserting Iraq’s sovereignty and exclusive jurisdiction over all natural resources found within the seabed and subsoil adjacent to its territorial sea. The decree emphasized that this declaration preserved international protocols regarding freedom of navigation and fishing rights.

=== Republican Era ===
Following the transition to a republican system, Iraq codified its domestic maritime framework through Law No. 71 of 1958. Article 2 established the breadth of the territorial sea at 12 nautical miles, measured from the lowest low-water mark along the coast. Article 3 stipulated that any overlapping claims with neighboring states should be resolved in compliance with international law or via bilateral agreements.

Iraq has historically acceded to several key international maritime agreements:

- The Geneva Convention on the International Regime of Maritime Ports (1923): Signed in 1923 and put into effect in 1926, the Kingdom of Iraq ratified the treaty in 1928 under the first ministry of Ja'far al-Askari to guarantee international trade access and equal treatment for ships.
- United Nations Convention on the Law of the Sea (UNCLOS 1982): Ratified during the 1979–1991 administration, specifically adopting Article 11, which permits permanent harbor works to be integrated as outermost components of the coastal baseline framework.

== Maritime Baselines ==
On April 15, 2011, the United Nations formally acknowledged a technical deposition submitted by Iraqi Foreign Minister Hoshyar Zebari to Secretary-General Ban Ki-moon. The document instituted straight baselines calculated using the World Geodetic System (WGS84), subsequently cataloged in the Law of the Sea Bulletin No. 76.

== Etymology and Geography ==
Hamid al-Khatib states, "Several terms have been coined to designate this area, including 'Maritime Belt', 'Territorial Waters', and 'Territorial Sea'. The latter term is perhaps the most prevalent in the modern era, as it appears in most contemporary agreements and was firmly established in the Geneva Convention on the Territorial Sea and the Contiguous Zone."

The Iraqi maritime zone encompasses a total water surface area of 836.83 square kilometers, alongside 146 square kilometers of tidal mudflats. The direct open-sea frontage spans 25 kilometers from the Shatt al-Arab thalweg to the Khor Abdullah thalweg.

The region features irregular tidal channels locally designated by the term Khor (Arabic: خور). Etymologically, the term traces back to the ancient Akkadian words khru or khritu, denoting an excavated canal or watercourse. In regional geography, it defines structural submarine valleys, open coastal lagoons, and shallow marine inlets curving inland from the Gulf.

=== Key Maritime Features ===
- Channels and Inlets (Khors): Khor Abdullah, Khor al-Zubair, Khor al-Amaya, Khor al-Khafqa, Khor Shitanah, Khor al-Sakka, and Khor Bahra.
- Islands: Hajam Island (located within the internal waters).
- Ports and Terminals: Al-Basra Oil Terminal, Khor Al-Amaya Oil Terminal, Grand Faw Port, Umm Qasr Port, and Khor Al-Zubair Port.
- Infrastructure: The Submerged Tunnel (Silk Tunnel) project.
