= Majid al-Nasrawi =

Iraqi politician

Governor Dr Majid al-Nasrawi
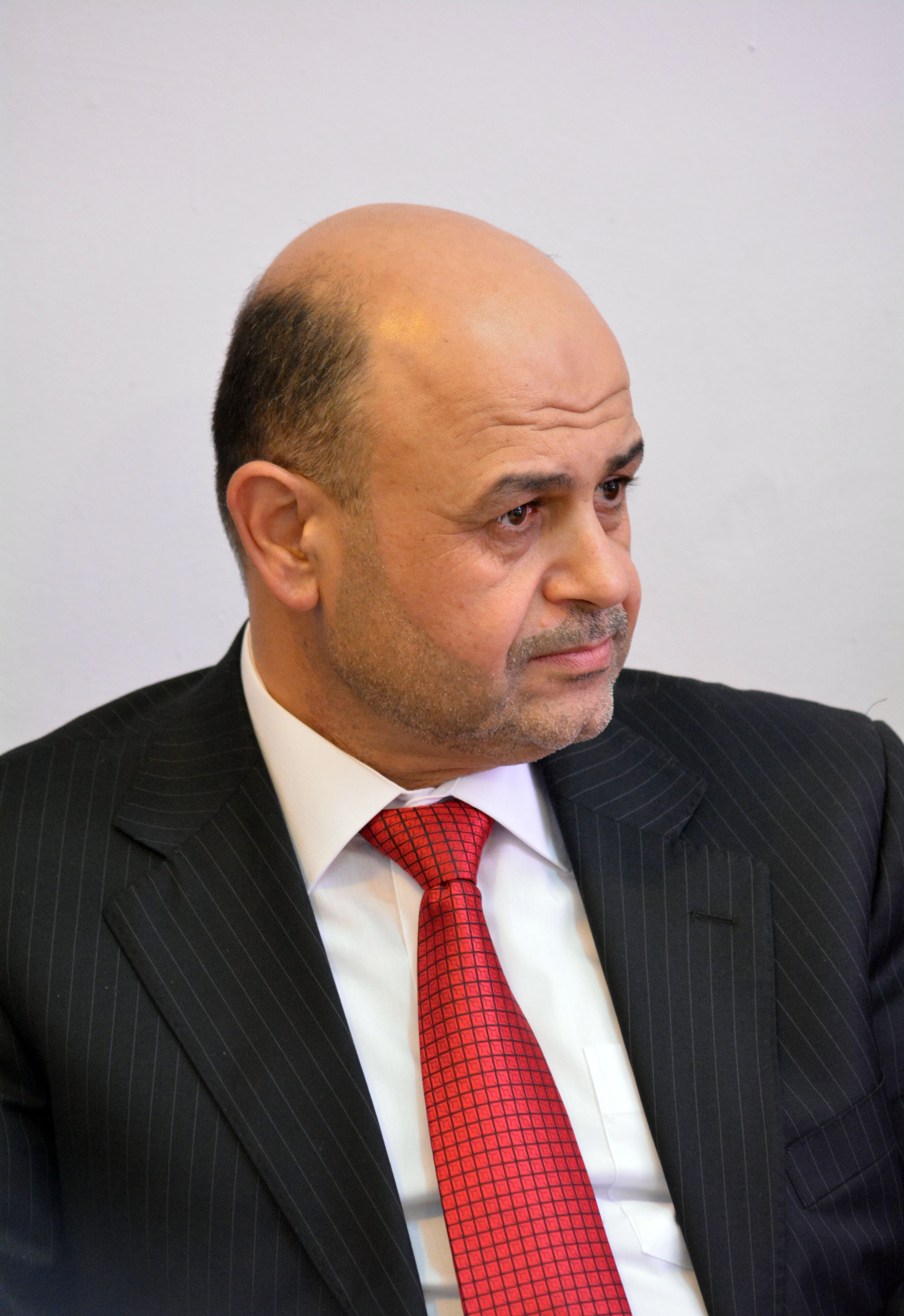
- Al-Nasrawi in 2013

Governor of Basra
- In office 13 June 2013 – 27 August 2017
- Preceded by: Khalaf Abdul Samad
- Succeeded by: Asaad Al Eidani

Personal details
- Born: 1966 (age 59–60) Ma'aqal, Basra, Iraq
- Party: ISCI
- Children: 3
- Education: University of Basrah; Cardiff University; University of Queensland

Majid Mahdi Abd al-Abbass al-Nasrawi (Arabic: ماجد نصراوي; born 1966) is an Iraqi politician who was the Governor of Basra Province from June 2013 to August 2017.

Nasrawi was born in the Ma'aqal area of Basra in 1966. He graduated with a Bachelors in Medicine from the University of Basra, and has also studied medicine at Cardiff University and the University of Queensland.

Nasrawi took over from the previous Governor, Khalaf Abdul Samad, in June 2013 following the 2013 Governorate election where the coalition containing Nasrawi's party, the Islamic Supreme Council of Iraq, came second.
