= 2013 Basra governorate election =

Governorate election in Iraq

2013 Basra Governorate election
- 20 April 2013

All 35 seats for the Basra Governorate council
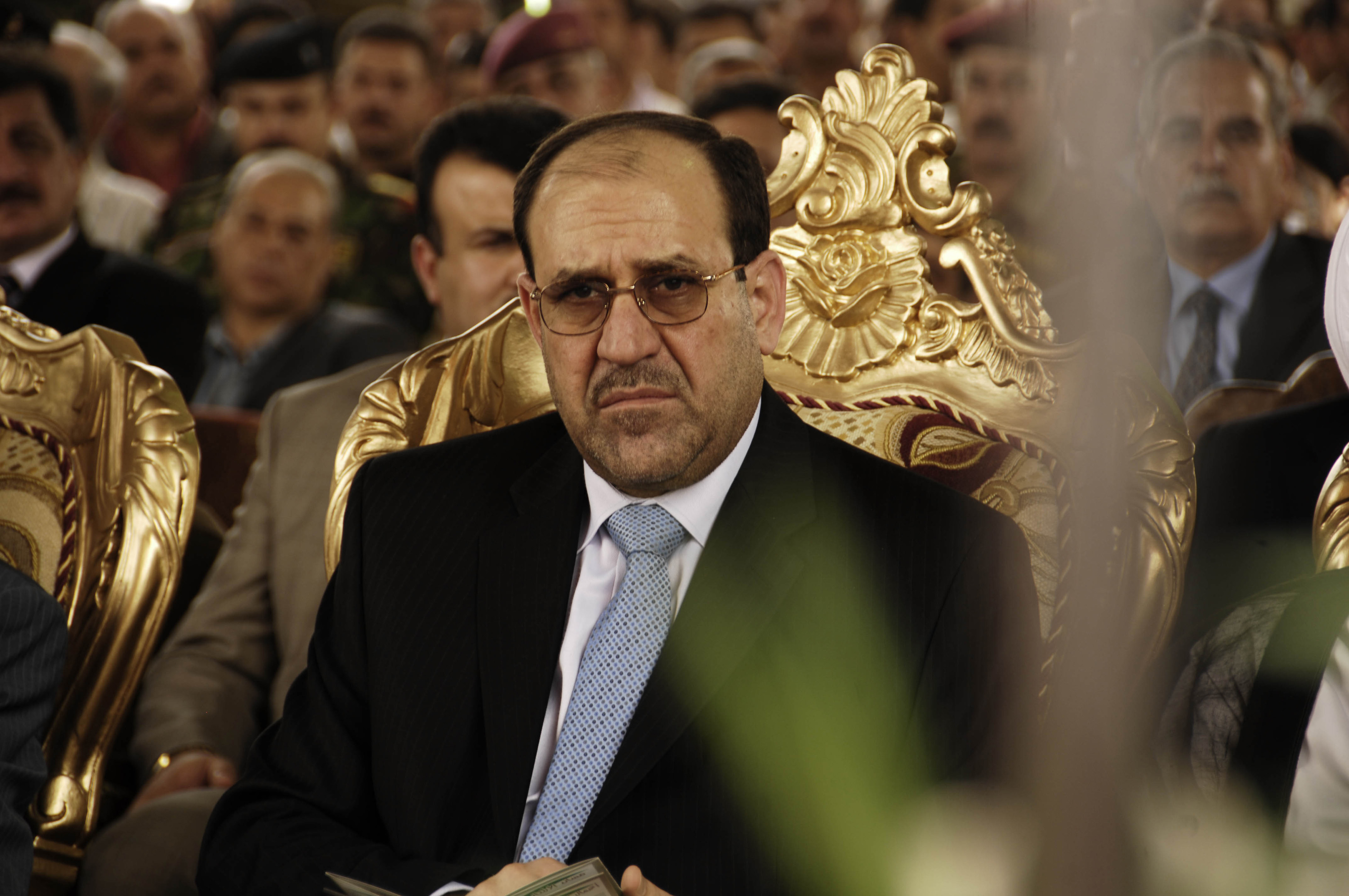
	First party	Third party
Leader	Nouri al-Maliki	Ammar al-Hakim
Party	State of Law	Al-Mehraab Martyr List
Seats won	16	6
	Fourth party
Leader	Muqtada al-Sadr
Party	Sadrist Movement
Seats won	3
Governor of Basra before election
Shitagh Abbud
State of Law
Subsequent Governor
Majid al-Nasrawi
Al-Mehraab Martyr List

The Basra governorate election of 2013 was held on 20 April 2013 alongside elections for all other governorates outside Iraqi Kurdistan, Kirkuk, Anbar, and Nineveh.

== Results ==
Summary of the 20 April 2013 Basra governorate election results
Party/Coalition	Allied national parties	Leader	Seats	Change	Votes	%	±%
State of Law Coalition	Islamic Dawa Party	Nouri Al-Maliki	16	▼4	292,658	45.17%	▲8.18%
Citizens Alliance	ISCI	Ammar al-Hakim	6	▲1	121,875	18.81%	▲7.22%
Liberal Coalition	Liberal Bloc; Tribal Forces Coalition; Sadrist Movement	Dhia Najim al-Asadi	3	▲1	58,312	9.00%	▲4.04%
Basra Independent Coalition	Kafaat al-Iraq; National Fidelity; Loyalty to Najaf; ICICSO		2	▲2	29,384	4.54%	▲4.54%
Gathering of Justice and Unity		al-Faiz	1	▼1	24,513	3.78%	▼0.38%
Al Barsa’s Civil Alliance	Movement for Justice & Development; Democratic Movement; Labour & National Salvation Coalition; People's Party (Iraq); National Meeting; NDP; Iraqi Communist Party	Faiq Al Sheikh Ali	1	▲1	17,541	2.71%	
Alternative Movement			1	▲1	15,643	2.41%	
Islamic Dawa Party – Iraq Organisation			1	▲1	15,493	2.39%	
Will of Iraq Movement			1	▲1	13,940	2.15%	
Al Iraqia National and United Coalition			1	▲1	13,319	2.06%	
Muttahidoon			1	▲1	10,386	1.60%	
National White Bloc					8,247	1.27%	▲1.27%
Al Basra’s People					8,246	1.27%	
New Dawn Bloc					4,115	0.64%	
Iraqi Council for Reform and Change					3,536	0.55%	
Iraq’s Benevolence and Generosity List					2,568	0.40%	
Iraq’s Advocates for State Support					1,782	0.28%	
Islamic Advocates' Party					1,671	0.26%	
Novac Aram Butrosian Abu Mariana	Independent				1,165	0.18%	
Alaa’ Fawzi Kamel Tutunji	Independent				812	0.13%	
Doctor Saad Mitri Botros	Independent				643	0.10%	
Mohammad Al Maryani	Independent				592	0.09%	
Chaldean Syriac Assyrian Popular Council					588	0.09%	
Legal Advisor Sanaa’ Al Asadi	Independent				565	0.09%	
Na’el Ghanem Aziz Hanna	Independent				343	0.05%	
Total			35	-	647,937	100%	
Sources: Musings on Iraq, ISW, IHEC Basra Results, List of political coalition approved for election in provincial councils - IHEC Archived 2015-05-28 at the Wayback Machine, al-Sumaria - Basra Coalitions

== Local government formation ==
On 13 June 2013 Majid al-Nasrawi of the Citizen's Alliance was elected as the new Governor of Basra. Khalaf Abdul Samad, of the State of Law Coalition, was elected as Chairman of the Basra Provincial Council.
