= Duwa, Iraq =

Coordinates: 30°57′N 47°30′E

Al-Basrah in Iraq.

Duwa (دوا ) also known as Ad Dawār is a village of Basrah Governorate in southern Iraq. It is on the east side of the Shatt Al-Arab River and near the Iranian border.

Duwa (الدوار) is located at Latitude 30° 57' 42" N and Longitude 47° 29' 37" E. The topography if flat, the elevation is 4 meters above Sea Level and the climate is arid. The area suffered greatly during the Iran–Iraq War, during which it was a major battlefield, and again after the 1991 Iraqi uprising.
