= Shomalī, Iraq =

Coordinates: 30°56′N 47°30′E

Shamli or Shāmlī (الشوملي) is a town of Basrah Governorate in southern Iraq, northeast of Shahbāzīyah, northwest of Chalabīyah and south of Ad Dawār.

Shāmlī has an elevation of 5 metres, and is on the east bank of the Shatt Al-Arab River at 30° 56' 21" north, 47° 29' 32" east.
