= Hamrin oil field =

Oilfield in Basra Governorate, Iraq

Hamrin
- Country: Iraq
- Region: Basra Governorate
- Offshore/onshore: onshore
- Operator: Basrah Oil Company

Field history
- Discovery: 1950
- Start of production: 1980

Production
- Estimated oil in place: 423 million tonnes (~ 500×10^{6} m^{3} or 3000 million bbl)

The Hamrin oil field is an oil field located in Basra Governorate. It was discovered in 1950 and developed by Basrah Oil Company. It began production in 1960 and produces oil. The total proven reserves of the Hamrin oil field are around 3 billion barrels (480,000,000 m^{3}), and production will be centered on 60,000 barrels per day (9,500 m^{3}/d).
