= Basrah District =

Basrah District قضاء البصرة
- District
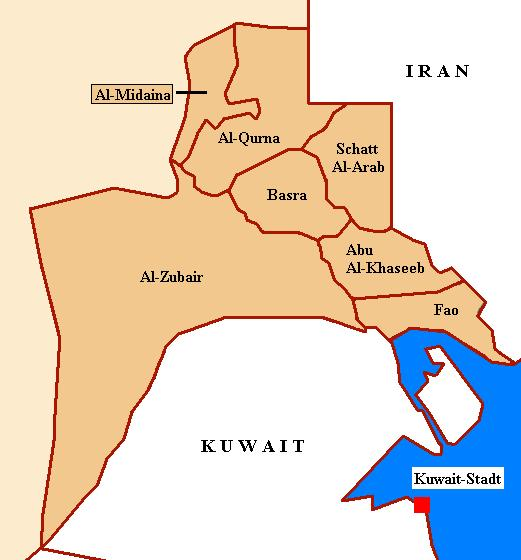
- Districts of Basra Province
- Interactive map of Basrah District
- Country: Iraq
- Governorates: Basra Governorate
- Seat: Basrah

Population (2024)
  - Total: 1,337,707
- Time zone: UTC+3 (AST)

Basrah District (Arabic: قضاء البصرة) is a district of Basra Governorate, Iraq.
