= Abu Al-Khaseeb District =

Abu Al-Khaseeb District قضاء أبي الخصيب
- District
- Interactive map of Abu Al-Khaseeb District
- Coordinates: 30°15′0″N 48°6′0″E
- Country: Iraq
- Governorates: Basra Governorate
- Seat: Abu Al-Khaseeb

Population (2024)
  - Total: 394,716
- Time zone: UTC+3 (AST)

Abu Al-Khaseeb District (Arabic: قضاء أبي الخصيب) is a district of the Basra Governorate, Iraq. Its seat is the town of Abu Al-Khaseeb. It got its name from Abu al-Khasib canal, which was excavated by and named after a client of the 8th-century Abbasid caliph, Abu al-Khaṣīb Marzuq.
