= Shatt Al-Arab District =

Shatt Al-Arab District Arabic: شط العرب
- District
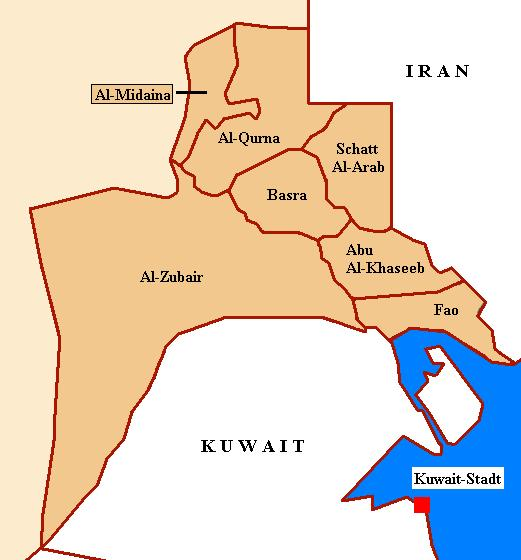
- Districts of Basra Governorate
- Interactive map of Shatt Al-Arab District
- Coordinates: 30°45′35″N 47°52′30″E
- Country: Iraq
- Governorate: Basra
- Seat: Al-Harita

Area
  - Total: 2,050 km^{2} (790 sq mi)

Population (2018)
  - Total: 174,373
  - Density: 85.1/km^{2} (220/sq mi)
- Time zone: UTC+3 (AST)

Shatt Al-Arab District (Arabic: شط العرب) is a district of Basra Governorate, Iraq. Its seat is the City of Al-Harita (Arabic: الهارثة).
