= Ashur Mall =

- ܡܳܐܢܨܶܢܥܳܐ (Syriac) عاشور مول (Arabic)
- Location: Mosul, Iraq
- Opened: 31 December 2024
- Floor area: 17,000 sqm
- Floors: 3

Ashur Mall (Syriac: ܡܳܐܢܨܶܢܥܳܐ, Arabic: عاشور مول), also known as Ashur Land Mall (Arabic: عاشور لاند مول, Syriac: ܡܳܐܢܨܽܘܪܝܐܳܐ ܕ݂ܩܽܘܝܳܡܳܐ) is a shopping under construction in of Mosul, Iraq. It is one of the largest shopping malls in Iraq. It is located near the Presidential Site of Saddam Hussein on Forest Street opposite the Tourist Island of Mosul in Sudair region. The mall is noted for its Syriac–Assyrian architecture.

== History ==
On 13 November 2024, buses were launched from the mall to support the Iraq national football team.

== Features ==
Ashur Mall consists of 3 floors. It covers 17,000 square metres (4.2 acres). The mall includes more than 100 shops and a hypermarket. It is surrounded by walls and gates in the Assyrian style. Initially, 25 shops opened. The area also offers a private parking lot, fountains, and green spaces. Ard Farah City Hall and Games Hall attract student trips.

The architectural features of the mall include Lamassu statues and Syriac–Assyrian murals. A large gate is similar to the entrances of ancient Assyrian cities. It is home to the first hybrid market in Mosul.

== See also ==
- Baghdad Mall
