= Artawi oil field =

Oilfield in Basra Governorate, Iraq

Ratawi
- Location within Iraq
- Country: Iraq
- Region: Basra Governorate
- Offshore/onshore: onshore
- Coordinates: 30.4833°N 47.15°E
- Operator: Basrah Oil Company

Field history
- Discovery: 1950
- Start of production: 2018

Production
- Current production of gas: 8.6×10^{6} m^{3}/d 300×10^{6} cu ft/d 3×10^{9} m^{3}/a (110×10^{9} cu ft/a)
- Estimated oil in place: 1408 million tonnes (~ 2×10^{9} m^{3} or 10000 million bbl)
- Estimated gas in place: 50×10^{9} m^{3} 1.75×10^{12} cu ft

The Artawi oil field is an oil field located in Basra Governorate. It was discovered in 1950 and developed by Basrah Oil Company. It will begin production in 2018 and will produce oil. The total proven reserves of the Ratawi oil field are around 10 billion barrels (1.6×10^{9} m^{3}), and production will be centered on 250,000 barrels per day (40,000 m^{3}/d).

In January 2025, French energy giant TotalEnergies announced that they were building a plant to process gas that was flared off from the Ratawi field.
