= Asaad Al Eidani =

Iraqi politician

Governor Asaad Al Eidani
- أسعد العيداني

Governor of Basra
- Incumbent
- Assumed office 27 August 2017
- Preceded by: Majid al-Nasrawi

Personal details
- Born: January 1, 1967 (age 59) Basra, Iraq
- Party: Iraqi National Congress
- Education: University of Basrah College of Engineering

Asaad Abdulameer Al Eidani (Arabic: أسعد عبد الأمير العيداني; born 1 January 1967) is an Iraqi politician and businessman who has been the Governor of Basra Province since August 2017. He is also deputy secretary-general of the Iraqi National Congress Party.

== The Governor of Basra ==
Mid-2017, Basra witnessed large protests against the former governor, Majid Al-Nasrawi, following accusations of corruption, wasting public money and lack of services. The result was the former governor fleeing to Iran and then to Australia, which left the governor's office vacant. That led the Basra Council to hold an emergency meeting to choose a new governor for Basra, the result of which was that the politician and businessman Asaad Al-Eidani obtained the majority of the votes and was sworn in as governor of Basra before the judicial authority. He has been holding the office since August 2017.

== Establishing the Tasmeem alliance ==
In 2021 Al Eidani worked with another Basrawi politician Sheikh Amer Al-Fayez to establish a local political alliance called the Tasmeem Alliance and participated in the 2021 Iraqi parliamentary elections. The Tasmeem Alliance won five MP seats in Basra Governorate.
