= Baghdad Mall =

- بغداد مول

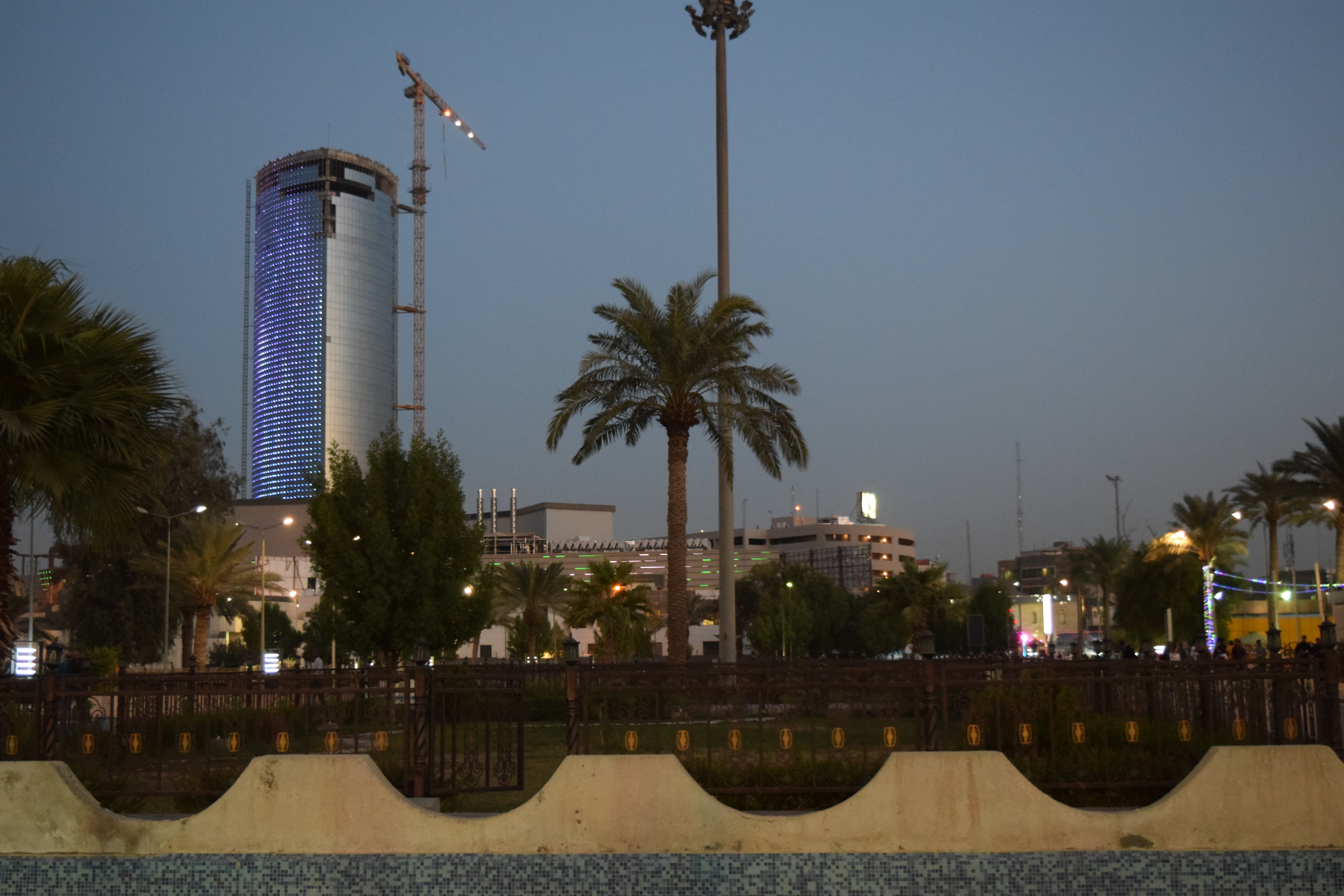
- Location: Harthiya, Baghdad; Iraq
- Coordinates: 33°18′43″N 44°21′53″E
- Address: Baghdad Mall, Al Harthiyah, Baghdad, Iraq. 133983
- Opened: August 28, 2017
- Developer: Tefirom Group
- Architect: Dore Architects
- Floors: 4 (shopping mall); 32 (hotel)
- Parking: 1000+
- Website: official-baghdad.business.site

Baghdad Mall (Arabic: بغداد مول) is a multi-purpose building consisting of a shopping mall, a hotel and a medical centre in Baghdad, Iraq. Located in Harthiya, at the intersection between the Damascus street and Al-Kindi street, it is one of the largest shopping malls in Baghdad. The multi-level shopping mall currently features over one hundred retail outlets, a thousand parking spaces, and contains dozens of restaurants and cafés.

Baghdad Mall opened on August 28, 2017, taking 3 years to complete. The event was of symbolic value as part of the reconstruction efforts by the government of Prime Minister Haider al-Abadi, who personally attended the opening ceremony. The ceremony was co-hosted by Iraqi poet Shahad al-Shamary, and the ceremony featured musical guests such as Dalli, Hussam al-Rassam, Diana Karazon, and Hussein el-Deik.

== Description ==
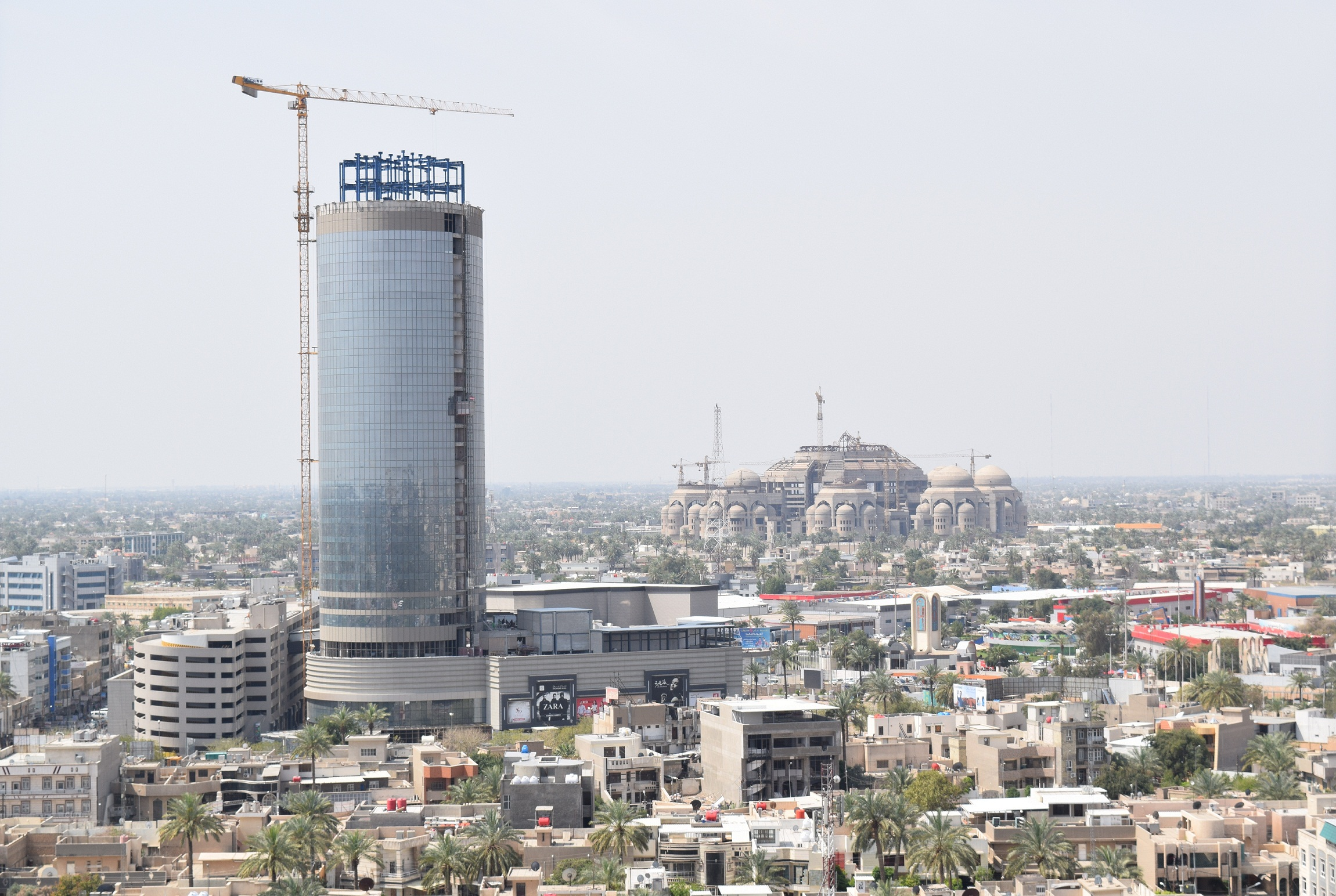
Baghdad Mall under construction (2017)

The mall is over 80,000 square metres (860,000 sq ft), featuring 32 floors including a 250-room luxury hotel as well as a medical center with 30 specialized clinics.

=== Shopping mall ===
The shopping center Baghdad Mall occupies an area of 36,000 square metres (390,000 sq ft) on four floors. It contains more than 100 stores and hypermarkets, Red Tag, Luvian and a store carrying the LC Waikiki clothing brand.

=== Rayhaan Rotana Hotel ===
Called as Al-Harithiya Tower in Iraqi circles. The hotel, which Rotana Hotels Company manages. It occupies 32 floors and containing 241 rooms, at a height of 120 meters above sea level, private suites, conference halls, and a sports hall. The hotel's official name is Rayhaan Rotana and is part of the Rotana Hotel Management.

=== Dublin Health Medical Center ===
Managed by Dublin Health Services, the medical center includes 30 specialized clinics.

=== Parking lot ===
It is the largest parking building in Iraq, as it can accommodate approximately 1,000 cars distributed over 10 floors, where valet parking, ticketing, and car locating services are available. The parking building was designed to serve the project's multiple facilities, namely Baghdad Mall, Baghdad Rotana, the hospital, as well as specialized clinics, and can be accessed from all floors. The parking building uses the latest modern technologies, including a parking guidance system with adaptive lighting, sensors and LED parking indicators, an indoor GPS system with a QR code, and mobile payment services.

== Trivia ==
There was a fan meeting event for YouTuber and Iraqi beauty expert Noor Stars, who came to Baghdad after they were residing in the United States and organized a meeting with fans in the front courtyard of Baghdad Mall on Friday, September 29, 2017, from 6 to 8 P.M, 125 winners were chosen to receive prizes presented by Several cosmetic stores. The event was sponsored by Escada lenses, Milani products, and Vanilla stores. Susan Soleimani was the emcee of the ceremony. The gathering opened with a piece by oud player Professor Mustafa Saleh at the College of Fine Arts. According to an official statement from Baghdad Mall, this event achieved the highest attendance in Baghdad Mall, which exceeded more than 51,000 thousand people.

== See also ==
- Ashur Mall
