= Architecture of Iraq =

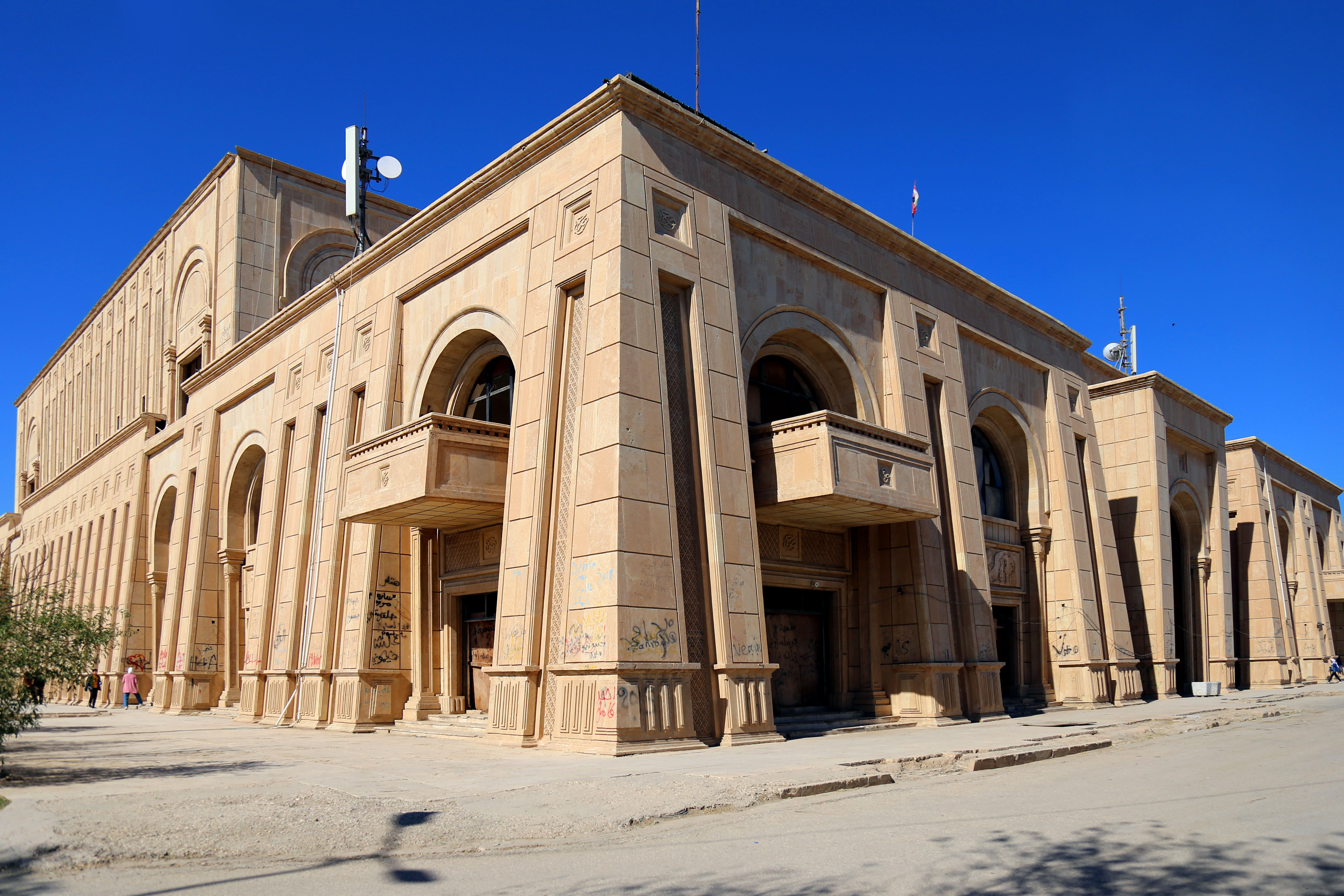
Saddam Hussein's Palace in Hillah

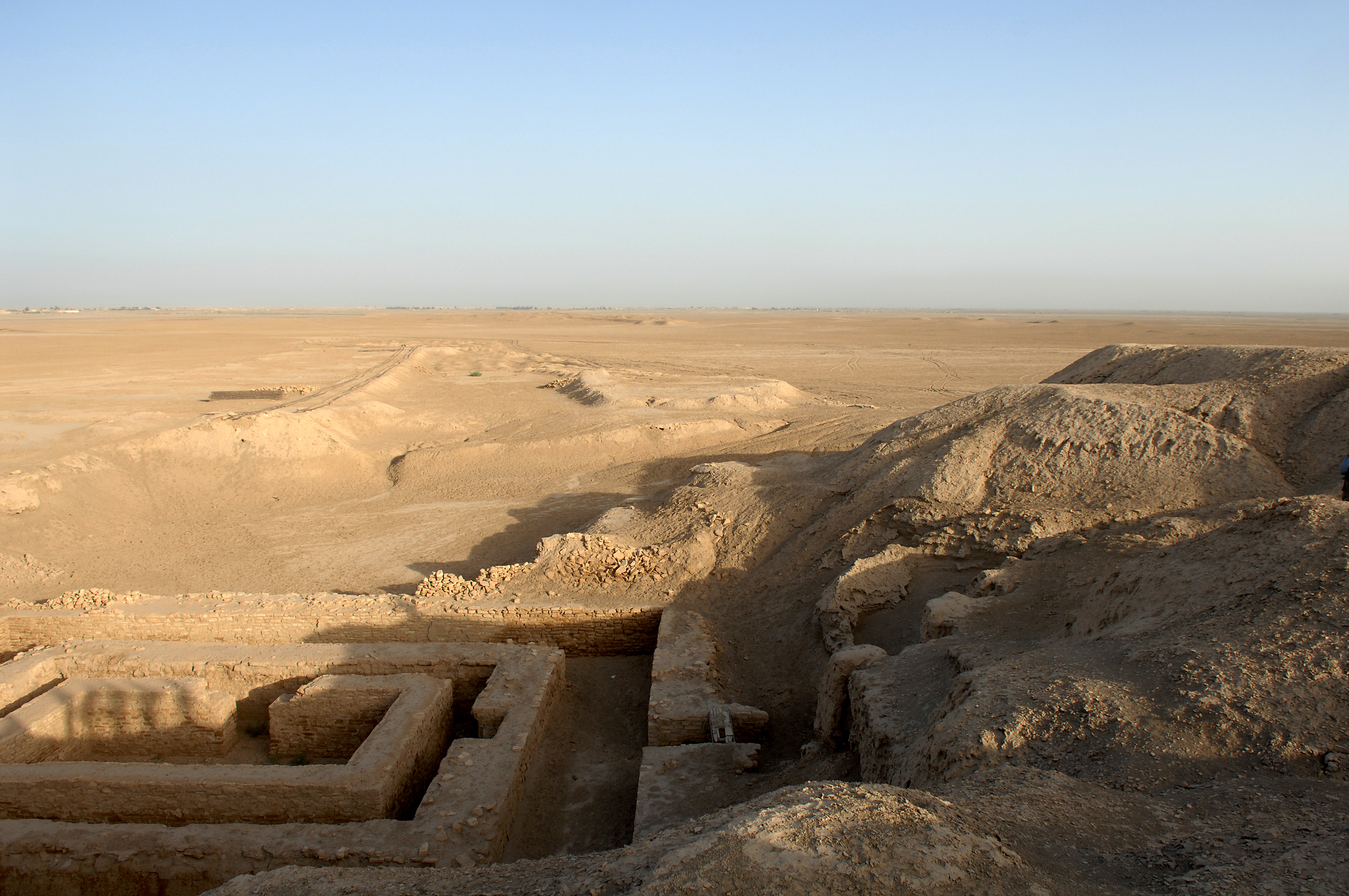
Uruk

The architecture of Iraq encompasses the buildings of various architectural styles that exist in Iraq. Iraq is recognized by UNESCO as being the cradle of civilization.

== Islamic ==
=== Early Islamic period ===
After the conquest of Iraq by the new Arab Muslims in the 630s. Iraq was an important province of the new empire. Under the first caliphs, buildings and mosques were built. The city of Basra was founded by caliph Umar. Kufa was also founded by Umar and given its name in 637–638 CE, about the same time as Basra.

The Umayyad Caliphate was established in 661, when Caliph Hasan abdicated to Mu'awiya ibn Abi Sufyan, founder of the Umayyad dynasty. Under the Umayyads, the Arab empire continued to expand. The Umayyads built new cities, often unfortified military camps that provided bases for further conquests. In Iraq, Wasit was the most important of these and included a square Friday mosque with a hypostyle design.

=== Abbasid period ===
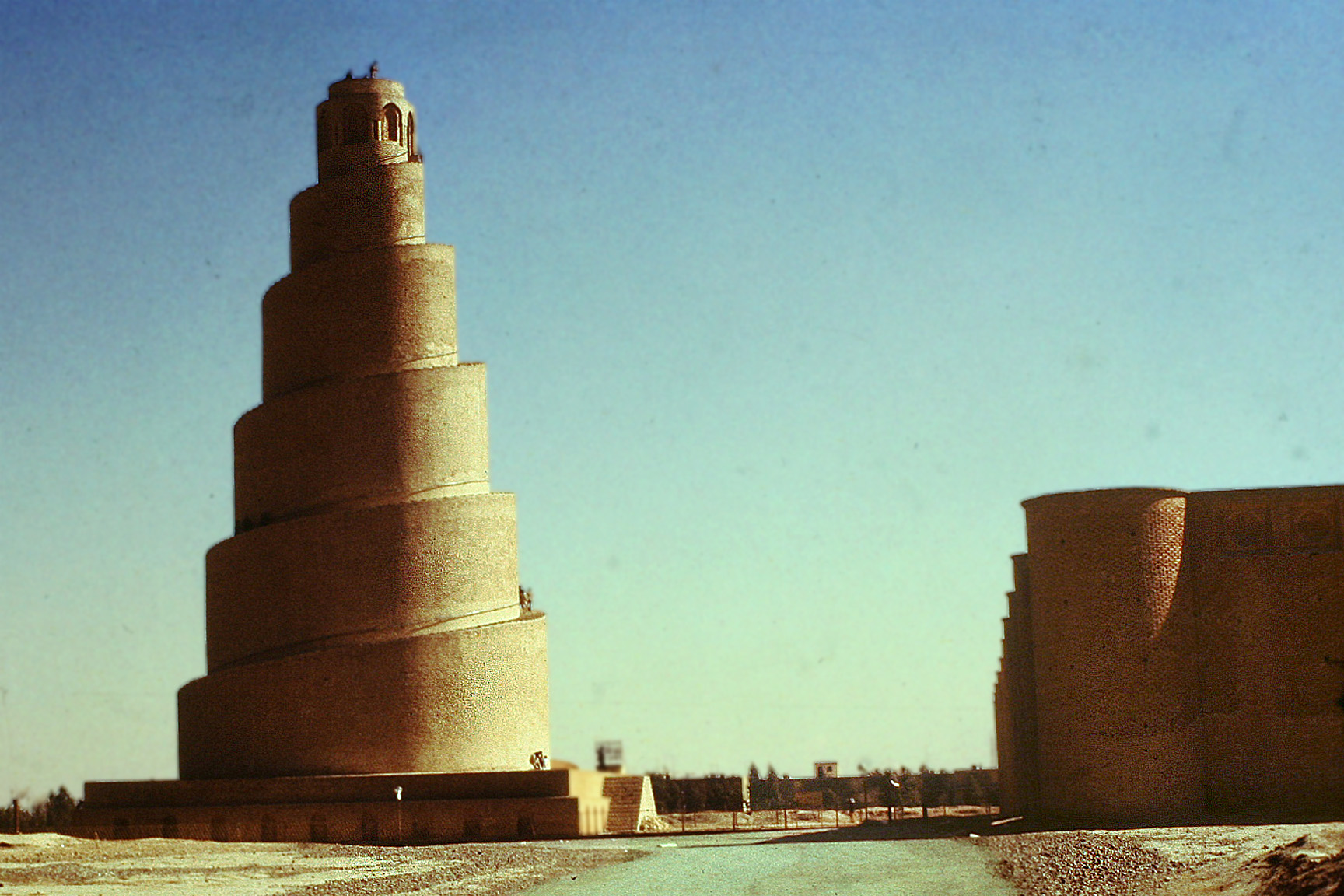
The spiral minaret of the Great Mosque of Samarra

In 750, the Umayyad Caliphate was overthrown and replaced by the Abbasid Caliphate. In the mid 8th century, the Round City of Baghdad was founded as the Abbasid capital, following the Abbasid victory over the Umayyad caliphate. While the Umayyads had typically reused pre-Islamic buildings in the cities they had conquered, by the Abbasid era many of these structures required replacement. Abbasids founded many cities throughout the Empire. In 836 Samarra was founded. The core area of the city was initially constructed in the reign of al-Mu'tasim, with further development taking place under al-Wathiq and al-Mutawakkil.

=== Ottoman period ===
The Al-Wazeer Mosque and Al-Maqam Mosque are examples of Ottoman architecture in Iraq. One important architectural activity during this period was the expansion and renovation of the primarily Shi'a shrines in Karbala, Najaf, Kadhimiya, and Samarra. These works were largely sponsored by the Shi'a Safavid dynasty (who controlled Iraq for short periods during this era) and thus the new constructions largely followed an Iranian or Safavid style.

== Modern ==
=== Kingdom of Iraq ===
In the 1950s, as Iraq became wealthier due to oil revenue during the reign of King Faisal II, several important projects were commissioned. Numerous foreign architects, including Walter Groupius and Le Corbusier were invited to Iraq to design various public buildings during this period. Among these was American architect Frank Lloyd Wright, who drew up the Plan for Greater Baghdad, which would include a cultural center, opera house, and university on the outskirts of Baghdad. However, it was never built due to the collapse of the monarchy in 1958.

=== Post 1958 ===
During his tenure as President, Saddam Hussein oversaw the construction of several monuments and palaces, including the Victory Arch and al Faw Palace. Many of these have been described as tacky, and unrepresentative of actual Iraqi architectural tradition.

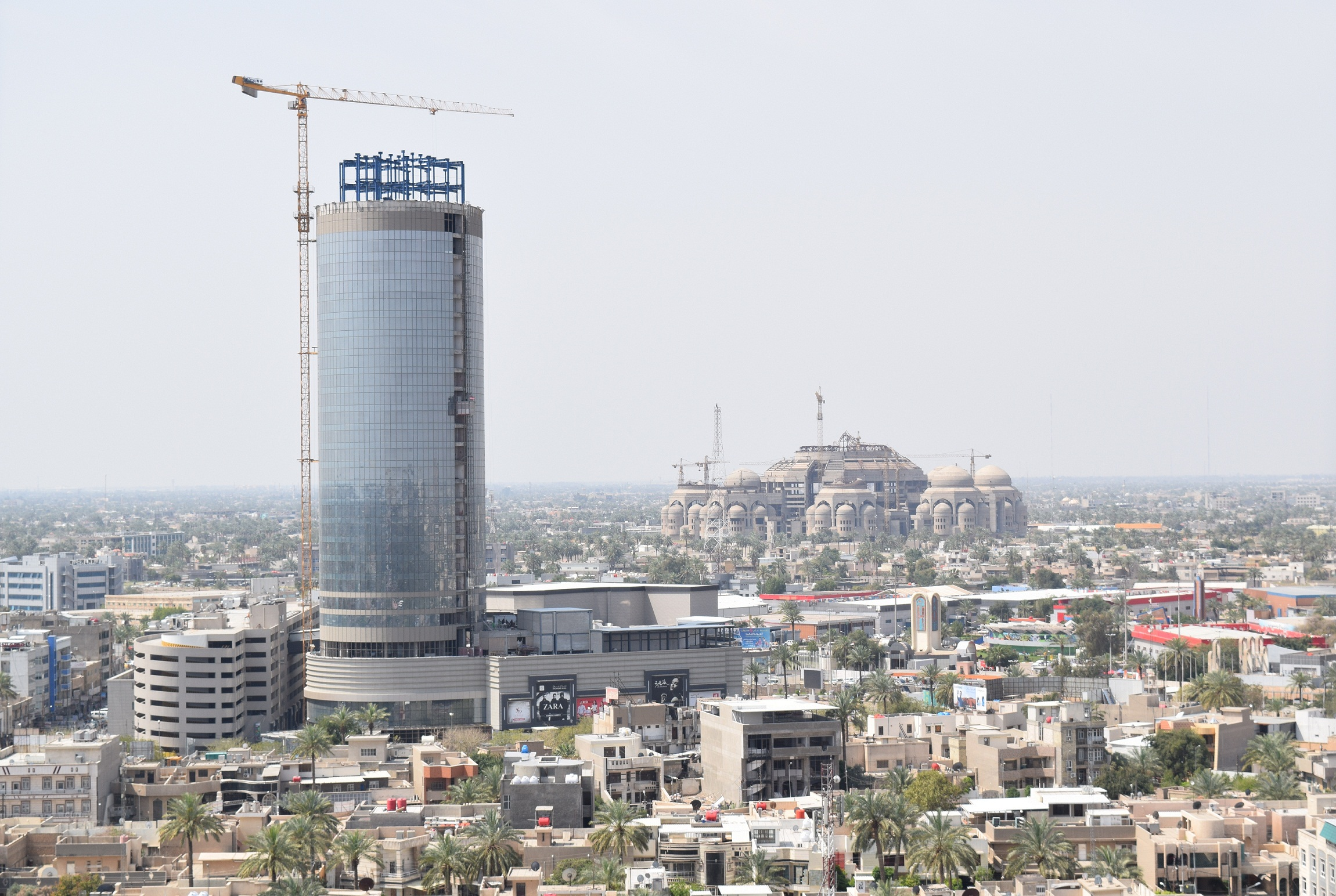
Baghdad Mall and Rotana Hotel

Al Ma'amoun Communication Tower

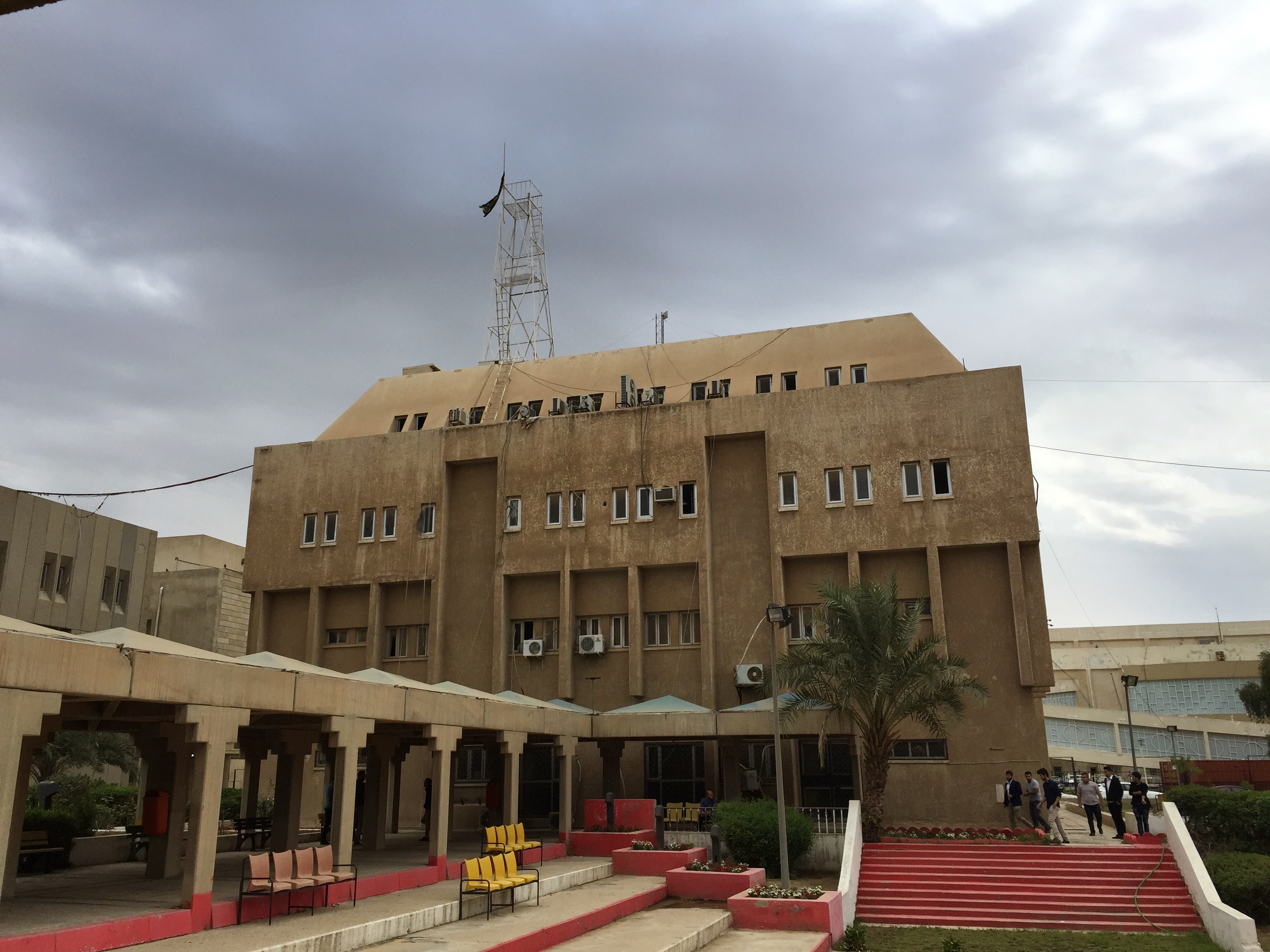
Al-Hebnaa

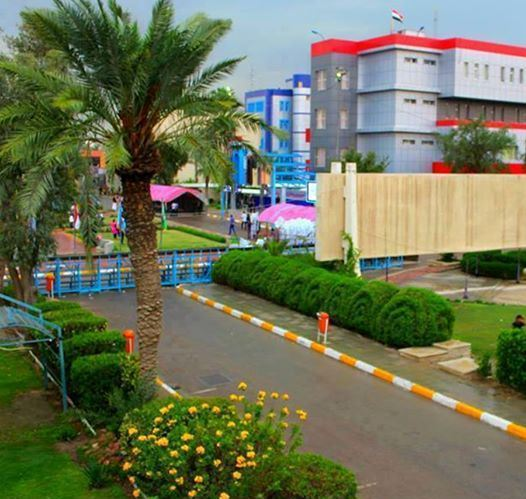
University of Technology — Baghdad

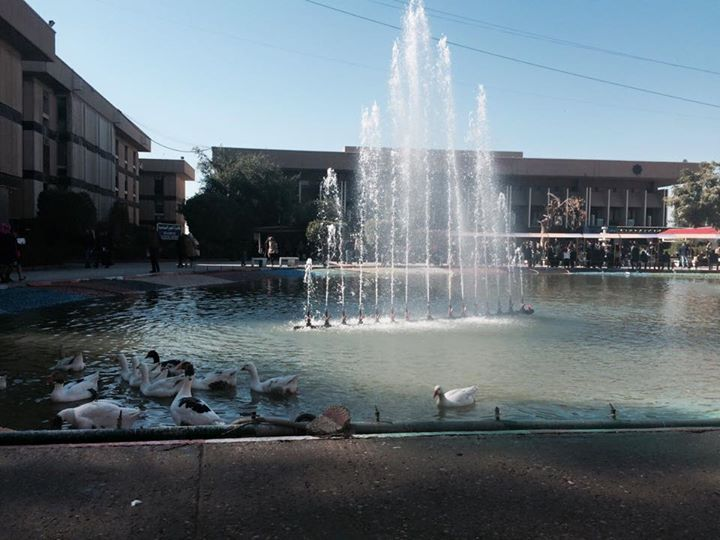
A university in Baghdad

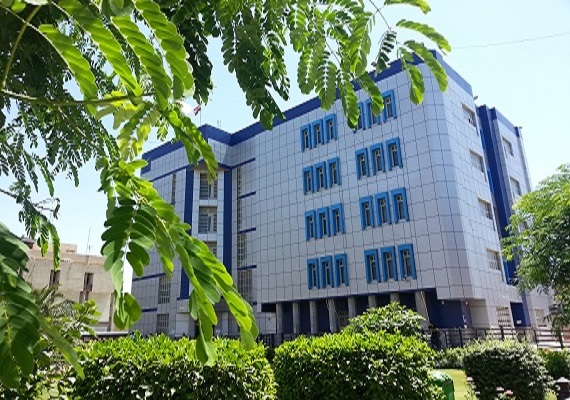
Laboratory in Baghdad

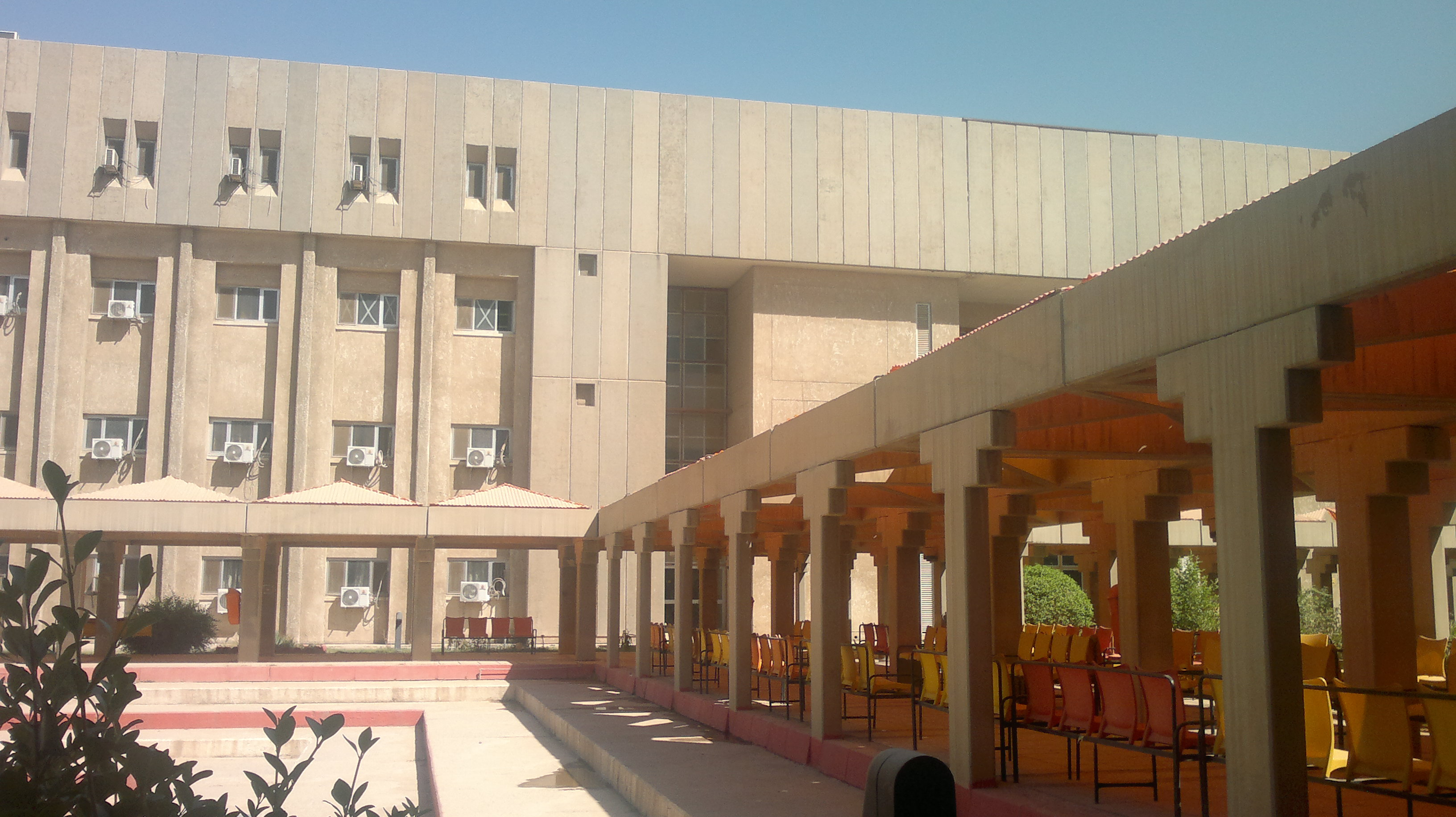
Nahrain University
