= Al-Faw District, Basra Governorate =

District in Iraq

Coordinates: 30.09346°N 48.21259°E

Al-Faw District Arabic: قضاء الفاو
- District
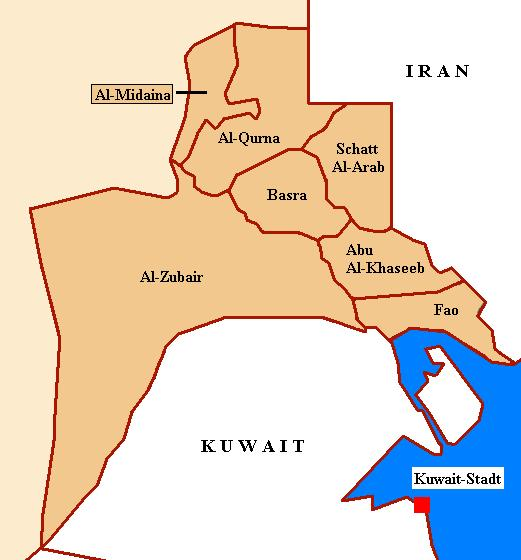
- Districts of Basra Province
- Interactive map of Al-Faw District
- Country: Iraq
- Governorates: Basra Governorate
- Seat: Al-Faw

Population (2024)
  - Total: 45,388
- Time zone: UTC+3 (AST)

Al-Faw District (Arabic: قضاء الفاو) is a district of the Basra Governorate in Iraq, bordering the Persian Gulf and the country of Kuwait. No oil fields are in the Faw district but the Iraq strategic pipeline runs through the area.
