= Abu Al-Khaseeb =

Abu Al-Khaseeb أبو الخصيب
- Location within Iraq
- Coordinates: 30°26′28″N 47°58′21″E
- Country: Iraq
- Governorate: Basra
- District: Abu Al-Khaseeb
- Date of establishment: 1873

Population (2024 census)
  - Total: 357,771
- Time zone: UTC+3 (AST)
- Postal code: 61006
- Area code: 01

Abu Al-Khaseeb (sometimes spelled Abu Al-Khasib) is a town in Abu Al-Khaseeb District, Basra Governorate, southern Iraq. Its name translates to "an rich area, or an area of abundance", referring to the fertile Shatt Al-Arab river. It is an agricultural town, well known for its date palm farms on the river. Its population is predominantly Shia Arab. Abu Al-Khaseeb has long been a traditional center for boat-building of the mashoof canoes that are widely used by the Marsh Arabs.

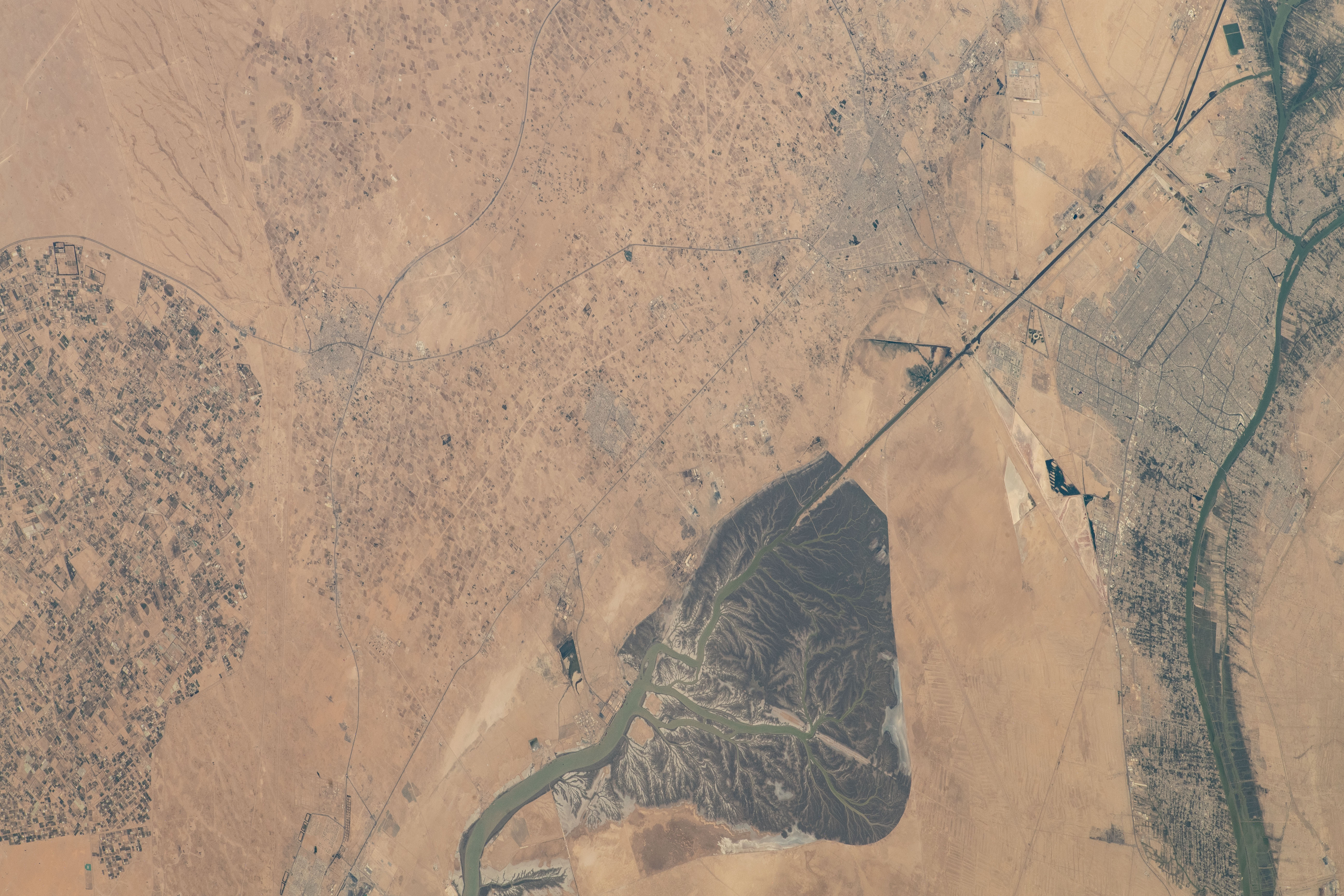
Khor Al Zubair Wetlands, Abu Al-Khaseeb, Shatt al-Arab
