= Basra Governorate =

Governorate of Iraq

Basra Governorate محافظة البصرة Basra Province
- Governorate
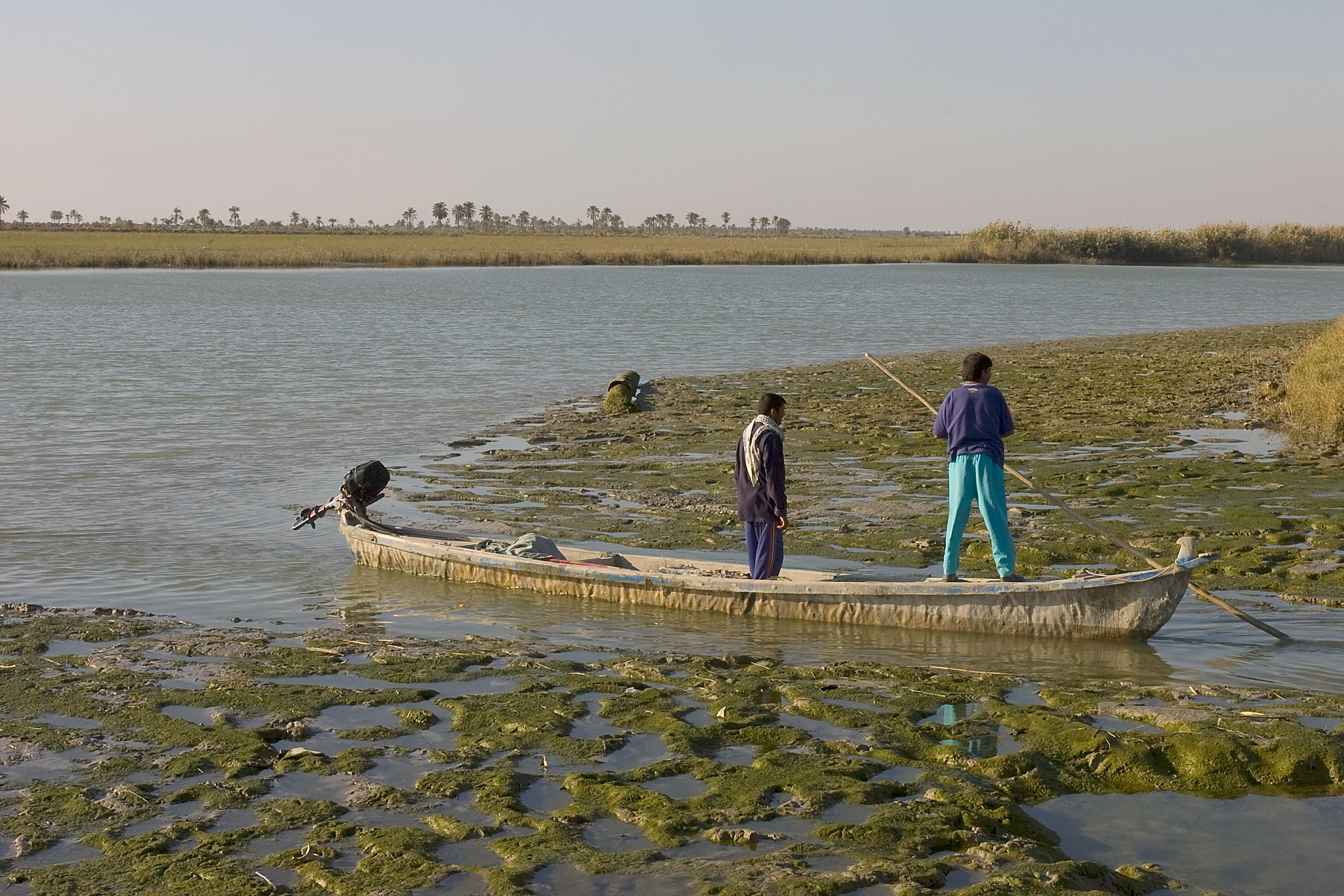
- Iraqi fishermen in Basra, 2008

- Seal

- Coordinates: 30°22′N 47°22′E
- Country: Iraq
- Capital: Basra

Government
  - Governor: Asaad Al Eidani

Area
  - Total: 19,070 km^{2} (7,360 sq mi)

Population (2024 Census)
  - Total: 3,664,168
  - Rank: 3
- ISO 3166 code: IQ-BA
- HDI (2024): 0.689 medium · 15th of 18
- Website: basra.gov.iq

The Basra Governorate (Arabic: محافظة البصرة Muḥāfaẓa al-Baṣra), also called Basra Province, is a governorate in southern Iraq bordering Kuwait to the south and Iran to the east. The capital is the city of Basra, located in the Basrah district. Other districts of Basra include Al-Qurna, Al-Zubair, Al-Midaina, Shatt Al-Arab, Abu Al-Khaseeb and Al-Faw located on the Persian Gulf. It is the only governorate with a coastline.

== History ==
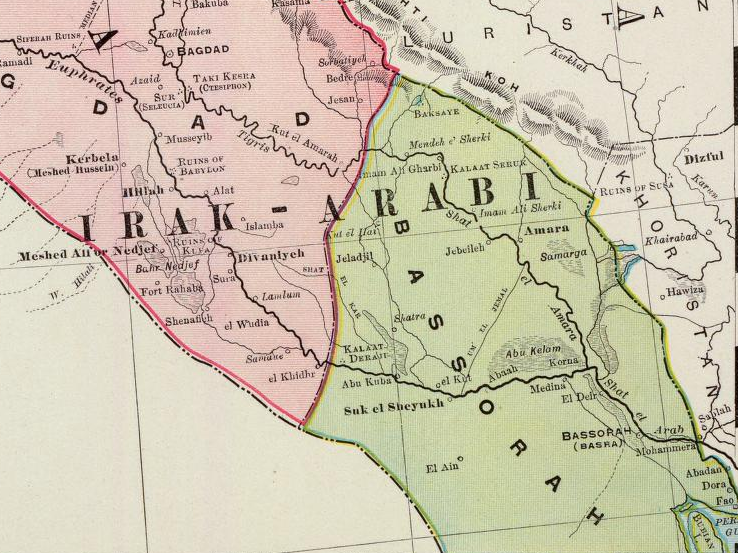
Basra (Bassorah) Vilayet in 1897

In 1920, after the defeat of the Ottoman Empire in World War I, the United Kingdom took over the former Ottoman vilayets of Basra, Baghdad and Mosul which had together formed the historical region of Irak Arabi or Irak Babeli, and called it the British Mandate of Mesopotamia or Mandatory Iraq. The mandate was succeeded by the Kingdom of Iraq in 1932.

The local Shiite population suffered long and hard under Saddam's rule. The city of Basra had suffered considerably during the eight-year war with Iran and Allied bombardment and in 1991 during the Gulf War, the governorate ventured into an uprising after the United States promised them aid. It was started in Basra by angry soldiers, according to popular legend after they fired at a giant public portrait of Saddam Hussein. Mass support on the streets followed, shouting slogans, executing Ba'ath party members, leaders and secret police, and destroying pictures and monuments of Saddam Hussein. The participants had expected support from American troops. but the Allied army at the time was occupied despite the 24th Infantry Division stationed only several miles from the city in Kuwait. The city of Basra did not completely succumb to the rebels; a counterattack by some 6,000 loyalists from the Republican Guard held out against 5,000 defectors of the Iraqi army. After about three days, the Republican Guard began to gain control, destroying "everything in front of them", killing many of the rebels in the streets and conducting mass executions on the public squares.

From 2003 the governorate was one of the centres of warfare during the initial invasion of the British and Americans during the Iraq War. The Battle of Basra took place between March 23 and April 7 between the British 1st Armoured Division forces under Major General Robin Brims, and Iraqi forces under General Ali Hassan al-Majid (Chemical Ali). The battle resulted in the capture and occupation of Basra by British forces. Much of the heaviest combat in the war took place in the province in subsequent weeks. Several outbreaks of violence between secular Iraqis and radical Shiite Muslims broke out in summer 2006, and in September 2007, British troops were withdrawn to Basra Airport, and withdrew entirely from the city in December 2007. Following the example of the Kurdistan Autonomous Region in northern Iraq, Basra has proposed uniting with the other provinces of Dhi Qar and Maysan as an autonomous region. On October 15, 2005, 691,024 people, some 96.02%, voted for the new constitution.

During the Gulf War, part of Kuwait became a part of the Basra Governorate and was given the name Saddamiyat al-Mitla' District.

== Demographics ==
Historical population
Year	Pop.	±% p.a.
1977	1,008,600	—
1987	872,176	−1.44%
1997	1,556,445	+5.96%
2009	2,405,434	+3.69%
2024	3,664,168	+2.85%
Source: Citypopulation

== Economy ==
- Artawi oil field
- Hamrin oil field

== Government ==
- Governor: Asaad Al Eidani
- Deputy Governor: Mohammed Tahir
- Provincial Council Chairman (PCC): Sabah Al Bazooni

== Districts ==
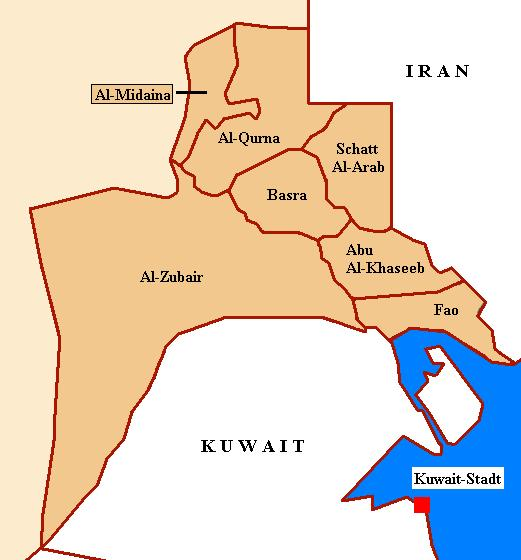
Districts of Basra Governorate

- Abu Al-Khaseeb
- Basra
- Al-diyr
- Al-Faw
- Al-Midaina
- Al-Qurna
- Shatt Al-Arab
- Al-Zubair

== See also ==
- Cradle of civilization
- Sumer
