= List of places in Iraq =

This is a list of places in Iraq. Governorates of Iraq lists the governorates, and Districts of Iraq lists the subdivisions of those governorates.

== Modern cities and towns ==
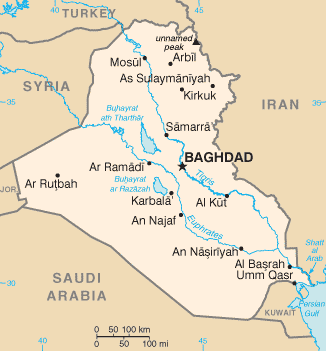
Iraq Map

- Afak (عفك)
- Samarra
- Al `Awja (العوجا)
- Baghdad (ܒܓܕܐܕ) (بغداد)
  - Kadhimiya(الكاظمية)
  - Sadr City (مدينة الصدر)
  - Green Zone (المنطقة الخضراء)
  - List of neighborhoods and districts in Baghdad
- Baghdadi
- Bayji (بيجي)
- Balad (بلد)
- Ba`qubah (بعقوبه)
- Al Basrah (Basra) (البصرة)
- Ad Dawr (الداور)
- Dihok (دهوك / ܢܘܗܕܪܐ)
- Ad Diwaniyah (الديوانية)
- Erbil or Hewlêr (ܐܪܒܝܠ) (أربيل)
- Al Fallujah (الفلّوجة)
- Hadithah (حديثة)
- Haqlaniyah
- Halabjah (حلبجة)
- Al Hillah (الحلة)
- Hit(هيت)
- Al Iskandariyah (إسكندرية)
- Karbala (كربلاء)
- Karma
- Khanaqin (خانقين)
- Kirkuk (ܟܪܟܘܟ) (كركوك)
- Al Kut (الكوت)
- Al Miqdadiyah (المقدادية)
- Mosul (الموصل) (Ninawa ܢܝܢܘܐ)
- An Najaf (النجف)
- An Nasiriyah (الناصرية)
- Al-Qa'im (القائم)
- As Samawah (السماوه)
- Samarra (سامراء)
- Al-Shamia (الشامية)
- Ar Ramadi (الرمادي)
- Ar Rutbah (الرطبة)
- As Sulaymaniyah (السليمانية)
- At Taji (Tadji)(التاجي)
- Tall `Afar (تل عفر)
- Tall Kayf (تل كيف) (ܬܠ ܟܦܐ)
- Tikrit (تكريت)
- Umm Qasr (أم قصر)
- Zakho (زاخو) (ܙܵܟ̣ܘ̇)
- Al-Qurnah (القرنة)
- Az Zubair
- Al-Faw (الفاو)
- Al Zab

== Ancient cities and important ruins ==
- Babylon (ܒܒܝܠ) (بابل)
- Ctesiphon (Al-Mada'in, المدائن)
- Eridu (إريدو)
- Hatra (حضر)
- Kish (كيش)
- Lagash (لجش)
- Nineveh (ܢܝܢܘܐ) (نينوى)
- Nippur (نيبور)
- Nuzi (Nuzu)
- Shenna (Sinn Barimma)
- Sumer (سومر)
- Tell Ubaid (تل عبيد)
- Ur (أور)
- Uruk (أوروك)

== Holy sites ==
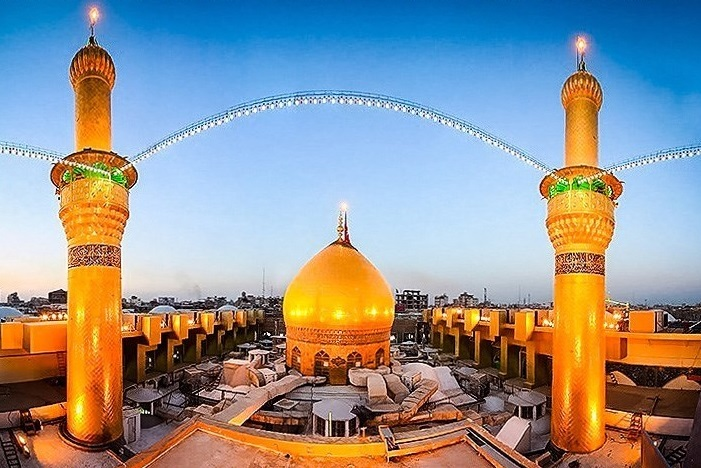
Imam Husayn Shrine

- Karbala is reputed to be the city where Husayn, the grandson of the Prophet Mohammed, was martyred. Karbala is also the site of two important Shiite mosques, Al Abbass Mosque and Imam Hussain Mosque. Shiites observe a 40-day mourning period for this Imam every spring followed by a pilgrimage to this site.

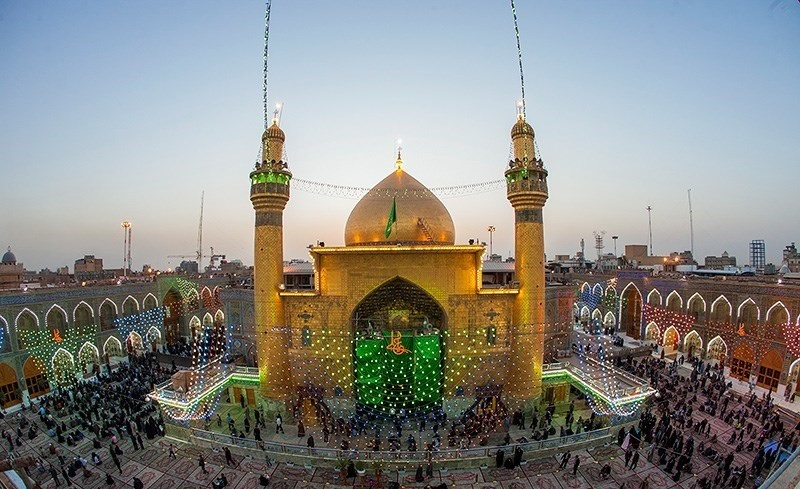
Imam Ali Mosque in Najaf

- Najaf is the site of Ali ibn Abi Talib's tomb known to Shiites as "the wondrous place of martyrdom" and site of one of the world's largest and most important Muslim cemeteries. Najaf is also the site of Imam Ali Mosque one of the holiest Shi'ite mosques.

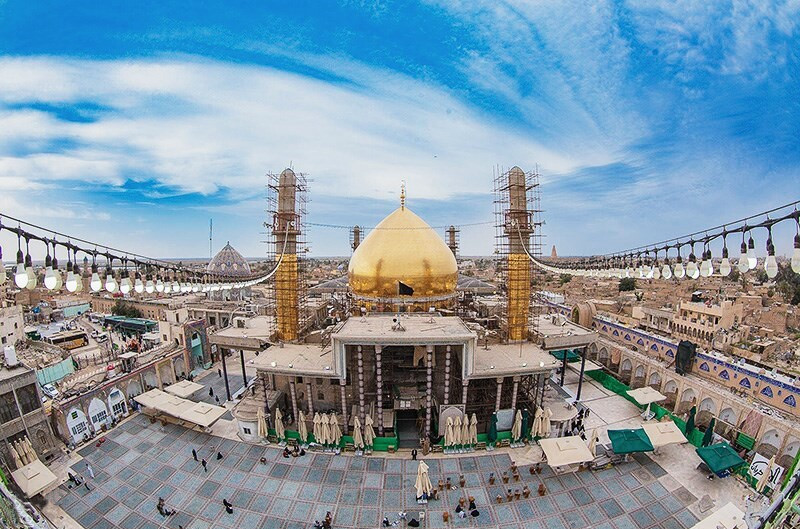
Al Askari Mosque in Samarra

- Samarra is the site of Shiite Al Askari Mosque.In this Mosque tenth Shia Imam Ali al-Hadi and eleventh Shia Imam Hasan al-Askari are buried.

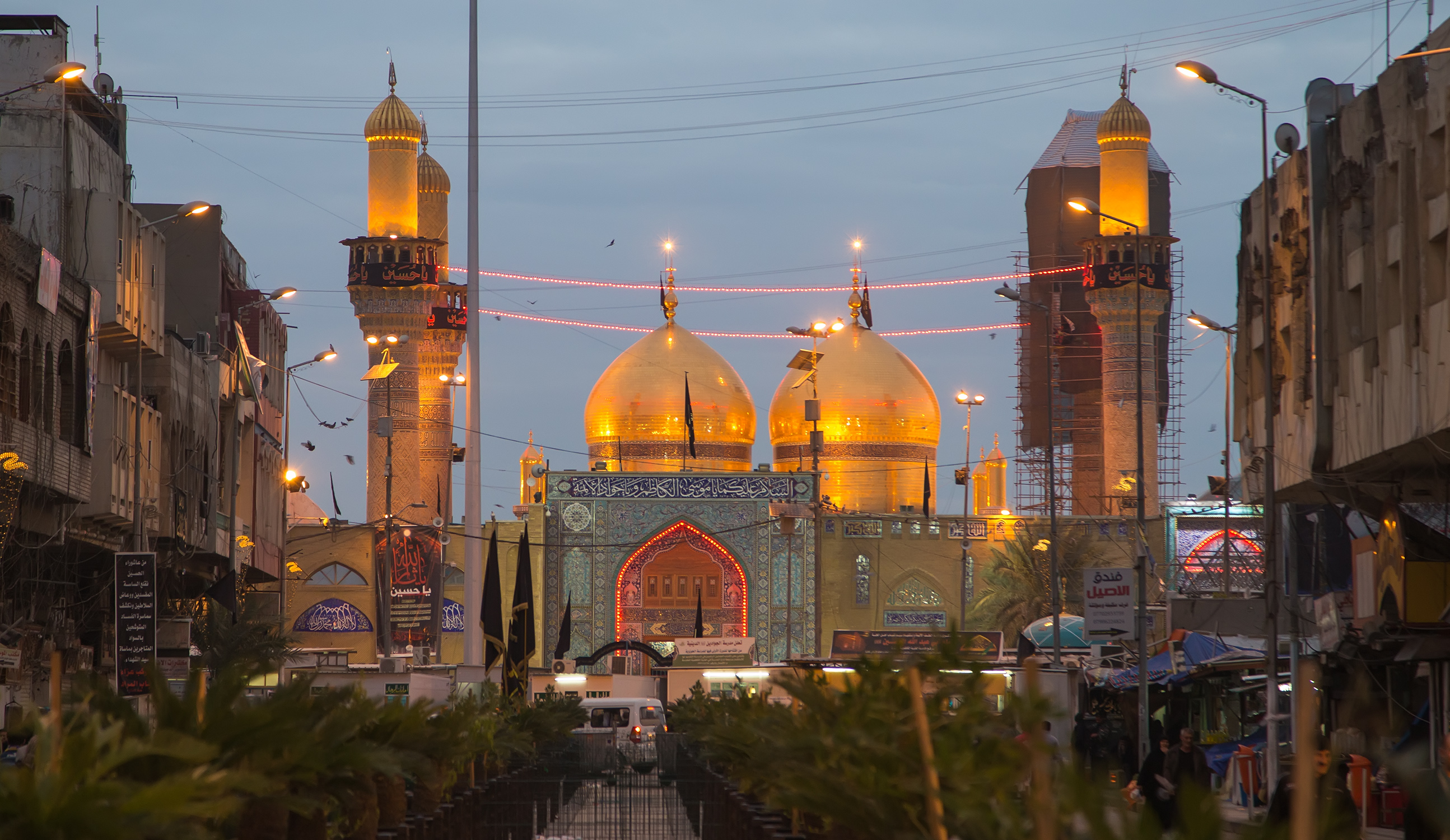
Al-Kadhimiya Mosque in Khadmiya

- Kadhimiya (north of Baghdad) is regarded as a holy city in Shia Islam. Musa al-Kazim and his grandson, the ninth Shia Imam, Muhammad at-Taqi are both buried there, and their tombs are contained in the Al Kadhimiya Mosque. Shia go on an annual pilgrimage to this shrine in the month of Rajab.

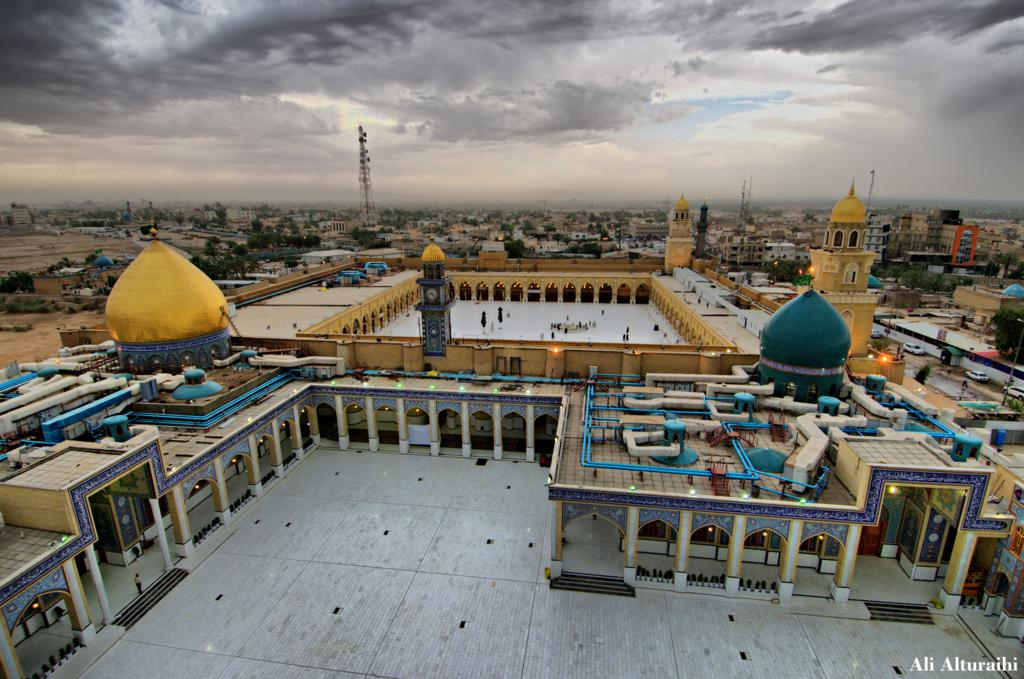
Mosque of Kufa in Iraq

- Great Mosque of Kufa in Kufa, Iraq - contains the tombs of Muslim ibn Aqeel, Khadijah bint Ali, Hani ibn Urwa, and Al-Mukhtar. The mosque also contains many important sites relating to the prophets and Ali, including the place where he was fatally struck on the head while in prostration, Sujud.

=== Christian ===
Assyrian Christians constitute one of the most indigenous communities in the country. Iraq houses some of the most ancient early Christian material culture, including various churches and monasteries in Tikrit, Nineveh, Dohuk, and the Barwari Bala region. These sites include St. Hermiz and St. Matthew monasteries in the town of Alqosh, the churches of Mar Qayoma and St. George in the Assyrian village Dure in Barwar, St. Bnai Shmuni in Aradan, Sapna region, as well as St. Odisho in the village Dere, also in the Sapna region in Northern Iraq.

=== Baháʼí Faith ===
- Baghdad – The House of Bahá'u'lláh in Baghdad, is a place of Baháʼí pilgrimage. Its significance is that it is where Bahá'u'lláh lived in from 1853 to 1863 (except for two years). It is designated in the Kitáb-i-Aqdas as a place of pilgrimage and is considered a holy place by Baháʼís. During the 1920s the house was confiscated by Shiah authorities, who were hostile to the Baháʼí Faith. The Council of the League of Nations upheld the Baháʼí's claim to the house, but it has not yet been returned to the Baháʼí community.

== Other geographic features ==
- Al-Faw Peninsula (شبه جزيرة الفاو)
- Diyala River (نهر ديالى)
- Euphrates (ܦܪܬ ܢܗܪܐ) (نهر الفرات)
- Shatt Al Arab (شط العرب)
- Tigris River (ܕܩܠܬ ܢܗܪܐ) (نهر دجلة)
- Great & Little Zab Rivers

== See also ==
- Districts of Iraq
- Iraq in the Qur’an
- List of largest cities of Iraq
- List of Assyrian settlements
