= Elijah of Nisibis =

11th-century archbishop

Elijah Archbishop of Nisibis
- Native name: Classical Syriac: ܐܠܝܐ
- Church: Church of the East
- Archdiocese: Nisibis
- Province: Metropolitanate of Nisibis
- Appointed: 26 December 1008
- Term ended: 18 July 1046
- Predecessor: Yahballaha
- Successor: Abdisho ibn Al-Aridh ?
- Other post: Bishop of Beth Nuhadra

Orders
- Ordination: 15 September 994 by Yohannan V
- Consecration: 15 February 1002 by Yohannan V
- Rank: Archbishop

Personal details
- Born: Elijah Bar Shinajah; February 11, 975 Shenna, Abbasid Caliphate (modern-day Iraq)
- Died: July 18, 1046 (aged 71) Mayyafariqin, Al-Jazira, Abbasid Caliphate (modern-day Silvan, Diyarbakır, Turkey)
- Occupation: Cleric, writer, theologian, historian, linguist, scholar

Elijah, Eliya, or Elias of Nisibis (Classical Syriac: ܐܠܝܐ, 11 February 975 – 18 July 1046) was a cleric of the Church of the East, who served as bishop of Beth Nuhadra (1002–1008) and archbishop of Nisibis (1008–1046). He has been called the most important Christian writer in Arabic—or even throughout non-Christian Asia—during the 11th century. He is best known for his Chronography, which is an important source for the history of Sassanid Persia.

== Name ==
He shares the name of the Biblical prophet Elijah (Hebrew: אֱלִיָּהוּ, Eliyahu), whose name meant "My God is Jah". The Syriac form of his name is Ēlīyā or Ēlīyāh (ܐܹܠܝܼܵܐ) in Classical and Eastern Syriac and Ēlīyō (ܐܶܠܺܝܳܐ) in Western Syriac. In Latin translation, this became Elias.

He is usually distinguished as "Elijah of Nisibis" (Latin: Elias Nisibenus; Arabic: Illiyā al-Nasībī) from the location of his archbishopric. He is also known by the patronymic Elijah Bar Shinajah (Classical Syriac: Elīyā bar Shennāyā; Arabic: Iliyyā ibn al-Sinnī), meaning "Elijah, son of Shenna", in reference to the place of his birth.

== Life ==
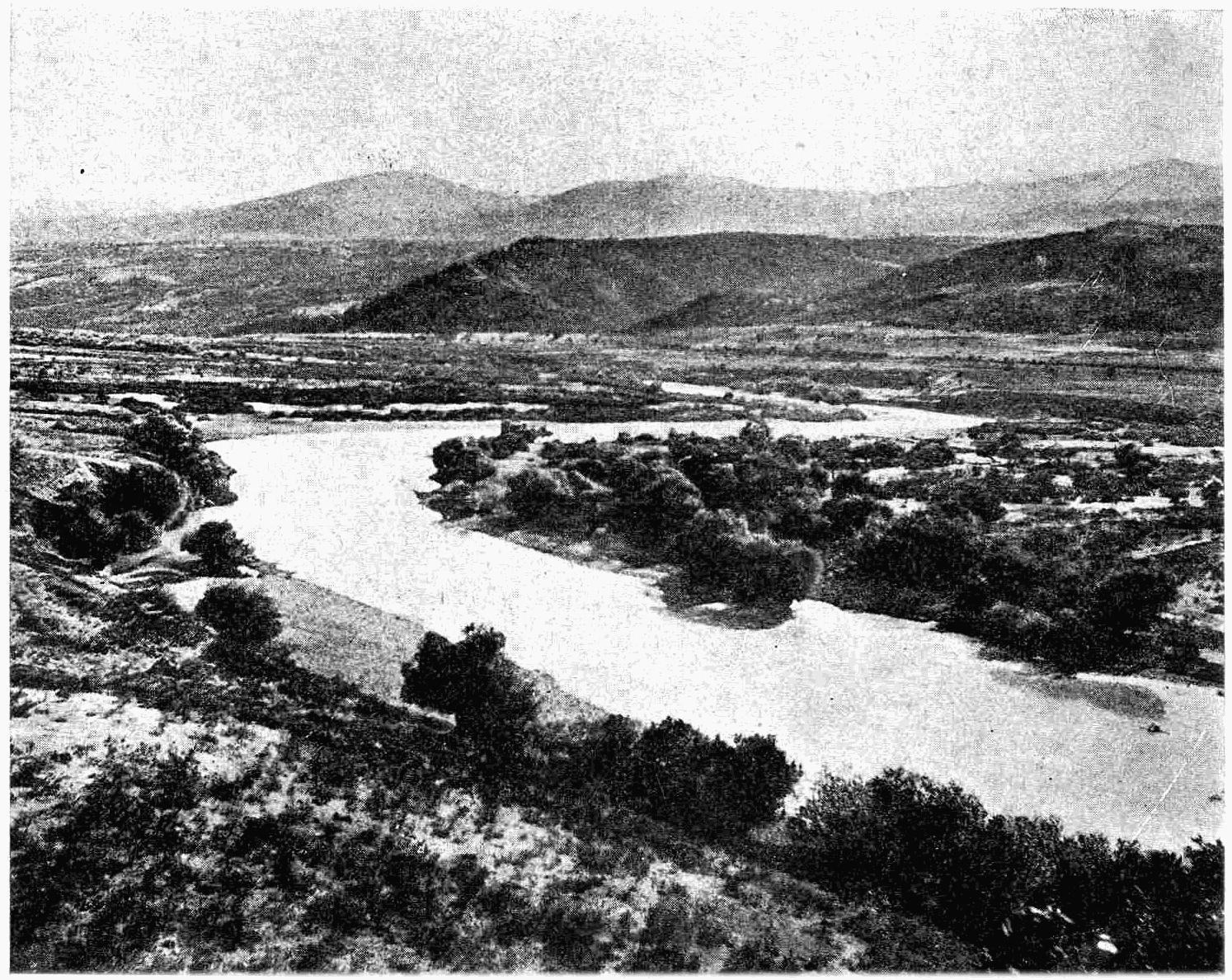
The valley of the Little Zab in the 19th century

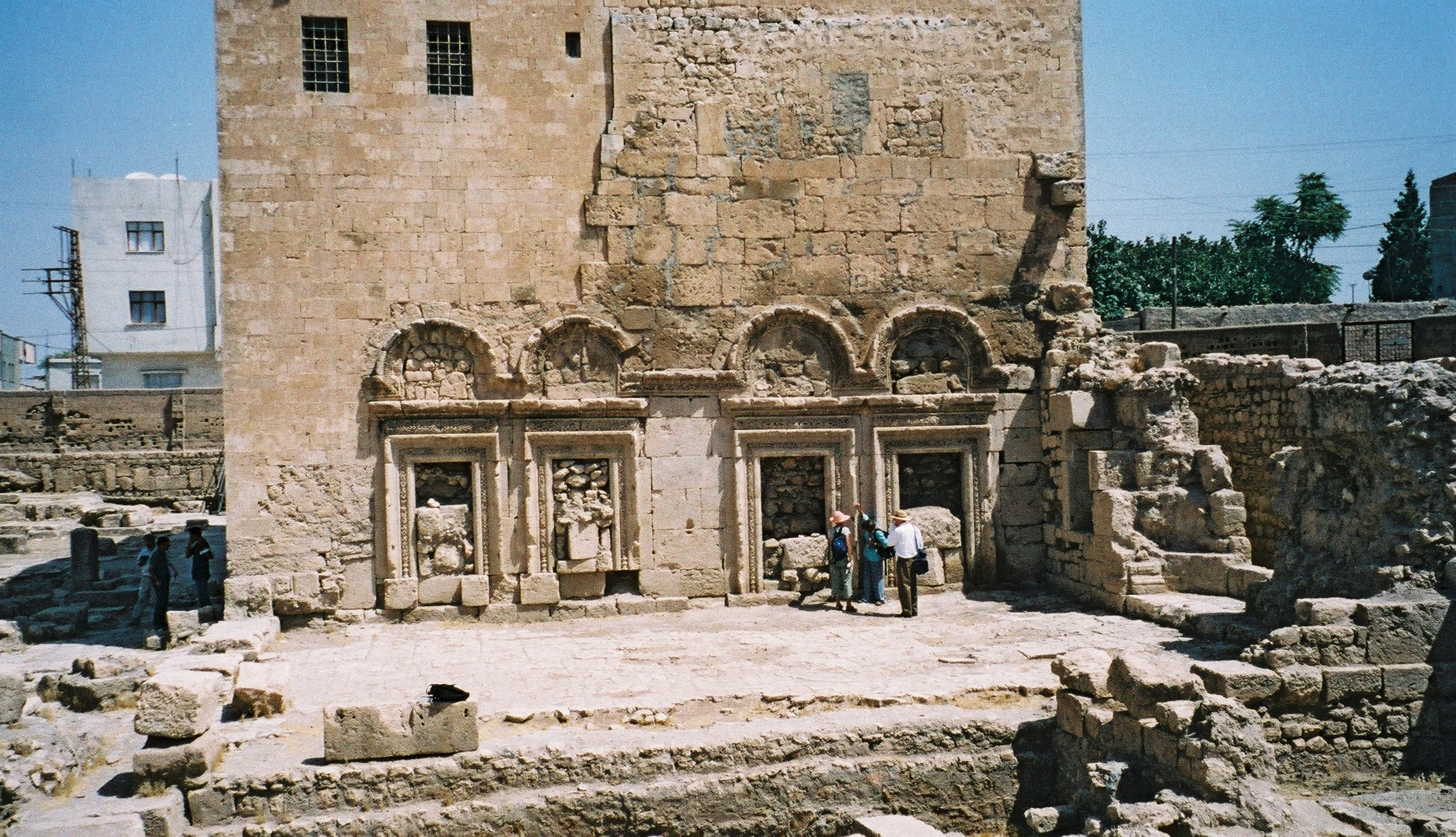
The ruins of the medieval St Jacob Cathedral in present-day Nusaybin, Turkey

Elijah was born in Shenna, just south of the Little Zab's confluence with the Tigris (near present-day Al-Zab, Iraq) on 11 February 975.

On Sunday, 15 September 994, he was ordained as a priest at the monastery of Mar Shemʿon by Yohannes, archbishop of Fars and bishop of Shenna. He studied throughout northern Mesopotamia, including Mosul.

On Sunday, 15 February 1002, he was consecrated bishop of Beth Nuhadra (present-day Dohuk, Iraq) by Yohannan, who had become the Patriarch of the Church of the East in 1000 by appealing directly to the Abbasid governor at Shiraz without regard to the usual election procedures.

On Sunday, 26 December 1008, he succeeded Yahballaha as archbishop of Nisibis (present-day Nusaybin, Turkey).

From 15–29 July 1026, he paid a series of visits—the "Seven Sessions"—to the Abbasid vizier Abu'l-Qasim al-Husayn ibn Ali al-Maghribi to discuss Christian doctrines and other topics. Additional meetings between the two were held in December 1026 and June 1027. Three letters—two by Elijah and one by the vizier—are preserved from their correspondence the following year, showing their continuing good relations.

He died on 18 July 1046 at Mayyafariqin.

== Works ==
=== Chronography ===
Elijah is best known for his Chronography or Chronology (Arabic: Kitāb al-Azmina; Latin: Opus Chronologicum), which forms an important source concerning the history of Sassanid Persia. It is divided into two sections, a chronicle modeled after Eusebius's Ecclesiastical History and a treatment of calendars and calendrical calculations. It is exceptional among Syriac chronicles for the large amount of civil history Elijah included among his ecclesiastical notices. The chronicle includes separate lists of the Sassanid dynasty (after the lost 7th-century work of James of Edessa) and the patriarchs of Seleucia (after the lost 5th-century work of Annianus of Alexandria). The popes and other patriarchs are included in the general annals which begin during the reign of the Roman emperor Tiberius and end with the year 1018. His treatment of calendrical systems has tables for computation of the Syriac and Persian new years and includes several Zoroastrian calendars, along with their feasts and holidays. As seen, many of Elijah's own sources, which he thoroughly documents, have now been lost and his own work is preserved in only a single manuscript, (Note: A brief section of Elijah's work is also quoted in a separate manuscript.) which fortunately includes few omissions. (Note: The principal lacunae are four folios covering the years 785–878 and one folio covering the years 971–994.) The manuscript is in Syriac, with most paragraphs in the first section followed by an Arabic translation. The Chronography was the last East Syrian text to be written in Syriac.

There have been two published editions of the work:

- Delaporte, L.-J., ed. (1910), La Chronographie d'Élie Bar-Šinaya, Métropolitain de Nisibe, Bibliothèque de l'École des Hautes Études, Vol. 181, Paris: Librairie Honoré Champion. (in French)
- Brooks, E.W.; et al., eds. (1909–1910), Opus Chronologicum, Corpus Scriptorum Christianorum Orientalium: Scriptores Syri Textus, 3rd Ser., Vol. VII, Rome, Paris, &c.. (in Latin) & (in Classical Syriac)

=== Book of Sessions ===
Elijah's Book of Sessions or Dialogues (Arabic: Kitāb al-Majālis) claims to relate his conversations during his seven visits to the Abbasid vizier Abu'l-Qasim al-Husayn ibn Ali al-Maghribi. Dedicated to the "honorable, believing, elder brother" Abu al-ʿAla Saʿid ibn Sahl al-Katib, the work is intended as a literary apologetic as much as record of the events of the seven meetings, with its epilogue including the imprimatur of the patriarchal secretary Abu al-Faraj ʿAbd Allah ibn at-Tayyib. In order, the chapters cover:

- God's unity and trinity
- Jesus's incarnation of divine and human natures
- Quranic support for considering some forms of Christianity as a monotheistic religion
- Logical and miraculous justifications for various Christian doctrines
- Elijah's own profession of monotheism
- Language and considerations of its importance in theology
- Christian perspectives on astrology, Islam, and the soul

According to Elijah's account, the vizier asking for the meetings after he had experienced a miraculous cure at the hands of a Christian monk, causing him to reconsider his previous understanding of their faith as polytheistic and unfaithful to God. It is particularly remembered for its statement of Christian monotheism in trinity in its 5th dialogue.

A full critical edition of the Book of Sessions along with the correspondence between Elijah and Abu'l-Qasim al-Maghribi was published by Nikolai N. Seleznyov.

=== Other works ===
A 1524 manuscript edition of Elijah's Book of the Interpreter

Elijah also composed other theological and scholarly works.

He wrote defenses of the Church of the East against both Islam and other Christian denominations and treatises on Syrian canon law, asceticism, and ethics. His guide to "rational management" of anxiety (Arabic: Kitāb dafʾ al-Hamm) is also dedicated to the Abbasid vizier, whom he claims requested such a book during their sessions together. It advocates cultivating a general thankfulness; treatment of general anxiety through the religious virtues of piety, gratitude, chastity, humility, mercy, and repentance; and treatment of specific anxieties through the philosophical virtues of seeking advice, behaving well, and being generous, just, and forgiving. His "Letter on the Unity of the Creator and Trinity of His Hypotases" (Arabic: Risāla Fī Wahdāniyyat al-Khāliq wa-Tathlīth Aqānīmihi) states the arguments for trinitarianism for a curious Islamic judge. His "Letter on the Merit of Chastity" (Arabic: Risāla fī Fadīlat al-ʿAfāf) attempts to refute Muʿtazilī al-Jāhiz's (d. 869) arguments in favor of physical pleasure.

He also composed a Syriac grammar and a Syriac–Arabic dictionary, The Book of the Interpreter (Arabic: ܟܬܐܒ ܐܠܬܪܓܡܐܢ ܦܝ ܐܠܬܥܠܝܡ ܠܓܗ ܐܠܣܪܝܐܢ, romanized: Kitāb al-Tarjumān fī t-Taʕlīm Lughat as-Suryān, 'The Book of the Interpreter for Teaching the Syriac Language' ). The Arabic sections of the book were written using Garshuni, a transliteration of Arabic into the Syriac alphabet. The work was further translated into Latin by Thomas Obicini as his 1636 Thesaurus Arabico-Syro-Latinus.

Editions of these works include:

- Gottheil, Richard J.H., ed. (1887), A Treatise on Syriac Grammar, Berlin.
- Horst, Louis, ed. (1886), Des Metropolitan Elias von Nisibis Buch vom Beweis der Wahrheit des Glaubens, Colmar: Eugen Barth (in German). Reprint: Gorgias Press, 2012.

== Legacy ==
In addition to Elijah's importance to Persian history and for his preservation of passages of otherwise lost ancient and medieval authors, he became famed throughout the Islamic world for his studious method and wide-ranging expertise in Christian and Islamic theology, language and literature, philosophy, medicine, and mathematics.
