= Hawija District =

Hawija District قضاء الحويجة
- District
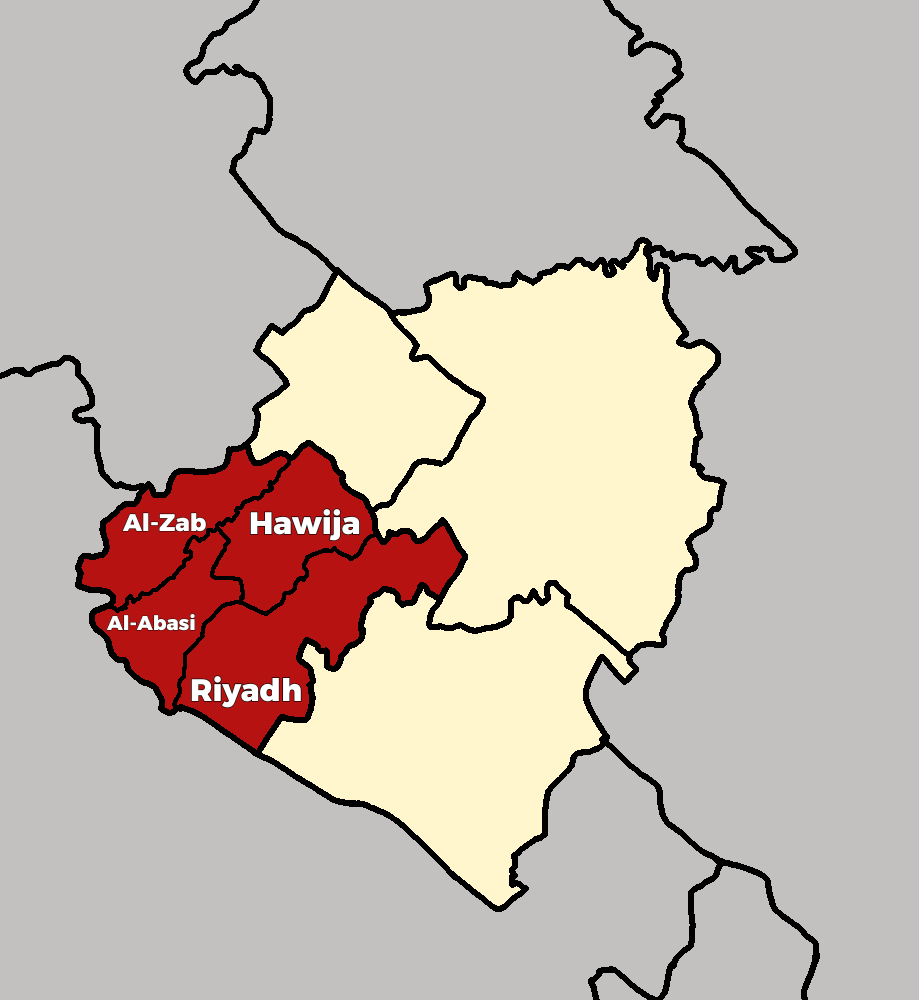
- Map of Hawija District
- Country: Iraq
- Governorate: Kirkuk
- Seat: Hawija

Area
  - Total: 2,678 km^{2} (1,034 sq mi)

Population (2024)
  - Total: 321,299
  - Density: 120.0/km^{2} (310.7/sq mi)
- Time zone: UTC+3 (AST)
- Area code: +964 50

Hawija District (Arabic: قضاء الحويجة, romanized: qaḍāʾ al-Ḥawīǧa) is a district in Kirkuk Governorate, Iraq. Its administrative center is the city of Hawija.

The district's 321,299 inhabitants are mostly Sunni Arabs, with the rest being Shia Turkmens and Kaka'i Kurds. Most of the inhabitants live in rural areas.

== Towns and villages ==
- Hawija
- Al-Zab
- Al-Abbasi
- Riyad
- Al-Rashad
- Sudayrah

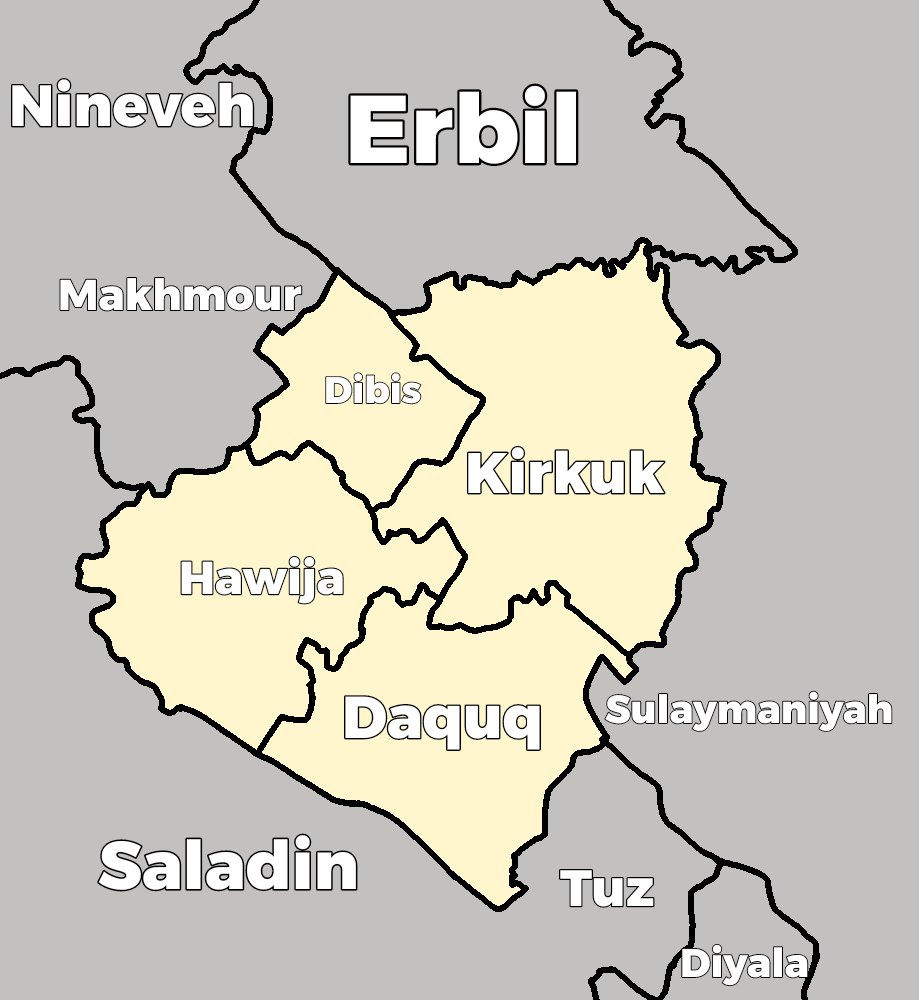
