= 2015 Hawija bombing =

- Part of the War in Iraq (2013–2017)
Date	3 June 2015
Location	Hawija, Iraq
Result	Controversial bombing with civilian casualties

Belligerents
Netherlands (Royal Netherlands Air Force)	ISIS

Casualties and losses
None	Unknown number of ISIS militants
- 85+ civilian deaths

The 2015 Hawija bombing was a controversial military airstrike carried out by the Royal Netherlands Air Force at 00:02 local time during the night of 2–3 June 2015, as a central component of Operation Inherent Resolve, the international coalition campaign against ISIS. Executed by two Dutch F-16s, the mission targeted an ISIS vehicle-borne improvised explosive device factory and weapons storage facility located in the industrial neighbourhood of Hawija, Iraq.

Although the strike successfully hit its intended target, the munitions ignited approximately 18,000 kilograms of explosives stored by ISIS, triggering a massive explosion. The blast registered a magnitude of 4.3 on the Richter scale and left a crater of 11 meters deep. The explosion resulted in at least 70 to 85 civilian deaths and over 500 injuries, while damaging or destroying roughly 6,000 homes and 1,200 businesses. While Royal Netherlands Air Force pilots reported the district-wide destruction immediately, Dutch involvement and the scale of civilian casualties were only publicly revealed in October 2019, sparking significant political and public outcry in the Netherlands.

== Background ==
Following the rapid advance of ISIS in 2014, the Netherlands joined the US-led international coalition, Operation Inherent Resolve, to provide air support and training for local forces. Between October 2014 and December 2018, the Royal Netherlands Air Force conducted over 2,100 missions in Iraq and Syria. The city of Hawija, a significant agricultural and commercial hub, had been under ISIS occupation since June 2014 and was considered one of the group's strongholds.

In the late 2014, the US Langley Target Development Cell (CIA) identified a collection of warehouses in Hawija's industrial neighbourhood as a primary ISIS factory for vehicle-borne improvised explosive devices and weapons storage. Further analysis conducted by the Joint Improvised Explosive Device Defeat Organization confirmed the physical layout of the site was suitable for large-scale production of vehicle-borne improvised explosive devices. Based on this intelligence, the coalition planners labeled the site as a single use facility, intended purely for military purposes.

Later, however, field research performed by organizations such as PAX and Al-Ghad established that the Hawija industrial zone was actually a mixed-use area, where civilians commonly lived in workshops and commercial buildings. Additionally, by early 2015, the International Organization for Migration had reported a significant influx of internally displaced persons into Hawija, many of whom sought shelter in these industrial buildings. Although a potential for collateral damage was noted based on the adjacent residential neighbourhood by the CIA, the strike was approved under a Collateral Damage Estimate of low, which predicted zero civilian casualties during a nighttime operation. The mission was authorized by a Dutch Red Card Holder at the Combined Air Operations Center in Qatar.

== Direct effects ==
The secondary explosion, triggered by an estimated 18,000 kilograms of explosives stored in the warehouse, resulted in numerous direct civilian harm effects. Official Coalition assessments reported 70 civilian deaths, while independent field research verified at least 85 fatalities. Researchers noted that the true death toll is likely higher, partly due to unidentified internally displaced persons who remained buried under the rubble. The Mayor of Hawija estimated that over 500 individuals were injured as a result of the strike. Of 119 survivors interviewed for the field research, 46 reported sustaining physical injuries themselves, while 68 reported that one or more family members had been injured. Documented physical consequences included five miscarriages on the night of the strike and dozens of amputations, many of which were attributed to a lack of access to adequate medical care in the immediate aftermath. Several victims also suffered partial or total loss of eyesight or hearing.

The psychological impact of the bombing has been described as an overwhelming problem affecting nearly the entire community. Of the 119 interviewees, 108 reported that the events of the night contributed heavily to their own psychological distress, while 114 reported consistent trauma symptoms among their relatives. Nearly all respondents reported experiencing symptoms including insomnia, nightmares, panic attacks, and anxiety. Children were reported to be disproportionately affected, with some suffering severe shock that resulted in long-term mental illness or loss of speech.

== Reverberating effects ==
The 2015 Hawija airstrike resulted in a series of reverberating effects that impacted the city's infrastructure and socio-economic stability. The destruction of the industrial zone, a vital mixed-use area where residents both lived and worked, led to the immediate loss of approximately 1,200 businesses and the livelihoods of an estimated 1,900 workers. These economic pressures, alongside the loss of primary breadwinners and the high cost of specialized medical care, were linked to a reported increase in child labor.

Hawija's role as a significant agricultural center was also undermined; damage to irrigation canals reduced the water supply by 25%, and the city's agricultural research center saw its sapling output fall from 1.2 million to 200,000 annually. Critical infrastructure damage to the electricity sub-station stalled water treatment plants, forcing residents to depend on contaminated water, while healthcare services were constrained by facility damage and the flight of medical staff, leading to preventable deaths from untreated injuries.

Educational access was similarly restricted by the damage or destruction of 15 schools; due to strict Iraqi age limits, many children who missed years of schooling were permanently excluded from re-entering the system. These combined factors prompted the displacement of over 46,000 people.

Researchers noted that these effects were mutually reinforcing, creating a "vicious spiral" where physical disabilities led to an inability to work, which then made necessary medical care or school expenses unaffordable, further entrenching families in poverty while the city remained under ISIS occupation for two additional years.

== Needs and demands of victims ==
The survivors of the Hawija bombing claim recognition, accountability, and reparation for the suffering inflicted upon them. The primary demand of the victims is an official and sincere apology from the Dutch government, the then Minister of Defence, and those directly responsible for the attack. In addition to apologies, they demand individual financial compensation to meet their most urgent human needs. These funds are necessary for the reconstruction of destroyed homes and businesses, the financing of specialized medical care for chronic injuries (such as reconstructive surgery and prosthetics), and the support of families who have lost their breadwinner.

There is also a great need for psycho-social support for widespread trauma, which has particularly affected children. Many of those affected express a deep distrust of international aid organizations and collective infrastructure projects, which they view as prone to fraud or inadequate to alleviate individual suffering; they therefore advocate for direct support and active involvement in decision-making regarding aid provision. Having felt ignored by the Dutch government for years, several victims have since sought recourse in the Dutch legal system to enforce their demands through the courts.

== Investigation ==
Following the bombing, the Dutch Ministry of Defence, then led by Minister Jeanine Hennis-Plasschaert, conducted an informal fact-finding mission in June 2015 and a more structured internal investigation starting in January 2016. These early assessments, along with US military reports, concluded that targeting procedures were followed correctly and that the massive secondary explosion causing civilian harm was an "unexpectable" outcome of the strike. However, a comprehensive independent investigation by the Brouwer Commission (published in January 2025) identified significant failures in the handling and communication of intelligence.

The 2025 report revealed that information regarding the presence of civilians and refugees in the industrial zone was available through open sources but was not adequately integrated into the targeting process. Furthermore, while US intelligence (CIA) had noted the potential for collateral damage due to the adjacent residential neighborhood, this information was restricted within the "Five-Eyes" intelligence-sharing community and was not shared with or sought by Dutch commanders. The commission also concluded that the Dutch government provided repeatedly incomplete or incorrect information to Parliament. Specifically, despite receiving a briefing on June 9, 2015, that included American battle damage assessment images of residential destruction and internal reports labeling civilian casualties as "waarschijnlijk" (probable), Hennis-Plasschaert informed the Tweede Kamer later that month that no Dutch involvement in civilian casualties was known. Her successor eventually admitted in 2019 that Parliament had been incorrectly informed during her tenure in 2015.

Accountability concerns were further exacerbated by a 2026 report regarding recovered F-16 video footage from the morning after the strike. Although the Dutch Ministry of Defence had informed the 2025 commission that these images were "overwritten," they were later discovered in the archives. While the 2026 investigation found no evidence of a willful attempt to hide the footage, it pointed to serious organizational and archiving failures that had prevented the discovery of a "crucial source" during the primary investigation. These findings collectively fueled intense political and public backlash in the Netherlands regarding transparency and the perceived lack of precautionary measures for civilian safety.

== Public response ==
The bombing generated considerable domestic and international controversy, with human rights organizations such as PAX, Airwars, and the International Committee of the Red Cross criticizing the Dutch government for insufficient transparency and calling for the establishment of a civilian harm tracking cell. In May 2020, the Tweede Kamer unanimously adopted the motie-Belhaj, which highlighted that the process of truth-finding had been "difficult" and that transparency regarding civilian casualties remained "inadequate". Many critics pointed to the fact that the Dutch government did not publicly confirm its involvement in the strike for over four years, until investigative reporting by Nederlandse Omroep Stichting and NRC in October 2019 forced a public admission.

In the aftermath, Dutch Minister of Defence Ank Bijleveld expressed regret over the civilian deaths and admitted in 2019 that her predecessor, Jeanine Hennis-Plasschaert, had incorrectly informed Parliament in 2015 regarding the strike's consequences. Minister Stef Blok also acknowledged the probability of civilian deaths, stating that while military commanders attempted to avoid harm "to the utmost," the scale of the secondary explosion was unexpectable. To prevent similar incidents, the Ministry of Defence pledged to improve intelligence assessment processes and initiated a five-step plan in 2022 to institutionalize transparency regarding civilian harm in military missions.

While the Dutch government maintained that the strike was a legitimate military action under international law and rejected legal liability for damages, it allocated 4.5 million euros for voluntary compensation. These funds were used for community-based reconstruction projects in Hawija, managed by the IOM and UNDP, to restore electricity, water, and commercial infrastructure. However, during visits by the Brouwer Commission to Iraq in 2022 and 2023, local officials and families affected by the bombing expressed significant dissatisfaction and anger over the lack of individual compensation and the perceived delay in the Dutch response. In 2025, during the tenure of Minister Ruben Brekelmans, the discovery of previously "lost" F-16 footage from the day after the strike reignited public debate and raised further questions regarding institutional trust and the government's accountability for the event.

The human rights monitoring organization Airwars played a central role in challenging the Dutch government's secrecy regarding the strike. As early as August 2015, Airwars identified the bombing in Hawija as a high-casualty event involving at least 70 non-combatants, a claim the Ministry of Defence initially dismissed while maintaining there was no evidence of Dutch involvement. In a critical 2017 report, the organization labeled the Netherlands the "least transparent member" of the international coalition, highlighting that it was the only ally that refused to share the specific locations, dates, and targets of its airstrikes. Airwars argued that this lack of transparency created a "transparency crisis" that made public scrutiny impossible and prevented affected families from identifying who was responsible for the harm to their loved ones. Furthermore, the organization emphasized that under coalition rules, each nation remains individually liable for the civilians it kills or injures, urging the Dutch government to establish independent national monitoring mechanisms rather than relying solely on centralized coalition data.

== Remote warfare ==
Remote warfare marks a strategic shift toward verticality, using drones and airstrikes to minimize Western military risk and avoid the political costs of combat casualties. While legitimized as supposed surgical precision, this distance creates a "strategic ignorance" regarding the actual harm inflicted on civilian populations

The 2015 Hawija bombing serves as a primary case study of these failures. Planners misidentified a densely populated industrial zone, where workers and displaced persons lived, as a single-use military facility. The strike ignited 18,000 kg of TNT, causing a catastrophic secondary explosion that was kept from the public for over four years.

Accountability is further complicated by organizational fragmentation and a reliance on remote sensing that "cannot see through rubble". This reliance fosters a state of "unknowability" where reverberating effects, such as economic ruin, mass displacement, and long-term trauma, remain invisible to Western publics. Ultimately, remote violence ripples out over years, causing an undoing of life where survivors are left trapped in ruins, unable to seek recognition or redress from those who bombed them from afar.

== Controversy and legal repercussions ==
The attack raised questions about the accountability of military officials in the Dutch airforce. Critics suggested that those responsible for planning and executing the bombing should be held accountable under international humanitarian law. Several human rights organizations, including Amnesty International and Human Rights Watch, called for independent investigations into the Dutch military's actions.

In light of these events, the Dutch government committed to reviewing its military procedures and ensuring better transparency in future operations. As of 2025, ongoing debates continue over the extent to which military forces should be held accountable for collateral civilian damage during airstrikes.

== Reactions ==
- Dutch Ministry of Defence: The Ministry of Defence defended the strike, stating that it was part of the broader mission to defeat ISIS. However, they acknowledged the need for reform to prevent similar incidents.
- International Human Rights Groups: Organizations like Human Rights Watch condemned the bombing, calling it a violation of international law due to the failure to prevent civilian casualties.
- Dutch government officials: Several high-ranking Dutch officials, including Ministers Bijleveld and Blok, promised to review the military's operational procedures. Personal apologies were also issued to the victims' families.
