= Yahballaha =

- Gender: Male

Origin
- Origin: Syriac
- Meaning: God has given
- Region of origin: Middle East

Other names
- Related names: Theodore, Adeodatus, Attallah

Yahballaha, sometimes spelled as Yaballaha (Syriac: ܝܗܒܐܠܗܐ), is a Syriac masculine given name meaning "God has given". Notable people named Yahballaha include:

- Yahballaha I, patriarch of the Church of the East from 415 to 420
- Yahballaha II, patriarch of the Church of the East from 1190 to 1222
- Yahballaha III (1245–1317), patriarch of the Church of the East from 1281 to 1317
- Yahballaha IV (died 1580), patriarch of the Chaldean Catholic Church from 1572 to 1580
- Yahballaha V (disambiguation)
