= Al Zab =

Al Zab الزاب
- Town
- Etymology: Named after the Little Zab
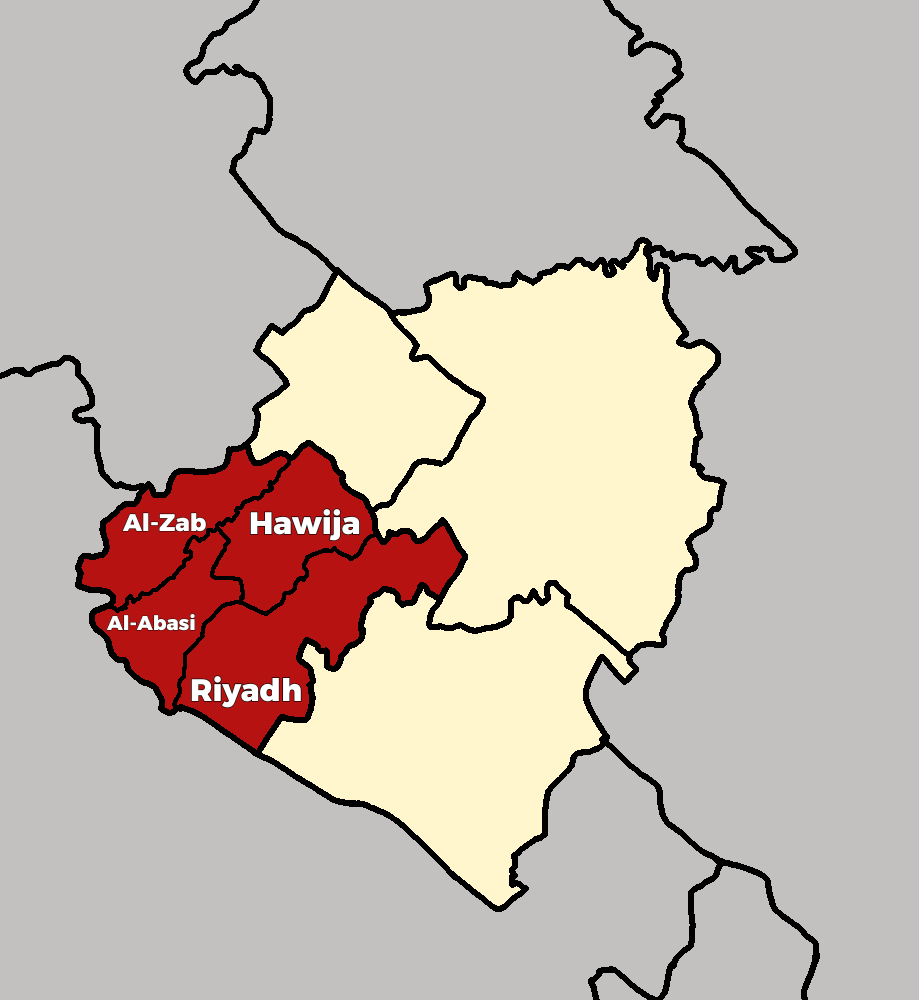
- Location of Al-Zab in Hawija District, Kirkuk Governorate.

- Location in Iraq
- Country: Iraq
- Governorate: Kirkuk Governorate
- District: Hawija District

Population (2024)
  - Total: 19,471
- Occupied by the Islamic State of Iraq and the Levant from June 2014 until September 2017, when it was recaptured by Iraqi forces during the Hawija offensive.

Al Zab, Al-Zab, or Az-Zab is a town in Iraq administered as part of the Kirkuk Governorate's Hawija District. Between 2014-2017, it was under the control of the Islamic State of Iraq and the Levant (ISIL) and was recaptured by Iraqi government forces during the Hawija offensive in September, 2017.

== Geography ==
Al Zab is located just northeast of the Little Zab's confluence with the Tigris River in northeastern Iraq.

== History ==
Al Zab is situated just north of the former location of Shenna, a significant settlement during the Abbasid Caliphate, which was home to a Nestorian bishopric. Due to the rapid demographic growth of the Kurdish population in Iraq, Saddam Hussein incorporated the predominantly Arab district of Hawija, including Al Zab, into the Kirkuk Governorate in 1968 to facilitate easier control by his Baath Party.

In December 2005, during the Iraq War, a resistance bomb detonated near Al Zab on its road to Hawija, killing an American soldier. Another bomb on the same road disabled an armored vehicle and killed one soldier in January 2006.

Al Zab was occupied by the Islamic State during their Northern Iraq Offensive on 10 June 2014, the same day as the fall of Mosul. It thereafter became a center for their incursions into the Salah al-Din Governorate's Al-Shirqat District. In July 2016, they forcibly and hurriedly evacuated the town's civilian population, leaving them to shift in the desert while IS fighters constructed tunnels which they filled with oil. For its part, the Islamic State periodically publicizes its charitable works in the town.
