= Yahballaha V =

Yahballah V may refer to:

- Yahballaha III, Patriarch of the Church of the East 1281–1317
- Yahballaha IV, Chaldean Catholic Patriarch of Babylon 1572–1580

== See also ==
- List of patriarchs of the Church of the East
- List of Chaldean Catholic patriarchs of Babylon
