= Sudayrah =

Coordinates: 35°24′28″N 43°17′28″E

Sudayrah is a village in Kirkuk Governorate, Iraq. It is located on the east bank of the river Tigris and south-east of Al-Shirqat, which lies on the western banks of the river. By 2016, Sudayrah was under control of Islamic State of Iraq and the Levant.
