= Great Mosque of Kufa =

7th-century Iraqi mosque

- مَسْجِد ٱلْكُوفَة ٱلْمُعَظَّم / ٱلْأَعْظَم
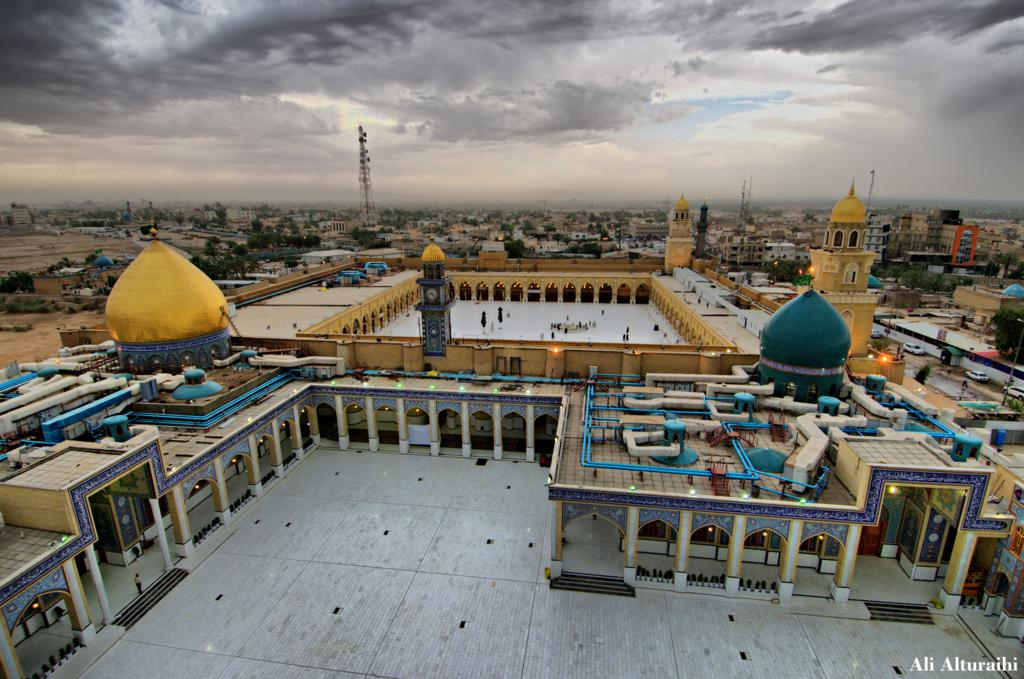
- The mosque in 2014

- Location of the mosque in Iraq

Religion
- Affiliation: Shia Islam
- Ecclesiastical or organisational status: Mosque and shrine
- Status: Active

Location
- Location: Kufa, Najaf Governorate
- Country: Iraq
- Interactive map of Great Mosque of Kufa
- Coordinates: 32°01′43″N 44°24′03″E

Architecture
- Type: Shi'i Mosque
- Style: Islamic architecture Safavid (domes)
- Founder: Saad Ibn Abi Waqqas
- Completed: 638 CE (prime); 670 CE

Specifications
- Interior area: 11,000 m^{2} (120,000 sq ft)
- Dome: Two
- Minaret: Four
- Shrines: Three: Muslim ibn Aqeel; Hani ibn Urwa; Al-Mukhtar
- Materials: Bricks; marble; gold; silver

Website
- masjed-alkufa.net

The Great Mosque of Kufa (Arabic: مَسْجِد ٱلْكُوفَة ٱلْمُعَظَّم/ٱلْأَعْظَم, romanized: Masjid al-Muʿaẓẓam/al-ʾAʿaẓam), or Masjid al-Kufa, is a Shi'ite mosque and shrine, located in Kufa, in the Najaf Governorate of Iraq. Completed in 670 CE, it is one of the earliest surviving mosques in the world. The mosque was home to Ali ibn Abi Talib, the 4th Rashidun caliph; and contains the shrine of Muslim ibn Aqeel, his companion Hani ibn Urwa, and the revolutionary, Al-Mukhtar. The mosque has been significantly rebuilt and restored multiple times in its history.

== History ==
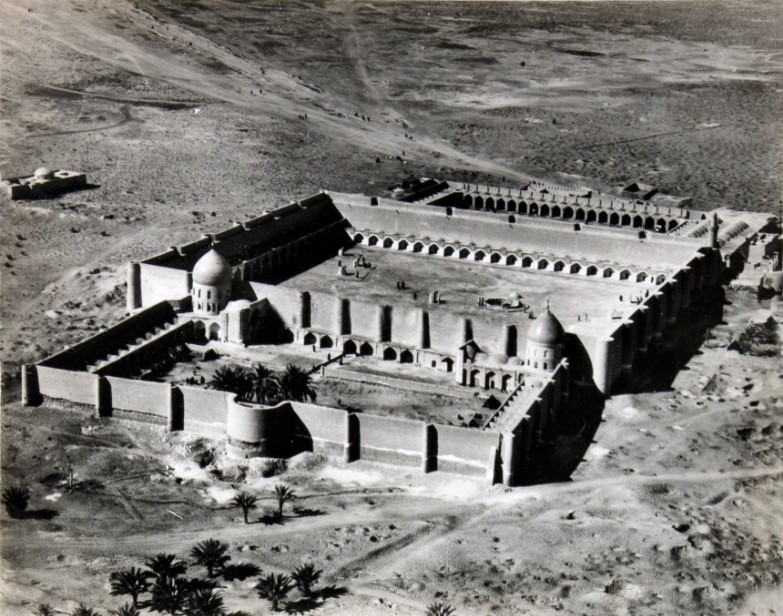
The mosque in 1915

The first main mosque of Kufa was built with the city's foundation in 638 CE. The original mosque had a square layout and many entrances, and was built alongside a governor's palace (Dar al-Imāra). It featured a roofed colonnade and re-used columns from the nearby former Lakhmid capital of al-Hira and from former churches. The governor's palace likely served as both a residential building and an administrative center.

Ali ibn Abi Talib was assassinated in the mosque in 661 CE. The family members of the first Shi'ite imams and their early supporters were buried within the mosque, including Muslim ibn Aqil and Hani ibn Urwa.

In 670, the governor of the city, Ziyad ibn Abihi, arranged for the mosque to be rebuilt in brick and expanded into a much more monumental form. Craftsmen from other regions were brought in and materials were imported from Ahwaz for the mosque's columns. The governor's palace, or Dar al-Imara, adjacent to the south side of mosque, was also rebuilt. Architectural excavations revealed that the mosque was built on top of much older foundations.

It was in the Great Mosque of Kufa that the first Abbasid caliph was formally proclaimed in 749. By the 14th century, when Ibn Battuta visited the site, only the foundations of the old governor's palace still remained. The mosque underwent various other restorations throughout its history. The golden dome standing today over the tombs, as well as the surrounding tilework decoration, was added during the Safavid period in the 17th and 18th centuries.

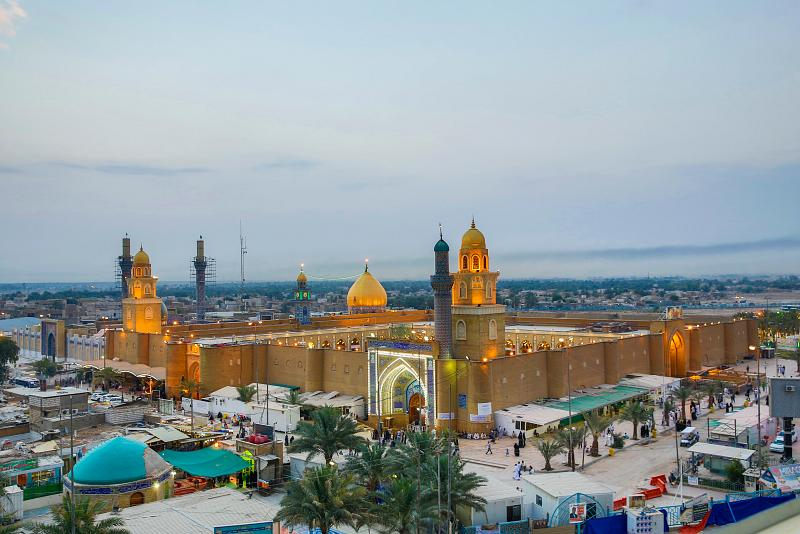
Kufa mosque in 2016

In 1998, head of Dawoodi Bohra community, Mohammed Burhanuddin started reconstructing and renovating the mosque. Work was completed in early 2010. The renovation included decorations with gold and silver, the mihrab being made with a gold zari, and the whole interior being surrounded with verse of the Qur'an. In addition, the courtyard is covered in white marble from Makrana, India.

Today, the outer wall of the mosque, with semi-circular buttresses, probably dates from the early period of the building's history. The building's floor level has also been raised from its earlier level.

== Architecture ==
=== Mosque ===
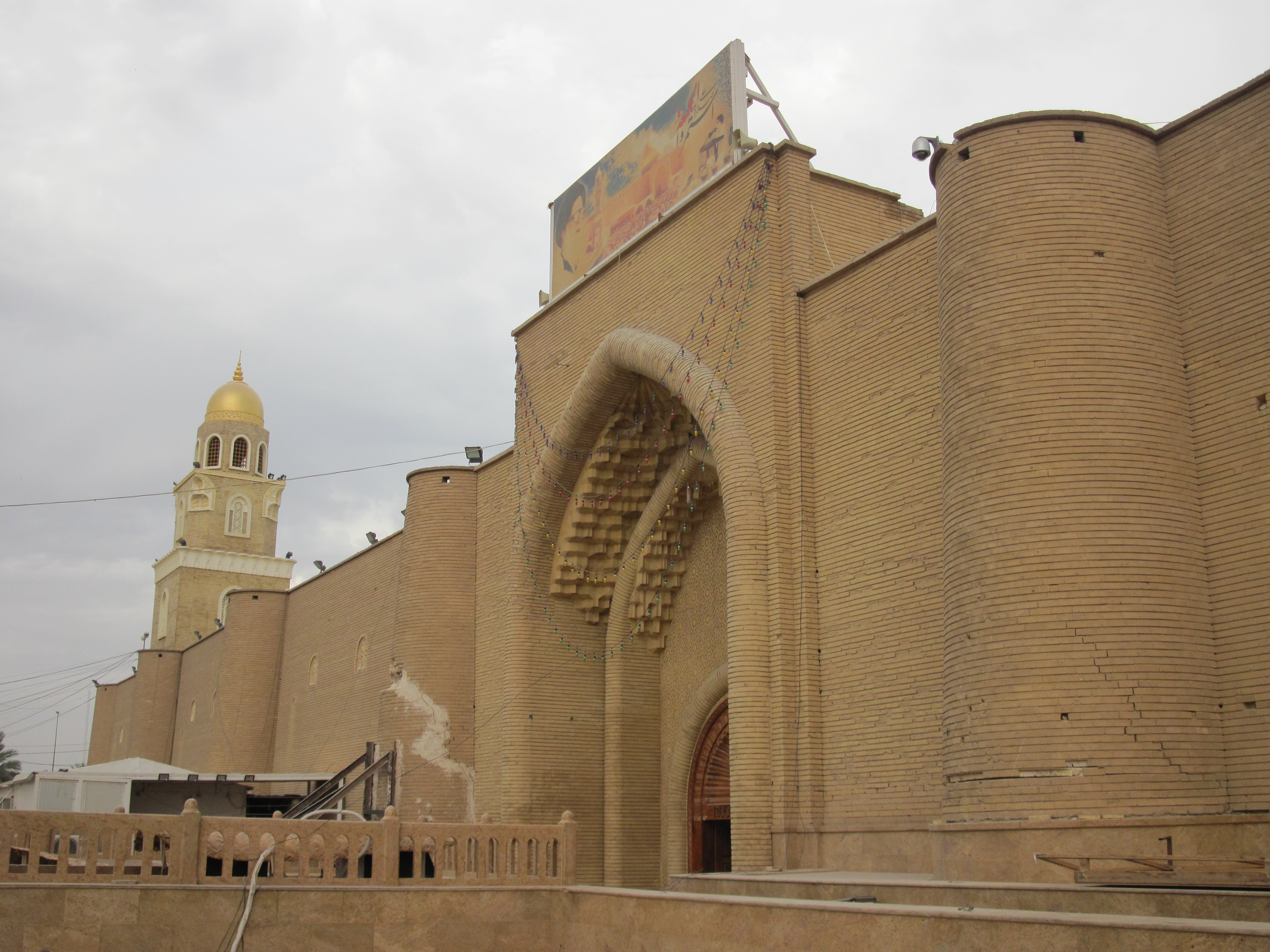
One of the entrances and outer walls of the historic mosque

The area of the building measures approximately 11,000 square metres (120,000 sq ft). The historic mosque has a quadrangular layout, measuring 110 by 112 by 109 by 112 metres (361 ft × 367 ft × 358 ft × 367 ft). It has semi-circular bastions along its outer walls, three circular (three-quarter-round) towers at its corners, and historically had one minaret, according to investigations of the site in the 20th century. The present-day mosque has four minarets. Small differences were found among the four walls of the mosque. The southern wall, which faced the Qibla, measured approximately 110 metres (360 ft) long. The back wall spanned 109 metres (358 ft), while the remaining two side walls measured 116 metres (381 ft) each. These walls, towering in height, were reinforced by semi-circular towers on their exteriors.

The mosque has five gates: Gate of the Threshold (Bāb al-Sudda), Gate of Kinda (Bāb Kinda), Gate of al-Anmat (Bāb al-Anmāṭ), Gate of Hani ibn Urwa, and the Gate of the Snake (Bāb al-Thu‘bān) or Gate of the Elephant (Bāb al-Fīl).

The historic mosque structure has similarities to the design of the palaces of pre-Islamic Persia. According to a description by Ibn al-Athir (d. 1233), its ceiling was taken from a Persian palace and resembled the ceiling of a Byzantine church.

=== Palace remains ===
Archeological excavations in the 20th century revealed the presence of an even larger quadrangular structure, measuring 168.2 by 169.98 metres (551.8 by 557.7 ft), that was once attached to the south side of the mosque. This structure has been identified as the Palace of Sa'd ibn Abī Waqqāṣ, which historical sources say was originally built at the same time as the original mosque after the city's foundation (c. 638 CE). Also known as the Qaṣr al-Imāra or Dar al-Imāra ('Palace of the Governor'), it was rebuilt by Ziyad ibn Abihi at the same time as the mosque in 670 CE. Archeologists identified three main layers of construction at the site, which were often reconstructions along the same lines as the preceding layer. The remains of the palace are still visible today but are not generally accessible and are threatened by underground water seeping into the site.

The palace was composed of an outer enclosure wall (attached to the mosque) and an inner enclosure (measuring approximately 110 by 110 metres (360 by 360 ft). Like the mosque, the outer walls of these enclosures had semi-circular bastions and circular corner towers, although the oldest layer of construction at the inner enclosure featured square towers that were rebuilt in rounded form over the first foundations. The inner enclosure, which was accessed via a main entrance on its north side, was filled with rooms and structures that were modified in several periods. Its main features included a central square courtyard from which a triple-arched entrance on each side led to other rooms. The entrance on the south side led to a quadrangular hall with an iwan-like or basilical layout divided by columns into three aisles. This led in turn to a large square chamber further south that was probably domed.

== Religious significance ==
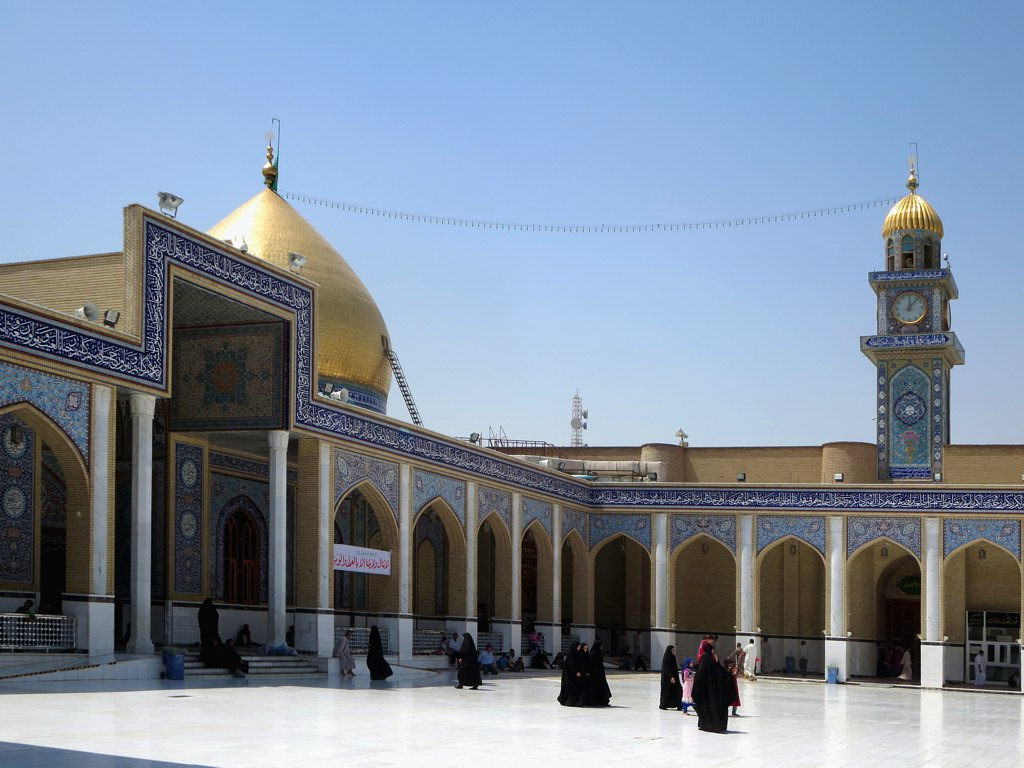
Area of the mosque containing the shrines, including the golden dome over a tomb chamber (left)

The Great Mosque of Kufa was the place where Ali ibn Abi Talib was fatally wounded by a poison-coated sword while prostrating in the Fajr prayer.

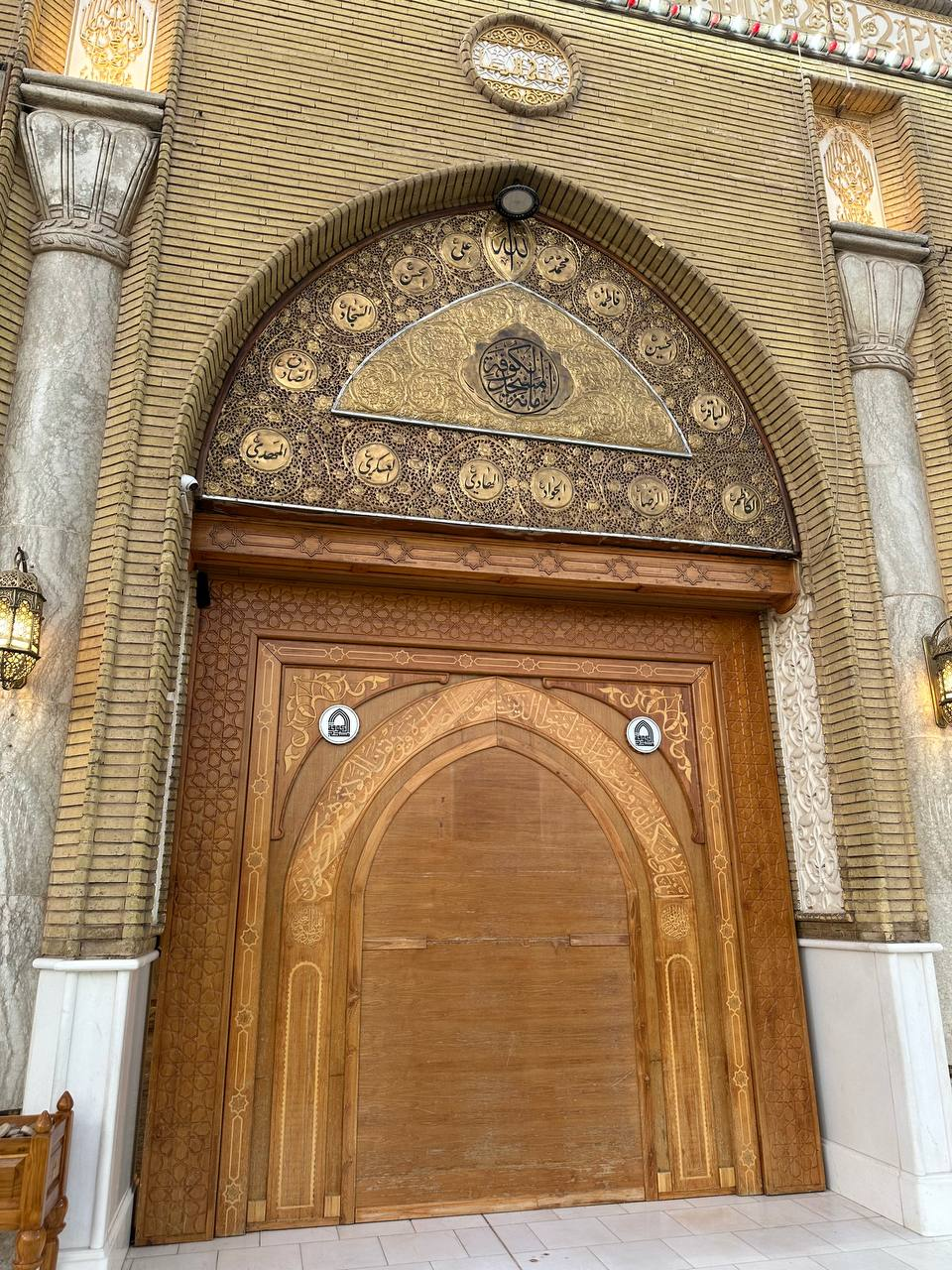
A great mosque in the Islamic world

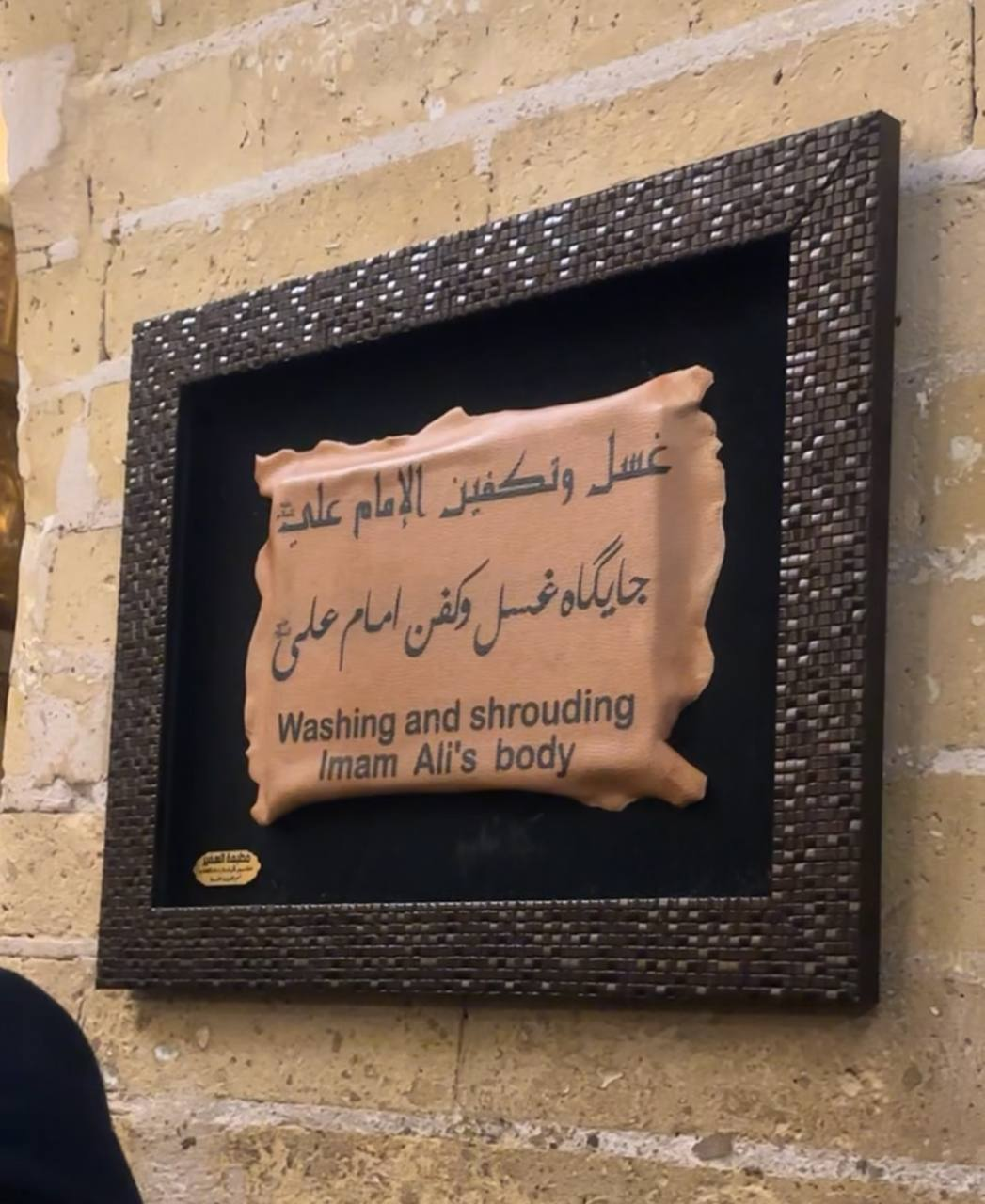
The place where Imam Ali was washed and shrouded, which is also inside the Great Mosque of Kufa.

Also, the mosque contains the tombs of Muslim ibn Aqil, Hani ibn Urwa, and Al-Mukhtar. There are markers within the mosque indicating the locations for where the court of Ali used to preside, where he performed miracles, and where Zayn al-Abidin and Ja'far al-Sadiq used to perform Salah. Additionally, Islamic traditions relate that it was the dwelling place of Nuh (Noah) and that this was the place where he built the Ark. According to Shia belief, it was from this mosque that the diluvium of Noah started submerging earth, as well as being the place from where the water was re-absorbed—also marked within the mosque. Ja'far al-Sadiq said that up to nineteen kilometres (twelve miles) of land in all directions from the mosque are blessed by its holiness. Ja'far al-Sadiq was also recorded as remarking that the "mosque in Kufa is superior to that of Jerusalem" and that "performing two prostrations of prayer here would be better for me than ten others at any mosque." There are also Shia traditions which state that performing one obligatory prayer in this mosque is the same as having performed one thousand prayers elsewhere, and performing one obligatory prayer here is equal to having performed an accepted Hajj.

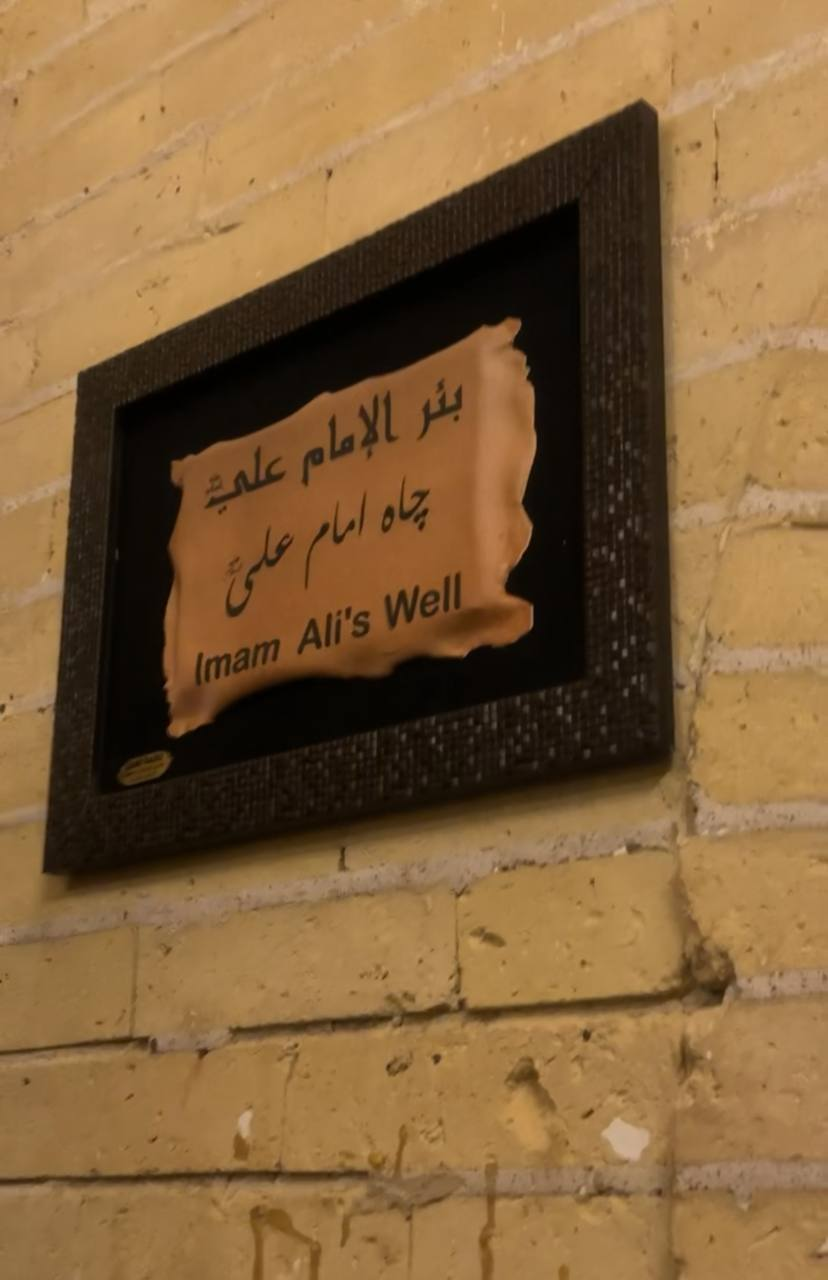
The well of Imam Ali, which still contains water and is used by people for drinking.

The secretariat of Al-Kufa Mosque and its shrines describes the mosque as being one of the sole four dignified mosques to which Muslims must travel, and that it comes in third place after the Kaaba and the mosque of Prophet." Lastly, according to Shia belief, it is from this mosque that the messianic twelfth Imam, Muhammad al-Mahdi, will rule the world, and it will serve as the seat of his power in the end of times.

== See also ==
- Holiest sites in Shia Islam
- List of mosques in Iraq
- List of oldest mosques
- Shia Islam in Iraq
