= Hani ibn Urwa =

7th-century Yemeni leader

The shrine of Hani ibn Urwa in the Great Mosque of Kufa, a holy site in Shia Islam.

Hani ibn Urwa al-Muradi (d. 680) was the chief of the Banu Murad tribe, which lived in Kufa. He was a companion of Ali, and participated in the Battle of the Camel and the Battle of Siffin. He was also the representative of Husayn, and was killed by the order of Ubayd Allah ibn Ziyad, the Umayyad governor of Kufa, for his loyalty to the Ahl al-Bayt. Hani is buried in the Great Mosque of Kufa in Iraq, alongside Muslim ibn Aqil and Mukhtar al-Thaqafi.

== See also ==
- The Battle of Karbala
