= Henner =

Henner is both a surname and a masculine given name. Notable people with the name include:

== Surname ==
- Christal Henner, American bridge player
- Jean-Jacques Henner (1829–1905), French painter
- Julie Henner (born 1970), American middle-distance runner
- Marilu Henner (born 1952), American actress and producer
- Mishka Henner (born 1976), French British artist

== Given name ==
- Henner Henkel (1915–1942), German tennis player
- Henner Hofmann (1950–2026), Mexican cinematographer and film producer
- Henner Hoier, German singer and vocalist for The Rattles
- Henner von Hesberg (born 1947), German classical archaeologist
