= Hawija =

Hawija الحويجة (Arabic)
- Hawija's location in Iraq
- Coordinates: 35°19′30″N 43°46′20″E
- Country: Iraq
- Governorate: Kirkuk Governorate
- District: Hawija District
- Elevation: 190 m (620 ft)

Population (2024)
  - Total: 38,902
- Time zone: UTC+3 (AST)

Hawija (Arabic: الحويجة, Al-Ḥawīja), also called Hawija Al-Ubaid, is the central town of Hawija District in the Kirkuk Province of Iraq, 45 km (28 mi) west of Kirkuk, and north of Baghdad. The town has a population of about 38,902 inhabitants.

Hawija District has approximately 321,299 inhabitants, mostly populated by Sunni Arabs.

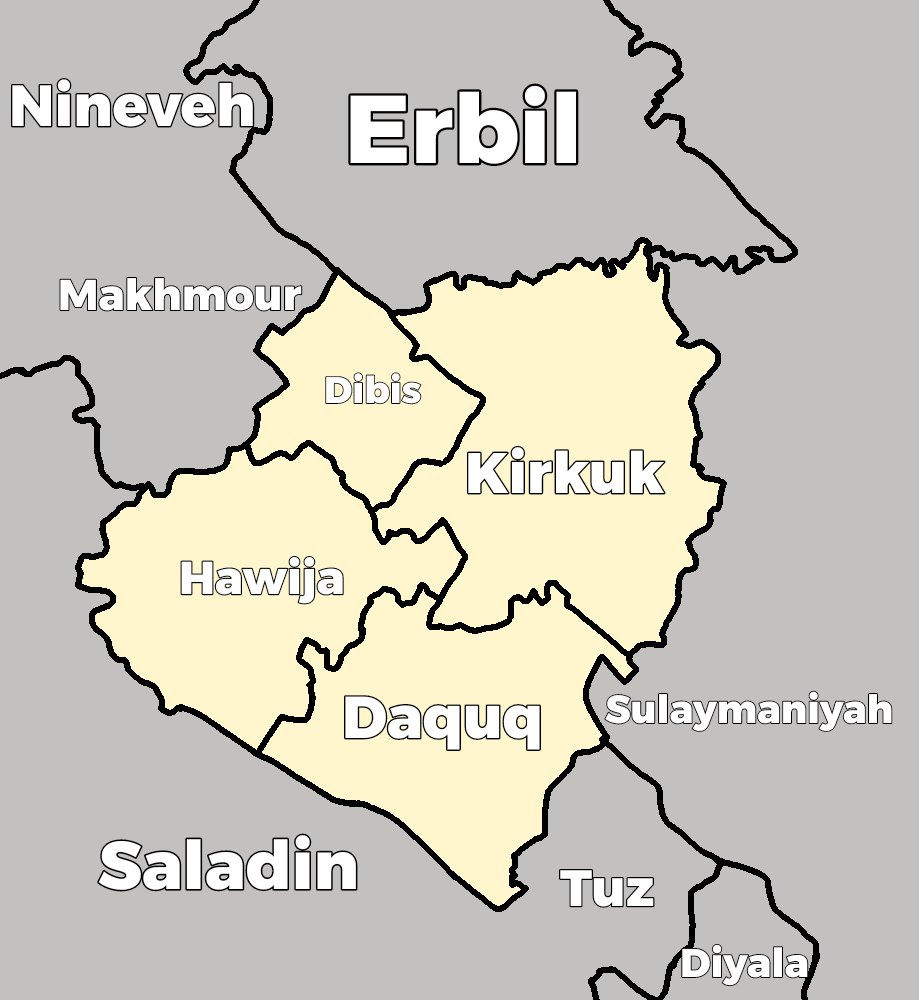

== History ==
Hawija, is inhabited by the Al-Ubaid tribe, the Dulaim tribe, and the Al Jubour and Shammar tribes.

=== Iraq War, 2003–2011 ===
During the Iraq War, U.S. and Iraqi forces experienced numerous lethal attacks in the area from Sunni insurgents. The area of Hawija was once considered one of the most dangerous in all of Iraq with US soldiers and the foreign press corps in Baghdad dubbing Hawija "Anbar of the North," a reference to the violence wracked province in Western Iraq.

=== After U.S. withdrawal ===
According to open sources on 23 April 2013, Hawija became the focus of violent anti-government protest and deadly Government intervention tactics which left at least 27 Sunni protesters shot dead, exacerbating political division and sectarian polarization within Iraq. Later death toll of protests was 53, while associated violence resulted in 215 deaths by April 27. This crackdown prompted Sunni tribal figures in the town and across northern Iraq to harden their rhetoric against Maliki's government. Gun battles erupted across Iraq's majority-Sunni cities between protesters and Iraqi Security Forces—including in Ramadi, Fallujah, and Mosul. From Jordan, influential religious figure Sheikh Abdul Malik al-Saadi said, "self defense has become a legitimate and legal duty." Some Sunni tribes mobilized, declaring jihad against Baghdad.

An IS operated prison was raided in the area by Kurdish and American special operations forces on October 21, 2015. After about 70 prisoners were freed, the US bombed the facility.

During IS occupation, Hawija's residents have suffered severe shortages of critical supplies, including food, water, and medicine. Many of the town's residents have fled. The Kurdistan Regional Government estimated that 18,000 people fled Hawija in August 2016; according to them approximately 400–450 families arrived at Peshmerga checkpoints from Hawija each week. The UN estimated around 300 arrivals at the Debaga Refugee Camp (one of the largest in Iraq) each week. Unconfirmed reports indicated that IS was executing civilians caught trying to escape, and planted land mines to keep residents in place.

Hawija, along with Mosul, is a place where IS members frequently carry out mass executions. For example, on August 6, 2016, they were said to have executed at least 100 people.

ISIL-occupied Hawija became isolated from the rest of IS's territory in July 2016 during the Battle of Mosul, when Al-Shirqat was captured by Iraqi troops. Hawija was IS's last enclave in central Iraq.

On September 21, 2017, Iraqi Prime Minister Haider al-Abadi announced an offensive to reclaim the city after over three years of IS rule. The city was liberated from IS by October 4, 2017.

In October 2022, Khadija Ahmad Murshid, also known as "Umm Rayyan", was chosen as the Mukhtar of the Al-Hurriyya neighborhood in Hawija, making her the first woman recorded to hold the position of Mukhtar in the Kirkuk Province.
