= Shenna =

Shenna is a given name and surname. Notable people with the name include:

- Shenna Bellows (born 1975), American politician
- Leila Shenna, Moroccan former actress

== See also ==
- Shanna (disambiguation)
- Sheena (disambiguation)
- Henner
