= List of populated places in Kurdistan Region =

This article contains a list of populated places in Kurdistan Region of Iraq. The region has four provinces divided into districts and sub-districts. The populated places include cities, towns and villages.

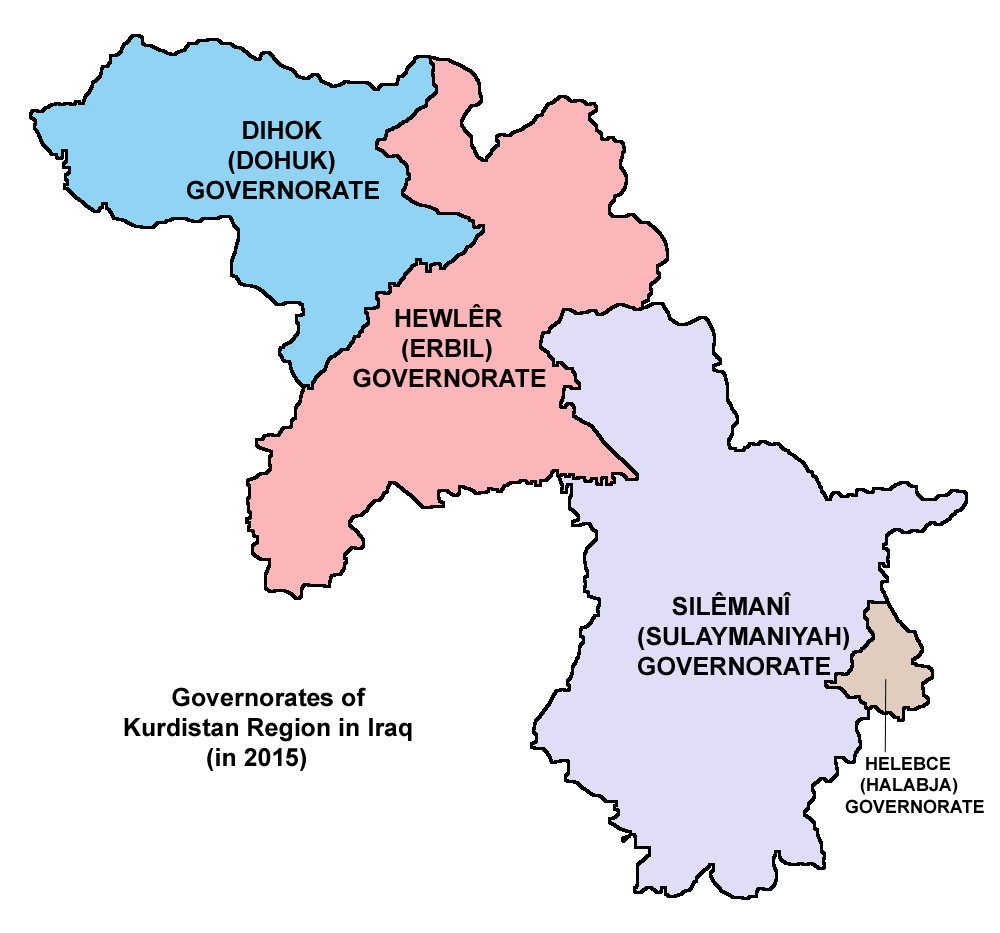
The four governorates of Kurdistan Region

== Duhok Governorate ==
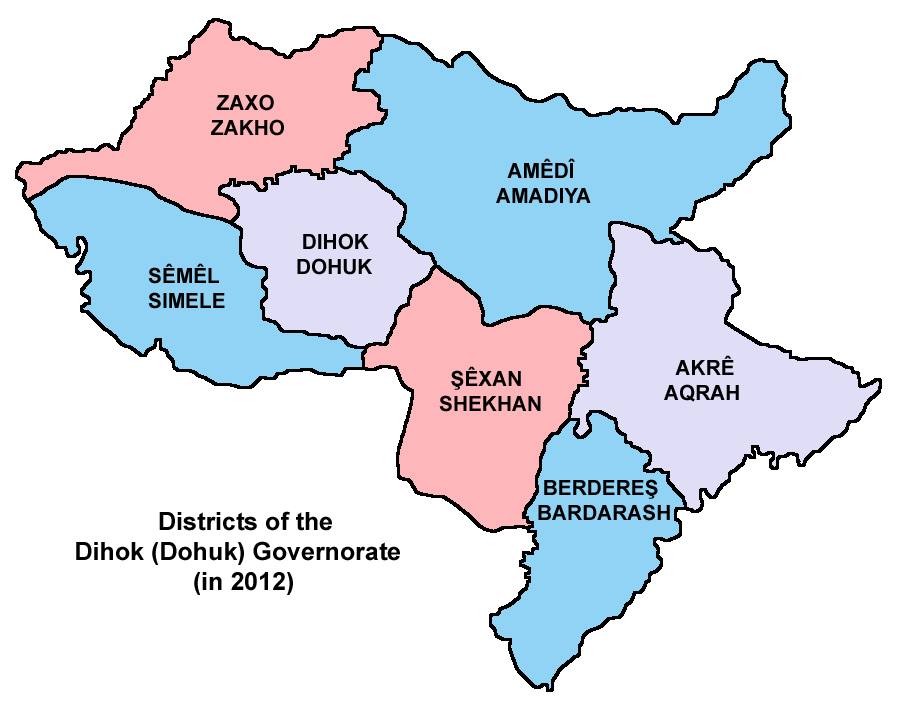
Districts of Duhok Governorate

=== Akrê District ===
Akrê District consists of the four sub-districts of Akrê, Dînarte, Bicîl and Girdesîn. Akrê is the capital of the district.

Name	Official name	Sub-district
Akrê	ئاکرێ	Akrê
	ئێکماله‌ و زه‌رگوزا	Akrê
	باکرمان	Akrê
	به‌یبناڤا	Akrê
	خربه‌	Akrê
	خه‌ردس	Akrê
	ڕه‌سلعه‌ین	Akrê
	شه‌رمن	Akrê
	شوش	Akrê
	گوندک	Akrê
	دینارتێ	Dînarte
	چه‌م بێکێ	Dînarte
	ئاگل ژووری	Dînarte
	ئاگل ژێری	Dînarte
	ئامادا	Dînarte
	بێکێ	Dînarte
	ئاڤده‌لکا	Dînarte
	شکه‌فته‌	Dînarte
	ئارتون	Dînarte
	بابولا	Dînarte
	بازێ گه‌لی	Dînarte
	بازێ قرنه‌	Dînarte
	بامشمش	Dînarte
	بانی	Dînarte
	به‌نی ماوه‌ت	Dînarte
	به‌رزنار	Dînarte
	بیره‌ که‌پرا	Dînarte
	توژگێ	Dînarte
	پرێسه‌	Dînarte
	چالێ	Dînarte
	جونی	Dînarte
	خانه‌گێ	Dînarte
	ده‌کان	Dînarte
	دڤری	Dînarte
	دو پرێ	Dînarte
	دودی ژێری	Dînarte
	دودی ژووری	Dînarte
	دوسته‌کا	Dînarte
	دینارته‌	Dînarte
	ژیرکا	Dînarte
	زانا	Dînarte
	زه‌مه‌ن	Dînarte
	زێوکه‌	Dînarte
	سه‌رانی ژووری	Dînarte
	سه‌رانی ژیری	Dînarte
	سه‌رکه‌ندال	Dînarte
	سوسێ	Dînarte
	سیان ته‌تو	Dînarte
	سیان حه‌جی حسێن	Dînarte
	شرتا	Dînarte
	شنی ژووری	Dînarte
	شه‌هێ	Dînarte
	چاربوت	Dînarte
	چه‌م سنێ	Dînarte
	چه‌م شرتی	Dînarte
	گربیش ژووری	Dînarte
	گربیش ژێری	Dînarte
	گسێ	Dînarte
	گورگاڤا	Dînarte
	گوهانا	Dînarte
	گویسکێ	Dînarte
	گیره‌	Dînarte
	کادانا	Dînarte
	کاڤلکا	Dînarte
	کافیا	Dînarte
	که‌شکاڤا و گرێ سور	Dînarte
	کورتکا	Dînarte
	مالاموسا	Dînarte
	میرداڤیا	Dînarte
	میمبه‌رێ	Dînarte
	مه‌زرینگان	Dînarte
	موسلیان	Dînarte
	مێره‌گی	Dînarte
	مێر گێ	Dînarte
	نپاخێ	Dînarte
	نه‌قه‌بێ	Dînarte
	شیڤا گویسکێ	Dînarte
	هنارێ	Dînarte
	هه‌رنی	Dînarte
	هه‌شتکا	Dînarte
	هویکێ	Dînarte
	چم چالێ	Dînarte
	سه‌رکێ	Dînarte
	خالانه‌	Dînarte
	بجیل	Bicîl
	بێخمه‌	Bicîl
	ئه‌ستریان	Bicîl
	بوسیل و سه‌روکانی	Bicîl
	بێسمه‌کران	Bicîl
	بیێ	Bicîl
	چه‌مه‌ سێل	Bicîl
	زنتا ودزوک وخانگه‌هێ	Bicîl
	خه‌لان	Bicîl
	دازین	Bicîl
	خول	Bicîl
	زرگێته‌	Bicîl
	سوسناوا	Bicîl
	سولاقه‌	Bicîl
	شانه‌ سۆر	Bicîl
	شه‌ره‌فونا و قه‌سروک شێخ	Bicîl
	سوریان	Bicîl
	گه‌رمکا صئوفی ژیر	Bicîl
	گه‌رمکا ممیا ژوور	Bicîl
	گه‌لوک مام ساک	Bicîl
	گه‌لوک مام گرد	Bicîl
	گه‌ویلان ودۆبێ	Bicîl
	گوجار و شکه‌فته‌ گوجار	Bicîl
	گوله‌نی وبڤزێ	Bicîl
	کشانه‌	Bicîl
	که‌لاتی وجونه‌له‌	Bicîl
	که‌نده‌ سۆر	Bicîl
	که‌نده‌ گول	Bicîl
	کێلانه‌	Bicîl
	کێلێ سێنان	Bicîl
	ماندیا زوور وزێر	Bicîl
	موکاوه‌	Bicîl
	میربالیان	Bicîl
	میربالیان	Bicîl
	مێرگه‌ موشک	Bicîl
	نێروه‌ وزێوه‌	Bicîl
	هیزان	Bicîl
Girdesîn	گرده‌سێن	Girdesîn
	خێلافت	Girdesîn
	سبیمال	Girdesîn
	باژێره‌ ژێری	Girdesîn
	باژێره‌ ژووری	Girdesîn
	باسه‌وێ	Girdesîn
	باشقال ڕاوه‌ند	Girdesîn
	باقسپێ و ئیسماوا	Girdesîn
	نهاوا	Girdesîn
	بانه‌مل	Girdesîn
	بانوره‌	Girdesîn
	بدریه‌	Girdesîn
	به‌راک	Girdesîn
	به‌هراوا فه‌قێ	Girdesîn
	به‌هراوا موسی	Girdesîn
	بێناتان	Girdesîn
	پیرخولین	Girdesîn
	تلبوک	Girdesîn
	جه‌لان ئامه‌دین	Girdesîn
	جه‌لان عه‌ره‌بوک	Girdesîn
	جولێره‌	Girdesîn
	جونان	Girdesîn
	خاتوناوا	Girdesîn
	خرابه‌ ژووری	Girdesîn
	خرابه‌ ژێری	Girdesîn
	خرابه‌ شائه‌	Girdesîn
	خه‌رجاوا	Girdesîn
	خه‌لانه‌	Girdesîn
	خه‌لیلکان	Girdesîn
	خه‌لین	Girdesîn
	درین شێخ	Girdesîn
	درین خواجه‌	Girdesîn
	دوستان	Girdesîn
	ڕه‌به‌نا	Girdesîn
	زێراڤ	Girdesîn
	زێلکه‌ فاخر	Girdesîn
	سیتکان	Girdesîn
	سه‌رده‌ریان	Girdesîn
	سه‌رکه‌ڤروک	Girdesîn
	سورکان	Girdesîn
	سیلان سالح	Girdesîn
	سیلان مامک	Girdesîn
	سمیلان	Girdesîn
	شاب ئومه‌ر	Girdesîn
	شکه‌فته‌ مغارا	Girdesîn
	شێخانوک مه‌لا حاجی	Girdesîn
	شیفره‌زان	Girdesîn
	ساله‌یێ	Girdesîn
	چه‌م سماق	Girdesîn
	چه‌م کشتاو و ملکێ جبو	Girdesîn
	ئومه‌ر خوشان	Girdesîn
	گرگوران	Girdesîn
	گلێنه‌	Girdesîn
	گورانک	Girdesîn
	گومکێ	Girdesîn
	قه‌سروک مام بال	Girdesîn
	قوپک	Girdesîn
	گه‌شکا	Girdesîn
	که‌له‌ دێر	Girdesîn
	کورکا به‌ست	Girdesîn
	کورکا کێری	Girdesîn
	کورکا مزگه‌فت	Girdesîn
	کوشک	Girdesîn
	کوله‌کا	Girdesîn
	کونسیخور	Girdesîn
	کێله‌ پسمیران	Girdesîn
	کێله‌ شێخ بزین	Girdesîn
	کێله‌ بی	Girdesîn
	کێله‌ سپی	Girdesîn
	له‌کان	Girdesîn
	مام خه‌لیفه‌	Girdesîn
	مام داودان	Girdesîn
	مه‌لکێ حسن ئاغا	Girdesîn
	مه‌لکێ حاجی	Girdesîn
	میرگێن	Girdesîn
	میرکاوه‌	Girdesîn
	نه‌هاوا خرابه‌	Girdesîn
	نێرگزین	Girdesîn
	وه‌رملان	Girdesîn
	جلیده‌	Girdesîn

=== Amêdî District ===
Amêdî District consists of the six sub-districts of Amêdî, Sersing, Kanî Masî, Dêrelûk and Çemankê and Bamernê. Amêdî is the capital of the district.

Name	Official name	Sub-district
Amêdî	ئامێدی	Amêdî
Mîrsitik	مێرسته‌ک	Amêdî
Kiwanê	کوانێ	Amêdî
Şrifa	شریفا	Amêdî
Rezîkê	ڕه‌زوک	Amêdî
Dêrê	دێرێ	Amêdî
Dêrereş	دێره‌ش	Amêdî
Pîrozane	پیروزانا	Amêdî
Bêbadê	بێباد نه‌سارا	Amêdî
Baniyê	بانیێ	Amêdî
Îbrahim Zila	ئیبراهیم زلا	Amêdî
Sersing	سه‌رسنگ	Sersing
Aşawe	ئاشه‌وا	Sersing
Hemzîk	هه‌مزێک	Sersing
Hevindka	هه‌ڤندکا	Sersing
Mêrgetû	مێرگه‌تی	Sersing
Gundik	گوندک	Sersing
Kure Markê	کوره‌مارک سیاره‌تیکا	Sersing
Gereko	گه‌ره‌گو	Sersing
Kanî Çinar	کانی چنارک	Sersing
Gûzê	گیزێ	Sersing
Gareya	گاره‌یا	Sersing
Titajîka	تاژیکا	Sersing
Sarkê	سارکێ	Sersing
Seydava	سه‌یداڤا	Sersing
Sikrîn	سکرین	Sersing
Serderav	سه‌رده‌راڤ	Sersing
Zêwa Seyda	زێوا سه‌یدا	Sersing
Ridêniya	ڕدێنیا	Sersing
Rustînkê	ڕوستینکێ	Sersing
Dihêkê	دهیک سه‌رگرک	Sersing
Biyê	بیێ	Sersing
Bênata	بێناتا	Sersing
Bubava	بیباڤا	Sersing
Botiya	بوتیا	Sersing
Bilê Cangê	بلیجانک	Sersing
Belîtê	به‌لیتێ	Sersing
Berê Ker	به‌رێ که‌ر	Sersing
Berbanik	به‌ربانک	Sersing
Bawerka Serkevrî	باوه‌رکا که‌فری	Sersing
Bawerka Ke'bê	باوه‌رکا که‌عبه‌	Sersing
Înîşkê	ئینشکێ	Sersing
Bêtkark	بێتکارک	Sersing
Kanî Masî	کانی ماسێ	Kanî Masî
Girwanş	گروانش	Kanî Masî
Hurkê	هورکێ	Kanî Masî
Hilwe Îslam	هلوه‌ ئیسلام	Kanî Masî
Hilwe Nisara	هلوه‌ نسارا	Kanî Masî
Hetirşê	هه‌ترشێ	Kanî Masî
Hirur	هرور	Kanî Masî
	هه‌دێنه‌	Kanî Masî
	میسکا	Kanî Masî
	مێرگا چیا و هێسێ	Kanî Masî
	مایێ ئیسلام ونسارا	Kanî Masî
	مه‌له‌خته‌	Kanî Masî
	کێسته‌	Kanî Masî
	کری	Kanî Masî
	کانی مه‌زنێ	Kanî Masî
	کانی سارکێ	Kanî Masî
	قومری	Kanî Masî
	قه‌سرکێ	Kanî Masî
	سفریه‌	Kanî Masî
	عه‌قار سوریا	Kanî Masî
	گیلکا	Kanî Masî
	کیکه‌لا	Kanî Masî
	گرکا	Kanî Masî
	چه‌م سه‌یدا	Kanî Masî
	چه‌لکێ نسارا	Kanî Masî
	چه‌قه‌ل ژێرێ	Kanî Masî
	چمبلکێ	Kanî Masî
	چه‌مێ دێرکێ	Kanî Masî
	سارکێ	Kanî Masî
	شێلازا	Kanî Masî
	شمایلا	Kanî Masî
	سه‌ره‌رو	Kanî Masî
	مکلانا و سه‌رگه‌لی	Kanî Masî
	سه‌رزێری و دوسکا	Kanî Masî
	سه‌رده‌شت	Kanî Masî
	ڕاڤینا	Kanî Masî
	دیفاف	Kanî Masî
Durê	دورێ	Kanî Masî
	ده‌رگه‌لا میسا به‌گێ	Kanî Masî
	ده‌رگه‌لێ	Kanî Masî
	خاری	Kanî Masî
	خشخاشا	Kanî Masî
	خرابه‌	Kanî Masî
	خانکێ	Kanî Masî
	چه‌لکێ ئیسلام	Kanî Masî
	چه‌میکێ	Kanî Masî
	جدیدکا	Kanî Masî
	تیله‌ر ژێری و ژووری	Kanî Masî
	تی شه‌مبیک	Kanî Masî
	تشیش	Kanî Masî
	بێلیزان	Kanî Masî
Bîk Dawide	بیک داوده‌	Kanî Masî
	بێقولکێ	Kanî Masî
	بێشیلێ	Kanî Masî
	بیرکا	Kanî Masî
	بێدهێ	Kanî Masî
	به‌ناڤیا	Kanî Masî
	بریفکا	Kanî Masî
	به‌ربویرێ	Kanî Masî
Bêtenurê	بێته‌نورێ	Kanî Masî
	بالوله‌	Kanî Masî
	بالوکا	Kanî Masî
	بازێ	Kanî Masî
	بارزانک	Kanî Masî
	باتیفا سه‌یدا	Kanî Masî
	ئێکماله‌	Kanî Masî
	یاتێ	Kanî Masî
	ئورمانا	Kanî Masî
	ئورمه‌داودا	Kanî Masî
	ئوره‌	Kanî Masî
	ئه‌لکیشک	Kanî Masî
	زه‌که‌ریا واسهێ	Kanî Masî
	ئه‌دن	Kanî Masî
	چه‌قه‌ل ژوری	Kanî Masî
	دشێش	Kanî Masî
	ئاڤسارکێ	Kanî Masî
	بوتارا	Kanî Masî
	جبل کانیا	Kanî Masî
	ڕویبارکێ	Kanî Masî
	خشانک	Kanî Masî
	سپیندارێ	Kanî Masî
	بریفکا	Kanî Masî
	گاره‌	Kanî Masî
	مه‌غربیا	Kanî Masî
	مه‌همه‌	Kanî Masî
	مێرگه‌میر	Kanî Masî
Dêrelûk	دێره‌لوک	Dêrelûk
	شێلادزێ	Dêrelûk
	سیریێ	Dêrelûk
	بادان	Dêrelûk
	وه‌ره‌خه‌ل	Dêrelûk
	هیل	Dêrelûk
	ویلا و هێتیت	Dêrelûk
	هولیان	Dêrelûk
	هوسێ	Dêrelûk
	هۆره‌	Dêrelûk
	هنش	Dêrelûk
	هه‌سن به‌کرا	Dêrelûk
	هریاش	Dêrelûk
	هاریکا شێخا	Dêrelûk
	هاریکا ئاغا	Dêrelûk
	نێروه‌ک سیتو	Dêrelûk
	نێروه‌ ژێری	Dêrelûk
	مێز	Dêrelûk
	مێرگێ	Dêrelûk
	مه‌یدان	Dêrelûk
	مێر یاڤا	Dêrelûk
	مه‌هیدێ	Dêrelûk
	سپیندار خه‌لفو	Dêrelûk
	مروانس	Dêrelûk
	مامیسا	Dêrelûk
	مازیێ	Dêrelûk
	سوریان	Dêrelûk
	کێریا دێرێ	Dêrelûk
	که‌رۆ	Dêrelûk
	گێرگاش	Dêrelûk
	کانی سارک	Dêrelûk
	کاروک	Dêrelûk
	گاره‌	Dêrelûk
	قه‌سرکێ	Dêrelûk
	گوهه‌رز	Dêrelûk
	گوڵن	Dêrelûk
	بێزه‌لێ کوکه‌رێ سارکێ بیکر و دهیک	Dêrelûk
	کاڤلکا	Dêrelûk
	شیڤیێ	Dêrelûk
	شێرانه‌	Dêrelûk
	شێخ مه‌ما	Dêrelûk
	شه‌تینس	Dêrelûk
	شابه‌که‌ما	Dêrelûk
	شامکێ	Dêrelûk
	پێپه‌رخا و شاجا	Dêrelûk
	سیریێ	Dêrelûk
	سوریان ژووری	Dêrelûk
	سیدان	Dêrelûk
	سیته‌	Dêrelûk
	سنجێ	Dêrelûk
	سگێرێ	Dêrelûk
	سه‌رنی	Dêrelûk
	سپێر	Dêrelûk
	سپێ	Dêrelûk
	شابه‌ که‌ ما	Dêrelûk
	ساکا	Dêrelûk
	زێوکا	Dêrelûk
	زه‌وکا شێخا	Dêrelûk
	زێوا شکان	Dêrelûk
	زێوا دوسکی	Dêrelûk
	زێوا ژوری	Dêrelûk
	زێر	Dêrelûk
	ڕێشبراخه‌	Dêrelûk
	ڕه‌شانک	Dêrelûk
	ڕشافه‌	Dêrelûk
	ڕزێ	Dêrelûk
	ڕه‌زگه‌	Dêrelûk
	دێرکێ	Dêrelûk
	دوتازا	Dêrelûk
	درکنی	Dêrelûk
	ده‌حلکێ	Dêrelûk
	خالکا	Dêrelûk
	خوارێ	Dêrelûk
	چێ و ڕندێلا	Dêrelûk
	چه‌م تی	Dêrelûk
	چه‌مێ جی	Dêrelûk
	چه‌لکێ	Dêrelûk
	جارمه‌ندا	Dêrelûk
	تتم	Dêrelûk
	بێسه‌ پێ	Dêrelûk
	بێزنوور	Dêrelûk
	بیرێ ڕوژاڤا	Dêrelûk
	بیرڤا	Dêrelûk
	پیران	Dêrelûk
	بێده	Dêrelûk
	بێدفه‌	Dêrelûk
	کرکو	Dêrelûk
	به‌ناڤی	Dêrelûk
	بێبو	Dêrelûk
	پیرهه‌سن	Dêrelûk
	پیراڤده‌لا	Dêrelûk
	بیارێ	Dêrelûk
	به‌نستان	Dêrelûk
	به‌لاڤه‌	Dêrelûk
	به‌رچی	Dêrelûk
	بێتکارێ	Dêrelûk
	باوان	Dêrelûk
	بانسرا	Dêrelûk
	باله‌ سینا	Dêrelûk
	باشێ	Dêrelûk
	باوا ڕێکان	Dêrelûk
	ئاڤا سه‌ری	Dêrelûk
	ئێکمالا به‌رێ گارێ	Dêrelûk
	ئاوکا	Dêrelûk
	سپیندار	Dêrelûk
	ئه‌رتیس	Dêrelûk
	ئه‌لهێ	Dêrelûk
	ئه‌رتش	Dêrelûk
	ئاوکێ	Dêrelûk
	ڕێشمه‌	Dêrelûk
	خاستو ژووری	Dêrelûk
	دێوک	Dêrelûk
	سارکێ	Dêrelûk
	سه‌رو کانی	Dêrelûk
	شنی ژێری	Dêrelûk
	لاتکا	Dêrelûk
	هلورا	Dêrelûk
	گه‌له‌کا	Dêrelûk
Çemanke	چه‌مانکێ	Çemankê
	به‌راش	Çemankê
	هیزانکێ ژێری	Çemankê
	هیزانکێ ژووری	Çemankê
	مێزێ	Çemankê
	میروکێ	Çemankê
	مێریکێ	Çemankê
	ملبرکێ	Çemankê
	مسه‌له‌کا	Çemankê
	کراڤا	Çemankê
	کابێ	Çemankê
	کانیکا	Çemankê
	کانی مازێ	Çemankê
	گه‌ڤه‌رگێ	Çemankê
	چه‌م ڕه‌به‌تکێ	Çemankê
	چه‌ لوکێ خریبکێ	Çemankê
	شلیا	Çemankê
	شکێران	Çemankê
	شکه‌فتێ	Çemankê
	سیانێ	Çemankê
	سیار	Çemankê
	سیار	Çemankê
	سوینکێ	Çemankê
	سوسیا	Çemankê
	سه‌ڤره‌ خراب	Çemankê
	سه‌ڤره‌ ئاڤا	Çemankê
	سپیندارێ	Çemankê
	دێویکێ	Çemankê
	دێرکێ	Çemankê
	ده‌ زگیرا	Çemankê
	خاله‌تا	Çemankê
	هنارکێ	Çemankê
	به‌رکه‌ڤر/گری	Çemankê
	بیلمه‌ندێ	Çemankê
	بێرکیات	Çemankê
	بێباد ئیسلام	Çemankê
	بلمێسکێ	Çemankê
	بلمباس	Çemankê
	باره‌مینکێ	Çemankê
	باخێرێ	Çemankê
	ئه‌لێلێ	Çemankê
	ئه‌رگن	Çemankê
	ئاتوشێ	Çemankê
	سێده‌را	Çemankê
	ژولێ	Çemankê
	هه‌له‌فیێ	Çemankê
Bamernê	بامه‌رنێ	Bamernê
	وه‌رمێلێ	Bamernê
	هه‌مزا	Bamernê
	هه‌سن پیرکا	Bamernê
	ناڤێلا	Bamernê
	گه‌لوه	Bamernê
	گه‌ره‌گوهێ	Bamernê
	کانیکا سپنه‌	Bamernê
	کانی به‌لاڤ	Bamernê
	غلبیش	Bamernê
	گلێ	Bamernê
	شێخ مه‌ما	Bamernê
	شرتێ	Bamernê
	زێوه‌ شیخ پیرموس	Bamernê
	دهێ	Bamernê
	داودیه‌	Bamernê
	چه‌م سیسکێ	Bamernê
	جبل مه‌تین	Bamernê
	تنێ	Bamernê
Araden	بساتین ئه‌رادن نه‌سارا	Bamernê
	بانکا	Bamernê
	بامه‌رنێ ژێری	Bamernê
	باسێ	Bamernê
	بارزانکا	Bamernê
	بابیرێ	Bamernê
	ته‌حلاڤا	Bamernê
	بابگوریا	Bamernê
	ئه‌رزێ	Bamernê
	ئه‌ره‌دن نه‌سارا ناڤین	Bamernê
	ئه‌ره‌دن نه‌سارا ڕوژاڤا	Bamernê
	ئه‌ره‌دن نه‌سارا ژێری	Bamernê
	ئه‌ره‌دن نه‌سارا ژووری	Bamernê
	ئه‌ره‌دن ئیسلام	Bamernê

=== Berdereş District ===
Berdereş District consists of the four sub-districts of Berdereş, Daretû, Ravya and Kelek. Berdereş is the capital of the district.

Name	Official name	Sub-district
Berdereş	به‌رده‌ڕه‌ش	Berdereş
	زمزموک	Berdereş
	شیوه‌ره‌	Berdereş
	ئامیان	Berdereş
	ئامیانوک	Berdereş
	مه‌م و زین	Berdereş
	شورک	Berdereş
	کانیلان	Berdereş
	برده‌ره‌ش بچیک	Berdereş
	داره‌توو	Daretû
	به‌نێنان	Daretû
	که‌ونه‌ باک	Daretû
	به‌نگینه‌	Daretû
	به‌هراوا	Daretû
	بیۆک	Daretû
	تربه‌ سپی	Daretû
	خاروک	Daretû
	گردێم	Daretû
	دحلری	Daretû
	درین بوت	Daretû
	دوسه‌ره‌	Daretû
	دوگندان بچوک	Daretû
	دوگندان مه‌زن	Daretû
	زه‌نگه‌نان	Daretû
	شه‌مسه‌ خر	Daretû
	شێخالک	Daretû
	گورگاڤا	Daretû
	چیازه‌رک	Daretû
	گربده‌و	Daretû
	گرده‌پان که‌بیر	Daretû
	گه‌لوک	Daretû
	کۆراو	Daretû
	گومزه‌رد	Daretû
	مۆریلان	Daretû
	هنجیروک بوت	Daretû
	کانی هرچ	Daretû
	گرده‌پان بچوک	Daretû
	گوله‌ ته‌ته‌ر	Daretû
	ڕوڤیا	Ruvya
	ئێکماله‌	Ruvya
	ئاسنگه‌ران	Ruvya
	ئیسماوه‌ گه‌نج	Ruvya
	ئیسماوه‌	Ruvya
	ئیسماوه‌ علیا	Ruvya
	ئه‌ڵاهێ	Ruvya
	ئومه‌ر سێنان	Ruvya
	بامه‌رزێ	Ruvya
	به‌رده‌ سۆر	Ruvya
	پیربوب	Ruvya
	پیرچاوش	Ruvya
	تۆبزاوه‌	Ruvya
	په‌لاسان	Ruvya
	جه‌نگه‌	Ruvya
	جوجه‌ر بچوک	Ruvya
	جوجه‌ر مه‌زن	Ruvya
	حه‌سه‌نیه‌	Ruvya
	خدره‌ سور	Ruvya
	خراب که‌نگر	Ruvya
	خه‌میس کچک	Ruvya
	دربێسان بچوک	Ruvya
	دربێسان مه‌زن	Ruvya
	دوسته‌ک	Ruvya
	دولیجان بچوک وکه‌نداله‌ سور	Ruvya
	مام بوتان	Ruvya
	دولیجان مه‌زن	Ruvya
	دیناران	Ruvya
	زێلکه‌ عه‌بدولعه‌زیز	Ruvya
	سێگردک	Ruvya
	شێخانوک	Ruvya
	چه‌مه‌	Ruvya
	عه‌لی شانه‌	Ruvya
	قه‌ره‌ناز	Ruvya
	کانی ئه‌سبهان بچوک	Ruvya
	کانی ئه‌سپان مه‌زن	Ruvya
	گربه‌ویل	Ruvya
	گه‌رگه‌جو	Ruvya
	گرێگا	Ruvya
	نه‌زراوه‌	Ruvya
	که‌له‌ک	Kelek
	ئاچ قه‌ڵا گه‌وره‌	Kelek
	ئاچ قه‌ڵا بچوک	Kelek
	(به‌حره‌ (شێرکان	Kelek
	به‌ده‌نه‌ گه‌وره‌	Kelek
	به‌ده‌نه‌ بچوک	Kelek
	ته‌ل ئه‌سوه‌د	Kelek
	ته‌رجله‌	Kelek
	ترکوماس	Kelek
	حه‌سه‌ن شامی	Kelek
	زه‌نگه‌ل	Kelek
	زه‌هره‌ خاتون	Kelek
	سێردینان	Kelek
	شێخه‌ میر ژووری	Kelek
	چه‌مه‌ کور	Kelek
	گه‌زه‌کان	Kelek
	قه‌سرۆک	Kelek
	که‌ڤره‌ سور	Kelek
	گوله‌ بۆر/ توله‌به‌ن	Kelek
	گه‌ویلان	Kelek
	شێخه‌ میر ژێری	Kelek
	مه‌نگوبه‌	Kelek

=== Dihok District ===
Dihok District consists of the three sub-districts of Dihok, Mangeş and Zawîte. Dihok is the capital of the district.

Name	Official name	Sub-district
Dihok	دهۆک	Dihok
Mangeş	مانگێشک	Mangeş
	مانگێشا باکورا ڕوژاڤا	Mangeş
	مانگێشا باکورا ڕوژهه‌ڵت	Mangeş
	مانگێشا باشورا ڕوا	Mangeş
	مانگێشا باشورا ڕوژهه‌ڵت	Mangeş
	ئێکماله‌ خابور	Mangeş
	ناڤاشان	Mangeş
	ئه‌لکیشکێ	Mangeş
Alekîne	ئاله‌کینا	Mangeş
Erda	ئه‌رده‌	Mangeş
Eşankê	ئاشانکێ	Mangeş
Elendê	ئه‌لندکێ	Mangeş
	ئوزمانا	Mangeş
Babuxkê Jûrî	بابوخکا ژووری	Mangeş
Babuxkê Jêrî	بابوخکا ژێری	Mangeş
Bacle	باجلێ خابور	Mangeş
	باڤا وباله‌کا	Mangeş
Banesura	بانه‌سورا	Mangeş
Brohecra	برو حه‌جه‌را	Mangeş
	به‌روشکا باشورا ڕوژهه‌ڵت	Mangeş
	به‌روشکا باکورا ڕوژهه‌ڵت	Mangeş
	به‌روشکا باکورا ڕوژاڤا	Mangeş
	به‌روشکا باشورا ڕوژاڤا	Mangeş
Binde	به‌ندا	Mangeş
Battirşê	بوترشێ	Mangeş
	به‌ر که‌ڤر	Mangeş
	پێزیک و شکفتا ڕه‌ش	Mangeş
Bêsfikê Jêrî	بێسفکا ژێری	Mangeş
Bêsfikê Jorî	بێسفکا ژووری	Mangeş
Bêşînkê	بێشینکێ	Mangeş
Tilakro	تلاکرو	Mangeş
Hucava	حوجاڤا وکه‌ربلێ	Mangeş
Dergela Şêxan	ده‌رگه‌ل شێخ	Mangeş
	دوخرکێ	Mangeş
Doliya	دولیا	Mangeş
Dêrgijnîkê	دێرگژنیکێ	Mangeş
Dêrkê	دێرکێ	Mangeş
Rasileyn	ڕه‌یساعه‌ین	Mangeş
Zirhewa	زرهه‌وا	Mangeş
Zivinkê	زڤنگێ	Mangeş
Zorawa	زوراڤا	Mangeş
	زێدک	Mangeş
Zînawa	زیناڤا	Mangeş
Zêwka Ebuyî	زێوکا عه‌بو	Mangeş
Zêwka Kendala	زێوکا که‌ندال	Mangeş
Seravkê	سه‌ر ئافکێ	Mangeş
Şawrîkê	شاوریک	Mangeş
	شه‌مره‌ح	Mangeş
	سادیێ	Mangeş
Çîran	چران	Mangeş
Çemtirê	چه‌م تر	Mangeş
	گه‌ربه‌رازکێ	Mangeş
	گرێ بتێ	Mangeş
	گلناسکێ	Mangeş
	که‌مه‌کا	Mangeş
	کرێمێ به‌رواری	Mangeş
	کرێمێ شیرالی	Mangeş
	کوڤلێ	Mangeş
	گوند کوسه‌	Mangeş
	گوندک نه‌بی	Mangeş
	مجلمه‌خت	Mangeş
	ناڤ شکه‌	Mangeş
	مڵ همبانێ	Mangeş
	ناڤشکێ	Mangeş
Zawîte	زاویته‌	Zawîte
	کومه‌لگه‌ها باگێڕا	Zawîte
	کومه‌لگه‌ها کوڕێت گاڤنا	Zawîte
	خورپنی	Zawîte
	سپیاف	Zawîte
	ئه‌ڤریکا ژووری ئو ژێری	Zawîte
	ئێکماله‌	Zawîte
	ئێمینکێ	Zawîte
	ئاڤلیاس	Zawîte
	بابلو	Zawîte
	باجلور	Zawîte
	باخرنیفێ	Zawîte
	بادێ	Zawîte
	بازێرکێ	Zawîte
	باکوز	Zawîte
	بانی	Zawîte
	برجینێ	Zawîte
	به‌ڕوشکێ سێفێ	Zawîte
	به‌رێ بهار	Zawîte
	پشتگری	Zawîte
	بهێرێ	Zawîte
	بوتیا	Zawîte
	بێده‌	Zawîte
	پیره‌فات خراب	Zawîte
	پیرموس	Zawîte
	بێسکێ	Zawîte
	بێتاس	Zawîte
	پیره‌فات	Zawîte
	پیرومه‌را	Zawîte
	خازیاڤا	Zawîte
	خرابیا	Zawîte
	خروه‌	Zawîte
	ده‌رگه‌ل گرسیس	Zawîte
	دێر ئالوش	Zawîte
	ڕه‌شانکێ	Zawîte
	ڕه‌شاور	Zawîte
	زاویتا ژووری	Zawîte
	زێوه‌ شه‌فیق	Zawîte
	ستکورکێ	Zawîte
	سه‌رمێسکێ	Zawîte
	سندور	Zawîte
	سارکێ	Zawîte
	سوریا	Zawîte
	چه‌ڤریک	Zawîte
	چه‌مان	Zawîte
	چه‌رماڤا سه‌عید ئاغا	Zawîte
	گرێ قه‌سروک	Zawîte
	ته‌لوه‌	Zawîte
	غلبوک	Zawîte
	قارقاراڤا	Zawîte
	قه‌ره‌شو	Zawîte
	کابێرکێ	Zawîte
	کزو	Zawîte
	که‌ڤله‌سنێ	Zawîte
	کوره‌ دێرێ	Zawîte
	لومانا	Zawîte
	لیناڤا	Zawîte
	مه‌رینا	Zawîte
	مه‌مانێ	Zawîte
	میرگه‌ هه‌ڵێ	Zawîte
	مێسکێ	Zawîte

=== Sêmêl District ===
Sêmêl District consists of the three sub-districts of Sêmêl, Batîl and Fayda. The city of Sêmêl is the capital of the district.

Name	Official name	Sub-district
Sêmêl	سێمێل	Sêmêl
	قه‌سر یێزدین	Sêmêl
	مه‌رینا	Sêmêl
	باترشا	Sêmêl
	تل زید	Sêmêl
Çilwan	چه‌لوان	Sêmêl
	به‌ده‌لیا	Sêmêl
Basriyan	بوسریان	Sêmêl
Hewşkê	حه‌وشک	Sêmêl
Darê	دارێ	Sêmêl
	دلب	Sêmêl
	سه‌رشور	Sêmêl
Tengedulip	ته‌نگه‌ دلب	Sêmêl
	سه‌روکانی	Sêmêl
	شێزێ	Sêmêl
	سورکا	Sêmêl
Çempaşayî	چه‌م پاشایێ	Sêmêl
	گه‌رماڤا محمه‌د ئاغا	Sêmêl
	گرێ گه‌ور	Sêmêl
	قه‌شه‌فر ڕوژاڤا	Sêmêl
	قه‌شه‌فر ڕوژهه‌ڵت	Sêmêl
	قوتێ	Sêmêl
	کانی سپی	Sêmêl
	که‌ردیس	Sêmêl
	گرفیل	Sêmêl
	گوتبه‌	Sêmêl
	کلێبین	Sêmêl
	موقبلێ	Sêmêl
	کواشێ	Sêmêl
	کێڤلان	Sêmêl
	ماڤان	Sêmêl
	هاجسنی	Sêmêl
	هژیرکێ	Sêmêl
	هه‌ورێسک	Sêmêl
	ئاڤ ته‌حل	Sêmêl
	شکه‌فتکێ	Sêmêl
	ئشکه‌فتکێ	Sêmêl
Fayda	فایده‌	Faydê
Xankê	خانک	Faydê
	ڕوز	Faydê
	زاوا	Faydê
	که‌به‌رتو	Faydê
	ڕبێبیه‌	Faydê
Baxitmê	باختمێ	Faydê
Alukê	ئالوکا	Faydê
	خیراوا	Faydê
	ڕه‌حمانیه‌	Faydê
	قه‌لعه‌ به‌درێ	Faydê
Şariya	شاریا	Faydê
	مام شڤان	Faydê
	کزک	Faydê
	نه‌مریک	Faydê
	گرێ په‌حن	Faydê
	که‌مونه‌	Faydê
	تلخشف	Faydê
	ساله‌هیێ	Faydê
	دوسته‌کا	Faydê
	کانی گوڵن	Faydê
	سیتک	Faydê
	ڕکاڤا	Faydê
	خرشێنیا	Faydê
	سینا ڕوژاڤا	Faydê
	سینا ڕوژهه‌ڵت	Faydê
	قبخ	Faydê
	ملێخیێ	Faydê
	کوزبل	Faydê
	چه‌م ڕه‌ش	Faydê
	چه‌م به‌ره‌کات	Faydê
	گرێ شکه‌ستی	Faydê
	جه‌به‌ل ڕکاڤا	Faydê
	بازه‌لان	Faydê
	شێخ خدرێ	Faydê
	کانی شرین	Faydê
	باتيل	Batîl
	مێرگه‌سور	Batîl
Avzirîk Jûrî	گرگل و ئاڤزریک ژووری	Batîl
	ئیسماعیل ئاڤا	Batîl
	ئاسهێ	Batîl
	شکه‌ڤده‌ل	Batîl
Avzirîk Mîrî	ئاڤزریک میری	Batîl
	ئێمه‌لک	Batîl
	ئێنجکا سور	Batîl
	ئشکه‌فته‌	Batîl
	ئافخان	Batîl
	باجد به‌راڤ	Batîl
	باجد که‌ندال	Batîl
	باجد میری	Batîl
Basitkê jûrî	باستکێ ژووری	Batîl
Basitkê jêrî	باستکێ ژێری	Batîl
	باڤیا	Batîl
	بالقوس	Batîl
	بامێر	Batîl
	باوه‌ردێ	Batîl
	به‌راڤ	Batîl
	به‌راڤوک	Batîl
	به‌غلوجه‌	Batîl
	پێبزنێ	Batîl
	پێچه‌ک ژووری	Batîl
	پێچه‌ک ژێری	Batîl
	ترکژا	Batîl
	توسانا	Batîl
	چیایێ بێخێر ڕوژهه‌ڵت	Batîl
	چیایێ بێخێر ڕوژاڤا	Batîl
	جوبانیێ	Batîl
	حه‌زاز	Batîl
	خانته‌وه‌ر	Batîl
	خراب دێم	Batîl
	خراب مالک	Batîl
	خربه‌ نور	Batîl
	سولاڤ	Batîl
	شه‌کراڤا	Batîl
	سوریا	Batîl
	چیمه‌نیا	Batîl
	گرعابور	Batîl
	گرشین	Batîl
	گروسمان	Batîl
	قادیا	Batîl
	قه‌رقیر	Batîl
	قه‌سر مه‌لا ته‌یب	Batîl
	کاڤل درێژ	Batîl
	کانی که‌رک	Batîl
	گر ڕه‌ش	Batîl
	کیزینیا تریه‌ سپی	Batîl
	که‌روێنیێ	Batîl
	که‌شکان	Batîl
	کولێ	Batîl
	کومبل	Batîl
	کێلک	Batîl
	کیله‌ سپی	Batîl
	مال هه‌سن	Batîl
	مه‌زرێ	Batîl
	مشارا	Batîl
	هاجیا	Batîl
	هه‌فشێ ڕه‌ش	Batîl

=== Şêxan District ===
Şêxan District consists of the three sub-districts of Şêxan, Qesrok, Etrîş and Zîlkan. The city of Şêxan is the capital of the district.

Name	Official name	Sub-district
Şêxan	شێخان	Şêxan
	عین سفنێ ڕوژهه‌ڵات	Şêxan
	ئاشکاجفته‌	Şêxan
	باسڤنێ	Şêxan
	باقه‌سرێ	Şêxan
	بێتنار	Şêxan
	پیربیب	Şêxan
	پیران شێخان	Şêxan
	جروانه‌	Şêxan
	جفته‌	Şêxan
	داربه‌ستا	Şêxan
	ڕکابه‌ حه‌مدان	Şêxan
	شێخ مه‌لوان	Şêxan
	شیڤ شرین	Şêxan
	کێتک	Şêxan
	گرخالس	Şêxan
	گر مبارک	Şêxan
	گه‌لیێ خودێدا	Şêxan
	کیس قه‌لعه‌	Şêxan
	مام ڕه‌شان	Şêxan
	نێرگزلیه‌	Şêxan
	ئێسفنێ باشور	Şêxan
	ئێسفنێ باکور	Şêxan
	قه‌سروک	Qesrok
	چره‌	Qesrok
	که‌له‌کچی	Qesrok
	که‌ڤره‌ سور	Qesrok
	ئاشکان	Qesrok
	ئاڤده‌لێ	Qesrok
	باجله‌	Qesrok
	باڤیان	Qesrok
	به‌ره‌شا	Qesrok
	به‌رگر	Qesrok
	به‌رکچک	Qesrok
	بیباڤا	Qesrok
	بێساتا خارێ	Qesrok
	بێساتا سه‌ری	Qesrok
	ته‌ل جومر	Qesrok
	تلبزینه‌	Qesrok
	خرابا شه‌ره‌فا	Qesrok
	داره‌تو خازر	Qesrok
	درین	Qesrok
	دریشان	Qesrok
	ڕویلک	Qesrok
	زیناڤا	Qesrok
	زیناڤا غازی	Qesrok
	زیناڤا میری	Qesrok
	سێلکا	Qesrok
	شێفکا	Qesrok
	شێخکا ئیسلام باشور	Qesrok
	گرزه‌نگل	Qesrok
	گرک سوباشی	Qesrok
	گه‌رمیشان	Qesrok
	کانی فه‌لا	Qesrok
	ده‌حله‌پان	Qesrok
	گه‌رمک کچکه	Qesrok
	گه‌رمک مه‌زن	Qesrok
	کفرێ وچه‌م هه‌رزن	Qesrok
	که‌مێ	Qesrok
	که‌ندێ	Qesrok
	کوپێ	Qesrok
	کوخی	Qesrok
	مرێبا	Qesrok
	مه‌لا بروان	Qesrok
	شێخکا ئیسلام	Qesrok
	سێگرک شه‌ره‌فان	Qesrok
	چیایێ مرێبا	Qesrok
	جبل بێسات سه‌ری و خواری	Qesrok
	چره‌	Qesrok
	ئه‌تریش	Etrîş
	ئازاح	Etrîş
	ئاساس	Etrîş
	ئافریڤا	Etrîş
	ئالوکا	Etrîş
	ئسته‌نڤین	Etrîş
	بادیناگا	Etrîş
	باساوا	Etrîş
	باسفرێ	Etrîş
	باسکه‌ دێر	Etrîş
	بافکێ	Etrîş
	باله‌ته‌	Etrîş
	به‌ربیرێ	Etrîş
	به‌ره‌تین	Etrîş
	بریفکا	Etrîş
	بلان	Etrîş
	بنگه‌لی	Etrîş
	به‌ستاڤا	Etrîş
	بێبوزێ	Etrîş
	بێدول	Etrîş
	بیرێ	Etrîş
	بێگه‌ه	Etrîş
	بێنارینکێ	Etrîş
	تلدێف	Etrîş
	تله‌	Etrîş
	توسب	Etrîş
	خه‌تارا	Etrîş
	خه‌نس	Etrîş
	خه‌رزا	Etrîş
	خورتا بچیک	Etrîş
	خورتا مه‌زن	Etrîş
	خورکێ	Etrîş
	ده‌حلێ نوی	Etrîş
	دزێ	Etrîş
	ده‌کان	Etrîş
	دێره‌ خدرێ	Etrîş
	ڕه‌به‌تکێ	Etrîş
	زێوه‌	Etrîş
	سه‌رکاف	Etrîş
	شکه‌فت هندیا	Etrîş
	شه‌هیا	Etrîş
	گه‌لیێ ڕمان	Etrîş
	گه‌لیکێ	Etrîş
	ڕکاڤا	Etrîş
	کانیا باسکا	Etrîş
	گڤارا	Etrîş
	که‌لێنیێ	Etrîş
	کێفسن	Etrîş
Laliş	(لالش (شیخ عادی	Etrîş
	مغارا	Etrîş
	ملکێشان	Etrîş
	میتکا ژوری	Etrîş
	میتکا ژێری	Etrîş
	مێرسیدا	Etrîş
	مێرگه‌بیێ	Etrîş
	میسه‌کا وقف	Etrîş
	نسرا	Etrîş
	نوردیناڤا	Etrîş
	نێروه‌ک	Etrîş
	هارینا	Etrîş
Armash	هه‌رماش	Etrîş
	هه‌سنه‌کا	Etrîş
	مکێرس	Etrîş
	که‌ریم ئاڤا	Etrîş
	کبێ	Etrîş
	یوسف جه‌عفه‌ر	Etrîş
	بلکێف	Etrîş
	بێدارک	Etrîş
	باتڤرێ	Etrîş
	نێرگزتیک	Etrîş
	دێریشکێ ڕوبال	Etrîş
	بهیک	Etrîş
	نزیرکێ	Etrîş
	شرین ئاڤا	Etrîş
	زیرێ	Etrîş
	گه‌لیێ مام سنکێ	Etrîş
	بیرمادینا	Etrîş
	چیایێ شێخ عادی	Etrîş
	بێشار	Etrîş
	زيلكان	Zîlkan
	باباو	Zîlkan
	ئه‌لعه‌بدالیه‌	Zîlkan
	(به‌رازی بچوک (روژ هه‌ڵت	Zîlkan
	(به‌رازی بچوک (روژ ئاڤا	Zîlkan
	به‌رازی مه‌زن	Zîlkan
	پیران مه‌قلوب	Zîlkan
	خاتیناوه‌	Zîlkan
	ڕکابه‌ حه‌مدان	Zîlkan
	سێکرک	Zîlkan
	چه‌م ڕه‌ش	Zîlkan
	تاق حه‌رب	Zîlkan
	تاق حه‌مه‌	Zîlkan
	تاق میکایل	Zîlkan
	قه‌یماوه‌	Zîlkan
	کانی ساردک	Zîlkan
	کرفه‌قیر	Zîlkan
	کله‌شین	Zîlkan
	که‌نداله‌	Zîlkan
	محمه‌د ڕه‌شان	Zîlkan
	مه‌حمودان	Zîlkan
	موقبلێ	Zîlkan
	مه‌هه‌ت	Zîlkan
	موسه‌کان	Zîlkan
	نێچه‌ری	Zîlkan
	هنجیروک	Zîlkan
Ba'adra	باعه‌درێ	Ba'edrê
	شکه‌فتیان	Ba'edrê
	ئیسیان	Ba'edrê
	ئالمه‌مان	Ba'edrê
	بێرسته‌ک	Ba'edrê
	دوشیڤان	Ba'edrê
	دێرکێ	Ba'edrê
	زهێرا	Ba'edrê
	شێخ هه‌سن	Ba'edrê
	مامزدین	Ba'edrê
	حسنیه‌	Ba'edrê
	بیوز خارێ	Ba'edrê
	بیوز سه‌ری	Ba'edrê
	جه‌به‌ل زهیرا	Ba'edrê

=== Zaxo District ===
Zaxo District consists of the four sub-districts of Zaxo, Rizgarî, Derkar and Batîfa. The city of Zaxo is the capital of the district.

Name	Official name	Sub-district
Zaxo	زاخۆ	Zaxo
Rizgarî	ڕزگاری	Rizgarî
Ermiştê	ئه‌رمشت	Rizgarî
Afirme	ئافرما	Rizgarî
Bakirme	باکرما	Rizgarî
Berkevir Xabur	به‌رکه‌ڤر خابور	Rizgarî
Bêtas	بێتاس	Rizgarî
Bêzal	بێزال	Rizgarî
Bêzuhe	بێزهێ	Rizgarî
Titawkê	تاووک	Rizgarî
Çem Misilmet û Temerava	چه‌م مسلمه‌ت و ته‌مه‌راڤا	Rizgarî
Tuyanê	تویان	Rizgarî
Hesenava	حه‌سه‌ن ئاڤا	Rizgarî
Xirab Babik	خراب بابک	Rizgarî
Xirab Darkê	خراب دار	Rizgarî
Xwalêş	خوالش	Rizgarî
Xîlaftê	خیلافته‌	Rizgarî
Hêleh	حێله‌ح	Rizgarî
Darhuzanê	دار هوزان	Rizgarî
Deşita Jûrî û Jêrî	ده‌شتا ژووری و ژێری	Rizgarî
Dubankê	دوبانک	Rizgarî
Dolê	دولا	Rizgarî
Dêrebûn	دێره‌بون	Rizgarî
Mizrê Xabur	مه‌زرێ خابور	Rizgarî
Dêrînik	دێرینک	Rizgarî
Şînava	شیناڤا	Rizgarî
Selka	سه‌لکا	Rizgarî
Çem Bahîf	چه‌م باهیف	Rizgarî
Çem Sîrmo	چه‌م سیرمۆ	Rizgarî
Çem Kurkê	چه‌م کورک	Rizgarî
Girzêwk	گر زێوک	Rizgarî
Girk Sindî Jêrî û Jûrî	گرک سندی ژێری و ژووری	Rizgarî
Pêşabîrê	فیشخابور	Rizgarî
Qerewila	قه‌ره‌ولا	Rizgarî
Kani Sarkê	کانی سارکێ	Rizgarî
Mamir	مامر	Rizgarî
Harînê	هارونا	Rizgarî
Hêstiyan	هێتیان	Rizgarî
Cusq	جوسق	Rizgarî
Derkar	ده‌ركار	Derkar
Bêrsfê	بێرسفێ	Derkar
Hîzawa	هیزاوا	Derkar
Îstebilat	ئسته‌بلان	Derkar
Berizwîr	به‌رزور	Derkar
Behrava	به‌هراڤا	Derkar
Têrik Smo	تیرک سمۆ	Derkar
Têrik Arab	تیرک عه‌ره‌ب	Derkar
Têrik Mam	تێرک مام یه‌زدین	Derkar
Derkar Nêrî	ده‌رکار نێری	Derkar
Deşit Mask	ده‌شت ماسک	Derkar
Dercelal	ده‌رجه‌لال	Derkar
Durnexê	دورنه‌ح	Derkar
Kernê	که‌رنی	Derkar
Sersîlavkê	سه‌ر سولاڤ	Derkar
Serko	سه‌رکو	Derkar
Şeraniş Felan	شرانش ئیسلام	Derkar
Şeraniş Îslam	شرانش نساری	Derkar
Gundik Eyub	گوندک ئه‌یوب	Derkar
Gundik Mela	گوندک مه‌لا	Derkar
Emer Axa	عه‌مه‌ر ئاغا	Derkar
Qesruk	قه‌سروک	Derkar
Keberuk	که‌به‌روک	Derkar
Çem Mişku	چه‌م مشکو	Derkar
Mitîfa	متیفا	Derkar
Mêrge Şîş	مێرگه‌ شیش	Derkar
Mêrgê	مێرگێ	Derkar
Nurdîna	نوردینا	Derkar
Hewrêz	هه‌ورێز	Derkar
Ava Gwîzê	ئاڤا گویزێ	Derkar
Êrê	ئێرێ	Derkar
Elaniş	ئه‌لانش	Derkar
Bêşilkê	بێشیلک	Derkar
Bihêrê	بهێرێ	Derkar
Bazingîra	بازنگیرا	Derkar
Behnuney Sindi	به‌هنونه‌	Derkar
Bosele	بوسه‌ل	Derkar
Bênxirê	بێنخرێ	Derkar
Betrume	په‌ترومه‌	Derkar
Perex	په‌ره‌ح	Derkar
Dasîkê	داسیک	Derkar
Dêrê	دێرێ	Derkar
Dehlik Melek	ده‌حلک مه‌له‌ک	Derkar
Dehlik Selman	ده‌حلک سه‌لمان	Derkar
Dêreşîş	دێرشیش	Derkar
Deşitetah	ده‌شته‌تاح	Derkar
Zêwk Busel	زێوک بوسه‌ل	Derkar
Senat	سنات	Derkar
Sindava	سنداڤا	Derkar
Gewirk	گه‌ورک	Derkar
Kirikine	کرکرانک	Derkar
Mamîsa	مامیسا	Derkar
Marsîsê	مارسیس	Derkar
Hefşinê	هه‌فشن	Derkar
Yûsifava	یوسف ئاگا	Derkar
Batîfa	باتيفا	Batîfa
Dehlîkê	ده‌حلک	Batîfa
	سیرکوتک	Batîfa
	گری	Batîfa
Xuk Gulî	خوک گولی	Batîfa
Xîzava	خیزاڤا	Batîfa
	ملاعه‌ره‌ب	Batîfa
	ئاگڤه‌نێ	Batîfa
Xuk Sindî	خوک سندی	Batîfa
	ناگکه‌ندال	Batîfa
	لێڤو	Batîfa
	زێوک سندی	Batîfa
Mêrgesorê	مێرگه‌سور	Batîfa
	باگولات	Batîfa
	به‌رکه‌ڤر به‌له‌ک و توکا	Batîfa
	پیره‌کا	Batîfa
	چه‌مکێ دلا	Batîfa
	سپینداروک	Batîfa
	که‌رپت ته‌یمور	Batîfa
	که‌رپت عه‌لی	Batîfa
	هه‌رکوند	Batîfa
	به‌رزوک	Batîfa
	بێغه‌بار	Batîfa
	بلدێشا	Batîfa
	گوڤک ژووری	Batîfa
	گوڤک ژێری	Batîfa
	زێوک گولی	Batîfa
	شێرخاسک	Batîfa
	غولدیا	Batîfa
	بارهول	Batîfa
	ئاڤهێ	Batîfa
	زرێزه‌	Batîfa
	دێریشک و ئاڤا خرابا وبیرکێ	Batîfa
	کانی تووا	Batîfa
	بلێجان	Batîfa
	کورکا	Batîfa
	ڕێوان	Batîfa
	نه‌رمک	Batîfa
	گرێ بیێ	Batîfa
	حه‌فته‌نین	Batîfa
	دێمکا وسه‌رکێ بێسیرێ	Batîfa
	سوریا	Batîfa
	شودن	Batîfa
	ڕویسێ	Batîfa
	نزدور	Batîfa
	ئێکماله‌	Batîfa
	سولێ	Batîfa
	شلین	Batîfa
	شیلان	Batîfa
	که‌شان	Batîfa
	منین	Batîfa
	بانکا ژووری	Batîfa
	بانکا ژێری	Batîfa
	چه‌م کورک	Batîfa
	باندرو	Batîfa
	ئه‌ڤله‌هێ	Batîfa
	پیربلا	Batîfa
	به‌هنونه‌	Batîfa
	که‌لا خارێ	Batîfa
	مه‌رگه‌ه	Batîfa
	خه‌رخه‌پکا	Batîfa
	دره‌نک ئاڤا	Batîfa

== Erbil Governorate ==
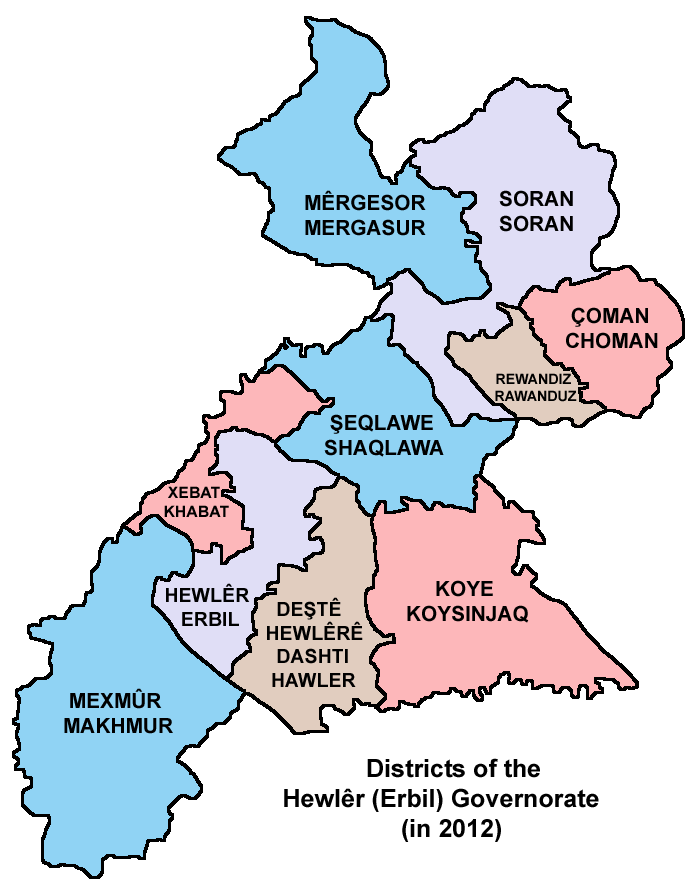
Districts of Erbil Governorate

=== Çoman District ===
Çoman District consists of the three sub-districts of Çoman, Gelale, Qesrê, Haci Omeran and Simîlan. Çoman is the capital of the district.

Name	Official name	Sub-district
Çoman	چۆمان	Çoman
Êne	ئێنه‌	Çoman
Meran	مه‌ران	Çoman
Mindayzan	مژده‌نیان	Çoman
Kewlan	کاولان	Çoman
Sîngore	سینگۆره‌	Çoman
Wîze	وێزه	Çoman
Memî Xellan	مه‌می خه‌ڵان	Çoman
Werde	وه‌رده‌	Çoman
Dêlzê	دێلزێ	Çoman
Konexanan	که‌ونه‌ خانان	Çoman
Kewert	که‌وه‌رته‌	Çoman
Nawberge	ناوبه‌رگه‌	Çoman
Nawpirdan	ناوپردان	Çoman
Kosretan	کۆسره‌تان	Çoman
Şêx Witman	شیخ وه‌تمان	Çoman
Bindayzan	بندایزان	Çoman
Xoşkan	خۆشکان	Çoman
Şêxan	شێخان	Çoman
Şiywelok	شیوه‌ڵۆک	Çoman
Sekran	سکران	Çoman
Goronî	گۆرونی	Çoman
Basan	باسان	Çoman
Gelale	گه‌ڵاله‌	Gelale
Rêzan	ڕێزان	Gelale
Daruselman	دار سلام	Gelale
Gewîzan	گوێزان	Gelale
Omerawe	ئۆمه‌راوه‌	Gelale
Paşkoz	پاشکۆز	Gelale
Nawkêlkan	ناوکێله‌کان	Gelale
Qesrê	قه‌سرێ	Qesrê
Dilman	دێڵمان	Qesrê
Mêrge	مێرگه‌	Qesrê
Weleşî	وه‌لاش	Qesrê
Welize	وه‌ڵزێ	Qesrê
Çome Sek	چۆمساک	Qesrê
Soreban	سۆره‌بان	Qesrê
Makosan	ماکۆسان	Qesrê
Reşdur	ره‌شدور	Qesrê
Zenge Lîn	چۆم و زه‌نگه‌لین	Qesrê
Boran	بوران	Qesrê
Wesanan	وه‌سان	Qesrê
Qelate Simorê	قه‌ڵات	Qesrê
Xezîne	خه‌زێنه‌	Qesrê
Kewlan	کوێله‌	Qesrê
Haci Omeran	حاج ئۆمه‌ران	Haci Omeran
Şiywerreş	شیوه‌ره‌ش	Haci Omeran
Mawetan	ماوه‌تان	Haci Omeran
Zînwê	زینو شیخ	Haci Omeran
Xalan	خه‌ڵان	Haci Omeran
Sersul	سه‌رسول	Haci Omeran
Allane	ئاڵانه‌	Haci Omeran
Kîkan	کیکان	Haci Omeran
Warşeng	وارشه‌نگه‌	Haci Omeran
Weregurg	وارگورگ	Haci Omeran
Rayat	ڕایات	Haci Omeran
Darbend	ده‌ربه‌ند	Haci Omeran
Berdespiyan	به‌رده‌ سپیان	Haci Omeran
Gunde Jûr	گونده‌ژوور	Haci Omeran
Gela Lejîr	گله‌ژێر	Haci Omeran
Şore	شۆره‌	Haci Omeran
Dole Bon	دۆله‌ بون	Haci Omeran
Nawende	ناوه‌نده‌‌‌	Haci Omeran
Simîlan	سمێڵان	Simîlan
Şêrkawe	شێرکاوه‌	Simîlan
Gewîz Lînge	گویزلنگه‌	Simîlan
Mawan	ماوان	Simîlan
Mame Xetîbiyan	مامه‌ خه‌تیبان	Simîlan
Heblesan	هه‌بره‌سان	Simîlan
Çombaluk	چۆمباروک	Simîlan
Çoman Simayl Axa	چۆمان سمایل ئاغا	Simîlan
Çaweke	چاوه‌که‌	Simîlan
Dollbalîs	دولبالیس	Simîlan
Êyşe	ێیشه‌‌	Simîlan
Girze	گزره‌	Simîlan
Gezane	گه‌زنه‌	Simîlan
Kewlan	کاولان	Simîlan
Girtîk	گرتک	Simîlan
Dolane	دۆلانه‌	Simîlan
Rustê	ڕۆست	Simîlan
Pîr Omer	پیر ئۆمه‌ر	Simîlan
Sirêşme	سه‌رێشمه‌	Simîlan

=== Daşti Hewlêr District ===
Daşti Hewlêr District consists of the three sub-districts of Daretû, Quştepe and Kesnezan. Daretû is the capital of the district.

Name	Official name	Sub-district
Daretû	داره‌توو	Daretû
	گرده‌ڕه‌شه‌ موفتى	Daretû
	گرده‌ڕه‌شه‌ ئه‌سعه‌د	Daretû
	باغه‌مره‌ شه‌هاب	Daretû
	باغه‌مره‌ ئه‌فه‌ندى	Daretû
	مورتكه‌	Daretû
	ميرزا ئاغا	Daretû
	پاڵانيان	Daretû
	هه‌ڵه‌جه‌ى گه‌وره‌	Daretû
	هه‌ڵه‌جه‌ى بچووك	Daretû
	بێستانه‌ى گه‌وره‌	Daretû
	سه‌رمه‌زرا	Daretû
	سه‌رده‌شت	Daretû
	سابلاغ	Daretû
	بێستانه‌ى بچووك	Daretû
	ئۆمه‌ره‌ سۆر	Daretû
	لاجان	Daretû
	پيره‌جنه‌	Daretû
Quştepe	قوشته‌په‌	Quştepe
	كوپه‌قران	Quştepe
	عه‌لياوه‌ مه‌ردان	Quştepe
	قوچه‌ بلباس	Quştepe
	قوشته‌په‌ى گه‌وره‌	Quştepe
	برايم له‌ك	Quştepe
	گۆسكه‌	Quştepe
	ميرخوزار	Quştepe
	پلينگه‌	Quştepe
	دووگردكان	Quştepe
	سێبيران عه‌دۆ	Quştepe
	دووكه‌ڵه‌	Quştepe
	قازى خانه‌	Quştepe
	سۆربه‌ش خدر	Quştepe
	قوشاغلو	Quştepe
	قه‌رچناغه‌	Quştepe
	مورتكه‌ شهاب	Quştepe
	گرد مه‌لا	Quştepe
	قوڵته‌په‌ ره‌شيد	Quştepe
	پيره‌ عاره‌بان	Quştepe
	كه‌ر دز	Quştepe
	كه‌ر زۆر	Quştepe
	چێله‌ به‌شه‌	Quştepe
	هه‌مزه‌ كۆر	Quştepe
	دۆله‌ به‌كره‌	Quştepe
	سيناله‌	Quştepe
	گۆمه‌ گروو	Quştepe
	گه‌ڕه‌ شێخان	Quştepe
	دۆله‌زه‌	Quştepe
	عه‌لياوه‌ گرده‌ شينه‌	Quştepe
	ئۆمه‌راوه‌	Quştepe
	پۆريجه‌	Quştepe
	ميره‌كان شێخ ئه‌فه‌ندى	Quştepe
	دووشيوان	Quştepe
	كانى بزره‌	Quştepe
	ميره‌كان خدر	Quştepe
	ڕولكه‌	Quştepe
	حه‌سه‌ن موترب	Quştepe
	سۆفي برايم	Quştepe
	چاڵه‌ گرده‌له‌	Quştepe
	ئازيانه‌	Quştepe
	گرده‌ سۆر گه‌وره‌ + كچكه‌	Quştepe
	گردلانكه‌	Quştepe
	ته‌تراوه‌	Quştepe
	ئۆمه‌ر مامه‌كه‌	Quştepe
	ئلينجاغ	Quştepe
	قوڵته‌په‌ يابه‌	Quştepe
	باشته‌په‌	Quştepe
	سێ قوچان	Quştepe
	شێخانان	Quştepe
	تۆبزاوه‌	Quştepe
	شێراوه‌	Quştepe
	مه‌خشومه‌	Quştepe
	قه‌شقه‌	Quştepe
	خورخور	Quştepe
	په‌ڵكانه‌	Quştepe
Kesnezan	كه‌سنه‌زان	Kesnezan
	كۆمه‌ڵگاى مه‌لا ئۆمه‌ر	Kesnezan
	شه‌ره‌بوت	Kesnezan
	شه‌وه‌ك/ مه‌لائومه‌ر	Kesnezan
	كه‌له‌كين	Kesnezan
	كۆله‌ك	Kesnezan
	كۆله‌كى گه‌وره‌	Kesnezan
	زه‌روا	Kesnezan
	قه‌له‌مان/ ئوَخسه‌ر	Kesnezan
	پونگينه‌	Kesnezan
	"هه‌مزه‌ به‌گ/ كورداوه‌/ گرديش/چه‌مرگه‌"	Kesnezan
	كانى گه‌نى	Kesnezan
	بێوكه‌	Kesnezan
	مام چوغان	Kesnezan

=== Hewlêr District ===
Hewlêr consists of the four sub-districts of Hewlêr, Behirke, Enkawa and Şemamok. Hewlêr is the capital of the district.

Name	Official name	Sub-district
Hewlêr	هێولێر	Hewlêr
Behirke	به‌حركه‌	Behirke
	گردجوتيار	Behirke
	گه‌زنه‌	Behirke
	قه‌لان چۆغان	Behirke
	ئاشوكان	Behirke
	داره‌به‌ن	Behirke
	سه‌يدان	Behirke
	مه‌موندان	Behirke
	به‌رحوشتر	Behirke
	گرده‌چاڵ	Behirke
	جێژنيكان	Behirke
	جێژنيكان ئه‌بابكر	Behirke
	گرد ئاره‌ق	Behirke
	قه‌لامورتك	Behirke
	براغ	Behirke
	قه‌فه‌ر/ سه‌ركه‌ور	Behirke
	پيرزين	Behirke
	كۆنه‌ كه‌رك	Behirke
	كه‌له‌كان	Behirke
Enkawa	عه‌نكاوه‌	Enkawa
Şemamok	شه‌مامك	Şemamok
	شه‌معوناوه‌	Şemamok
Turaq	توره‌ق	Şemamok
	باغلو مناره‌	Şemamok
	سوێرى	Şemamok
	عاره‌ب كه‌ند	Şemamok
	تيمارى گه‌وره‌	Şemamok
	سه‌ردار	Şemamok
	مز احمد	Şemamok
	پيره‌بات	Şemamok
	حه‌زا	Şemamok
	قه‌ته‌وى	Şemamok
	تۆبزاوه‌ى احمد	Şemamok
	باترتوق	Şemamok
	دوزته‌په‌	Şemamok
	يارمچه‌ى گه‌وره‌	Şemamok
	ده‌رو گولى سه‌روو	Şemamok
	خه‌زنه‌	Şemamok
	ره‌ختاوه‌	Şemamok
	سيراوه‌	Şemamok
	ماستاوه‌	Şemamok
	ته‌ندوره‌	Şemamok
	چيمه‌ن	Şemamok
	داڵداغان	Şemamok
	قوريتان على محمود	Şemamok
	قۆريتان چوكل	Şemamok
	شێراوه‌	Şemamok
	جمكه‌	Şemamok
	قه‌ريتاغ	Şemamok
	بنبێرس	Şemamok
	سه‌عداوه‌	Şemamok
	دهێمات	Şemamok
	قشله‌	Şemamok
	شێخ شێروان	Şemamok
	سياو	Şemamok
	دوسه‌ره‌ جبار	Şemamok
	باقرته‌	Şemamok
	مناره‌	Şemamok
	جديده‌ له‌ك	Şemamok
	ئاوده‌لۆك	Şemamok
	هێله‌وه‌	Şemamok
	كه‌سنه‌زان	Şemamok
	عه‌لياوه‌ى شێخان	Şemamok
	گرد عازه‌بان	Şemamok
	دۆغان	Şemamok
	كلێسه‌	Şemamok
	سۆربه‌ش حه‌وێز	Şemamok
	سۆربه‌ش كاكه‌ڵه‌	Şemamok
	سورێژه‌	Şemamok
	ترپه‌ سپيان	Şemamok
	يه‌دي قزله‌ر	Şemamok
	ئه‌سحابه‌ له‌ك	Şemamok

=== Koye District ===
Koye District consists of the four sub-districts of Koye, Teq Teq, Şoriş, Aşîtî, Sitkan and Segirdkan. Koye is the capital of the district.

Name	Official name	Sub-district
Koye	كۆيه‌	Koye
	تۆبزاوه‌	Koye
	هه‌رمۆته‌	Koye
	شيله‌	Koye
	مام قلينج	Koye
	كێله‌ سپي	Koye
	شيخ ئه‌لوان	Koye
	يارميش	Koye
	عه‌بدالان	Koye
	داره‌ مه‌زن	Koye
	شه‌وگێر	Koye
	قۆريتان	Koye
	باجاوان	Koye
	پێبازۆك	Koye
	دۆندار	Koye
	تيمارۆك	Koye
	كفره‌ دوڵ	Koye
	بامورتكان	Koye
	حاجى قه‌ڵا	Koye
	سێوه‌سه‌ن	Koye
	ئاسكى كۆيه‌	Koye
	قه‌يسه‌رى	Koye
	هه‌واوان	Koye
	مام مه‌حموده‌	Koye
	حه‌مه‌ بايزان	Koye
	كافرۆشيان	Koye
	داربه‌ڕوو	Koye
	ئاوده‌لۆك	Koye
	كرۆژ	Koye
	فه‌قێيان	Koye
	مير سه‌يد	Koye
	كانى كه‌ند / چنارۆك	Koye
	سوسێ	Koye
	گرتك جه‌لي	Koye
	سماقۆلى سه‌رووچاوه‌	Koye
	سماقۆلى گرتك	Koye
	سماقۆلى گه‌لى	Koye
	سێنان	Koye
Teq Teq	ته‌ق ته‌ق	Teq Teq
	گه‌رمك ته‌ق ته‌ق	Teq Teq
	تاڵه‌بانى گه‌وره‌	Teq Teq
	كانى له‌له‌	Teq Teq
	ئيلينجاغى گه‌وره‌	Teq Teq
	ئيلينجاغى بچوك	Teq Teq
	شيواشۆك خه‌له‌ف	Teq Teq
	تاڵه‌بانى بچوك	Teq Teq
	كانى ڕه‌ش	Teq Teq
	كونه‌ گورگ	Teq Teq
	باغه‌ چنێر	Teq Teq
	چۆم حه‌يده‌ر	Teq Teq
	مخرس	Teq Teq
	گرمك ساتو قه‌لا	Teq Teq
	مه‌لا زياد	Teq Teq
	ساتو قه‌لا كارێز	Teq Teq
	شيوه‌ جان	Teq Teq
	ته‌كه‌لتو	Teq Teq
	ناسر ئاغا	Teq Teq
	قوڕه‌ به‌رازى گه‌وره‌	Teq Teq
	قوڕه‌ به‌رازى بچوك	Teq Teq
Şoriş	شۆڕش	Şoriş
	گۆپته‌په‌	Şoriş
	گۆمه‌شين شێخان	Şoriş
	ته‌كه‌ور	Şoriş
	پيره‌ر	Şoriş
	باوه‌قۆپ	Şoriş
	گۆمه‌ تاڵ	Şoriş
	بانه‌ قه‌ڵات گه‌ردى	Şoriş
	كانى سوسكه‌	Şoriş
	ئاخوره‌	Şoriş
	بانه‌مورد	Şoriş
	شيوه‌ پيرات	Şoriş
	ره‌سول بچكۆڵ	Şoriş
	مێرگه‌	Şoriş
	به‌له‌بان	Şoriş
	ته‌لوار	Şoriş
	به‌ردبڕ	Şoriş
	حاجى وسو	Şoriş
	بانى ماران	Şoriş
	بانه‌ قه‌ڵات شێخان	Şoriş
	په‌ڵكه‌ ڕه‌ش	Şoriş
	كانى ده‌ربه‌ند	Şoriş
	سماق شيرينى بچوك	Şoriş
	سماق شيرينى گه‌وره‌	Şoriş
	شاخه‌ پيسكه‌	Şoriş
	گورزه‌ي	Şoriş
	نه‌رگينه‌	Şoriş
	ئاليانه‌	Şoriş
	بايز ئاغا	Şoriş
	باقلين	Şoriş
	سماقه‌	Şoriş
	ئه‌شكه‌وت سه‌قه‌	Şoriş
	داره‌ به‌سري گه‌وره‌	Şoriş
	داره‌ به‌سري بچوك	Şoriş
	كانى كه‌وان	Şoriş
	شيواشۆك قه‌له‌م	Şoriş
	كانى گوند	Şoriş
	كێشكه‌	Şoriş
	ونكه‌	Şoriş
	عه‌لياوه‌	Şoriş
	قورته‌لاس	Şoriş
	كانى بي	Şoriş
Aşîtî	ئاشتى	Aşîtî
	الياسه‌ سور	Aşîtî
	كانى هه‌نجير	Aşîtî
	بانه‌ گوڵان	Aşîtî
	سوره‌ قه‌ڵا	Aşîtî
	قولقوله‌	Aşîtî
	قه‌سر خه‌رابه‌	Aşîtî
	گۆمه‌شين	Aşîtî
	قزلو	Aşîtî
	كانى بي	Aşîtî
	كاولان	Aşîtî
	كێله‌ زيندان	Aşîtî
	بۆگد	Aşîtî
	كلێسه‌	Aşîtî
	كانى سور	Aşîtî
	الا الله	Aşîtî
	كانى كورده‌	Aşîtî
	قازبه‌گيان	Aşîtî
	شيوه‌شان	Aşîtî
	سويره‌لا	Aşîtî
	جه‌لى	Aşîtî
	كاموسك	Aşîtî
	سناوه‌	Aşîtî
	نازه‌نين	Aşîtî
	كۆلكه‌ڕه‌ش	Aşîtî
	كۆده‌لا	Aşîtî
	گردگۆران	Aşîtî
	كونه‌ فلوسه‌	Aşîtî
Siktan	سكتان	Siktan
Segirdkan	سێگردكان	Segirdkan
	ئۆمه‌ر گومبه‌ت	Segirdkan
	سيكانى	Segirdkan
	قه‌مبه‌ر	Segirdkan
	تازه‌دێى گه‌وره‌	Segirdkan
	ناوماڵ	Segirdkan
	سارتك	Segirdkan
	كانى سلێمانه‌	Segirdkan
	به‌رده‌سپي	Segirdkan
	جل به‌سه‌ر	Segirdkan
	نێره‌ گين	Segirdkan

=== Mêrgesor District ===
Mêrgesor District consists of the six sub-districts of Mêrgesor, Barzan, Pîran, Şêrwan Mezin, Meznê and Goretû. Mêrgesor is the capital of the district.

Name	Official name	Sub-district
Mêrgesor	مێرگه‌سور	Mêrgesor
Barzan	بارزان	Barzan
Sevre	سه‌ڤره‌	Barzan
Hîzan	هیزان	Barzan
Hemdile	هه‌مدلا	Barzan
Hesnê	هه‌سنێ	Barzan
Bibana	به‌بانا	Barzan
	هه‌ڤندکا	Barzan
	هه‌سنه‌کا	Barzan
	ڕێشه‌	Barzan
	تێل	Barzan
	مه‌ندیێ	Barzan
	باڵندا	Barzan
	ئاڤه‌دوور	Barzan
	هه‌ڵه‌وین	Barzan
	شنگێل	Barzan
	ڕه‌زیان	Barzan
	سالۆکا	Barzan
	ئاسته‌	Barzan
	سرێشمه‌	Barzan
	سه‌فتی	Barzan
	ئیسومه‌را	Barzan
	زوره‌ گڤان	Barzan
	شرێ	Barzan
	ده‌ربۆتک	Barzan
	ئالکا	Barzan
	ساکا	Barzan
	ملانێ	Barzan
	بێکریس	Barzan
	هه‌ربو	Barzan
	گه‌راڤێ	Barzan
	ماسه‌کا	Barzan
	بێکروب	Barzan
	سیدان	Barzan
	ئه‌رده‌ویل	Barzan
Pîran	پیران	Pîran
	مامسکی	Pîran
	واژێ	Pîran
	بێدود	Pîran
	سه‌روکانی	Pîran
	مه‌ران	Pîran
	مه‌سه‌ن	Pîran
	بابکێ	Pîran
	که‌لۆک	Pîran
	مه‌مولان	Pîran
	هه‌لون	Pîran
	خێره‌ زۆک	Pîran
	هه‌ژیر	Pîran
	پیر سیاو	Pîran
	کژله‌کا	Pîran
	زه‌رگه‌ته‌	Pîran
	دایلا	Pîran
	گرد کاڵ	Pîran
	بنده‌ر	Pîran
	که‌کلێ	Pîran
	کانی مه‌ران	Pîran
	زه‌ندا	Pîran
	شاپان	Pîran
	شیوه‌که‌ور	Pîran
	گۆره‌بۆزا	Pîran
	کۆلیتا	Pîran
Şêrwan Mezin	شێروان مه‌زن	Şêrwan Mezin
	به‌رده‌سور	Şêrwan Mezin
	كانى مارۆك	Şêrwan Mezin
	شێروان مه‌زن	Şêrwan Mezin
	چه‌مێ	Şêrwan Mezin
	بێخشاش	Şêrwan Mezin
	كانى بۆت	Şêrwan Mezin
	لێڕ	Şêrwan Mezin
	بێ چه‌نى	Şêrwan Mezin
	زێت	Şêrwan Mezin
	ئێدلب	Şêrwan Mezin
	سپيندار	Şêrwan Mezin
Pendro	پێندرۆ	Şêrwan Mezin
	دێزوو	Şêrwan Mezin
	سێلكێ	Şêrwan Mezin
	ناڤكوركا	Şêrwan Mezin
	هوپه‌	Şêrwan Mezin
	تاتكێ	Şêrwan Mezin
	هه‌لانيا	Şêrwan Mezin
	بێديال	Şêrwan Mezin
	مۆكا	Şêrwan Mezin
	پاڵانه‌	Şêrwan Mezin
	كوران	Şêrwan Mezin
	بوسێ	Şêrwan Mezin
	سينا	Şêrwan Mezin
	(گيزێ (ئاسته‌نگ	Şêrwan Mezin
	مێروز	Şêrwan Mezin
	به‌ركه‌لێ	Şêrwan Mezin
	ڕه‌ڤين	Şêrwan Mezin
	سومێ	Şêrwan Mezin
	سلور	Şêrwan Mezin
	شيڤێ	Şêrwan Mezin
	هه‌لاره‌	Şêrwan Mezin
	بژيان	Şêrwan Mezin
	توێ	Şêrwan Mezin
	به‌نان	Şêrwan Mezin
	ئه‌رگوش	Şêrwan Mezin
	ماوه‌تا	Şêrwan Mezin
	ئاكيكا	Şêrwan Mezin
	گه‌ڵانه‌	Şêrwan Mezin
	تيادێرى	Şêrwan Mezin
	ئه‌رده‌ويل	Şêrwan Mezin
	درێ	Şêrwan Mezin
	هه‌ركى	Şêrwan Mezin
	بێداو	Şêrwan Mezin
	كێ سه‌روو	Şêrwan Mezin
	كه‌ونه‌زێت	Şêrwan Mezin
	پاورا	Şêrwan Mezin
	تۆلاخ	Şêrwan Mezin
Meznê	مه‌زنێ	Meznê
	كونه‌ مار	Meznê
	كه‌ونه‌گوند	Meznê
	دێرانه‌	Meznê
	فه‌قيان	Meznê
	ئيسقيل	Meznê
	خوشكه‌‌ڵ	Meznê
	شێروكيان	Meznê
	ئه‌شكه‌وتوان	Meznê
	شێتنه‌	Meznê
Goretû	گۆره‌توو	Goretû
	شێخان	Goretû
	ببێل	Goretû
	زينێ	Goretû
	خه‌ڵان	Goretû
	بۆكران	Goretû
	ڵه‌يلوك	Goretû
	ناوميرَگان	Goretû
	خه‌ردن	Goretû
	خۆشكان	Goretû
	جوسكێ	Goretû
	باوه‌	Goretû
	شێخ سه‌يدا	Goretû
	فه‌قيان	Goretû
	شانه‌ده‌ر	Goretû
	ژاژوك	Goretû
	كۆركێ	Goretû
	ئيش وكور	Goretû
	كوڕان	Goretû
	بانه‌	Goretû
	شیڤه‌ دز	Goretû
	كانيه‌ لنج	Goretû
	زرارا	Goretû
	بێدارون	Goretû
	دۆرێ	Goretû
	كانيه‌ دێر	Goretû
	رێزان	Goretû
	پيره‌ سال	Goretû
	ئه‌شكه‌وتێ	Goretû
	سۆران سه‌روو	Goretû
	له‌شكريان	Goretû

=== Mexmur District ===
Mexmur District consists of the five sub-districts of Mexmûr, Gwêr, Kendênawe, Qerac and Melaqere. Mexmûr is the capital of the district.

Name	Official name	Sub-district
Mexmûr	مه‌خمور	Mexmûr
	دوگردكان حاجى حوسێن	Mexmûr
	كه‌ربه‌شه‌ سابر	Mexmûr
	كه‌ره‌سور	Mexmûr
	قه‌‌ڵاته‌ سۆران	Mexmûr
	كه‌ربه‌شه‌ ره‌حمان	Mexmûr
	‌پا‌ڵانى	Mexmûr
	قه‌سران	Mexmûr
	(عين ئه‌يوب (‌پيرداوود سوان	Mexmûr
	عه‌لياوه‌	Mexmûr
	جه‌ديده‌	Mexmûr
	دوگردكان حاجى موسته‌فا	Mexmûr
	عومه‌راوه‌	Mexmûr
	سيرمه‌	Mexmûr
	كه‌‌پرۆك	Mexmûr
	گبيه‌	Mexmûr
	خه‌رابه‌ جارالله	Mexmûr
	گرون الحمر	Mexmûr
	كوديله‌	Mexmûr
	مهانه‌	Mexmûr
	خالديه‌	Mexmûr
	عين مرميه‌	Mexmûr
	سلاحيه‌	Mexmûr
	سيداوه‌	Mexmûr
	عين موزان	Mexmûr
	عين ابو هدلان	Mexmûr
	تل الريم	Mexmûr
	وادى الغراب	Mexmûr
	بشار (مشار)	Mexmûr
	هوارغل	Mexmûr
	كێله‌شين	Mexmûr
	كه‌م‌پي ئاواره‌كان	Mexmûr
Gwêr	گوێر	Gwêr
	قادريه‌	Gwêr
	‌ژهيبه‌	Gwêr
	شمامل	Gwêr
	قه‌لاته‌ سۆران	Gwêr
	ترجان	Gwêr
	على ملاداود	Gwêr
	سيد امين	Gwêr
	مگراد صارلو	Gwêr
	مگراد شرابي	Gwêr
	ميل سيد محمد	Gwêr
	ميل سيد عبدالكريم	Gwêr
Kendênawe	كه‌ندێناوه‌	Kendênawe
	‌پيره‌بات	Kendênawe
	تێكا‌ڵو	Kendênawe
	‌چه‌‌ڵتوك	Kendênawe
	عبدالله گوجيلان	Kendênawe
	دارخورما	Kendênawe
	حه‌سه‌ن بلباس	Kendênawe
	حاجي شێخان	Kendênawe
	‌چه‌غه‌ميره‌	Kendênawe
	كه‌ندا‌ڵ قه‌ل	Kendênawe
	جانه‌	Kendênawe
	صوفي سمايل	Kendênawe
	دێمه‌كار	Kendênawe
	‌چيغلوك	Kendênawe
	لاوه‌ر	Kendênawe
	خدر جيجه‌	Kendênawe
	گاوه‌ره‌	Kendênawe
Qerac	قه‌راج	Qerac
	سه‌لماس	Qerac
	خه‌رانه‌	Qerac
	كونه‌ سيخوره‌	Qerac
	گرد قۆشنه‌	Qerac
	گوگته‌‌په‌	Qerac
	محمل ئۆمه‌ران	Qerac
	ئازي كه‌ند	Qerac
	گۆمه‌ شين	Qerac
	گه‌زۆك	Qerac
	محسن ئاوه‌	Qerac
	گردى گۆم	Qerac
	شوره‌ ‌په‌لكه‌	Qerac
	قه‌‌ڵاته‌ سۆران مه‌رزان	Qerac
	دوسه‌ره‌ بالا	Qerac
	خربه‌ردان	Qerac
	كه‌رمردى	Qerac
	سێگردكان	Qerac
	گولگامش	Qerac
	قو‌چ س‌پيلكه‌	Qerac
	خرابه‌ جبر	Qerac
	قديله‌	Qerac
	عينكاوه‌	Qerac
	حوشترالوك	Qerac
	حه‌سارۆك	Qerac
	قۆ‌چ	Qerac
	گرد‌پان	Qerac
	رواله‌	Qerac
	لاك‌چه‌	Qerac
	گرده‌ ‌چا‌ڵ	Qerac
	گرده‌ بۆر	Qerac
	گرد گراوى	Qerac
	على ره‌ش	Qerac
	‌پونجينه‌	Qerac
	‌چارگۆمان	Qerac
	كلشخان	Qerac
	برايم باول	Qerac
	لاسور	Qerac
	دوسه‌ره‌ ‌ژێري	Qerac
	جوكش	Qerac
	دينكاوه‌	Qerac
	گرد گليخه‌	Qerac
	خندق صغير	Qerac
	باشبه‌ند	Qerac
	شياله‌	Qerac
	قبر سيد	Qerac
	شندر تحتانى	Qerac
	گرده‌ڕه‌ش	Qerac
	شندر فوقانى	Qerac
	خرابه‌ زه‌رد	Qerac
	سرناج صغير	Qerac
	سرناج كبير	Qerac
	عدله‌	Qerac
	عزيز عبده‌	Qerac
	حديقه‌ مارواش	Qerac
	گرده‌دێوانه‌	Qerac
	گرده‌هاره‌	Qerac
	عاره‌بۆك	Qerac
	خندق كبير	Qerac
	ته‌ل غه‌زال	Qerac
	گرده‌ دۆم ادريس	Qerac
	شناوه‌	Qerac
	حرفوشيه‌/ خربه‌ خلف	Qerac
	خربه‌منديان	Qerac
	اكرح فوقانى	Qerac
	خربه‌ جواله‌	Qerac
	تل متر	Qerac
	گرد قۆشه‌نه‌	Qerac
	دوورنكيو	Qerac
	سرتاج كبير	Qerac
Melaqere	مه‌لاقه‌ره‌	Melaqere
	كه‌ندا‌ڵ يارم‌چه‌	Melaqere
	گرده‌ شينه‌	Melaqere
	دووشيوان	Melaqere
	كۆزه‌ ‌پانكه‌	Melaqere
	خه‌زنه‌	Melaqere
	گردى گۆم	Melaqere
	ملك ئاغا	Melaqere
	مه‌لاقه‌ره‌	Melaqere
	‌پيره‌ به‌رازه‌	Melaqere
	ناسر كو‌ژراو	Melaqere
	كورتان دروو	Melaqere
	ميلهورت محمد سعيد	Melaqere
	ميلهورت قه‌ره‌ني	Melaqere
	شێخه‌ لاس	Melaqere
	‌چل هه‌وێزه‌	Melaqere
	خورمه‌‌ڵه‌	Melaqere
	شورجه‌	Melaqere
	سه‌يدۆكه‌	Melaqere
	حه‌سارۆك	Melaqere
	سيد عبيد	Melaqere
	به‌رزه‌وار	Melaqere
	سمايلاوه‌ى ‌ژوروو	Melaqere
	سمايلاوه‌ى نوێ	Melaqere
	شۆره‌ زه‌رتكه‌	Melaqere

=== Rawandiz District ===
Rawandiz District consists of the two sub-districts of Rawandiz and Wertê. Rawandiz is the capital of the district.

Name	Official name	Sub-district
Rawandiz	ڕەواندز	Rawandiz
Akokewn	ئاکۆکه‌ون	Rawandiz
Zewê	زێوه‌	Rawandiz
Kerek	که‌ره‌ک	Rawandiz
	جندیان بێشوک	Rawandiz
Gerewanî xwarû	گه‌ره‌وانی خواروو	Rawandiz
Seran	سه‌ران	Rawandiz
Binekawl	بنه‌کاول	Rawandiz
Bersîrîn	به‌رسرین	Rawandiz
Bênuriyan	بێنوریان	Rawandiz
Pîrswan	پیرسوان	Rawandiz
Cnêrawe	جنيراوه‌	Rawandiz
Mîraciya	میراجیان	Rawandiz
Binmêrd	بنمێرده‌	Rawandiz
Mawîliyan	ماویلیان	Rawandiz
Bêxall	بێخال	Rawandiz
Gerewanî serû	گه‌ره‌وانی سه‌روو	Rawandiz
Akoyan	ئاکۆیان	Rawandiz
Feqiyan	فه‌قیان	Rawandiz
Zerwa	زه‌روا	Rawandiz
Sêwek	ساو سێوک	Rawandiz
Wertê	وه‌رتێ	Wertê
Rêzanok	ڕێزانۆک	Wertê
Dergelle	ده‌رگه‌ڵه‌‌	Wertê
Rejukeryan	ڕه‌ژوکه‌ریان	Wertê
Çom Rîxîn	چۆمه‌رخین	Wertê
Serinews	سه‌رنه‌وس	Wertê
Xaneqa	خانه‌قائه‌	Wertê
Bersul	به‌رسول	Wertê
Gocar	گۆجار	Wertê
Çinêran	چنێران	Wertê
Kelêtê	کلێته‌	Wertê
	مه‌کی وه‌رتی	Wertê

=== Şeqlawe District ===
Şeqlawe District consists of the six sub-districts of Şeqlawe, Selahedîn, Herîr, Hîran, Basirme and Balîsan. Şeqlawe is the capital of the district.

Name	Official name	Sub-district
Şeqlawe	شه‌قڵاوه‌	Şeqlawe
Selahedîn	سه‌لاحه‌دين	Selahedîn
	شێخان	Selahedîn
	به‌ربيان	Selahedîn
	حجران	Selahedîn
	دێرێ - سه‌روكانى	Selahedîn
	ئه‌لماوان	Selahedîn
	زه‌رگوز	Selahedîn
	دره‌ش	Selahedîn
	په‌رپيتان	Selahedîn
	ده‌ربه‌ند سه‌يد	Selahedîn
	بيرێژ	Selahedîn
	بيرێژ	Selahedîn
	گه‌لياوه‌	Selahedîn
	بانه‌مان	Selahedîn
	گرده‌ چاڵ	Selahedîn
	زێبارۆك	Selahedîn
	قيرژه‌	Selahedîn
	زياره‌ت كۆڕێ	Selahedîn
	شيخ مه‌موديان	Selahedîn
	سێوه‌كه‌	Selahedîn
	دونگزاوه‌	Selahedîn
	سولێ	Selahedîn
	ترپه‌ زه‌رد	Selahedîn
	ته‌وسكه‌	Selahedîn
	دوين	Selahedîn
	قه‌لاسنجى سه‌روو	Selahedîn
	عالاوه‌	Selahedîn
	توبزاوه‌	Selahedîn
	سارتكه‌	Selahedîn
	ده‌ربه‌ندى گومه‌سپان	Selahedîn
	گۆمه‌سپان	Selahedîn
	بناو	Selahedîn
	هه‌ناره‌	Selahedîn
	گراو	Selahedîn
	قه‌لاسنجى خواروو	Selahedîn
	خوران	Selahedîn
Herîr	هه‌رير	Herîr
	باسكه‌ كاريته‌	Herîr
	قه‌ڵاته‌جن	Herîr
	دڕه‌مير	Herîr
	تاله‌جار	Herîr
	سه‌ركه‌ند كه‌لو	Herîr
	سوكه‌	Herîr
	چه‌مه‌كه‌ى خواروو	Herîr
	چه‌مه‌كه‌ى سه‌روو	Herîr
	گۆسكه‌	Herîr
	يه‌ك ده‌ر	Herîr
	زه‌رگوز	Herîr
	مه‌كردان	Herîr
	كه‌له‌كين كه‌لو	Herîr
	فه‌قێيان	Herîr
	پيره‌وه‌رمان	Herîr
	هه‌ڕه‌ش	Herîr
	خڕه‌	Herîr
	قڕبه‌گ	Herîr
	قه‌نديل	Herîr
	به‌ربيان	Herîr
	ناوشيوان	Herîr
	به‌ردين	Herîr
	كانى چرگان	Herîr
	ئه‌شكه‌فته‌	Herîr
	ئامۆكان	Herîr
	فلون	Herîr
	ئافريان	Herîr
	گوله‌ك	Herîr
	ده‌ربه‌ندۆك	Herîr
	هه‌ناره‌	Herîr
	خرواتان	Herîr
Hîran	هيران	Hîran
	تركاله‌	Hîran
	به‌ركه‌	Hîran
	سپيگره‌	Hîran
	چنێران	Hîran
	ئاقوبانى خواروو	Hîran
	ئاقوباني سه‌روو	Hîran
	كه‌وه‌رتيان	Hîran
	پونگينه‌	Hîran
	ئه‌سپينداره‌	Hîran
	فريز	Hîran
	گه‌رۆته‌	Hîran
	مه‌ندێر	Hîran
	بيرۆكان	Hîran
	ناودارۆكان	Hîran
	سولاوك	Hîran
	زياره‌ت	Hîran
	لاسه‌	Hîran
Basirme	باسرمه‌	Basirme
	ره‌زگه‌ خۆشناو	Basirme
	سورسوره‌	Basirme
	موتراوه‌	Basirme
	ئالي سيدك	Basirme
	سيساوه‌	Basirme
	باشورى سه‌روو	Basirme
	شيناوه‌	Basirme
	شارسينان	Basirme
	باسرمه‌ى كۆن	Basirme
	قه‌سرۆك	Basirme
	قاديانه‌	Basirme
	كه‌ور گۆسك	Basirme
	ميراوه‌	Basirme
	مامه‌ جه‌لكه‌	Basirme
	شێخ مه‌موديان	Basirme
	مير ڕۆسته‌م	Basirme
	گه‌ره‌وانى خواروو	Basirme
	گه‌ره‌وانى سه‌روو	Basirme
	بيروه‌رمان	Basirme
	قوبه‌	Basirme
	كوبۆر	Basirme
	قاسميه‌	Basirme
	كوێكان	Basirme
	كانى تاوك	Basirme
	ئارمه‌ندان	Basirme
	به‌رازان	Basirme
	چه‌مه‌ سۆر	Basirme
	كه‌له‌كين خه‌يلانى	Basirme
	ره‌شان	Basirme
	بابه‌ جيسك	Basirme
	ره‌زگه‌ دێوين	Basirme
	سه‌ركه‌ند خه‌يلانى	Basirme
	خه‌تيبيان	Basirme
	ماوه‌ران	Basirme
	كۆنه‌ ماوه‌ران	Basirme
	ماوه‌ران	Basirme
	مه‌رزان	Basirme
	باشورى خواروو	Basirme
	به‌رده‌ گه‌وره‌	Basirme
	مه‌مدي	Basirme
	باويان	Basirme
Balîsan	باليسان	Balîsan
	خه‌تێ	Balîsan
	توتمه‌	Balîsan
	بێرۆ	Balîsan
	شێخ وه‌سان	Balîsan
	بێراوه‌	Balîsan
	شيرێ	Balîsan

=== Soran District ===
Soran District consists of the four sub-districts of Soran, Xelîfan, Diana and Sîdekan. Soran is the capital of the district.

Name	Official name	Sub-district
Soran	سۆران	Soran
	خه‌بات	Soran
	زانياري	Soran
	هندرێن	Soran
	بارزان	Soran
	هه‌رێم	Soran
	گۆره‌ز	Soran
	جونديان	Soran
	شۆڕش	Soran
	ديڵمان	Soran
	قه‌نديڵ	Soran
	راپه‌ڕين	Soran
	ئيسقه‌له‌	Soran
	وه‌ستا ره‌جه‌ب	Soran
	چه‌مى رێزان	Soran
Xelîfan	خه‌ليفان	Xelîfan
	سرێشمه‌	Xelîfan
	كانى وه‌تمان	Xelîfan
	ده‌شتى لوك	Xelîfan
	گه‌لى عه‌لي به‌گ	Xelîfan
	ليره‌ مير	Xelîfan
	خه‌لان بياو	Xelîfan
	كنه‌ك	Xelîfan
	جۆنه‌له‌	Xelîfan
	هه‌ناره‌	Xelîfan
	جافره‌كان	Xelîfan
	پيره‌ خه‌ليل	Xelîfan
	بله‌ى خواروو	Xelîfan
	بله‌ى سه‌روو	Xelîfan
	مالمن	Xelîfan
	هه‌ورى	Xelîfan
	په‌ركين	Xelîfan
	جۆله‌ مێرگ	Xelîfan
	كه‌له‌كين	Xelîfan
	به‌نۆكه‌	Xelîfan
	كانيه‌ره‌ش	Xelîfan
	ئاڵانه‌	Xelîfan
	كانى كولك	Xelîfan
	سێناوه‌	Xelîfan
	قومريان	Xelîfan
	گۆره‌ز	Xelîfan
	ساوه‌	Xelîfan
	كۆنه‌ سيخور	Xelîfan
	ماندان	Xelîfan
	بناو	Xelîfan
	دوله‌ تيسو	Xelîfan
	ره‌شه‌ گۆم	Xelîfan
	زه‌رده‌ گۆم	Xelîfan
	شارسينا	Xelîfan
	هه‌روته‌ كۆن	Xelîfan
	قه‌سروك	Xelîfan
	به‌وركان	Xelîfan
	كوڕه‌ك	Xelîfan
Diana	ديانا	Diana
	ناوكۆك	Diana
	كه‌ورين	Diana
	باله‌كيان	Diana
	باله‌كيان	Diana
	شاوراوه‌	Diana
	هاوديان	Diana
	شێخان	Diana
	سيتكان	Diana
	هه‌سنان	Diana
	ناورۆين	Diana
Sîdekan	سيده‌كان	Sîdekan
	په‌نجار	Sîdekan
	كه‌ژه‌ك	Sîdekan
	كاني چنارۆك	Sîdekan
	سۆريا	Sîdekan
	شيوان	Sîdekan
	هه‌وێلان	Sîdekan
	سيده‌كان	Sîdekan
	كه‌ونه‌ سيده‌كان	Sîdekan
	تۆپزاوه‌	Sîdekan
	ژيليا	Sîdekan
	كانيه‌ باز	Sîdekan
	بێرته‌	Sîdekan
	بۆڵێ	Sîdekan
	ژوژيله‌	Sîdekan
	هێرده‌ن	Sîdekan
	بێواس	Sîdekan
	ماوه‌ تاوه‌	Sîdekan
	بێ سێو	Sîdekan
	به‌نێ	Sîdekan
	بره‌شكين	Sîdekan
	به‌ربزين	Sîdekan
	پنگوسته‌	Sîdekan
	باسه‌كاني سه‌روو	Sîdekan
	يورا	Sîdekan
	ميشان	Sîdekan
	جيليا	Sîdekan
	ده‌لاوه‌	Sîdekan
	داسني	Sîdekan
	زين	Sîdekan
	بێجوانه‌	Sîdekan
	باويا	Sîdekan
	بوزان	Sîdekan
	جه‌را	Sîdekan
	هه‌تكا	Sîdekan
	دۆره‌ ملك	Sîdekan
	كه‌نگرينه‌	Sîdekan
	كۆخا زيزا	Sîdekan
	ميناى خواروو	Sîdekan
	نزارى	Sîdekan
	ماوه‌رد	Sîdekan
	به‌نان	Sîdekan
	سه‌روو	Sîdekan
	دراو ژۆرى	Sîdekan
	كانى مه‌لا	Sîdekan
	وسوانه‌	Sîdekan
	ئاليستا	Sîdekan
	دێما	Sîdekan
	خليفان	Sîdekan
	ليلكان	Sîdekan
	بلسنان	Sîdekan
	بيركمه‌	Sîdekan
	هارونه‌	Sîdekan
	سيباره‌	Sîdekan
	چناره‌	Sîdekan
	كۆلا	Sîdekan
	زياره‌ت	Sîdekan
	سپينداره‌	Sîdekan
	سپيلكه‌	Sîdekan
	ئارموش	Sîdekan
	مه‌رگه‌وه‌ر	Sîdekan
	موسلوك	Sîdekan
	شه‌وشانه‌	Sîdekan
	لۆلان	Sîdekan
	دۆلا	Sîdekan
	كوره‌	Sîdekan
	سورته‌	Sîdekan
	يالكه‌	Sîdekan
	بيركاته‌	Sîdekan
	رووسوور	Sîdekan
	بێبات	Sîdekan
	خريته‌	Sîdekan
	يالانه‌	Sîdekan
	بێسوك	Sîdekan
	مه‌لابادين	Sîdekan
	كۆلا	Sîdekan
	كانيه‌ ڕه‌ش	Sîdekan
	سويكه‌ بزرانه‌	Sîdekan
	هۆلێ	Sîdekan
	به‌رپيتان	Sîdekan
	كلاولا	Sîdekan
	بێكۆلك	Sîdekan
	سيره‌وه‌	Sîdekan
	هه‌دنێ سفلى	Sîdekan
	هه‌دنێ عليا	Sîdekan
	ئارى عليا	Sîdekan
	كوكليا	Sîdekan
	ئارى سفلى	Sîdekan
	خه‌زنه‌	Sîdekan
	گلان گه‌ردى	Sîdekan
	دورچه‌	Sîdekan
	فه‌قێ وه‌سه‌لمان	Sîdekan
	كوره‌بي	Sîdekan
	بيوكمه‌	Sîdekan
	خه‌زنێ و به‌ربانيان	Sîdekan
	هه‌رين	Sîdekan
	ئاڵانه‌	Sîdekan
	بيكزن	Sîdekan
	بلس	Sîdekan
	باراوه‌	Sîdekan
	ناوداران	Sîdekan
	بيوك	Sîdekan
	كورسيو	Sîdekan
	كيزه‌قولا	Sîdekan
	شيوه‌ گوار	Sîdekan
	بێشكه‌	Sîdekan
	ساومان	Sîdekan
	كوڕمامك	Sîdekan
	مه‌غاره‌	Sîdekan
	تاوك	Sîdekan
	نۆكه‌له‌	Sîdekan
	باغێ	Sîdekan
	بێقه‌پوشك	Sîdekan
	پيره‌برايم	Sîdekan
	ڕوين	Sîdekan
	شيوه‌ سه‌قه‌ر	Sîdekan
	سووره‌ زه‌وى	Sîdekan
	كۆچ حسن	Sîdekan
	يێره‌ بير	Sîdekan
	ناوشيۆك	Sîdekan
	ناوروان	Sîdekan
	خشوله‌	Sîdekan
	شايك	Sîdekan
	بێكۆر	Sîdekan
	نيه‌	Sîdekan
	ئالۆكان	Sîdekan
	تالستا	Sîdekan
	خوار	Sîdekan
	سنين	Sîdekan
	چاوكه‌	Sîdekan
	گوره‌سێو	Sîdekan
	مێرگه‌ دوكان	Sîdekan
	مێرگه‌مير	Sîdekan
	ئاستو	Sîdekan
	ئالموسي خواروو	Sîdekan
	ئالموسي سه‌روو	Sîdekan
	ئارێ	Sîdekan
	ئاوبرا	Sîdekan
	ئه‌لاوان	Sîdekan
	باجاره‌	Sîdekan
	باڵه‌كه‌	Sîdekan
	به‌رده‌بۆز	Sîdekan
	به‌رده‌سۆر	Sîdekan
	بله‌سا	Sîdekan
	بنكه‌ور	Sîdekan
	بڕه‌ پيره‌	Sîdekan
	بێ كۆڵ	Sîdekan
	بێسينه‌	Sîdekan
	تياره‌	Sîdekan
	تێراون	Sîdekan
	پاروو	Sîdekan
	پێخمه‌	Sîdekan
	پيربه‌ينان	Sîdekan
	حه‌يات	Sîdekan
	خه‌تره‌	Sîdekan
	ده‌رريات	Sîdekan
	ده‌عله‌كوش	Sîdekan
	ده‌يار لۆك	Sîdekan
	ديريسكا	Sîdekan
	زه‌روا	Sîdekan
	زراوۆك	Sîdekan
	جورجا	Sîdekan
	چونسا	Sîdekan
	زيلۆين	Sîdekan
	سۆسناى خواروو	Sîdekan
	سۆسناى سه‌روو	Sîdekan
	سۆى باپير	Sîdekan
	سالاريا	Sîdekan
	ستيكا	Sîdekan
	سماقه‌	Sîdekan
	سيرۆك	Sîdekan
	شابكێ	Sîdekan
	شه‌مه‌رما	Sîdekan
	شناو	Sîdekan
	شيوه‌ن	Sîdekan
	جۆرت	Sîdekan
	چه‌مه‌ولا	Sîdekan
	گۆڕه‌ به‌سێ	Sîdekan
	گۆڕه‌ ديم	Sîdekan
	گۆڕه‌ بيێ	Sîdekan
	كۆران	Sîdekan
	كۆزينه‌	Sîdekan
	كه‌رزاوه‌	Sîdekan
	كه‌مه‌ك	Sîdekan
	كه‌وه‌ر	Sîdekan
	چويركه‌	Sîdekan
	كێله‌گا	Sîdekan
	ماونانێ	Sîdekan
	هێشمه‌	Sîdekan
	رزگه‌ته‌	Sîdekan

=== Xebat District ===
Xebat District consists of the four sub-districts of Xebat, Dare Şekran, Rizgarî and Kewrgosk. Xebat is the capital of the district.

Name	Official name	Sub-district
Xebat	خه‌بات	Xebat
	مه‌لا عومه‌ر	Xebat
	چه‌مه‌ دبس	Xebat
Dare Şekran	داره‌شه‌كران	Dare Şekran
	شيوه‌له‌ك	Dare Şekran
	قه‌په‌كيان	Dare Şekran
	زه‌رواو	Dare Şekran
	ره‌شوان نورۆ	Dare Şekran
	گردى ماوان	Dare Şekran
	مام خالان	Dare Şekran
	ره‌شوان يوسف	Dare Şekran
	خاڵوان	Dare Şekran
	گردى مامك	Dare Şekran
	گۆپاڵ	Dare Şekran
	وسومه‌ليانى	Dare Şekran
	گه‌روو ده‌لالان	Dare Şekran
	مه‌نداوه‌	Dare Şekran
	چه‌مه‌ به‌گه‌ز	Dare Şekran
	چره‌	Dare Şekran
	هه‌بابان	Dare Şekran
	كوده‌ريان	Dare Şekran
	زه‌رگه‌زه‌ى	Dare Şekran
	باوه‌ خه‌ڵان	Dare Şekran
	كاوانيان	Dare Şekran
	ترپه‌زه‌رد	Dare Şekran
	كه‌وره‌سور	Dare Şekran
Rizgarî	رزگارى	Rizgarî
	سێبيرانى گه‌وره‌	Rizgarî
	قه‌ريتاغ	Rizgarî
	كانى قرژاڵه‌	Rizgarî
	جديده‌ زاب	Rizgarî
	كۆمه‌ڵگه‌ى جديده‌ زاب	Rizgarî
	ساتۆر	Rizgarî
	چالوكى گه‌وره‌	Rizgarî
	چالوكى بچوك	Rizgarî
	تۆبزاوه‌	Rizgarî
	گرده‌ره‌شه‌ زاب	Rizgarî
	كه‌و ره‌به‌ن	Rizgarî
Kewrgosk	كه‌ورگۆسك	Kewrgosk
	خرابه‌ دراو	Kewrgosk
	گاينج	Kewrgosk
	ئاغولان	Kewrgosk
	گرده‌شێر	Kewrgosk
	شيوه‌ڕه‌ش	Kewrgosk
	ئيفراز كه‌مال	Kewrgosk

== Halabja Governorate ==
Halabja Governorate consists of the four districts of Biyare, Halabja, Sirwan and Xurmal. Halabja is the capital of the governorate.

=== Biyare District ===
Name	Official name
Biyare	بياره‌
	خار گيلان
	سه‌رگه‌ت
	گوڵپ
	خه‌رپانى
	تاويره‌
	ده‌ره‌ى مه‌ڕ
	باخه‌ كۆن
	گه‌رجێنه‌ى باخه‌ كۆن
	هانه‌ى دن
	به‌ڵخه‌
	هاوار
	گريانه‌
	ده‌ره‌تفى
	پاڵانيان
	سۆسه‌كان
	نارنجه‌ڵه‌
	بنجوى دڕه‌
	ده‌رگاى شێخان
	هانه‌ نه‌وتى
	ده‌ره‌ قه‌يسه‌ر

=== Helebce District ===
Name	Official name
Helebce	ھەڵەبجە

=== Sirwan District ===
Name	Official name
Sîrwan	سيروان
	زه‌مه‌قى
	حسن ئاوا
	عه‌نه‌ب
	بیاوێڵه‌
	به‌شاره‌ت
	قشڵاغه‌ ڕووته‌
	پريسى خواروو
	ده‌لێنى خواروو
	قورتاس
	ته‌په‌گوڵاوى
	شێخ موسا
	جۆلك
	دوانزه‌ ئيمام
	جاڵكه‌ى عاشور
	بێژاوا
	پريسى ژوروو
	جه‌ليله‌
	تريفه‌
	باوه‌كۆچه‌ك
	عه‌بابه‌يلێ
	غوڵامی
	گونده‌ و سه‌راو
	سازان
	هانه‌سوره‌
	قاره‌مانى
	بى له‌نكه‌
	ميراولى
	نێرگزه‌ جار
	جروستانه‌
	به‌شى پيرك
	مامه‌ شه‌يى
	كۆساوا
	گرده‌ ناوێ
	چنار
	نه‌يجه‌ڵه‌
	ڕێشاو
	مۆردين
	بۆين
	لمه‌
	پێگه‌

=== Xurmal District ===
Name	Official name
Xurmal	خورماڵ
	كشه‌ده‌رى و ته‌په‌ رێزينه‌
	ولوسينان
	شيره‌مه‌ڕ
	عامووره‌
	ميرى سور
	ڕيشێن
	شه‌شك و شابلاخ
	ته‌ويله‌جۆ
	سه‌رگه‌ته‌ جۆ
	نه‌وێ
	زيرون
	گه‌رچێنه‌ى بانى بنۆك
	بانى شار
	ياڵانپێ
	احمد اوا
	ده‌لين
	ده‌لين
	به‌رده‌به‌ل
	زه‌ڵم
	بانى بنۆك
	ده‌ره‌ شيش
	ته‌په‌كوڕه‌

== Sulaymaniyah Governorate ==
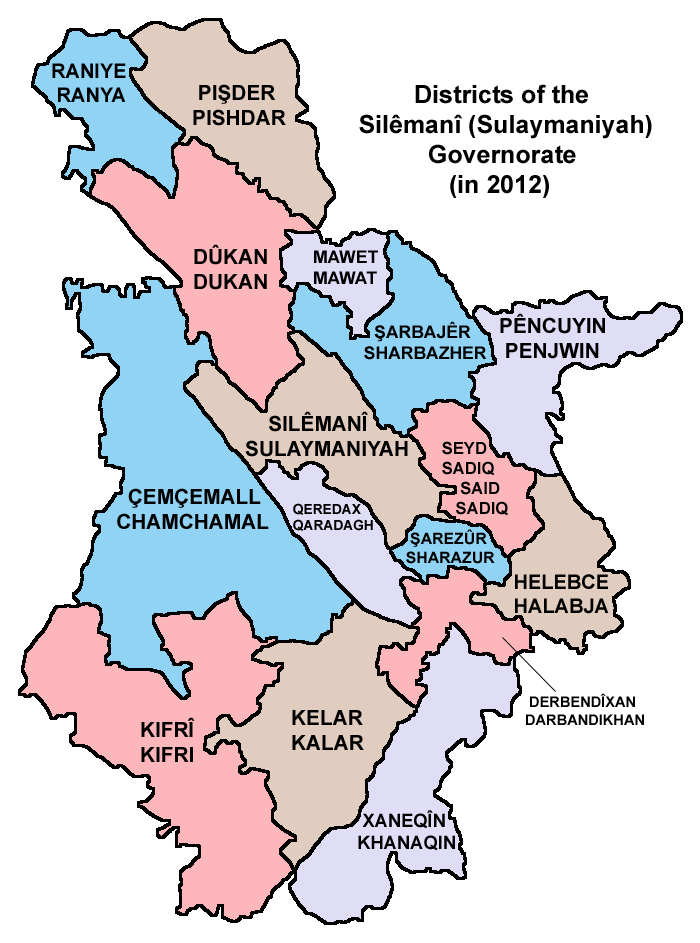
Sulaymaniyah Governorate in 2012, before the creation of Halabja Governorate.

=== Çemçemal District ===
Çemçemal District consists of the seven sub-districts of Çemçemal, Şoris, Sengaw, Tekiye, Axceler, Qadirkerem, and Tekyeyî Cebarî. Çemçemal is the capital of the district.

Name	Official name	Sub-district
Çemçemal	چەمچەماڵ	Çemçemal
	بنگرد	Çemçemal
	ئيبراهيم ئاغا	Çemçemal
	هەمزە	Çemçemal
	گورگەيى كاك عەبدوڵا	Çemçemal
	گورگەيى كاك عەبدوڵا	Çemçemal
	گورگەيى چاوسور	Çemçemal
	گورگەيى شامار	Çemçemal
	گورگەيى فەتاح	Çemçemal
	باينجانى سەروو	Çemçemal
	باينجانى خواروو	Çemçemal
	كانى كەوە	Çemçemal
	ئەحمەد لەوەند	Çemçemal
	عەلى زەنگەنە	Çemçemal
	سۆفى حەسەن	Çemçemal
	ژاڵەى دەربەند	Çemçemal
	قولە	Çemçemal
	مەلاحسێن	Çemçemal
	باسەرە	Çemçemal
	مەحموديە	Çemçemal
	كونە كۆتر	Çemçemal
	زەنان	Çemçemal
	هەكزى سەروو	Çemçemal
	هەكزى خواروو	Çemçemal
	چاڵاو	Çemçemal
	دانە سوفى	Çemçemal
Şoris	شۆڕش	Şoris
	قودرەتە	Şoris
	(پيريادي (چۆڵ	Şoris
	موزەفەر	Şoris
	عوسمان غەزال	Şoris
	فەيزاوا	Şoris
	فەيزاواى سەرچەم	Şoris
	گۆشت قووت	Şoris
	(چەشمە بەردين (چۆڵ	Şoris
	عەلى مەنسور	Şoris
	چراخە ڕووتە	Şoris
	قەڵاچۆغەى سەروو	Şoris
	قەڵاچۆغەى خواروو	Şoris
	قاسم بەگ زادە	Şoris
	قرخ	Şoris
	كوڕەداوى	Şoris
	قەرەتاموور	Şoris
	سەعدون ئاوا	Şoris
	نورەى سەروو	Şoris
	نورەى خواروو	Şoris
	(گۆڕبنە (چۆڵ	Şoris
	دارەتوو	Şoris
	تاڵەبان	Şoris
	جافان	Şoris
	سەوزگە	Şoris
	تەپەدێي سەروو	Şoris
	تەپەدێي خواروو	Şoris
	(تەپەدێي دارە قازي (كۆن	Şoris
Sengaw	سەنگاو	Sengaw
	گەڕاوى حاجى شەريف	Sengaw
	گەڕاو	Sengaw
	خوێڵينى ئاوەلێڵەكە	Sengaw
	خوێڵينى قەڵاى باسەرە	Sengaw
	مەملەحەى خوێڵين	Sengaw
	خوێڵينى كەوەڵە	Sengaw
	مەملەحەى خوێڵينى گوم	Sengaw
	ئاوەبۆرەكەى سەروو	Sengaw
	ئاوەبۆرەكەى خواروو	Sengaw
	ژاڵەى گەورە	Sengaw
	ژاڵەى بچوك	Sengaw
	حەمەى بارام	Sengaw
	دێى ڕەشە	Sengaw
	كانى مامە	Sengaw
	زەلە سووتاو	Sengaw
	شاحەسن (چۆڵ)	Sengaw
	شاحەسەنى تازە	Sengaw
	پنگڵەى دووەرى تازە	Sengaw
	پنگڵەى دووەر	Sengaw
	دووەر	Sengaw
	فەقێ حاجى	Sengaw
	هەشەزينى	Sengaw
	تيلەكۆى حەمەرەزا	Sengaw
	تەپە سورە	Sengaw
	گۆمەزەرد	Sengaw
	دەروێشانى گەورە	Sengaw
	دەروێشانى بچوك	Sengaw
	كەڵەرەشى حەمەسڵيمان	Sengaw
	كەڵەرەشى بچوك	Sengaw
	كەڵەرەشى گەورە	Sengaw
	جنۆكەى قازى شەل	Sengaw
	جنۆكەى غەيدان	Sengaw
	جنۆكەى فەتاح سەروو	Sengaw
	(جنۆكەى حەمەتاليب (چۆڵ	Sengaw
	پونگڵە	Sengaw
	زالواو	Sengaw
	كەريمەجەل	Sengaw
	گۆيژە	Sengaw
	عزەت ئاوا	Sengaw
	ميرەيى حەمە حەسەن	Sengaw
	خدرى سەروو	Sengaw
	خدرى خواروو	Sengaw
	كەڵەرەشى سڵيمان	Sengaw
	دلكە	Sengaw
	كانى خاكى	Sengaw
	همزە رۆمى	Sengaw
	هەنارەى سەروو	Sengaw
	هەنارەى خواروو	Sengaw
	قەڵاى شێخ رەشيد	Sengaw
	باخە گردەڵە	Sengaw
	ميرەيى حەوزەوار	Sengaw
	كەلان	Sengaw
	(قادراوا (چۆڵ	Sengaw
	مەسويى رەحيم	Sengaw
	سەرقەڵا	Sengaw
	(فاتكە (چۆڵ	Sengaw
	كچان	Sengaw
	كڕپچنە	Sengaw
	ژاڵەي كڕپچنە	Sengaw
	هەزاركانى	Sengaw
	ڕەبات	Sengaw
	(كارێزە (چۆڵ	Sengaw
	گەرەچيا	Sengaw
	تيمار	Sengaw
	زينانە	Sengaw
	پێنج ئەنگوستى خواروو	Sengaw
	پێنج ئەنگوستى سەروو	Sengaw
	خێڵي ئاخە	Sengaw
	سەيوەي	Sengaw
	ميراولى	Sengaw
	باجگە	Sengaw
	كارێزەى دەلۆ	Sengaw
	حەسەن كەنۆشى سەروو	Sengaw
	هێلانە قەل	Sengaw
	عەينكەى حەمەشاسوار	Sengaw
	تەپەعارەبى نەريمان	Sengaw
	عەينكەى سەعيدە رەش	Sengaw
	تەپەعارەبى حاجى مەعروف	Sengaw
	حسن كەنۆشى خواروو	Sengaw
	تەپەسپيى سەروو	Sengaw
	تەپەسپيى خواروو	Sengaw
	دۆ بڕاو	Sengaw
	كۆيك	Sengaw
	جامرێزى سەروو (ترشاوەكە)	Sengaw
	جامرێزى خواروو	Sengaw
	دەرزيلە	Sengaw
	درۆزنە	Sengaw
	(شەلەيى (چۆڵ	Sengaw
	سێ گۆمەتان	Sengaw
	كانى پەيتەش	Sengaw
	(هەنجيرە (چۆڵ	Sengaw
	داربەڕوو	Sengaw
	(شيوەباز (چۆڵ	Sengaw
	قەڵاگە	Sengaw
	كێلەبەرزە	Sengaw
	بانى مۆرد	Sengaw
	(شەريف ئاوا (چۆڵ	Sengaw
	دەروارەى سەروو	Sengaw
	كەوەڵە	Sengaw
	مەسويى بەرگەچ	Sengaw
	مەسويى بچوك	Sengaw
	مامران	Sengaw
	دەرەوارى خواروو	Sengaw
Tekiye	تەكيە	Tekiye
	كانى سارد	Tekiye
	چاڵگە	Tekiye
	مەنزەرئاوا	Tekiye
	لكاوە	Tekiye
	(لكاوەى كۆن (چۆڵ	Tekiye
	(لكاوەى تازە (چۆڵ	Tekiye
	(تەكيەى كاكەمەند (چۆڵ	Tekiye
	تەكيەى حەمە بايز	Tekiye
	تەكيەي كاكە عبدالله	Tekiye
	كانى بناو	Tekiye
	كانى چنار	Tekiye
	تەشكە	Tekiye
	خوامراد	Tekiye
	شۆرا ئاوا	Tekiye
	چوڵەمەكى سەروو	Tekiye
	فەريق ئاوا	Tekiye
	هەراوا	Tekiye
	حاجى ئاوا	Tekiye
	رەئووف ئاوا	Tekiye
	(چوڵەمەكى خواروو (چۆڵ	Tekiye
	خاڵدان	Tekiye
	ماروولە	Tekiye
	كانى مستەفا	Tekiye
	قشڵاخ	Tekiye
	توركە	Tekiye
	باوەفەتي خواروو	Tekiye
	باوەفەتي سەروو	Tekiye
	(كۆچك نەخشينە (چۆڵ	Tekiye
	شێخ وەيس	Tekiye
Axceler	ئاغجەلەر	Axceler
	عەسكەر	Axceler
	حەيدەربەگ	Axceler
	(شۆرجە (چۆڵ	Axceler
	گردخەبەر	Axceler
	چوخليجە	Axceler
	توتەقەل	Axceler
	گڵناغاجى گەورە	Axceler
	گڵناغاجى بچوك	Axceler
	كانى هەنجيرى شێخ بزێنى	Axceler
	ئەسكەندەر بەگ	Axceler
	ماملێسى	Axceler
	شێخان شێخ بزێنى	Axceler
	سەرچنار	Axceler
	جلمورد	Axceler
	مورد خواردى سەرو	Axceler
	دارەقوتە	Axceler
	ئاوبارە	Axceler
	مورد خواردى خواروو	Axceler
	گەڕاو	Axceler
	تەكباسان	Axceler
	(گوڵم كەوە (چۆڵ	Axceler
	پێدەر	Axceler
	محمەدخان	Axceler
	كانى گەوهەر	Axceler
	شێخ محمەد	Axceler
	تليان	Axceler
	تيژە	Axceler
	گەزەڵان	Axceler
	كانى عارەبان	Axceler
	گەزەڵان	Axceler
	تەق تەق	Axceler
	خڕبەندەلو	Axceler
	كانى سپيلكە	Axceler
	چياسەوز	Axceler
	قوڕاوە	Axceler
	تەوەكەڵى گەورە	Axceler
	تەوەكەڵى بچوك	Axceler
	تەوەكەڵى قەسركان	Axceler
	كانى هەنجيرى سالحوك	Axceler
	شێخ پاڵەوان	Axceler
	كۆزەبورە	Axceler
	داڵاوا كوردان	Axceler
	داڵاوا شێخ سالح	Axceler
	داڵاوا رووتە	Axceler
	قەڵاجوغەى شێخ كەريم	Axceler
	قەڵاجوغەى شێخ سەلام	Axceler
	گۆپتەپە	Axceler
	بولقاميش	Axceler
	بەردە عازەبان (چۆڵ)	Axceler
	شَيخان سورقاوشان	Axceler
	سوتكە	Axceler
	خرج حرج	Axceler
	مايلە	Axceler
	(كاني بي شێخ عەبدولڵا (چۆڵ	Axceler
	(كانى بۆگەنە (چۆڵ	Axceler
	بلوكێن	Axceler
	قەسرۆك	Axceler
	قودرەتە	Axceler
	مۆتليجە	Axceler
	چنارتو	Axceler
	ئازادي	Axceler
	قوچەلەر	Axceler
	گەڕگەڕ	Axceler
	(قۆچەبڵاخ (چۆڵ	Axceler
	گەورە دێ	Axceler
	كانى بى	Axceler
	قاميشە	Axceler
Qadirkerem	قادركەرەم	Qadirkerem
	داربەسەرە	Qadirkerem
	نەورۆز	Qadirkerem
	پارياوڵە	Qadirkerem
	عەلى مستەفا	Qadirkerem
	ئالياوا	Qadirkerem
	(كورە (چۆڵ	Qadirkerem
	گۆلەمە	Qadirkerem
	قەشقە	Qadirkerem
	(چەم سورخاو (چۆڵ	Qadirkerem
	ژاژ	Qadirkerem
	قەرەچێوار	Qadirkerem
	قەڵا ميكائيلى گەورە	Qadirkerem
	قەڵا ميكائيلى بچوك	Qadirkerem
	يۆڵە	Qadirkerem
	قايتەوەنى گەورە	Qadirkerem
	بەكر باجەلان	Qadirkerem
	وەستا خدر	Qadirkerem
	چنگنى	Qadirkerem
	چاڵەودوانە	Qadirkerem
	كۆرومورى گەورە	Qadirkerem
	كۆرومورى بچوك	Qadirkerem
	ئاوايى جەلال / فەرهاد بەگ	Qadirkerem
	تەختەميناى سەروو	Qadirkerem
	تەختەميناى خواروو	Qadirkerem
	(تەختە مينە (چۆڵ	Qadirkerem
	(بەهرام بەگ (چۆڵ	Qadirkerem
	بهرام بەگي شێخ حەميد	Qadirkerem
	(عەزيز بەگ (چۆڵ	Qadirkerem
	تازەشار	Qadirkerem
	مام يسك	Qadirkerem
	ئيبراهيم غوڵام	Qadirkerem
	شاوك	Qadirkerem
	هەرێنە	Qadirkerem
	گوڵباخى سەروو	Qadirkerem
	گوڵباخى خواروو	Qadirkerem
	قەيتول	Qadirkerem
	تەپەسپى	Qadirkerem
	قايتەوەنى بچوك	Qadirkerem
	گەڕاوى	Qadirkerem
	خدر ڕێحان	Qadirkerem
	(بنەكە (چۆڵ	Qadirkerem
	لەك هيدايەت	Qadirkerem
	دارەتووى زەنگەنە	Qadirkerem
	كانى قادرى شێخ محمەد فازل	Qadirkerem
	كانى قادرى شێخ مەجيد	Qadirkerem
	كانى قادرى شێخ سەعدون	Qadirkerem
	سۆفى رەزا	Qadirkerem
	ئاوباريك	Qadirkerem
	دارەتوو	Qadirkerem
	كۆشكى خواروو	Qadirkerem
	كۆشكى ناوەڕاست	Qadirkerem
	(كەريم باسام (چۆڵ	Qadirkerem
	قيرچە	Qadirkerem
	مشكى پان	Qadirkerem
	(كۆشكى شێخ محيەددين (كۆشكي سەروو	Qadirkerem
Tekiyeyî Cebarî	تەكيەى جەبارى	Tekiyeyî Cebarî
	تاوێرە بەرز	Tekiyeyî Cebarî
	حەمك	Tekiyeyî Cebarî
	پوزڵ	Tekiyeyî Cebarî
	زەردە	Tekiyeyî Cebarî
	سۆران	Tekiyeyî Cebarî
	مەحمود پەرێزە	Tekiyeyî Cebarî
	بانگۆڵ	Tekiyeyî Cebarî
	(شێخ محمەد (چۆڵ	Tekiyeyî Cebarî
	داووڵ	Tekiyeyî Cebarî
	قۆچەڵى	Tekiyeyî Cebarî
	جانى	Tekiyeyî Cebarî
	مۆردانە	Tekiyeyî Cebarî
	هەنارەى محمەد ئەمين	Tekiyeyî Cebarî
	هەنارەى محمەد شەريف	Tekiyeyî Cebarî
	هەنارەى محمەد سەعيد	Tekiyeyî Cebarî
	گوڵەبان	Tekiyeyî Cebarî
	زەوج	Tekiyeyî Cebarî
	(قەڵاويژ (چۆڵ	Tekiyeyî Cebarî
	گۆران جەباري	Tekiyeyî Cebarî
	كانى بايز	Tekiyeyî Cebarî

=== Derbendîxan District ===
Derbendîxan District consists of the two sub-districts of Derbendîxan and Bawexoşên. Derbendîxan is the capital of the district.

Name	Official name	Sub-district
Derbendîxan	ده‌ربه‌ندیخان	Derbendîxan
	تۆپخانه	Derbendîxan
	گوڵاني حاجي فه‌ره‌ج	Derbendîxan
	لالي خان عبدولقادر	Derbendîxan
	لالي خان حه‌مه‌ فه‌ره‌ج	Derbendîxan
	تازه‌دێی حاجی حه‌سه‌ن	Derbendîxan
	پونگه‌ڵه‌	Derbendîxan
	ئه‌حمه‌د بڕنده	Derbendîxan
	چناره	Derbendîxan
	حه‌سه‌نه‌ كاره	Derbendîxan
	بيركێ	Derbendîxan
	باني خێڵان	Derbendîxan
	ده‌ره‌دۆین	Derbendîxan
	سێداره	Derbendîxan
	عازه‌بان	Derbendîxan
	وازۆڵ	Derbendîxan
	قاشتي	Derbendîxan
	وڵوه‌ڕ	Derbendîxan
	توڵه‌بی	Derbendîxan
	(كانى سارد (چۆڵ	Derbendîxan
	شه‌مێران ئه‌حمه‌د به‌گ	Derbendîxan
	کانی که‌وه‌	Derbendîxan
	چه‌مه‌ڕه‌ش	Derbendîxan
	دۆڵي ناوحه‌د	Derbendîxan
	مۆرتكه	Derbendîxan
	باني بۆڵان	Derbendîxan
	سه‌رشاته‌ی خواروو	Derbendîxan
	(دێ سوتك (چۆڵ	Derbendîxan
	(لاوه‌ڕان (چۆڵ	Derbendîxan
	ده‌ڵفی سه‌روو	Derbendîxan
	(ده‌ڵفی خواروو (چۆڵ	Derbendîxan
	سه‌رشاته‌ی سه‌روو	Derbendîxan
	به‌شی عه‌لی	Derbendîxan
	(كاني ژه‌نان (چۆڵ	Derbendîxan
	گه‌ڕاو	Derbendîxan
	پشت قه‌ڵا	Derbendîxan
	(مله‌ که‌وه‌ (چۆڵ	Derbendîxan
	زاڕێن	Derbendîxan
	بێمارۆك	Derbendîxan
	كۆكۆي شه‌مێران	Derbendîxan
	ده‌نگه‌وه‌ره‌	Derbendîxan
	زمناكۆ	Derbendîxan
	وه‌رمن	Derbendîxan
	كارێزه	Derbendîxan
	که‌رکۆڵه‌	Derbendîxan
Bawexoşên	باوه‌خۆشێن	Bawexoşên
	(كاني حه‌یران (مچه كوێر	Bawexoşên
	(باوه‌خۆشێن (چۆڵ	Bawexoşên
	ئيمام قادر	Bawexoşên
	دێوانه	Bawexoşên
	فه‌قێ جنه‌	Bawexoşên
	چه‌مه‌رگه	Bawexoşên
	نه‌ژوێنی	Bawexoşên
	گوڵاني وه‌ستاکان	Bawexoşên
	گوڵاني حاجي كاك ئه‌وڵا	Bawexoşên
	گوڵانی حه‌مه‌ی مه‌حمود	Bawexoşên
	ناوتاق	Bawexoşên

=== Dokan District ===
Dokan District consists of the six sub-districts of Dokan, Surdaş, Pîremegrun, Xelekan, Xidran and Bingird. Dokan is the capital of the district.

Name	Official name	Sub-district
Dokan	دوكان	Dokan
	ته‌‌لان	Dokan
	كلكه‌‌ سماق	Dokan
	قه‌‌مچوغه‌‌	Dokan
	سارتكه‌‌	Dokan
	سورقاوشان	Dokan
	ڕكاوا	Dokan
	سه‌‌رمورد	Dokan
	قه‌‌ڵه‌‌م پاشا	Dokan
	تۆپزاوا	Dokan
	جۆبڵاخ	Dokan
	دۆڵه‌‌ مازله‌‌	Dokan
Surdaş	سورداش	Surdaş
	دولكان و كه‌‌ڵه‌‌باشي گه‌‌وره‌‌	Surdaş
	كاني شۆك	Surdaş
	خورده‌‌لووك	Surdaş
	شه‌‌ده‌‌ڵه‌‌	Surdaş
	پێداره‌‌	Surdaş
	عيسى به‌‌گي	Surdaş
	مێرگه‌‌پان	Surdaş
	هۆمه‌‌ر قه‌‌ئوم	Surdaş
	تيمار	Surdaş
	سردي گه‌‌وره‌‌	Surdaş
	سێ كانيان	Surdaş
	زه‌‌رزي	Surdaş
	شێخ زه‌‌ينه‌‌ڵ	Surdaş
	ده‌‌ره‌‌نار	Surdaş
	گێچينه‌‌	Surdaş
	كاني هه‌نجیر	Surdaş
	بيران	Surdaş
	جاسه‌‌نه‌‌	Surdaş
	هه‌‌ڵه‌‌دن	Surdaş
	سێ كانيانى شێخ باخ	Surdaş
	شێخ باخ	Surdaş
	سردي بچوك	Surdaş
	قه‌‌ره‌‌نگوێ	Surdaş
	قومه‌‌رغان	Surdaş
	مه‌‌ولان	Surdaş
	چاڵاوا	Surdaş
	ياخسه‌‌مه‌‌ر	Surdaş
	گوێزيله‌‌	Surdaş
Pîremegrun	پيره‌‌مه‌‌گرون	Pîremegrun
	قه‌‌ره‌‌چه‌‌تان	Pîremegrun
	چه‌‌رمه‌‌گا و گرژه‌‌	Pîremegrun
	ياران به‌‌گي	Pîremegrun
	كۆكه‌‌	Pîremegrun
	سوسێ	Pîremegrun
	موغاغ	Pîremegrun
	كاني ميران	Pîremegrun
	حاجيتان	Pîremegrun
	سابراوا و چاڵاغ	Pîremegrun
	كاني چنار	Pîremegrun
	گه‌‌به‌‌	Pîremegrun
	گوليجه‌‌	Pîremegrun
	بيراني كاني قاز	Pîremegrun
	شيله‌‌ خان	Pîremegrun
	قازان	Pîremegrun
	ته‌‌ڕه‌‌ماره‌‌	Pîremegrun
	زێوێ	Pîremegrun
	كه‌‌ڵه‌‌باشي قادر به‌‌گ	Pîremegrun
	باوه‌‌مه‌‌ندان	Pîremegrun
	زايه‌‌ر	Pîremegrun
	شوڕناخ	Pîremegrun
	كه‌‌ڵه‌‌شێره‌‌	Pîremegrun
	داربه‌‌ڕووله‌‌	Pîremegrun
	پيسكه‌‌ندى	Pîremegrun
	قايكه‌‌ند	Pîremegrun
	باخ و حه‌‌سه‌‌ن ته‌‌په‌‌	Pîremegrun
	عه‌‌واڵان	Pîremegrun
	قۆچ بڵاخ	Pîremegrun
	ياڵانقۆز	Pîremegrun
	كاني ‌‌هه‌‌نجیری عه‌‌واڵان	Pîremegrun
	گورگه‌‌ده‌‌ر	Pîremegrun
	گرده‌‌بۆر	Pîremegrun
Xelekan	خه‌‌له‌‌كان	Xelekan
	باداوان	Xelekan
	باقلان	Xelekan
	كاني وه‌‌تمان	Xelekan
	شێخ مه‌‌نسوريان	Xelekan
	كاني مازوو	Xelekan
	كاني شێران و ئاريشه‌‌	Xelekan
	قه‌‌ڵات	Xelekan
	شێخ حاجي	Xelekan
	شاروقاميشه‌‌	Xelekan
	قاميشه‌‌	Xelekan
	فريزه‌‌ڵه‌‌	Xelekan
Xidran	خدران	Xidran
	ميرزا رۆسته‌‌مي گه‌‌وره‌‌	Xidran
	(ميرزا رۆسته‌‌مي بچوك (چۆڵ	Xidran
	(پێسپيان (چۆڵ	Xidran
	تۆربه‌‌	Xidran
	گرده‌‌سوران	Xidran
	كاني بناو	Xidran
	بنگردان	Xidran
	توه‌‌ڕه‌‌ش	Xidran
	چناران	Xidran
	ئه‌‌حمه‌‌د ئاوا	Xidran
	عاليقه‌‌ي سه‌‌روو	Xidran
	(عاليقه‌‌ي خواروو (چۆڵ	Xidran
	هه‌‌نجیرۆک	Xidran
	شوشكه‌‌	Xidran
	شيوه‌‌ئاشان	Xidran
Kelkan	كلكان	Xidran
	باسه‌‌ڕه‌‌	Xidran
	مێوژه‌‌	Xidran
	كورداوا	Xidran
	ده‌‌رمان ئاوا	Xidran
	كاني ئه‌‌سپان	Xidran
	(كه‌‌ڵه‌‌ مێوه‌‌ (چۆڵ	Xidran
	(ئه‌‌سكۆڵان (چۆڵ	Xidran
Bingird	بنگرد	Bingird
	په‌‌ڵگۆ	Bingird
	خۆشاو	Bingird
	هه‌‌نجیره‌‌	Bingird
	كونه‌‌ماره‌‌	Bingird
	واتێ	Bingird
	ته‌‌نگژه‌‌	Bingird
	بێ موشه‌‌	Bingird
	سێناچيان	Bingird
	سێوكان	Bingird
	به‌‌رده‌‌شاني سه‌‌روو	Bingird
	به‌‌رده‌‌شاني خواروو	Bingird
	مه‌‌مه‌‌ند ئاوا	Bingird
	كوێره‌‌ كاني	Bingird
	شارستێن	Bingird
	قه‌‌ره‌‌ته‌‌په‌‌	Bingird
	دێلێژه‌‌	Bingird
	لبانه‌‌	Bingird
	سێده‌‌ر	Bingird
	دۆڵه‌‌بي	Bingird
	گۆمه‌‌زه‌‌ڵ	Bingird
	خوڕخوڕه‌‌	Bingird
	ياخيان	Bingird
	مه‌‌رگه‌‌	Bingird
	كێله‌‌سپي	Bingird
	به‌‌رده‌‌كۆز	Bingird
	سه‌‌رسيان	Bingird
	هه‌‌واره‌‌به‌‌رزه‌‌	Bingird
	مه‌‌لا سه‌‌فا	Bingird
	بێگمه‌‌	Bingird
	بناويله‌‌	Bingird
	ناوده‌‌شت	Bingird
	گرمكان	Bingird
	كه‌‌له‌‌كان	Bingird
	خانه‌‌ڵێ	Bingird
	كاني هه‌‌نجیر	Bingird
	سه‌‌رچيا	Bingird
	سوفيان	Bingird
	كاني توو	Bingird
	چنارنه‌‌	Bingird
	كاني شينكه‌‌	Bingird
	سيروان	Bingird
	ئاوه‌‌ژێ	Bingird
	لۆته‌‌ر	Bingird
	بێوه‌‌كه‌‌	Bingird
	هه‌‌ڵوه‌‌نه‌‌	Bingird
	نۆڵچكه‌‌	Bingird
	پاشكێش	Bingird
	دۆڵه‌‌گۆم	Bingird
	سه‌‌رته‌‌نگ	Bingird
	نێزۆكه‌‌	Bingird
	بێ خرێ	Bingird
	وه‌‌يسه‌‌	Bingird

=== Kalar District ===
Kalar District consists of the four sub-districts of Kalar, Rizgarî, Pêbaz and Şêx Tewîl. Kalar is the capital of the district.

Name	Official name	Sub-district
Kalar	كەلار	Kalar
	چەمە بيسم الله	Kalar
	قاسم ئاغا	Kalar
	سەيد خەليل فەقێ مستەفا	Kalar
	سەيدخەليل خەليفە	Kalar
	سەيد خەليل دەروێش حوسێن	Kalar
	گۆبان	Kalar
	گەرمك حاجي عەلي	Kalar
	قەرەچێڵ	Kalar
	نازێي گەورە	Kalar
	نازێي بچوك	Kalar
	توركە	Kalar
	زەماوەنگە	Kalar
	ژاڵەي سەفەر	Kalar
	مچەشەل	Kalar
	بەرلوت	Kalar
	حەسەن مەحە	Kalar
	چاڵەڕەش	Kalar
	چاڵەڕەشي كۆن	Kalar
	عيسايي	Kalar
	قوڵە سوتاو	Kalar
	تازەدێ	Kalar
	بەردەسور	Kalar
	بەردەسوري محمدامين	Kalar
	گێژەكان	Kalar
Rizgarî	رزگارى	Rizgarî
	ژاڵان ڕۆبيتان	Rizgarî
	سماق	Rizgarî
	فەرج وەيسي حەمە رەئوف	Rizgarî
	فەرج وەيسي روستەم	Rizgarî
	فەرج وەيسي مەحمود	Rizgarî
	قەڵاڕيويلەى سەروو	Rizgarî
	قەڵاڕيويلەى خوراوو	Rizgarî
	تيلەكۆي گەورە	Rizgarî
	سەركەلى مارف	Rizgarî
	سەركەلى عەزيز	Rizgarî
	سەركەلى خەسرەو	Rizgarî
	ژاڵان ڕوغزايي	Rizgarî
	هەزاركاني	Rizgarî
	كونە كۆتر	Rizgarî
	پيازە جاڕ	Rizgarî
	ملە سور	Rizgarî
	قەڵا قوچاڵي	Rizgarî
	سێ خران	Rizgarî
	گامە خەڵ	Rizgarî
	گۆمەزەردي سەروو	Rizgarî
	گۆمەزەردي خواروو	Rizgarî
	(سێ گردان (چۆڵ	Rizgarî
	تەپەسەوز	Rizgarî
	گوڕمسقاڵ	Rizgarî
	گوڵە جۆي حەمە جان	Rizgarî
	تولە بێ	Rizgarî
	هەوارەبەرزە	Rizgarî
	تەيمانە	Rizgarî
	تيلەكۆي بچوك	Rizgarî
	زەردي خەليفە مەحمود	Rizgarî
	زەردي قادر	Rizgarî
	زەردي حەمە	Rizgarî
	خەڵوە	Rizgarî
	ئەحمەد ئاواى شاترى	Rizgarî
	ئەحمەد ئاواى روخزارى	Rizgarî
	ناوە	Rizgarî
	سەرناوە	Rizgarî
	(هەوارە لارە (چۆڵ	Rizgarî
	پەڵە وشك	Rizgarî
	توراني شێخ سەعيد	Rizgarî
	توراني شێخ سەلام	Rizgarî
	توراني بابا رەسول	Rizgarî
	قەبري مەلا	Rizgarî
	زەڕێن	Rizgarî
	بوقە	Rizgarî
	شۆراوە	Rizgarî
	دوخڕان	Rizgarî
	كاني زەرد	Rizgarî
	مەنسور ئەلكان	Rizgarî
	بووەكە	Rizgarî
	سەيد خدر	Rizgarî
	حەمەى مەحمود	Rizgarî
	كيژۆك	Rizgarî
	كاني چايلەي خواروو	Rizgarî
	كاني چايلەي سەروو	Rizgarî
	توە قوت	Rizgarî
	دووميلاني سەروو	Rizgarî
	دووميلاني خواروو	Rizgarî
	حاجي قازي	Rizgarî
	دەنگەوەران	Rizgarî
	گەرمكي شاتري	Rizgarî
	ميوەكەي خواروو	Rizgarî
	ميوەكەي سەروو	Rizgarî
	حەسەن ئەمنە	Rizgarî
	خاڵە بەگ	Rizgarî
	بنەبەرازي سەروو	Rizgarî
	كاني كەوە	Rizgarî
	قەڵبەزە	Rizgarî
	گڵال كەوەي حاجي ناميق	Rizgarî
Pêbaz	پێباز	Pêbaz
	رندي عەلي خان	Pêbaz
	پێ رەش	Pêbaz
	قولەبەرز	Pêbaz
	سەي مەحمود	Pêbaz
	(باوەنور (چۆڵ	Pêbaz
	گڵاڵ كەوەي حاجي محمەد	Pêbaz
	ژاڵەي حاجي قادر	Pêbaz
	(سۆفي رەحيمى عەلي قادر (صوفي وەن	Pêbaz
	يارمەند	Pêbaz
	پاڕێوڵەي گەورە	Pêbaz
	ئاوەخوێڕي	Pêbaz
	پاڕێوڵەي بچوك	Pêbaz
	(گەرمكە ڕەش (چۆڵ	Pêbaz
	باني خان	Pêbaz
	دڕكەي خواروو	Pêbaz
	دڕكەي سەروو	Pêbaz
	سۆفي رەحيم ڕەزا بەگ	Pêbaz
	وڕێڵە	Pêbaz
	رۆستەم شامار	Pêbaz
	زاووت	Pêbaz
	هۆمەرە خەجاني عەلي حەمين	Pêbaz
	هۆمەرە خەجاني والي	Pêbaz
	كۆزەكۆڵ	Pêbaz
	هەوارە ڕەقە	Pêbaz
	(قوڕباق (چۆڵ	Pêbaz
	(ئەسحاو (چۆڵ	Pêbaz
	كڵاوكەوەى ڕۆغزايى	Pêbaz
	ڕازيان	Pêbaz
	(ڕەواتي (چۆڵ	Pêbaz
	كێلە سپي	Pêbaz
	زەنگەكەي گەورە	Pêbaz
	زەنگەكەي بچوك	Pêbaz
Şêx Tewîl	شێخ تەويل	Şêx Tewîl
	كوردەميري ئەحمد	Şêx Tewîl
	قەڵا ڕەويلە	Şêx Tewîl
	كەڵەشێرەي خواروو	Şêx Tewîl
	قەڵاتۆپزان	Şêx Tewîl
	كەڵەشێرەي سەروو	Şêx Tewîl
	كەڵەشێرەى حەمەى زۆراب	Şêx Tewîl
	ترشاكەى خواروو	Şêx Tewîl
	ترشاكەى سەروو	Şêx Tewîl
	گردە ڕەش	Şêx Tewîl
	مراوە	Şêx Tewîl
	چەمي شوراوە	Şêx Tewîl
	(شێخ تەويل (چۆڵ	Şêx Tewîl
	بێستانە	Şêx Tewîl
	بەكر بايف	Şêx Tewîl
	دارەونكە	Şêx Tewîl
	بەرگەل	Şêx Tewîl
	بسكان	Şêx Tewîl
	چرچەقەڵا	Şêx Tewîl
	زەردەليكاو	Şêx Tewîl
	تەپە گاڕووس	Şêx Tewîl
	قەڵاي تەپە گاڕووس	Şêx Tewîl
	تم تەمە	Şêx Tewîl
	كوڵە كەوە	Şêx Tewîl
	گۆڕي ئەسپ	Şêx Tewîl
	كاني گوڵي سەروو	Şêx Tewîl
	تالەوان	Şêx Tewîl
	تازەدێي ئيمام محمەد	Şêx Tewîl
	ئيمام محمەد	Şêx Tewîl
	توركەي روبيتن	Şêx Tewîl
	چيا چەرمك	Şêx Tewîl
	تورەجار	Şêx Tewîl
	عومەر ئاغا جان عەلي حسێن	Şêx Tewîl
	كوردەميرى بارام	Şêx Tewîl
	كوردەميرى حەمە سلێمان	Şêx Tewîl
	كوردەميرى حاجي حەمە ئەمين	Şêx Tewîl
	كوردەميري فەقىَ حسێن	Şêx Tewîl
	براوە گەلأ	Şêx Tewîl
	تيلەكۆي قەلەندەر	Şêx Tewîl
	سەي بێخان	Şêx Tewîl
	كوردەميرى مارف سەيداد	Şêx Tewîl
	زەينەڵ	Şêx Tewîl
	(كوردەميرى قەلوەز و لوقمان (چۆڵ	Şêx Tewîl
	چاڵە ڕەشى روخزايى	Şêx Tewîl
	بەردە كونار	Şêx Tewîl

=== Kifrî District ===
Kifrî District consists of the five sub-districts of Kifrî, Awespî, Serqella, Newcul and Koks. Kifrî is the capital of the district.

Name	Official name	Sub-district
Kifrî	كفرى	Kifrî
	دوانزە ئيمام	Kifrî
	سەرچەم	Kifrî
Awespî	ئاوەسپى	Awespî
	كاكەبرا	Awespî
	تەپەسپي	Awespî
	عەلياني گەورە	Awespî
	كۆيك	Awespî
	قەڵاچەرمەڵە	Awespî
	عەلياني بچوك	Awespî
	(خەپە كوێر (چۆڵ	Awespî
	هەوارە قوڵە	Awespî
	لەكي قادر سەرهەنگ	Awespî
	باوەكڕ	Awespî
	ڕەمەزان شەشە	Awespî
	بەكرە كەرە	Awespî
	عبدالله هۆري	Awespî
	تەلەبي	Awespî
	زۆراب بەگزادە	Awespî
	حەسەن پڕچن	Awespî
	تيلەگۆى ئەحمەد ئاغا	Awespî
	تەكي كۆن	Awespî
	سپي سەر	Awespî
	پيرمۆني	Awespî
	هەرمۆڵە	Awespî
	تۆپخانە	Awespî
	فقێ مستەفا	Awespî
	تاوسانە	Awespî
	رەمەكان	Awespî
	قەواڵي	Awespî
	كاني عوبێد	Awespî
	بنكەى شانەزەر	Awespî
	بانزينخال	Awespî
	خان رەئوف	Awespî
	قوليجاني سەرحەد	Awespî
	قوليجاني ئەمين قارەمان	Awespî
	سەرەڕەش	Awespî
	مەلە هۆمەر	Awespî
	ئيبراهيم غوڵام	Awespî
	كەريم باسام	Awespî
Serqella	سەرقەڵا	Serqella
	هومەر بەلى گەورە	Serqella
	هومەر بەلى بچووك	Serqella
	ميل قاسمي گەورە	Serqella
	حەسيرە	Serqella
	كاني ماران	Serqella
	چوارشاخي سەروو	Serqella
	چوارشاخي خواروو	Serqella
	توكن	Serqella
	عەزيز قادر	Serqella
	وەلي هەيەر	Serqella
	فەتاح هۆمەر	Serqella
	سەي جەژني	Serqella
	ئيبراهيم خان	Serqella
	شەرەف خان	Serqella
	(ميل قاسمي بچوك (چۆڵ	Serqella
	درۆزنەي گەورە	Serqella
	درۆزنەي بچوك	Serqella
	نا سالح	Serqella
	يەكە چاڵاو	Serqella
	پاشا	Serqella
	چاڵە سووك	Serqella
	گۆبان عەرەب	Serqella
	كاكۆڵي	Serqella
	ئەوڵا قوت	Serqella
	زەكي حاجي عەواد	Serqella
	بەكرە شەل	Serqella
	بەلەكەي گەورە	Serqella
	بەلەكەي بچوك	Serqella
	سەعداوا	Serqella
	كەواچەرموو	Serqella
	دێبنە	Serqella
	سەيدە	Serqella
	كارێزي حەمە كەيفە	Serqella
	شاكەل	Serqella
Newcul	نەوجول	Newcul
	قەلغانلوي گەورە	Newcul
	قەلغانلوي بچوك	Newcul
	ميل ناسر	Newcul
	كوڵە كانى	Newcul
	شوراوى حەمە غەريب	Newcul
	سنكور	Newcul
	واراني سەروو	Newcul
	پەلكانى سادە	Newcul
	خدر وەلى تازە	Newcul
	(پەلكانەي سالم (چۆڵ	Newcul
	نەوجول	Newcul
	قۆشلان	Newcul
	لەك	Newcul
	گۆمەيي	Newcul
	قۆم بەلەك	Newcul
	قەڵا	Newcul
	(دێى حەسەن (چۆڵ	Newcul
	(ساڵەيي (بانەشيخ	Newcul
	دوراجي	Newcul
	چەوري	Newcul
	ئاغزەمەرشن	Newcul
	تاڵاو	Newcul
	عومەر سۆفي	Newcul
	(ئيمام محمەد رەشيد ئاغا نامق (چۆڵ	Newcul
	كوچك پاشتەپ	Newcul
	(گوندي عەلي (چۆڵ	Newcul
	ناميق	Newcul
	(سەفەربەيات (چەچان	Newcul
	ڕەزا	Newcul
	بيوك باشتەپە	Newcul
	لوتفني ئاغا	Newcul
	كۆشكي بەرەومنارە	Newcul
	عەرەب ئاغا	Newcul
	واراني خواروو	Newcul
	واراني بان غار	Newcul
	زيلانەى ژوروو	Newcul
	گەرمك	Newcul
	حەيدەرە سورە	Newcul
	سەروچاوە	Newcul
	چوار ڕوو	Newcul
	مەحمود بەگ	Newcul
	تاوەدێ	Newcul
	كۆمە تەپوور	Newcul
	شۆراو	Newcul
Koks	كۆكس	Koks
	چاڵۆ خالد	Koks
	(شيلان (چۆڵ	Koks
	(خياڵ (چۆڵ	Koks
	(سامي (چۆڵ	Koks
	(گزنگ (چۆڵ	Koks
	تازەشار	Koks
	بان سندوق	Koks
	(جديدە (چۆڵ	Koks
	حاجى حەسەن	Koks
	عەلى خەلەف	Koks
	رەحيم وەرەقە	Koks
	سەيد حەسەن	Koks
	(چەتاڵ (چۆڵ	Koks
	قەرەبوڵاغي كۆن	Koks
	قەرەبوڵاغي برا حەمە	Koks
	سيامەڕۆ	Koks
	بان ئاسياو	Koks
	ئاوبارە	Koks
	گومار	Koks
	تەپە عەلي	Koks
	تەپە قەوى	Koks
	تەپە گزن	Koks
	قچ قرخ	Koks
	سيتەپان	Koks
	(سەي موراد (چۆڵ	Koks
	(محمەد سەليم (چۆڵ	Koks
	لەلبن	Koks
	حاجي لەر	Koks
	(تەپەسەرايي (چۆڵ	Koks
	شيخ لەنگەري گەورە	Koks
	شيخ لەنگەري بچوك	Koks
	(حسێن كوردي (چۆڵ	Koks
	چاڵە سورك	Koks
	(سەيد مال الله (چۆڵ	Koks
	(چاڵەڕەش (چۆڵ	Koks
	(سالم (چۆڵ	Koks
	پيرە فەقيرە	Koks

=== Mawat District ===
Mawat District consists of the sub-district of Mawat. Mawat is the capital of the district.

Name	Official name	Sub-district
Mawat	ماوه‌ت	Mawat
	كێلێ	Mawat
	سوره‌قه‌ڵات	Mawat
	ياڵان قۆز	Mawat
	دڕي	Mawat
	سه‌راو	Mawat
	شه‌شۆ	Mawat
	كوڕه‌ داوێ	Mawat
	به‌رده‌شين	Mawat
	به‌زه‌ڕوو	Mawat
	باناڵێ	Mawat
	ئامادين	Mawat
	كونجرين	Mawat
	گابه‌روا	Mawat
	قه‌شان	Mawat
	گوڵێ	Mawat
	ميراوا	Mawat
	سچيداره‌	Mawat
	سه‌رگه‌ڵو	Mawat
	كۆلكه‌	Mawat
	عيساوێ	Mawat
	خه‌زێنه‌	Mawat
	ژاژڵه‌	Mawat
	بڵخوان	Mawat
	ده‌شتي خانێ	Mawat
	باساوێ	Mawat
	گه‌ڵاڵه‌	Mawat
	سه‌فره‌	Mawat
	شينكێ	Mawat
	به‌ربه‌رد	Mawat
	قاميش	Mawat
	زه‌رون	Mawat
	ئاوه‌كورتێ	Mawat
	قه‌ڵاته‌	Mawat
	به‌رگورد	Mawat
	ئه‌زمك	Mawat
	زه‌ينه‌ڵ و قه‌ره‌بابه‌	Mawat
	هه‌نجيره‌ سوره‌	Mawat
	گه‌ماڵان	Mawat
	ناور	Mawat
	شاناخسێ	Mawat
	گرگاشه‌	Mawat
	ماشان	Mawat

=== Pşdar District ===
Pşdar District consists of the six sub-districts of Qelladizê, Hêro, Hellşo, Jarawa, Nawdeşit and Îsêwê. Qelladizê is the capital of the district.

Name	Official name	Sub-district
Qelladizê	قه‌ڵادزێ	Qelladizê
	ميرتكه‌ و ريشوان	Qelladizê
	برايم ئاوا	Qelladizê
	سندوڵان	Qelladizê
	چۆمى كانيان	Qelladizê
	ده‌قناوه‌	Qelladizê
	گوێزيله‌	Qelladizê
	پیران	Qelladizê
	بنه‌وشان	Qelladizê
	هه‌ڵاوێژه‌	Qelladizê
	نوره‌دين	Qelladizê
	ده‌لكه‌	Qelladizê
	سريجه‌	Qelladizê
	سيد احمدان	Qelladizê
	كه‌وى بابه‌سه‌ن	Qelladizê
	ئاڵان	Qelladizê
	داوديه‌	Qelladizê
	كوشكه‌ڵه‌	Qelladizê
	جوم خركه‌	Qelladizê
	حه‌سار	Qelladizê
	گرد مه‌يته‌ر	Qelladizê
	به‌رد به‌رد	Qelladizê
	دورێ	Qelladizê
	باده‌ڵيان	Qelladizê
	گرده سپيان	Qelladizê
	تووه‌ ڕه‌شان	Qelladizê
	كه‌ستانه‌	Qelladizê
	خره‌به‌ردان	Qelladizê
	كۆلاره‌	Qelladizê
	به‌رسول	Qelladizê
	كه‌ويه‌	Qelladizê
	بادين	Qelladizê
	وه‌ستا سيمان	Qelladizê
	دێرێ	Qelladizê
	پێماڵك	Qelladizê
Hêro	هێرۆ	Hêro
	ده‌روينه	Hêro
	مڕه‌	Hêro
	شڵه مڕه‌	Hêro
	بێشير	Hêro
	ئاوه‌که	Hêro
	بێناسه	Hêro
	بێكڵۆ	Hêro
	سێوه‌ڵه	Hêro
	کۆخه‌لێس	Hêro
	گيره	Hêro
	تيكه به‌رده	Hêro
	وه‌سوێنه	Hêro
Hellşo	هه‌ڵشو	Hellşo
	دێلو	Hellşo
	ئه‌مه‌ر کاکوڵژ	Hellşo
	شیوه‌ره‌ز	Hellşo
	شۆران	Hellşo
	دۆڵه‌ دزه‌	Hellşo
	ئاڵاوه‌	Hellşo
	بێ گه‌لاس	Hellşo
	هورێوه‌	Hellşo
	شێنێ	Hellşo
	سونێ	Hellşo
	شێخ ئاوده‌لان	Hellşo
	كانيلان	Hellşo
	هه‌ڵشۆ	Hellşo
	داره‌شمانه‌	Hellşo
	ته‌نگژه‌	Hellşo
Jarawa	ژاراوا	Jarawa
	ژاراواى كۆن	Jarawa
	سوڵتانه دڵ	Jarawa
	که‌رسۆنان	Jarawa
	تۆپزاوا	Jarawa
	دۆڵه‌ به‌فره	Jarawa
	به‌لک	Jarawa
	خه‌نده‌که	Jarawa
	سپيرۆ	Jarawa
	دوو چۆمان	Jarawa
	قه‌لاوه‌	Jarawa
	باره پانه	Jarawa
	سیده‌ڵان	Jarawa
	شروێت	Jarawa
	زودان	Jarawa
	درگه‌ڵه‌ی مه‌نگۆڕ	Jarawa
	گرد ئێستر	Jarawa
	كوڵكوڵه	Jarawa
	كوزينه	Jarawa
	سه‌رخان	Jarawa
	زێوكه‌	Jarawa
	به‌ستێ	Jarawa
	توتمه‌	Jarawa
	سوره‌ گڵه‌	Jarawa
	ره‌زكه‌	Jarawa
	سپيه گڵه و شناوه	Jarawa
	ماره دوو و ئه‌رکه	Jarawa
Nawdeşit	ناوده‌شت	Nawdeşit
	کۆمه‌ڵه	Nawdeşit
	تووه سوران	Nawdeşit
	خڕه چه‌و	Nawdeşit
	که‌نجاڕه‌ی کوێخا قادر	Nawdeşit
	ئاشوران	Nawdeşit
	چۆمه سوتاو	Nawdeşit
	شه‌هیدان	Nawdeşit
	زونگ	Nawdeşit
	دوو گومان	Nawdeşit
	گرتك	Nawdeşit
	ده‌لوه كۆتر	Nawdeşit
	سێوه‌یس	Nawdeşit
	بیه‌ ڕه‌ش	Nawdeşit
	شارۆش	Nawdeşit
	گه‌لۆی ماخ و بزنان	Nawdeşit
	پيران و جه‌لکان	Nawdeşit
	به‌رد كوڕان	Nawdeşit
	پشت ئاشان	Nawdeşit
	قڕنا قاو	Nawdeşit
	ئه‌ستێرۆکان	Nawdeşit
	سڵێ	Nawdeşit
	زارگه‌ڵی	Nawdeşit
	ليندزه	Nawdeşit
	باراوى سه‌روو و خواروو	Nawdeşit
	(زه‌نگلان (مه‌مکان	Nawdeşit
	بایه‌وان	Nawdeşit
	كۆمتان	Nawdeşit
	بولى	Nawdeşit
	بيانه	Nawdeşit
	كوبنكه	Nawdeşit
	شيوه	Nawdeşit
	دوێڵه	Nawdeşit
	لێوژه	Nawdeşit
	بۆكريسكان	Nawdeşit
	ڕه‌ژی که‌ری	Nawdeşit
	بڕه‌دێ	Nawdeşit
	برد مه‌مکه	Nawdeşit
Îsêwê	ئیسێوێ	Îsêwê
	قندۆڵ	Îsêwê
	ده‌وزان	Îsêwê
	گه‌ناو	Îsêwê
	چه‌کوان	Îsêwê
	ده‌شتیو	Îsêwê
	چمكاوه	Îsêwê
	ئه‌شکه‌نه	Îsêwê
	کونه‌ گه‌ناو	Îsêwê
	باوزێ	Îsêwê
	رازان	Îsêwê
	سه‌رشیو	Îsêwê
	ئيسيوي	Îsêwê
	گواران	Îsêwê

=== Qeredax District ===
Qeredax District consists of the two sub-districts of Qeredax and Sêwsênan. Qeredax is the capital of the district.

Name	Official name	Sub-district
Qeredax	قه‌ره‌داخ	Qeredax
	باخان	Qeredax
	وليان	Qeredax
	تله‌زه‌‌یت	Qeredax
	بانی خێڵان	Qeredax
	سوێراوا	Qeredax
	ئه‌لياوا	Qeredax
	زه‌‌ید عومه‌ري سه‌روو و خواروو	Qeredax
	ميرياسي خواروو	Qeredax
	تافان	Qeredax
	سه‌ركۆ	Qeredax
	ده‌لوجه‌	Qeredax
	كاني ههنار	Qeredax
	دوكان	Qeredax
	خاوێ	Qeredax
	قاره‌مان	Qeredax
	سۆلياوا	Qeredax
	ميرياسي سه‌روو	Qeredax
	داري زايين	Qeredax
	دوكه‌رۆ	Qeredax
	نه‌وتي	Qeredax
	ده‌ره‌وياني سه‌روو و خواروو	Qeredax
	جافه‌ران	Qeredax
	قه‌‌ڵا قايمس	Qeredax
	شيوي قازي	Qeredax
	گۆشان	Qeredax
	سۆڵه‌ و مچه‌كوێر	Qeredax
	تيمار	Qeredax
	قۆپي	Qeredax
	ههڵده‌ره‌	Qeredax
	قازانقايه‌	Qeredax
	مێوڵي	Qeredax
	كه‌سنه‌زان	Qeredax
	بلكان	Qeredax
	فه‌قيره‌	Qeredax
	قاميشان	Qeredax
	دۆڵاني سه‌روو و خواروو	Qeredax
	گه‌ڕه‌زيل	Qeredax
	فيكه‌ده‌ره‌	Qeredax
	ته‌نگي سه‌ر	Qeredax
	كونه‌ كۆتر	Qeredax
	كاني قه‌‌یسه‌ر	Qeredax
	ابراه‌‌یم ئاوا	Qeredax
	سه‌رزه‌ل	Qeredax
	گورباز	Qeredax
	سۆڵه‌‌ی ده‌ربه‌ند	Qeredax
	مريه‌م به‌گ	Qeredax
	ههرگێنه‌	Qeredax
	كاني رۆشنايي	Qeredax
	قه‌‌ڵاسوره‌	Qeredax
	دێلێژه‌	Qeredax
Sêwsênan	سێوسێنان	Sêwsênan
	ئه‌ستێڵي ئاشان	Sêwsênan
	ئه‌ستێڵي سه‌روو	Sêwsênan
	سێوسێنان	Sêwsênan
	به‌ڵخه‌‌ی سه‌روو و خواروو	Sêwsênan
	ته‌كيه‌	Sêwsênan
	كه‌ڵۆش	Sêwsênan
	مه‌سۆيي	Sêwsênan
	چه‌مي سمۆر	Sêwsênan
	ه‌ۆمه‌رقه‌‌ڵا	Sêwsênan
	گۆمه‌ته‌	Sêwsênan

=== Pêncwîn District ===
Pêncwîn District consists of the three sub-districts of Pêncwîn, Germik and Nallparêz. Pêncwîn is the capital of the district.

Name	Official name	Sub-district
Pêncwîn	پێنجوین	Pêncwîn
	راوگان	Pêncwîn
	نزاره‌	Pêncwîn
	كواوه‌	Pêncwîn
	بوبان	Pêncwîn
	احمد كلوان	Pêncwîn
	كانى مانگا	Pêncwîn
	ده‌ربه‌ند	Pêncwîn
	هه‌ڵاڵاوا	Pêncwîn
	مه‌سۆ	Pêncwîn
	كێلو	Pêncwîn
	ئاڵياوا	Pêncwîn
	ده‌ره‌گورگان	Pêncwîn
	كانى ميرانى باباعلى	Pêncwîn
	كانى شابان	Pêncwîn
	كانى ميرانى كۆمارى	Pêncwîn
	هۆمه‌رسێنان	Pêncwîn
	ساڵياوا	Pêncwîn
	ابراهيم ئاوا	Pêncwîn
	ميرمام	Pêncwîn
	قزڵجه‌	Pêncwîn
	خونيانه‌	Pêncwîn
	بناويان	Pêncwîn
	هه‌رگێنه‌	Pêncwîn
	بناوه‌سوته‌	Pêncwîn
	سه‌رنه‌وان	Pêncwîn
	بلكيان	Pêncwîn
Germik	گه‌رمك	Germik
	نه‌رزه‌نه‌	Germik
	براله‌	Germik
	سه‌ربراله‌	Germik
	ميراوا	Germik
	باراوه‌ كۆن	Germik
	سياگوێز	Germik
	ته‌ڕه‌ تووله‌ و تازه‌دێ	Germik
	چاش	Germik
	عه‌واڵان	Germik
	گۆخلان	Germik
	باليكه‌ده‌ر	Germik
	لاله‌ده‌ر	Germik
	به‌رانكانى	Germik
	باده‌ڵانى	Germik
	قشڵاخ	Germik
	چه‌رمه‌گا	Germik
	كانى بي	Germik
	سوراو	Germik
	هه‌نگه‌ژاڵ	Germik
	بێستانه‌	Germik
	داڵه‌رۆ	Germik
	زه‌نگير	Germik
	له‌نگه‌دێ	Germik
	داڕۆخان	Germik
	وێنه‌	Germik
	ماسيده‌ر	Germik
	شيوه‌ گوێزان	Germik
	دۆڵه‌بى	Germik
	تاتان	Germik
	به‌هێ	Germik
	سه‌رسوراو	Germik
	باراوى تازه‌	Germik
	دێزه‌	Germik
	قه‌له‌نده‌راوه‌	Germik
	كانى هه‌رمێ	Germik
	گلاراوا	Germik
	چوێسه‌	Germik
	ئيسماعيل ئاوا	Germik
	گوڵێ	Germik
	هۆبه‌ سوته‌	Germik
	شێره‌	Germik
	سريستان	Germik
	گڵينه‌ى نسێ	Germik
	گلێنه‌ى به‌رۆژ	Germik
	مێشه‌رۆ	Germik
	قوسامه‌ددين	Germik
	سه‌يرانه‌	Germik
	ئه‌حمه‌دئاوا	Germik
	ميراول	Germik
	كه‌ره‌گه‌ڵ	Germik
	بێماوه‌	Germik
	لالۆمه‌ره‌	Germik
	كونه‌ وشك	Germik
	گۆيژه‌ ڕه‌شان	Germik
	پاش به‌رد	Germik
	ميشياو	Germik
	نه‌رمه‌ڵاس	Germik
	(شه‌هيدان (شه‌يان	Germik
	قۆخه‌ ڵاڵ	Germik
Nallparêz	ناڵپارێز	Nallparêz
	خڕنوك	Nallparêz
	كانى سپيكه‌	Nallparêz
	كانى سه‌يفى شێخ حامد	Nallparêz
	توتمانى سه‌روو	Nallparêz
	دۆڵه‌چه‌وت	Nallparêz
	جۆمه‌ره‌سي	Nallparêz
	كوڕى گه‌بڵه‌	Nallparêz
	ياساماڵ	Nallparêz
	ته‌ڕه‌ته‌وه‌ن	Nallparêz
	دۆڵه‌سوور	Nallparêz
	چه‌وتان	Nallparêz
	سيامێوه‌	Nallparêz
	كۆليتان	Nallparêz
	زه‌ردۆى	Nallparêz
	زه‌نگى سه‌ر	Nallparêz
	باخى سه‌روو	Nallparêz
	ڕه‌شان	Nallparêz
	كوڕه‌مێوى سه‌روو	Nallparêz
	كوڕه‌مێوى خواروو	Nallparêz
	توتمانى خواروو	Nallparêz
	تازه‌دێ	Nallparêz
	بۆڕى ده‌رى سه‌روو	Nallparêz
	بۆڕى ده‌رى خواروو	Nallparêz
	لائاش	Nallparêz
	سلێمانه‌دۆڵ	Nallparêz
	ره‌زڵه‌	Nallparêz
	گوڵانى سه‌روو	Nallparêz
	ده‌شتى خه‌رمان	Nallparêz
	قوڵه‌گيسكان	Nallparêz
	دۆسته‌ده‌ره‌	Nallparêz
	سه‌ركان	Nallparêz
	ده‌ره‌ميانه‌	Nallparêz
	داره‌به‌ن	Nallparêz
	هه‌رزه‌له‌	Nallparêz
	ئاروزه‌ر	Nallparêz
	بادانه‌	Nallparêz
	سوێره‌	Nallparêz
	مه‌مه‌ندئاوا	Nallparêz
	زه‌ردكاوا	Nallparêz
	كانى ماران	Nallparêz

=== Ranya District ===
Ranya District consists of the five sub-districts of Ranya, Çiwarqurine, Haciawa, Bêtwate and Serkepan. Ranya is the capital of the district.

Name	Official name	Sub-district
Ranya	رانيه	Ranya
	بۆسك‌ێن	Ranya
	قوڕه‌گۆ	Ranya
	ده‌ربه‌ندی رانيه	Ranya
	تۆ‌پاوا	Ranya
	هه‌نجیره‌ رمك	Ranya
	هه‌نجیره‌ ئاكۆ	Ranya
Çiwarqurine	چوارقورنه‌	Çiwarqurine
	کوله‌ک	Çiwarqurine
	‌گردجان	Çiwarqurine
	سه‌ر خمه‌	Çiwarqurine
	قمته‌ران	Çiwarqurine
	ئستريلان	Çiwarqurine
	قه‌سرۆک	Çiwarqurine
	هيزۆ‌پى ‌گه‌وره‌	Çiwarqurine
	چنارۆكى بلباس	Çiwarqurine
	هيزۆ‌پى بچوك	Çiwarqurine
	ب‌ێستانه	Çiwarqurine
	‌ گه‌لی ‌گوڵان	Çiwarqurine
Hacîawa	حاجياوا	Haciawa
	كانى ماران	Haciawa
	‌پوکه‌ی سه‌روو	Haciawa
	‌گردى تلێ	Haciawa
	زن‌گ زن‌گه	Haciawa
	چۆڵياوا	Haciawa
	ميره به‌گ	Haciawa
	قوڕه‌ به‌رازه‌	Haciawa
	‌ پوکه‌ی خواروو	Haciawa
	‌ گه‌رمکه‌ داڵ	Haciawa
	كانى توان	Haciawa
	خه‌لیفه‌	Haciawa
Bêtwate	ب‌ێتواته	Bêtwate
	ئاند‌ێك	Bêtwate
	ئان‌گۆز	Bêtwate
	هه‌رته‌ل	Bêtwate
	نواوه	Bêtwate
	شكارته	Bêtwate
	ن‌ێوه	Bêtwate
	بێ له‌ن‌گه‌	Bêtwate
	چیوه‌ی سه‌روو	Bêtwate
	وه‌رێ	Bêtwate
	مه‌لوك	Bêtwate
	هه‌رمک	Bêtwate
	ز‌ێوه	Bêtwate
	چيوهى خواروو	Bêtwate
	سو‌ێره	Bêtwate
	ب‌ێتواته و دوواوه	Bêtwate
	بێ ك‌ێڵ	Bêtwate
	مه‌میاوا	Bêtwate
	سه‌ردۆڵ	Bêtwate
	‌گرده ش‌ێر	Bêtwate
Serkepan	سه‌رکه‌‌پکان	Serkepan
	شارست‌ێن	Serkepan
	ش‌ێبان	Serkepan
	ده‌ڵاڵان	Serkepan
	ر‌ێز‌ێنه	Serkepan
	م‌ێكوكه	Serkepan
	‌ پاشقوته‌ڵ	Serkepan
	كانى بناو	Serkepan
	‌گۆبزاوا	Serkepan
	قه‌ڵا سه‌یده‌‌	Serkepan
	سارتکه‌ی سه‌روو	Serkepan
	سارتکه‌ی خواروو	Serkepan
	د‌ێره	Serkepan
	نۆره	Serkepan
	به‌ردان‌گه‌	Serkepan
	دۆڵه‌ ڕه‌قه‌	Serkepan
	‌پڵن‌گان	Serkepan
	ناوه‌زینان	Serkepan
	‌ گۆیچکه‌لان	Serkepan
	که‌وبینی سه‌روو	Serkepan
	م‌ێد‌ێره	Serkepan
	شه‌که‌ڵه‌	Serkepan
	‌گوڵان	Serkepan
	ب‌ێرد دبى	Serkepan

=== Seyid Sadiq District ===
Seyid Sadiq District consists of the two sub-districts of Seyid Sadiq and Siruçik. Seyid Sadiq is the capital of the district.

Name	Official name	Sub-district
Seyid Sadiq	سه‌يد سادق	Seyid Sadiq
	موان	Seyid Sadiq
	قاڵيجۆ و كانى پانكه‌	Seyid Sadiq
	قوماش و سۆيله‌ميش	Seyid Sadiq
	سه‌راو و قلرخ	Seyid Sadiq
	كه‌لوڕان و شاتوان	Seyid Sadiq
	شاملو	Seyid Sadiq
	قه‌ره‌ته‌په‌	Seyid Sadiq
	گرده‌نازێ	Seyid Sadiq
	قاينه‌جه‌	Seyid Sadiq
	كانى سپيكه‌ و خانه‌ قه‌ويله‌	Seyid Sadiq
	كێله‌كه‌وه‌	Seyid Sadiq
	ئۆج ته‌بان	Seyid Sadiq
	باوه‌ كوژراو	Seyid Sadiq
	شانه‌ده‌رى	Seyid Sadiq
	سوارى	Seyid Sadiq
	گرێزه‌	Seyid Sadiq
	باڵه‌ن ته‌ران	Seyid Sadiq
	شێره‌ به‌ره‌	Seyid Sadiq
	ئۆج قوبه‌	Seyid Sadiq
	توته‌ قاج	Seyid Sadiq
	كه‌وڵۆس	Seyid Sadiq
	گڵه‌زه‌رده‌	Seyid Sadiq
	قه‌رياتاغ	Seyid Sadiq
	هۆڵه‌ سمت	Seyid Sadiq
	چواله‌ى مارف	Seyid Sadiq
	چواله‌ى ره‌سوڵ و په‌لى هێرۆ	Seyid Sadiq
Siruçik	سروچك	Siruçik
	به‌رده‌ڕه‌ش و قه‌ڵاى شجاع	Siruçik
	مايندۆڵ	Siruçik
	هۆزى خواجه‌	Siruçik
	هه‌نارو	Siruçik
	ئه‌شكه‌وتان و به‌رد به‌رد	Siruçik
	سه‌ربوره‌ و قه‌ويله‌	Siruçik
	مۆرياس	Siruçik
	ميرمام	Siruçik
	شارى كۆن	Siruçik
	زيندانه‌	Siruçik
	كۆته‌رمه‌ڕ	Siruçik
	زڵزه‌ڵه‌	Siruçik
	چناره‌	Siruçik
	باساك	Siruçik
	وه‌ندرێنه‌	Siruçik
	بيوه‌ك و سيانزار	Siruçik
	حاجى مامه‌ند	Siruçik
	په‌رخ	Siruçik
	باراو	Siruçik
	شوكێ	Siruçik
	كارژاو	Siruçik
	گێلڵه‌ره‌	Siruçik
	كه‌رمه‌ ده‌ره‌	Siruçik
	ماياوا	Siruçik
	كانى كول	Siruçik
	ده‌ره‌ته‌ت	Siruçik
	گويزه‌ كوێر	Siruçik
	داربه‌ڕووله‌	Siruçik
	سلێمانه‌ خه‌ران	Siruçik

=== Sulaymaniyah District ===
Slêmanî District consists of the four sub-districts of Slêmanî, Bekreco, Bazyan and Tancerio (Erbet). Slêmanî is the capital of the district.

Name	Official name	Sub-district
Slêmanî	سلێمانى	‌ Slêmanî
Bekreco	به‌کره‌جۆ	‌Bekreco
	قۆرخ و دوباش	Bekreco
	ئاوباره‌/ كانى گۆمه‌	Bekreco
	قلياسانى خواروو	Bekreco
	به‌كره‌جۆ	Bekreco
	جۆگه‌ي كاك ئه‌حمد	Bekreco
	كێله‌سپى	Bekreco
	كه‌نده‌كه‌وه‌	Bekreco
	كهڵه‌وانان	Bekreco
	سۆتكه‌	Bekreco
	سورگا	Bekreco
	قوله‌ره‌يسى	Bekreco
	باوه‌مرده‌ و باوه‌گيڵدى	Bekreco
	مه‌لاداود	Bekreco
	گۆپيته‌	Bekreco
	شێخ وه‌ساڵ	Bekreco
	داراغا	Bekreco
	جێشانه‌	Bekreco
	هه‌زارمێرد	Bekreco
	كانى سپيكه‌ى گڵه‌زه‌رده‌	Bekreco
	ئالياوا	Bekreco
	له‌نجاوا	Bekreco
	قازان	Bekreco
	داودبڵاخ	Bekreco
	ته‌په‌ڕه‌ش و كانى جنه‌	Bekreco
	دارتووى مه‌ولانه‌	Bekreco
	كهڵه‌كن	Bekreco
	خێوه‌ته‌	Bekreco
	كانى به‌ردينه‌	Bekreco
	گڵه‌زه‌رده‌	Bekreco
	كانى مه‌ندم	Bekreco
	قه‌مه‌رتلى	Bekreco
	فه‌ياڵ	Bekreco
	جۆگه‌ى گه‌وره‌	Bekreco
	كانى گۆران	Bekreco
	درۆزنه‌	Bekreco
	چه‌قژ	Bekreco
	قزله‌ر	Bekreco
	هه‌نارانى خواروو	Bekreco
	هه‌نارانى سه‌روو	Bekreco
	پيركه‌	Bekreco
	قوڵقوڵه‌	Bekreco
	چاڵگه‌	Bekreco
Bazyan	بازيان	Bazyan
	بى بى جه‌ك گوران	Bazyan
	كڵاش كه‌ران	Bazyan
	سڵيمانه‌ گرده‌	Bazyan
	ئهڵايي	Bazyan
	كۆيك	Bazyan
	ته‌په‌ شوان كاره‌	Bazyan
	قوشقايه‌	Bazyan
	كانى شايه‌	Bazyan
	دارى كه‌لى	Bazyan
	ده‌رگه‌زێن	Bazyan
	باڵاجو	Bazyan
	شێخ مه‌ند	Bazyan
	ده‌ربه‌ند سوتاو	Bazyan
	له‌تيف ئاوا	Bazyan
	هاڵه‌/ محمودي	Bazyan
	ورمزيار	Bazyan
	گاوانى	Bazyan
	به‌رانان	Bazyan
	باڕۆيى گه‌وره‌	Bazyan
	ئالى بزاو	Bazyan
	باڕۆيى بچوك	Bazyan
	به‌گه‌ جانى	Bazyan
	ساتيار	Bazyan
	چۆلمَك	Bazyan
	كانى شه‌يتان	Bazyan
	باريكه‌	Bazyan
	الله قولى	Bazyan
	لازيان	Bazyan
	سه‌رچاوه‌	Bazyan
	كوپهڵه‌	Bazyan
	خێوه‌ته‌	Bazyan
	هه‌نجيره‌	Bazyan
	ئاڵى گوران	Bazyan
	مورتكه‌	Bazyan
	گومه‌ته‌كه‌چ	Bazyan
	ئاڵو بڵاخ	Bazyan
	باڵوڵان	Bazyan
	ابراهيم ئاوا	Bazyan
	خاڵدان	Bazyan
	بى بى جه‌ك وه‌يس	Bazyan
	هه‌ياسي	Bazyan
Tancerio (Erbet)	(تانجه‌رۆ (عه‌ربه‌ت	Tancerio (Erbet)
	وێڵه‌ده‌ر	Tancerio (Erbet)
	قڕگه‌	Tancerio (Erbet)
	هوانه‌	Tancerio (Erbet)
	قه‌ره‌ توغان	Tancerio (Erbet)
	ژاڵه‌ى سه‌روو و خواروو	Tancerio (Erbet)
	شێخ وه‌يساوا	Tancerio (Erbet)
	كۆڵه‌بى	Tancerio (Erbet)
	رازيانه‌	Tancerio (Erbet)
	قازاو و زيرينجو	Tancerio (Erbet)
	داربه‌ڕووله‌	Tancerio (Erbet)
	گۆزه‌ڕه‌قه‌	Tancerio (Erbet)
	ده‌مركان	Tancerio (Erbet)
	خه‌راجيان	Tancerio (Erbet)
	يه‌كماڵه‌	Tancerio (Erbet)
	باريكه‌	Tancerio (Erbet)
	به‌رده‌كه‌ڕ	Tancerio (Erbet)
	چه‌قڵاوا	Tancerio (Erbet)
	سه‌د و بيست	Tancerio (Erbet)
	قه‌ڕاڵى	Tancerio (Erbet)
	بێستان سور	Tancerio (Erbet)
	نيسكه‌جۆ	Tancerio (Erbet)
	خاك و خۆڵ	Tancerio (Erbet)
	زه‌رگوێز	Tancerio (Erbet)
	زه‌رگوێزه‌له‌	Tancerio (Erbet)
	سه‌ماوات	Tancerio (Erbet)
	يه‌خى ماڵى	Tancerio (Erbet)
	ناوگردان	Tancerio (Erbet)
	كانى شاسوار	Tancerio (Erbet)
	چه‌ناخچيان	Tancerio (Erbet)
	خراپه‌	Tancerio (Erbet)
	هه‌نجيره‌	Tancerio (Erbet)
	نه‌مهڵ	Tancerio (Erbet)
	قسره‌تى سه‌روو و خواروو	Tancerio (Erbet)
	شێخ عومه‌ر	Tancerio (Erbet)
	كه‌ماڵانى سه‌روو و خواروو	Tancerio (Erbet)
	كه‌دان	Tancerio (Erbet)
	باده‌ره‌	Tancerio (Erbet)
	چوارتاق	Tancerio (Erbet)
	باخچه‌	Tancerio (Erbet)
	شه‌مه‌	Tancerio (Erbet)
	ده‌ربند فه‌قه‌ره‌	Tancerio (Erbet)
	ويله‌كه‌	Tancerio (Erbet)
	بوشين	Tancerio (Erbet)
	كهڵباخ	Tancerio (Erbet)

=== Şarbajêr District ===
Şarbajêr District consists of the five sub-districts of Çiwarta, Siyweyl, Sîtek, Zelan and Gapîlon. Şarbajêr is the capital of the district.

Name	Official name	Sub-district
Şarbajêr	شارباژير	Çiwarta
Kenarwê	که‌ناروێ	Çiwarta
Çiwarta	چوارتا	Çiwarta
	سه‌رسير	Çiwarta
	شه‌مساوا	Çiwarta
	قه‌ڵاچواڵان	Çiwarta
	سامان	Çiwarta
	خمانه‌	Çiwarta
	گه‌نكێ	Çiwarta
	چناره‌ي چوارتا	Çiwarta
	مێكوكان	Çiwarta
	بناويله‌ي چوارتا	Çiwarta
	سنجه‌ڵێ	Çiwarta
	خێوه‌ته‌	Çiwarta
	واژه‌	Çiwarta
	به‌رده‌زه‌رد	Çiwarta
	كيسه‌ڵاوا	Çiwarta
	دڕه‌ڵه‌ي حاجي	Çiwarta
	كه‌ناروێ	Çiwarta
	دێگه‌ڵ	Çiwarta
	گرده‌زبێر	Çiwarta
	وه‌ڕاز	Çiwarta
	به‌يانان	Çiwarta
Siyweyl	سيوه‌يل	Siyweyl
	كاني شوان	Siyweyl
	سێوه‌نگ	Siyweyl
	مڕانه‌	Siyweyl
	بێورێ	Siyweyl
	گۆمڵێ	Siyweyl
	ڕه‌شه‌كاني	Siyweyl
	مه‌ڵكه‌تێن	Siyweyl
	سيرێ	Siyweyl
	دێرێى خواروو	Siyweyl
	دێرێى سه‌روو	Siyweyl
	سوره‌دزه‌	Siyweyl
	سوره‌باني ئالان	Siyweyl
	مه‌روێ	Siyweyl
	بۆسكان	Siyweyl
	نه‌ڵه‌سو	Siyweyl
	سيرين	Siyweyl
	بارێي گه‌وره‌	Siyweyl
	بارێي بچوك	Siyweyl
	موسه‌ك	Siyweyl
	تيمار	Siyweyl
	شه‌هابه‌ددين	Siyweyl
	هه‌ڵوان	Siyweyl
	سياوه‌حشان	Siyweyl
	توتكان	Siyweyl
	زاخه‌	Siyweyl
	ئاشي بارام	Siyweyl
	كاني گوێز	Siyweyl
	ئاشقه‌هۆڵ	Siyweyl
	گۆرانگا	Siyweyl
	بواڵك	Siyweyl
	شيوه‌كه‌ڵ	Siyweyl
	سوره‌باني نۆڕك	Siyweyl
	نۆڕك	Siyweyl
	نۆڕه‌باب	Siyweyl
	ته‌م ته‌م	Siyweyl
	سورێ	Siyweyl
Sîtek	سيته‌ك	Sîtek
	هه‌رمن	Sîtek
	ئه‌حمه‌د ئاوا	Sîtek
	كاني سارد	Sîtek
	نۆدێ	Sîtek
	عازه‌بان	Sîtek
	بزه‌ينان	Sîtek
	وێڵه‌	Sîtek
	چنگيان	Sîtek
	خه‌مزه‌	Sîtek
	سيره‌مێرگ	Sîtek
	گه‌نكاوه‌	Sîtek
	دڕه‌ڵه‌كۆن	Sîtek
	بازه‌گير	Sîtek
	گه‌ڕه‌دێ	Sîtek
	شيراوێژه‌	Sîtek
	كاني وه‌يسه‌	Sîtek
	گورگه‌ده‌ر	Sîtek
	ئاڵه‌سياو	Sîtek
	وه‌ڵانه‌	Sîtek
	شارستێن	Sîtek
	بناويله‌ي گۆيژه‌	Sîtek
	سيته‌ك	Sîtek
	ته‌گه‌ران	Sîtek
	مۆكه‌به‌	Sîtek
	ماره‌ڕه‌ش وهۆمه‌راخ	Sîtek
	قوڵه‌ڕه‌ش	Sîtek
	قه‌يواني بچوك	Sîtek
	دۆڵه‌توو	Sîtek
Zelan	زه‌لان	Zelan
	مامه‌خه‌‌ڵان	Zelan
	بيانه‌	Zelan
	پڵنگه‌	Zelan
	ولياوا	Zelan
	چه‌مياڵه‌	Zelan
	زه‌‌ڵان	Zelan
	كه‌وانه‌دۆڵ	Zelan
	زيه‌ و كاني كوزه‌ڵه‌	Zelan
	كاني به‌ن	Zelan
	دێگه‌له‌	Zelan
	حه‌سه‌ن گورگ	Zelan
	كاني خدران	Zelan
	سه‌رخوار	Zelan
	چاڵه‌ خه‌زێنه‌	Zelan
	چۆڕك	Zelan
	چناره‌ي شێخ ئه‌لمارين	Zelan
	شێخ ئه‌لمارين	Zelan
	ره‌نگينه‌	Zelan
	چه‌مه‌ك	Zelan
	سپيداره‌	Zelan
	هه‌وڵو	Zelan
	هه‌رمێله‌	Zelan
	سوێره‌ڵه‌	Zelan
	گوڕه‌دێم	Zelan
	موبڕه‌	Zelan
	به‌وزان	Zelan
	ئاڵه‌ك	Zelan
	زێوێ	Zelan
	ناومێرگ	Zelan
	گۆماو	Zelan
	قازياوا	Zelan
	مێشولان	Zelan
	ڕه‌شك	Zelan
	پاڕه‌زان	Zelan
	گه‌ڵي	Zelan
	دۆڵ په‌مو	Zelan
	گوێزه‌ڕه‌ش	Zelan
	چناره‌ي شێخ له‌تيف	Zelan
	گاپيلۆن	Gapîlon
	گه‌وره‌دێ	Gapîlon
	كاني مێو	Gapîlon
	گه‌ڕه‌دێ	Gapîlon
	مالومه‌	Gapîlon
	چوخماخ	Gapîlon
	گاپێڵۆن	Gapîlon
	وڵاخلو	Gapîlon
	باڵخ	Gapîlon
	سه‌نگه‌ر	Gapîlon
	مێوڵاكه‌	Gapîlon
	قه‌يواني گه‌وره‌	Gapîlon
	كۆڵه‌رد	Gapîlon
	قوڵه‌جاغ	Gapîlon
	بايزاوا	Gapîlon
	كارێزه‌	Gapîlon
	كونه‌ ماسي	Gapîlon
	دۆڵ بێشك	Gapîlon

=== Şahrezûr District ===
Şahrezûr District consists of the two sub-districts of Şahrezûr and Warmawa. Şahrezûr is the capital of the district.

Name	Official name	Sub-district
Şarezûr	شاره‌زوور / هه‌ڵه‌‌بجه‌‌ی تازه‌	Şahrezûr
Warmawa	وارماوا	Warmawa
	محمودخانى	Warmawa
	مالوان	Warmawa
	حاسل و ته‌په‌كه‌ل	Warmawa
	كاني ڕه‌ش	Warmawa
	يه‌خشى	Warmawa
	جبوغ	Warmawa
	ئالان	Warmawa
	سارتكه‌	Warmawa
	قه‌ڵبه‌زه‌	Warmawa
	بێسه‌لمێن/ كانى به‌ردينه‌	Warmawa
	تووه‌ قوت	Warmawa
	قليجه‌/ جه‌ردانسه‌	Warmawa
	ده‌ق	Warmawa
	قه‌ره‌ گۆل	Warmawa
	قليجه‌	Warmawa
	ميره‌دى	Warmawa
	كوله‌بى	Warmawa
	زه‌له‌ڕه‌ش	Warmawa
	بيده‌ن	Warmawa
	نه‌مه‌ڵ	Warmawa
	دسكه‌ره‌	Warmawa
	خه‌رجانه‌	Warmawa
	جولانه‌	Warmawa
	كانى ههمزه‌	Warmawa
	احمد ئاوا	Warmawa
	سيته‌لانى سه‌روو و خواروو	Warmawa
	î	Warmawa
	كانى ههنجير	Warmawa
	كانى توو	Warmawa
	ئاوه‌كه‌ڵه‌	Warmawa

=== Xaneqîn District ===
Xaneqîn District consists of the three sub-districts of Meydan, Bemo and Qorietû. Meydan is the capital of the district.

Name	Official name	Sub-district
Meydan	مەيدان	Meydan
	گۆڕگنۆش	Meydan
	جەبراوە	Meydan
	زەلكە	Meydan
	خەليفە ئەحمەد	Meydan
	خوڕخوڕەي سەروو	Meydan
	خوڕخوڕەي خوراوو	Meydan
	عەلي پەكان	Meydan
	قەڕەچەم	Meydan
	ناو ماچك	Meydan
	حاجى لەرى سەروو	Meydan
	حاجى لەرى خواروو	Meydan
	كاني بۆرەكە	Meydan
	(تازەدێ (چۆڵ	Meydan
	دێ سوتك	Meydan
	چيا ڕەزا	Meydan
	باق و بەرە	Meydan
	هۆمەرمل	Meydan
	ئازادى	Meydan
	حەسار	Meydan
	كانى كرمانج	Meydan
	بێلولە	Meydan
	باخەهەنارە	Meydan
	شاوازي	Meydan
	هۆرێن	Meydan
	مێشاوا	Meydan
	كەمتەران	Meydan
	خەركەني	Meydan
	قەسڵان	Meydan
	دارئيمام	Meydan
	تۆدگه‌	Meydan
	كەو زەناڵي	Meydan
	كونە قەل	Meydan
	سۆڵاو	Meydan
	شمشيركوڵ	Meydan
	سەراو	Meydan
	ژاڵەناو	Meydan
	ئاوبارە	Meydan
	گەرمك	Meydan
	ناودێ	Meydan
	كوێرەك	Meydan
	باني بي	Meydan
	دەربەند بێلولە	Meydan
	سەرتەك	Meydan
	كاني ژاڵە	Meydan
Bemo	بەمۆ	Bemo
	پەروێنى ژوروو	Bemo
	بەلەسوو	Bemo
	چوارداراني ژوروو	Bemo
	چوارداراني خواروو (چۆڵ)	Bemo
	پشتە	Bemo
	توەووشكي	Bemo
	كاني پاشا	Bemo
	كاني ويسكە	Bemo
	(حاجى ئاوا (چۆڵ	Bemo
	گمە	Bemo
	(سعداوا (چۆڵ	Bemo
	قەڵب	Bemo
Qorietû	قۆڕەتوو	Qorietû
	موسا عوسمان	Qorietû
	(كەلايي ميرە (چۆڵ	Qorietû
	(دارەخورماي مەلا حەسەن (چۆڵ	Qorietû
	دارەخورماي محمەد سالم	Qorietû
	دارەخورماي سەيد غەريب	Qorietû
	سەوزبڵاخي گەورە	Qorietû
	سەوزبڵاخي بچوك	Qorietû
	قەڵەمە	Qorietû
	(چەم چەقەڵ (چۆڵ	Qorietû
	(گەڕەپوولە (چۆڵ	Qorietû
	دۆڵي بەگزاد	Qorietû
	حەوش كوري	Qorietû
	گەرمك قەيسەر	Qorietû
	مەركەز حدود	Qorietû
	مەركەز شێخ	Qorietû
	(هەنجيرەي كاكەيي (چۆڵ	Qorietû
	(هەنجيرەي كوێخا شامراد (چۆڵ	Qorietû
	خدري گەورە	Qorietû
	ئاوايي شێخ غەريب	Qorietû
	ئاوايي گەورە	Qorietû
	حاجي خەليل	Qorietû
	كاني ماسي	Qorietû
	(تازەشار (چۆڵ	Qorietû
	تۆپ عەسكەر	Qorietû
	پشت بەنگ	Qorietû
	شێرەوەن	Qorietû
	كاكۆڵي	Qorietû
	سياوڵەي شێخ نەجم	Qorietû
	غەيدان	Qorietû
	كاني زەرد	Qorietû
	(سياوڵەي رەشيد (چۆڵ	Qorietû
	سەيد سيخي	Qorietû
	سالح ئاغا	Qorietû
	قادر ئاغا	Qorietû
	وەلي ئاغا	Qorietû
	خەياڵ	Qorietû
	باريكە	Qorietû
	دەورە	Qorietû
	بان زەميني سەيد محمەد	Qorietû
	بان زەميني مەلا سلێمان	Qorietû
	بان زەميني سەيد كەريم	Qorietû
	سبحان ئاوا	Qorietû
	حەميد ئاوا	Qorietû
	گوڕە شەلە	Qorietû
	تازەدێي گۆڕە شەلە	Qorietû
	ئەلي خالە	Qorietû
	چواركڵاوي سەروو	Qorietû
	چواركڵاوي خواروو	Qorietû
	چواركڵاوي كوێخا	Qorietû
	مەحمود قەجەر	Qorietû
	ئەلي مير	Qorietû
	پەروێزخان	Qorietû
	مەجيد سالار	Qorietû
	عەلي ئاغا	Qorietû
	سەي كەوەن	Qorietû
	بەردە عەلي ى خواروو	Qorietû
	بەردە علي ى سەروو	Qorietû
	ڕەزوار	Qorietû
	كاني پەمو	Qorietû
	چيا سەوز	Qorietû
	كاني شيرينە	Qorietû
	(ئيدارە (چۆڵ	Qorietû
	شێخ فەيزولڵا	Qorietû
	قەڵاتەپەي سەروو	Qorietû
	قەڵاتەپەي خواروو	Qorietû
	بانە بۆر	Qorietû
	سێ خران	Qorietû
	تەنوەر	Qorietû
	سەيد مستەفا	Qorietû
	سەنگەري سەروو	Qorietû
	سەنگەري خواروو	Qorietû
	سەنگەري ناوەڕاست	Qorietû
	سەرقزڵ	Qorietû

== Notes ==
- KRSO (2009), "2009 - ناوی پاریزگا. يه که کارگيرييه كانی پاریزگاكانی هه ریمی کوردستان" [2009 - Name of the county. Administrative units of the provinces of the Kurdistan Region] (PDF), Kurdistan Region Statistics Office (KRSO) (in Kurdish), pp. 1–179, archived from the original (PDF) on 18 September 2021
