= Timeline of Zionism =

This is a partial timeline of Zionism since the start of the 16th century.

== Early modern period ==
1564
Joseph Nasi encourages Jewish settlement in Tiberias, having fled the Spanish Inquisition in 1547
1615
Thomas Brightman's Shall they return to Jerusalem again? is published posthumously.
1621
Sir Henry Finch publishes The World's Great Restauration, or Calling of the Jews, and with them of all Nations and Kingdoms of the Earth to the Faith of Christ
1643
Isaac La Peyrère, a French Protestant of Sephardic ancestry and contemporary of Menasseh Ben Israel, publishes Du rappel des juifs which prophesies the conversion of the Jews, their return to Palestine and the beginning of the Messianic Age
1649
Ebenezer and Joanna Cartwright dispatch a petition to the British Government calling for the ban on Jews settling in England to be lifted and for assistance to be provided to enable them to be repatriated to Palestine.
1670
Baruch Spinoza's Theologico-Political Treatise is the first work to consider the Jewish Question in Europe
1700
Judah he-Hasid leads some 1,500 Jewish immigrants to the Land of Israel and settles in Jerusalem. Three days after the group's arrival their leader dies (on October 17, 1700). In 1720 their synagogue was burned down and all Ashkenazi Jews were banned by the Ottomans.
1771
Joseph Eyre publishes a scholarly essay entitled Observations Upon The Prophecies Relating To The Restoration Of The Jews
1777
Menachem Mendel of Vitebsk along with a large group of followers emigrates and settles in Safed. In 1783 they were forced out of Safed, and moved to Tiberias.
1794
Richard Brothers, a millenarianist, Christian restorationist, a false prophet and the founder of British Israelism, writes A revealed knowledge of the prophecies & times, predicting the return of the Jews to Jerusalem in 1798 where they will be converted to Christianity.
1805
Foundation of the Palestine Association, stating amongst other goals that "we hope to establish relative to the history, the manners, and the country of the Jewish nation"
1808
The first group of Perushim, influenced by the teachings of the Vilna Gaon, leaves Shklov and after a 15-month journey settles in Jerusalem and Safed.
1809
Foundation of the London Society for Promoting Christianity amongst the Jews
1811
François-René de Chateaubriand, the founder of Romanticism in French literature, published Itinéraire de Paris à Jérusalem, in which he wrote of the Jews of Jerusalem as "rightful masters of Judea living as slaves and strangers in their own country"
1815
English poet Lord Byron publishes his Hebrew Melodies. The poem does not refer to a return to Palestine, but is one of the first literary works of Jewish nationalism.
1819
Wissenschaft des Judentums ("Jewish Studies") began to build a secular Jewish identity in the German Confederation
1827
John Nelson Darby's Plymouth Brethren is founded to propagate the Christian eschatological movement of dispensationalism, which teaches that God looks upon Jews as the chosen people (rejecting supersessionism), and that the nation of Israel will be born again and brought to realize they crucified their Messiah at his second coming
1821–1830
The Greek War of Independence legitimized the concept of small ethnically-based nation-states among other subject peoples of the Ottoman Empire

== After the Egyptian–Ottoman War ==
1833
Benjamin Disraeli, then 28 years old, writes The Wondrous Tale of Alroy about David Alroy's messianic mission to Jerusalem
1837
Lord Lindsay travels to Palestine. In 1838 he wrote Letters on Egypt, Edom and the Holy Land in which he stated "Many I believe entertain the idea that an actual curse rests on the soil of Palestine, and may be startled therefore at the testimony I have borne to its actual richness. Let me not be misunderstood: richly as the valleys wave with corn, and beautiful as is the general aspect of modern Palestine, vestiges of the ancient cultivation are every where visible... proofs far more than sufficient that the land still enjoys her Sabbaths, and only waits the return of her banished children, and the application of industry commensurate with her agricultural capabilities, to burst once more into universal luxuriance—all that she ever was in the days of Solomon."
1839
The General Assembly of the Church of Scotland passes an Act on the Conversion of the Jews, and sends four Church of Scotland ministers, Andrew Bonar, Robert Murray M'Cheyne, Alexander Keith and Alexander Black to Palestine. They publish the popular book Narrative of a Visit to the Holy Land; And, Mission of Inquiry to the Jews in 1842
1839
Judah Alkalai publishes his pamphlet Darhei No'am (The Pleasant Paths) advocating the restoration of the Jews in the Land of Israel as a precursor to the coming of the Messiah, followed in 1840 by Shalom Yerushalayim (The Peace of Jerusalem).
1839
Lord Shaftesbury takes out a full-page advert in The Times addressed to the Protestant monarchs of Europe and entitled "The State and the rebirth of the Jews", which included the suggestion for the Jews to return to Palestine to seize the lands of Galilee and Judea, as well as the phrase "Earth without people – people without land".
1840
Lord Shaftesbury presents a paper to British Foreign Minister Lord Palmerston calling for the 'recall of the Jews to their ancient land'.
1840 (August 11)
Lord Palmerston writes to Lord Ponsonby, British Ambassador to the Ottoman Empire: "There exists at the present time among the Jews dispersed over Europe, a strong notion that the time is approaching when their nation is to return to Palestine... It would be of manifest importance to the Sultan to encourage the Jews to return and settle in Palestine because the wealth which they would bring with them would increase the resources of the Sultan's dominions; and the Jewish people, if returning under the sanction and protection, and at the invitation of the Sultan, would be a check upon any future evil designs of Mehemet Ali (of Egypt) or his successor... I have to instruct Your Excellency strongly to re-commend (to the Turkish Government) to hold out every just encouragement to the Jews of Europe to return to Palestine."
1841
George Gawler, previously the governor of South Australia, starts to encourage Jewish settlements in the land of Israel.
1842
Nadir Baxter, of the Church Pastoral Aid Society, died in 1842 and donated £1,000 in his will, stating that it be paid "towards the political restoration of the Jews to Jerusalem and to their own land; and as I conscientiously believe also that the institution by the Anglican Church of the bishopric of Jerusalem is the actual commencement of the great and merciful work of Jehovah towards Zion". The gift was declared void in 1851 in the case of Habershon v Vardon by Sir James Lewis Knight-Bruce, Chancellor of the High Court, who stated "If it can be understood to mean any thing, it is to create a revolution in the dominions of an ally of her Majesty".
1841–42
Correspondence between Moses Montefiore, the President of the Board of Deputies of British Jews and Charles Henry Churchill, the British consul in Damascus, is seen as the first recorded plan proposed for political Zionism.
1844
Mordecai Noah publishes Discourse on the Restoration of the Jews.
1844
According to one source, the Old Yishuv Jews constitute the largest of several ethno-religious groups in Jerusalem – however estimates approximately 20 years before and 20 years after this date suggest otherwise. See Demographics of Jerusalem.
1844
Rev. Samuel Bradshaw, in his Tract for the Times, Being a Plea for the Jews calls for Parliament to allot 4 million pounds for the Restoration of Israel, with another 1 million to be collected by the Church.
1844
Pastor T. Tully Crybace convenes a committee in London for the purpose of founding a "British and Foreign Society for Promoting the Restoration of the Jewish Nation to Palestine". He urges that England secure from Turkey Palestine "from the Euphrates to the Nile, and from the Mediterranean to the Desert".
1845
George Gawler publishes "Tranquilization of Syria and the East: Observations and Practical Suggestions, in Furtherance of the Establishment of Jewish Colonies in Palestine, the Most Sober and Sensible Remedy for the Miseries of Asiatic Turkey."
1849
George Gawler accompanies Sir Moses Montefiori on a trip to Palestine, persuading him to invest in and initiate Jewish settlements in the country.
c.1850
James Finn and his wife found the "British Society for the Promotion of Jewish Agricultural Labour in the Holy Land"
1851
Correspondence between Lord Stanley, whose father became British Prime Minister the following year, and Benjamin Disraeli, who became Chancellor of the Exchequer alongside him, records Disraeli's proto-Zionist views: "He then unfolded a plan of restoring the nation to Palestine – said the country was admirably suited for them – the financiers all over Europe might help – the Porte is weak – the Turks/holders of property could be bought out – this, he said, was the object of his life...."Coningsby was merely a feeler – my views were not fully developed at that time – since then all I have written has been for one purpose. The man who should restore the Hebrew race to their country would be the Messiah – the real saviour of prophecy!" He did not add formally that he aspired to play this part, but it was evidently implied. He thought very highly of the capabilities of the country, and hinted that his chief object in acquiring power here would be to promote the return"
1852
George Gawler founds the Association for Promoting Jewish Settlement in Palestine
1853–1875
Heinrich Graetz publishes History of the Jews (Geschichte der Juden), the first academic work portraying the Jews as a historical nation. Graetz's work became more nationalistic as the volumes progressed, culminating with Volumes I and II in 1873–1875 after he had returned from a trip to Palestine.
1853
Abraham Mapu publishes Ahabat Zion, the first Hebrew novel, a romance of the time of King Hezekiah and Isaiah
1857
James Finn, the second British Consul in Jerusalem, writes to Foreign Secretary the Earl of Clarendon regarding his proposal "to persuade Jews in a large body to settle here as agriculturalists on the soil ... in partnership with the Arab peasantry"
1860
The Alliance Israélite Universelle is founded in Paris
1861
The Zion Society is formed in Frankfurt, Germany.
1861
Mishkenot Sha'ananim — first neighborhood of the New Yishuv outside the Old City of Jerusalem, built by Sir Moses Montefiore.
1862
Moses Hess writes Rome and Jerusalem. The Last National Question (text) arguing for the Jews to return to the Land of Israel, and proposes a socialist country in which the Jews would become agrarianised through a process of "redemption of the soil". His ideas later evolved into the Labor Zionism movement.
1862
Zvi Hirsch Kalischer publishes Derishat Zion, maintains that the salvation of the Jews, promised by the Prophets, can come about only by self-help. His ideas contributed to the Religious Zionism movement.
1867
Mark Twain visits Palestine as part of a tour of what westerners call the Holy Land.
1869
Twain publishes The Innocents Abroad, or The New Pilgrims' Progress documenting his observations through his travels. He indicated he observed that Palestine was primarily an uninhabited desert. His account was widely circulated and remains a controversial snap-shot of the area in the late 19th century.
1870
Mikveh Israel, the first modern Jewish agricultural school and settlement was established in the Land of Israel by Charles Netter of the Alliance Israélite Universelle.
1870–1890
The group Hovevei Zion (Lovers of Zion) sets up 30 Jewish farming communities in the Land of Israel.
1876
The English novelist George Eliot publishes the widely read novel Daniel Deronda, later cited by Henrietta Szold, Eliezer Ben-Yehuda, and Emma Lazarus as having been highly influential in their decision to become Zionists.
1878 (June)
A German-language memorandum addressed to Disraeli and Bismarck is submitted to the Congress of Berlin by an anonymous Jewish group advocating the establishment of a Jewish constitutional monarchy in Palestine. It was originally thought to have been written by Disraeli himself, but later thought to be by Judah Leib Gordon. The memorandum was not discussed at the Congress, although Bismarck called it "a crazy idea".
1878
Galician poet Naphtali Herz Imber writes a poem Tikvatenu (Our Hope), later adopted as the Zionist hymn Hatikvah.
1878
Petah Tikva is founded by Jerusalem Jews, but abandoned after difficulties. Resettled in 1882 with help from first aliyah.
1878
The first Hovevei Zion ("Lovers of Zion") groups were founded in Eastern Europe
1880
Laurence Oliphant publishes The land of Gilead, with excursions in the Lebanon which proposes a settlement under British protection while respecting Ottoman sovereignty. He proposes that the 'warlike' Bedouins be driven out, and the Palestinians be placed in reservations like the native Indians of America.
1881–1884
Pogroms in the Russian Empire kill several Jews and injure large numbers, destroy thousands of Jewish homes, and motivate hundreds of thousands of Jews to flee.
1881–1920
Over two million of the Russian Jews emigrate. Most go to the U.S., others elsewhere, some to the Land of Israel. The first group of Biluim organize in Kharkov.
1881
Eliezer ben Yehuda makes aliyah and leads efforts to revive Hebrew as a common spoken language.
1882 January 1
Leon Pinsker publishes pamphlet Autoemancipation (text) urging the Jewish people to strive for independence and national consciousness.
1882
Baron Edmond James de Rothschild begins buying land in the region of Palestine and financing Jewish agricultural settlements and industrial enterprises.
1882–1903
The First Aliyah, major wave (estimated at 25,000–35,000) of Jewish immigration to Ottoman Palestine.
1882
Rishon LeZion, Rosh Pinna, Zikhron Ya'akov are founded.
1883
Rabbi Isaac Rülf publishes Aruchas Bas-Ammi, calling for a Hebrew-speaking Jewish homeland in Palestine.
1884
Katowice Conference headed by Leon Pinsker
1890
Austrian publisher Nathan Birnbaum coins the term Zionism for Jewish nationalism in his journal Self Emancipation.
1890
The Russian Tsarist government approves the establishment of "The Society for the Support of Jewish Farmers and Artisans in Syria and Palestine", a charity organization which came to be known as "The Odessa Committee."
1891
Publication of the Blackstone Memorial petition
1894
The Dreyfus affair makes the problem of antisemitism prominent in Western Europe.
1896
After covering the trial and aftermath of Captain Dreyfus and witnessing the associated mass anti-semitic rallies in Paris, which included chants, "Death to Jews", Jewish-Austro-Hungarian journalist Theodor Herzl writes Der Judenstaat (The Jewish State) advocating the creation of a Jewish state.
1896–1904
Herzl, with the help of William Hechler, unsuccessfully approaches world leaders for assistance in the creation of a Jewish National Home but creates political legitimacy for the movement. In 1902, Herzl publishes Altneuland, which portrays a Jewish state where Jews and Arabs live together in harmony, reflecting Herzl's belief in the importance of coexistence and mutual respect between different communities.

== After the First Zionist Congress ==
1897
The First Zionist Congress in Basel, Switzerland, urges "a publicly and legally assured home in Palestine" for Jews and establishes the World Zionist Organization (WZO).
1897
The Zionist Organization of America (ZOA) is founded under the name Federation of American Zionists.
1898 January 13
The French writer Émile Zola exposed the Dreyfus affair to the general public in a famously incendiary open letter to President Félix Faure to which the French journalist and politician Georges Clemenceau affixed the headline "J'accuse!" (I accuse!). Zola's world fame and internationally respected reputation brought international attention to Dreyfus' unjust treatment.
1898
Sholom Aleichem writes a Yiddish language pamphlet Why Do the Jews Need a Land of Their Own?
1899
Henry Pereira Mendes publishes Looking Ahead: twentieth century happenings, the premise of which is that the restoration of Jewish sovereignty over historic Israel is essential to the world's peace and prosperity.
1901
Fifth Zionist Congress establishes the Jewish National Fund.
1902
Herzl publishes the novel Altneuland (The Old New Land), which takes place in Palestine.
1903–1906
More pogroms in Russian Empire. Unlike the 1881 pogroms, which focused primarily on property damage, these pogroms resulted in the deaths of at least 2,000 Jews and an even higher number of non-Jews.
1903
Uganda Proposal for settlement in East Africa splits the 6th Zionist Congress. A committee is created to look into it.
1904–1914
The Second Aliyah occurs. Approximately 40,000 Jews immigrated into Ottoman Palestine, mostly from Russia. The prime cause for the aliyah was mounting anti-Semitism in Russia and pogroms in the Pale of Settlement. Nearly half of these immigrants left Palestine by the time World War I started.
1909
Tel Aviv is founded on sand dunes near Jaffa. Young Judaea, a Zionist youth movement, is founded.
1910–1916
Antisemitic Zionist conspiracy theories regarding the Ottoman Young Turk ruling elite are fuelled within the British government through diplomatic correspondence from Gerard Lowther (British Ambassador to Constantinople) and Gilbert Clayton (Chief of British intelligence in Egypt)
1915 January
Two months after the British declaration of war against the Ottomans, Herbert Samuel presents a detailed memorandum entitled The Future of Palestine to the British Cabinet on the benefits of a British protectorate over Palestine to support Jewish immigration
1915 October – 1916 January
McMahon–Hussein Correspondence, agreeing to give Arabia to Arabs, if Arabs will fight the Turks. The Arab Revolt began in June 1916.
1916 May 16
Britain and France sign the secret Sykes–Picot Agreement which details the proposed division of Arabia at the conclusion of World War I into French and British spheres of influence.
1917 August
The formation of the Jewish Legion (Zion Mule Corps), initiated in 1914 by Joseph Trumpeldor and Zeev Jabotinsky.
1917
T. E. Lawrence leads Arab militias to defeat various Turkish Garrisons in Arabia.
1917 November 2
The British Government issues the Balfour Declaration which documented three main ideas:

- First, it declared official support from the British Government for "the establishment in Palestine of a national home for the Jewish people", and promised that the British Government would actively aid in these efforts.
- Second, it documented that the British Government would not support actions that would prejudice the civil and religious rights of the existing non-Jewish residents of Palestine.
- Finally, it confirmed that Jews living in any other country would, similarly, not be prejudiced.

== After the Balfour Declaration ==
1917 November 23
Bolsheviks release the full text of the previously secret Sykes-Picot Agreement in Izvestia and Pravda; it is subsequently printed in the Manchester Guardian on November 26.
1917 December
The British Army gains control of Palestine with military occupation, as the Ottoman Empire collapses in World War I.
1918–1920
Massive pogroms accompanied the Russian Revolution of 1917 (the Russian Civil War), resulting in the death of an estimated 70,000 to 250,000 civilian Jews throughout the former Russian Empire; the number of Jewish orphans exceeded 300,000.
1919–1923
The Third Aliyah was triggered by the October Revolution in Russia, the ensuing pogroms there and in Poland and Hungary, the British conquest of Palestine and the Balfour Declaration. Approximately 40,000 Jews arrived in Palestine during this time.
1920
The San Remo conference of the Allied Supreme Council in Italy resulted in an agreement that a Mandate for Palestine to Great Britain would be reviewed and then issued by the League of Nations. The mandate would contain similar content to the Balfour Declaration, which indicates that Palestine will be a homeland for Jews, and that the existing non-Jews would not have their rights infringed. In anticipation of this forthcoming mandate, the British military occupation shifts to a civil rule.
1920
Histadrut, Haganah, Vaad Leumi are founded.
1921
Chaim Weizmann becomes new President of the WZO at the 12th Zionist Congress (the first since World War I).
1921
Britain grants autonomy to Transjordan under Crown Prince Abdullah.
1922 July
The offer of a Mandate for Palestine to Great Britain from the San Remo conference is confirmed by the League of Nations.
1923 September
Mandate for Palestine to Great Britain comes into effect.
1923
Britain cedes the Golan Heights to the French Mandate of Syria.
1923
Jabotinsky establishes the revisionist party Hatzohar and its youth movement, Betar.
1924
Palestine Jewish Colonization Association established by Edmond James de Rothschild
1924–1928
The Fourth Aliyah was a direct result of the economic crisis and anti-Jewish policies in Poland, along with the introduction of stiff immigration quotas by the United States. The Fourth Aliyah brought 82,000 Jews to British Mandatory Palestine, of whom 23,000 left.
1927
The Zionist Federation of Australia is established in Melbourne.
1932–1939
The Fifth Aliyah was primarily a result of the Nazi accession to power in Germany (1933) and later throughout Europe. Persecution and the Jews' worsening situation caused immigration from Germany to increase and from Eastern Europe to continue. Nearly 250,000 Jews arrived in British Mandatory Palestine during the Fifth Aliyah (20,000 of them left later). From this time on, the practice of "numbering" the waves of immigration was discontinued.
1933
Assassination of Haim Arlosoroff, a left-wing Zionist leader, thought to have been killed by right-wing Zionists
1933–1948
Aliyah Bet: Jewish refugees flee Germany because of persecution under the Nazi government with many turned away as illegal because of the British-imposed immigration limit.
1937
The British propose a partition between Jewish and Arab areas. It is rejected by both parties.
1936–1939
Great Uprising by Arabs against British rule and Jewish immigration.
1939
The British government issues the White Paper of 1939, which sets a limit of 75,000 on Jewish immigration to Palestine for the next five years and increases Zionist opposition to British rule.
1942 May
The Biltmore Conference makes a fundamental departure from traditional Zionist policy and demands "that Palestine be established as a Jewish Commonwealth" (state), rather than a "homeland." This sets the ultimate aim of the movement.
1944
The One Million Plan becomes official Zionist policy
1947 November 29
The United Nations approves partition of Palestine into Jewish and Arab states. It is accepted by the Jews, but rejected by the Arab leaders (See ).
1947 November 30
The 1947–1948 Civil War in Mandatory Palestine starts between Jewish forces, centered around the Haganah and Palestinians supported by the Arab Liberation Army.
1948 May 14
Declaration of the Establishment of the State of Israel

== After the Declaration of Israel ==
1948 May 15
Five neighboring Arab countries invade, and the 1948 Arab–Israeli war ensues.
1949 January 7
The 1948 Arab–Israeli war ends.
1956 October 29 – 1956 November 7
Suez Crisis between Egypt on one side, and Britain, France and Israel on the other.
1967 June 5 – 1967 June 10
Six-Day War with Egypt, Jordan and Syria, assisted by forces from Iraq, Saudi Arabia, Morocco, Algeria, Libya, Tunisia, Sudan and the Palestine Liberation Organization against Israel.
1967 July – 1970 August 7
War of Attrition between Egypt and Israel.
1973 October 4 – 1973 October 25
Yom Kippur War with Egypt, Syria, Jordan and Iraq against Israel.
1975
The United Nations General Assembly Resolution 3379 equates Zionism with racism.
1979 March 26
Egypt–Israel peace treaty is signed by Egyptian President Anwar El Sadat and Israeli Prime Minister Menachem Begin.
1982 June – 1982 September
1982 Lebanon War with Syria and Lebanon against Israel.
1991
The UN GA resolution 3379 is revoked by Resolution 4686.
1993 August 20
The Oslo Accords are signed by Mahmoud Abbas of the Palestine Liberation Organization, Israeli Foreign Minister Shimon Peres, U.S. Secretary of State Warren Christopher and Russian Foreign Minister Andrei Kozyrev.
1994 October 26
Israel–Jordan peace treaty is signed by King Hussein I of Jordan and Israeli Prime Minister Yitzhak Rabin.
1995 November 4
Israeli Prime Minister Yitzhak Rabin is assassinated.
2006 July 12 — 2006 August 14
2006 Lebanon War between Lebanon and Israel.

== See also ==
- History of Israel
- Timeline of Jewish history
- Timeline of Israeli history
- Anti-Zionism

== Sources ==
- Resources > Timelines The Jewish History Resource Center, Project of the Dinur Center for Research in Jewish History, The Hebrew University of Jerusalem
- A Timeline of Zionism, Modern Israel and the Conflict
