= Alroy =

Alroy may refer to:

- David Alroy (fl. 1160), a Jewish pseudo-Messiah born at Amadia in Iraq
- John Alroy (born 1966), American paleobiologist
- Alroy Jovi (born 1987), Indian animator
- Alroy (Disraeli novel), a 1833 novel by Benjamin Disraeli
