= Salam Ibrahim =

Iraqi writer

- Born: August 12, 1954 (age 71)
- Awards: Katara Prize for Arabic Fiction

Salam Ibrahim (Arabic: سلام إبراهيم ) is an Iraqi writer, born on August 12, 1954, in Diwaniyah, Iraq.

== Life ==
- Contributed in political and literary activities, as he joined at an early stage the first Marxist circles in the city, which was secretly formed by Fahd, founder of the Iraqi Communist Party. He was arrested several times and sentenced for a year after Fahd was executed in 1949.
- Arrested and tortured in psychological and physical ways more than four times from 1970 to 1980.
- Appointed as a backup soldier in the war fronts with Iran.
- Joined the revolutionaries ranks in Kurdistan in August 1982.
- In February 1983 he infiltrated the cities and disappeared until October 1983.
- Joined his military unit after he was desperate- benefiting from a general amnesty - to remain in the southern Basra front until February 1985.
- On his second joining of the mountain rebels he brought his wife with him leaving his eldest son.
- His lung functions were damaged by 60% as a result of the bombing with chemical weapons on the headquarters of the resistance parties in Zawa, behind the city of Amadiyah in 1987.
- In the Anfal campaign of August 1988, he emigrated with the groups of Kurds to Turkey and then Iran to stay in refugees camps in the far north of Iran, then Syria and Moscow.
- In 1992 he emigrated to Denmark, and he still resides there. Although he resides in Denmark.

== Career ==
- Started writing short stories in the early seventies.
- Published his first short story in the Iraqi Brotherhood newspaper, December 1975.
- Wrote more than fifty short stories from that date until 1994.
- Republished again in 1987 in Iraqi and Arabic newspapers and magazines: New culture, Eyes, The Replacement, The London Arabic Jerusalem, London life, The Ambassador, Literary Alienation, The Time, Iraqi opposition newspapers, The Beirut Noon, The Egyptian Creation, The Obelisk, The Slab, Good Morning Lebanese, Egyptian literary news, Iraqi morning, Iraqi new morning and other newspapers and magazines.
- The published material is divided between fictional text and critical text.
- On August 25, 2018, he announced his withdrawal from the Iraqi Writers Union, describing it as "wretched" against the background of his invitation in a symposium in the Union of Writers and in many interviews published in the Iraqi press about the need to connect and unify knowledge of the Iraqi text written in exile, he is still writing through Printing a series under the name of the Iraqi exile literature, but it did not find enough attention in cultural institutions such as the Ministry of Culture and the House of Cultural Affairs.

== Bibliography ==
=== Novels ===
- A Vision of the Absent, 1996. (original title: Roayah Al Gha'eb)
- Irsi, 2008. (original title: Al Ersi)
- Life is a Moment, 2010. (original title: Al Hayah Lahtha'a)
- In the deep of hell, 2013. (original title: Fee Baten Al Jaheem)
- In the deep of hell, translated into English by Pure house- United States of America 2014. (original title: Fee Baten Al Jaheem)
- Heavy Life, 2015. (original title: Hayah Thaqeelah)
- The Execution of a painter, 2016. (original title: Eda'am Rasam)
- "Don't Speak", novel, the writer published chapters of it in the Arab press. ( Don't Espeak)

=== Short stories ===
- The Vision of Certainty (collection of short stories), 1994. (original title: Roayah Al Yaqeen)
- Bed of Sand (Stories), 2000. (original title: Sareer Al Raml)
- Two Lost Children (collection of short stories) 2019. (original title: Teflan tha'aen)

== Awards and honors ==
- Nominated for the Katara Prize for Arabic Fiction 2021.
- He refused a shield and honor from the Vice-President of the Diwaniyah Governorate Council in 2013, saying: "I will get honored when you provide services to the people of my city!"
