= List of Jewish messiah claimants =

Messiah means anointed one; it included Jewish priests, prophets and kings such as David and Cyrus the Great. Later, especially after the failure of the Hasmonean Kingdom (37 BCE) and the Jewish–Roman wars (66–135 CE), the figure of the Jewish Messiah was one who would deliver the Jews from oppression and usher in an Olam HaBa ("world to come"), the Messianic Age.

Some people were looking forward to a military leader who would defeat the Seleucid or Roman enemies and establish an independent Jewish kingdom. Others, like the author of the Psalms of Solomon, stated that the Messiah was a charismatic teacher who would give the correct interpretation of Mosaic law, restore the monarchy of Israel, and judge mankind.

This is a list of notable people who have been said to be the Messiah ben David, either by themselves or by their followers. The list is divided into categories, which are sorted according to date of birth (where known).

== 1st century ==
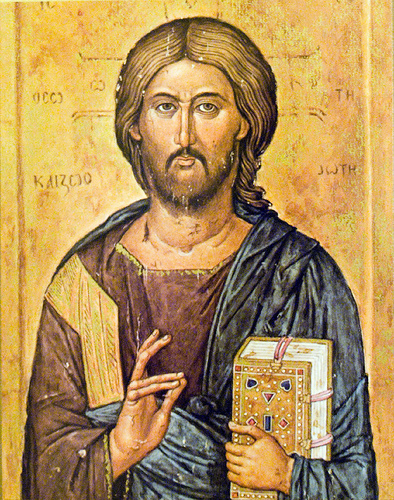
- Icon of Jesus from Macedonia, 14th century
  Jesus of Nazareth (ca. 4 BC–30/33 CE), in Galilee and the Roman province of Judaea. Jews who believed him to be the Messiah were the first Christians, also known as Jewish Christians. As of 2015, it is estimated that there are 2.3 billion Christians in the world, making Jesus of Nazareth the most widely followed and most famous Jewish Messiah claimant in human history. Aside from Christians, Muslims also believe that Jesus was the Jewish Messiah but not the Son of God. Aside from the New Testament, Jesus of Nazareth is mentioned by Josephus in the Antiquities of the Jews and by Tacitus in his Annals.
- Several Jewish rebels and military leaders lived in the 1st century, including Judas of Galilee, Theudas, Simon of Peraea, and Athronges, all of whom are only documented by Josephus in surviving accounts. None of them was explicitly stated to have been thought of as a Messiah but some scholars make this as an inference.

== 2nd century ==
With the destruction of the Temple in Jerusalem, the appearance of Messiah claimants ceased for a time. Sixty years later, a politico-messianic movement of large proportions took place.

- Simon bar Kokhba (also known as Bar Kosiba) (?– died c. 135), led a revolt against the Roman Empire in 132–135 CE. Bar Kokhba was hailed as Messiah-King by Rabbi Akiva, who referred to him using Numbers 24:17: "There shall come forth a star out of Jacob, and a sceptre shall rise out of Israel, and shall smite through the corners of Moab," and Haggai 2:21–22: "I will shake the heavens and the earth and I will overthrow the thrones of kingdoms...." (Babylonian Talmud Sanhedrin 97b). Some doubted his messiahship, but Bar Kokhba led a rebellion and founded a short-lived Jewish state. He was killed in the siege of Betar, which was the final battle of the Roman reclamation that devastated Judea.

== 5th century ==
- Moses of Crete: The failed Bar Kokhba revolt halted Jewish messianic movements temporarily but hopes for a messiah remained. Per computations found in the Talmud, the Messiah was expected to appear in the years 440 (Sanhedrin 97b) or 471 (Avodah Zarah 9b). This expectation in connection with the disturbances in the Roman Empire attendant upon invasions may have raised hopes of the Messiah. Moses of Crete appeared about this time and won over many Jews to his movement. He promised to lead the people, like the ancient Moses, dry-shod through the sea back to Israel. In about 440–470, his followers, convinced by him, left their possessions and waited for the promised day, when at his command, many cast themselves into the sea to return to Israel; many found death while others were rescued. The putative Messiah himself disappeared. Socrates of Constantinople states that Moses of Crete fled, while the Chronicle of John of Nikiû claims that he perished in the sea. While he called himself Moses, the Chronicle gives his actual name as Fiskis.

== 7th century ==
The Khuzestan Chronicle records an otherwise-unknown messianic claimant who arose alongside the Muslim conquest of Khuzestan.

== 8th century ==
The claimants that followed contributed to Jewish developments in the Orient and were involved in religious reforms that influenced Karaite Judaism. Claimants who emerged in the early part of the 8th century in Persia included:

- Abu Isa, who lived during the reign of Marwan II (744–750). Abu Isa claimed to be the last of the five forerunners of the Messiah and that God had chosen him to free Israel. Having gathered a large number of followers, he rebelled against the caliph in Persia. He was defeated and killed in Ray. His followers claimed that he was inspired, offering as their evidence that, despite being illiterate, he wrote books. Abu Isa founded a group known as the Isawiyya.
- Yudghan, called Al-Ra'i (Arabic: الراعي, lit. 'the Shepherd'), lived and taught in Persia in the first half of the 8th century. He declared himself a prophet and was regarded by his disciples as the Messiah. He came from Hamadan and taught doctrines he claimed to have received through prophecy. According to Shahristani, he denied an anthropomorphic deity, taught the doctrine of free will, and held that the Torah had an allegorical meaning in addition to its literal one. He admonished his followers to lead an ascetic life, abstain from meat and wine, and pray and fast often, per Abu Isa's instruction. He held that the observance of Shabbat and festivals was merely a matter of memorial. After his death, his followers formed a sect, the Yudghanites, who believed he had not died but would return at a future date.
- Serene (his name is given variously in the sources as Sherini, Sheria, Serenus, Zonoria, Saüra, Severus) the Syrian was born a Christian. He preached in the district of Mardin between 720 and 723. Those Christian sources dependent on Theophilus's history report that "Severus" proclaimed himself Messiah, and the Zuqnin Chronicle reports that he proclaimed himself Moses "sent again for the salvation of Israel". Serene promised "to lead [his followers] into the desert in order to introduce [them]... to the inheritance of the Promised Land which [they would] possess as before"; more akin to "prophet like Moses" than Davidic "anointed one". The immediate occasion for his appearance may have been the restriction of the liberties of the Jews by the caliph Omar II (717–720) and his proselytizing efforts. Serene had followers even in Spain, where the Jews were suffering under the oppressive taxation of the new Arab rulers they had previously welcomed, and many left their homes to follow the supposedly Moses-like prophet. His followers paid instead a tithe to Serene rather than the Muslim leadership of the emirate. Like Abu Isa and Yudghan, Serene also was a religious reformer. According to Natronai ben Nehemiah, a gaon of Pumbedita during 719–730, Serene was hostile to Rabbinic Judaism and Halakha. His followers disregarded Kashrut, rabbinically instituted prayers, and the prohibition against the "wine of libation". They worked on the second day of Jewish festivals, forewent marriage and divorce contracts instituted by Talmudic authorities, and ignored the Halakhic prohibition against marrying close relatives. Serene was arrested. Brought before Caliph Yazid II, Serene declared that he created his sect only in jest; the caliph gave Serene to the Jewish community’s authorities for punishment. Ben Nehemiah established criteria for Serene's former followers to rejoin the synagogal community, and most of them presumably agreed to follow these guidelines.

== 12th century ==
Under the influence of the Crusades the number of Jewish Messiah claimants increased, and the 12th century records many of them:

- One appeared in France (c. 1087) and was slain by the French.
- Moses ben Abraham Darʿī, a Moroccan teacher, gained a large following. He was convinced that the Messiah would free the Jews in the Almoravid countries at Passover 1127.
- David Alroy, who was born in Amadiya, appeared in Persia about 1160 declaring himself a Messiah. Taking advantage of his personal popularity, the disturbed and weakened condition of the caliphate, and the discontent of the Jews, who were burdened with a heavy poll tax, he set out upon his political schemes, asserting that he had been sent by God to free the Jews from the Muslim yoke and to lead them back to Jerusalem. For this purpose he summoned the warlike Jews of northern Persia and his coreligionists of Mosul and Baghdad to come armed to his aid and to assist in the capture of Amadia. From this point his career is enveloped in legend. His movement failed, and he is said to have been assassinated, while asleep, by his father-in-law. A heavy fine was exacted from the Jews for this uprising. Alroy had many followers in Khoy, Salmas, Tabriz, and Maragheh, and after his death, these formed a sect called the Menahemists, from the Messianic name "Menahem," assumed by their founder. Benjamin Disraeli wrote the novel Alroy based on Alroy's life.
- The Yemenite Messiah, was an anonymous alleged forerunner of the Messiah from Yemen, who appeared in Fez. The Muslims were making determined efforts to convert the Jews living there. He declared the misfortunes of the time to be prognostications of the coming Messianic kingdom, and called upon the Jews to divide their property with the poor, preaching repentance that those who gave their worldly possessions to the poor would gain a treasure in heaven. This anonymous Messiah candidate was the subject of Maimonides' Iggeret Teman. He continued his activity for a year, when he was arrested by the Muslim authorities and beheaded at his own suggestion, it is said, in order that he might prove the truth of his mission by returning to life. Nothing is known beyond the mention of him in Maimonides' "Iggeret Teman" (The Yemen Epistle).

== 13th century ==
- Abraham ben Samuel Abulafia (b. 1240–after 1291), the Kabbalist, began the series of putative Messiahs whose activity is deeply influenced by their Kabbalistic speculations. Because of his mystic studies, Abulafia came to believe first that he was a prophet; and in a prophetic book, which he published in Urbino (1279), he declared that God had spoken to him. It is thought, though not proven, that in Messina, on the island of Sicily, where he was well received, and won disciples, he declared himself the Messiah and announced 1290 as the year for the Messianic era to begin. Solomon ben Adret, who was appealed to with regard to Abulafia's claims, condemned him, and some congregations declared against him. Persecuted in Sicily, he went to the island of Comino, near Malta (c. 1288), still asserting in his writings his mission. His end is unknown. Two of his disciples, Joseph Gikatilla and Samuel, both from Medinaceli, later claimed to be prophets and miracle-workers. The latter foretold in mystic language at Ayllon in Segovia the advent of the Messiah. Abulafia gained much modern notoriety as the name for the computer of a character in Umberto Eco's novel Foucault's Pendulum.
- Nissim ben Abraham (?), another individual making claims of prophethood, active in Avila around 1295. His followers told of him that, although ignorant, he had been suddenly endowed by an angel with the power to write a mystic work, The Wonder of Wisdom, with a commentary thereon. Again an appeal was made to Solomon ben Adret, who doubted Nissim's prophetic pretension and urged careful investigation. The prophet continued his activity, nevertheless, and even fixed the last day of the fourth month, Tammuz, 1295, as the date for the Messiah's coming.

== 15th century ==
- Moses Botarel of Cisneros (?), active around 1413. After the lapse of a century another claimant came forward with Messianic pretensions. According to H. Grätz (l.c. viii. 404), identified as Moses Botarel. He claimed to be a sorcerer able to combine the names of God.

== 16th century ==
- Asher Lammlein, Asher Kay (Käei) (?), a German proclaiming himself a forerunner of the Messiah, appeared in Istria, near Venice in 1502, and announced that if the Jews would be penitent and practice charity the Messiah would come within half a year, and a pillar of cloud and of smoke would precede the Jews on their return to Jerusalem. He found believers in Italy and Germany, even among some Christians. In obedience to his preaching, people fasted and prayed and gave alms to prepare for the coming of the Messiah, so that the year came to be known as the "year of penitence." However, by the end of the year of penitence Lammlein had either died or disappeared.
- David Reubeni (1490–1541?) was an adventurer who travelled in Portugal, Italy, and Ottoman Turkey. He pretended to be the ambassador and brother of the King of Khaibar, a town and former district of Arabia, in which the descendants of the "lost tribes" of Reuben and Gad were supposed to dwell. He claimed he was sent to the Pope and the powers of Europe to secure cannon and firearms for war against the Muslims, who prevented the union of the Jews living on the two sides of the Red Sea. He denied expressly that he was a Messiah or a prophet (comp. Fuenn, Keneset Yisrael, p. 256), claiming that he was merely a warrior. The credence which he found at the papal court in 1524, the reception accorded to him in 1525 at the Portuguese court (whither he came at the invitation of John III, and where he at first received the promise of help), and the temporary cessation of persecution of the Marrano; all gave the Portuguese and Spanish Marranos reason to believe that Reuveni was a forerunner of the Messiah. Selaya, inquisitor of Badajoz, complained to the King of Portugal that a Jew who had come from the Orient (referring to Reuveni) had filled the Spanish Marranos with the hope that the Messiah would come and lead Israel from all lands back to Israel, and that he had even emboldened them to overt acts (comp. H. Grätz, l.c. ix. 532). Reuveni met Rabbi Solomon Molcho (1500–1532), a former Portuguese Marrano who had reverted to Judaism. Reuveni and Molcho were arrested in Regensburg on the orders of Charles V, Holy Roman Emperor and king of Spain. He was taken to Mantua, in Italy where, having been baptized a Catholic, he was convicted of heresy and burned at the stake in November, 1532. A spirit of expectancy was aroused by Reuveni's stay in Portugal. In Herrera del Duque, close to Puebla de Alcocer (Badajoz, Extremadura), a Jewish girl of 15 described ecstatic visions in which she spoke with the Messiah, who took her to heaven, where she saw those who had been burned seated on thrones of gold, and who assured her of his imminent return. She (known only as the Maiden of Herrera) was enthusiastically proclaimed a prophetess, and such was the commotion caused by her visions that the Toledo Inquisition had her promptly arrested.
- Solomon Molcho

== 17th century ==
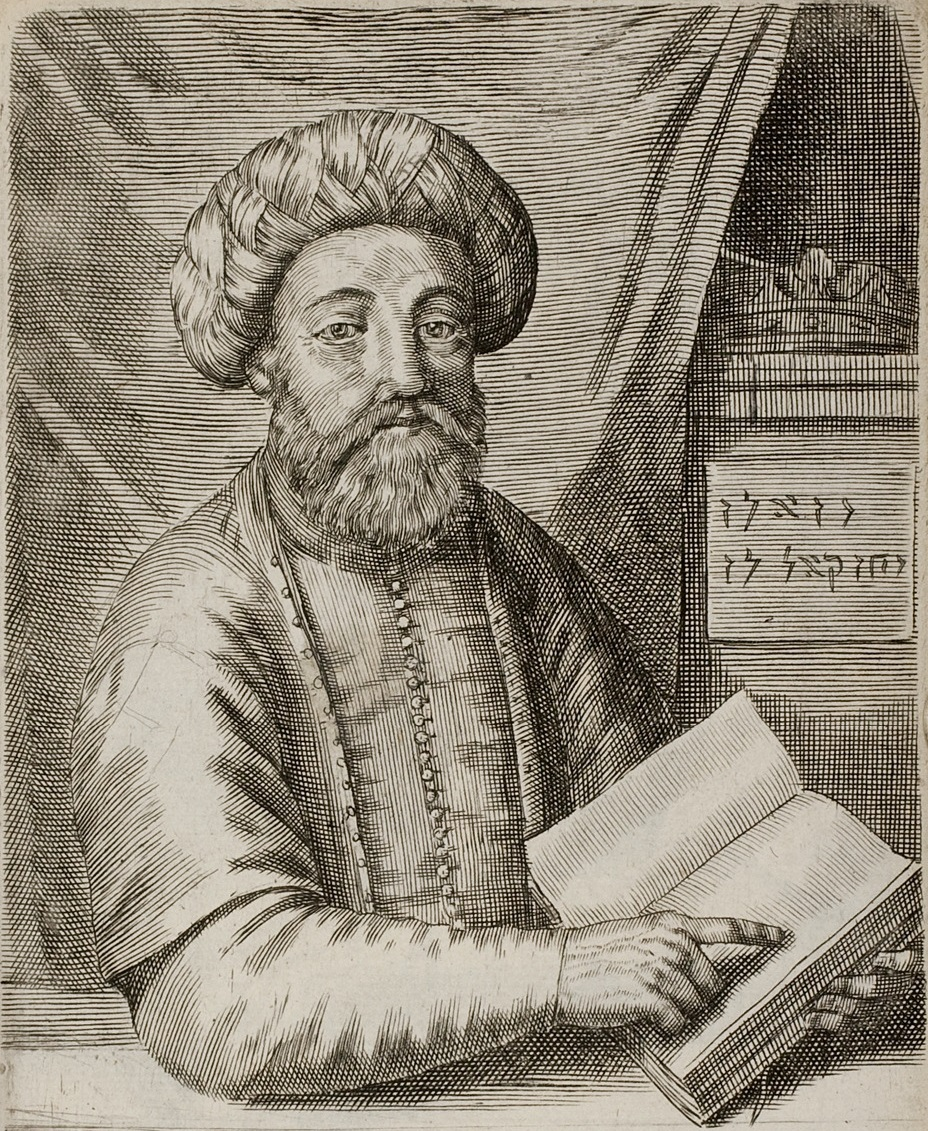
Sabbatai Zevi, 1669 depiction

- Sabbatai Zevi (1626–1676) was a Sephardic Jewish rabbi and Kabbalist who was proclaimed to be the Jewish Messiah in 1666 by Nathan of Gaza, and then forcibly converted to Islam in order to avoid the Islamic death penalty under the Ottoman sultan. He still has followers today among the Dönmeh (in Turkish: “Apostates”), who are the modern descendants of the Sabbateans, which were one of the most important messianic movements in the history of Judaism, and whose influence was widespread throughout the European and Ottoman Jewry. After his death, Sabbatai Zevi was followed by a line of putative followers who declared themselves Messiahs and are sometimes grouped as the "Sabbethaian Messiahs".
  - Barukhia Russo (1695–1740; Osman Baba), successor of Sabbatai Zevi.
  - Mordecai Mokia (1650–1729), ("the Rebuker") of Eisenstadt, another follower of Sabbatai Zevi who remained faithful to him, Mordecai Mokiaḥ ("the Rebuker") of Eisenstadt, also pretended to be a Messiah. His period of activity was from 1678 to 1682 or 1683. He preached at first that Sabbatai Zevi was the true Messiah, that his conversion was for mystic reasons necessary, that he did not die but would reveal himself within three years after his supposed death, and pointed to the persecution of the Jews in Oran (by Spain), in Austria, and in France, and to the pestilence in Germany as prognostications of his coming. He found a following among Hungarian, Moravian, and Bohemian Jews. Going a step further, he declared that he was the Davidic Messiah. Shabbethai, according to him, was only the Ephraitic Messiah and was furthermore rich, and therefore could not accomplish the redemption of Israel. He (Mordecai), being poor, was the real Messiah and at the same time the incarnation of the soul of the Ephraitic Messiah. Italian Jews heard of him and invited him to Italy. He went there about 1680, and received a warm welcome in Reggio and Modena. He spoke of Messianic preparations, which he had to make in Rome, and hinted at having perhaps to adopt Christianity outwardly. Denounced to the Inquisition, or advised to leave Italy, he returned to Bohemia, and then went to Poland, where he is said to have become insane. From his time a sect began to form there, which still existed at the beginning of the Mendelssohnian era.
  - Jacob Querido (died 1690), son of Joseph Filosof, and brother of the fourth wife of Sabbatai Zevi, became the head of the Shabbethaians in Salonica, being regarded by them as the new incarnation of Zevi himself. He pretended to be Shabbethai's son and adopted the name Jacob Tzvi. With 400 followers allegedly converted to Islam in 1687, following the forced conversion of Zevi himself, forming a sect called the Dönmeh (in Turkish: “Apostates”). He himself even made a pilgrimage to Mecca (c. 1690). After his death during the pilgrimage his son Berechiah or Berokia succeeded him (c. 1695–1740).
  - Miguel (Abraham) Cardoso (1630–1706), born of Marrano parents, may have been initiated into the Shabbethaian movement by Moses Pinheiro in Leghorn. He became a prophet of the Messiah, and when the latter embraced Islam he justified this treason, saying that it was necessary for the Messiah to be reckoned among the sinners in order to atone for Israel's idolatry. He applied Isa. liii. to Shabbethai, and sent out epistles to prove that Shabbethai was the true Messiah, and he even suffered persecution for advocating his cause. Later he considered himself as the Ephraitic Messiah, asserting that he had marks on his body, which were proof of this. He preached and wrote of the speedy coming of the Messiah, fixing different dates until his death (see Cardoso, Miguel).
  - Löbele Prossnitz (Joseph ben Jacob) (?–1750), (early 18th century). He taught that God had given dominion of the world to the "pious one," i.e., the one who had entered into the depths of Kabbalah. Such a representative of God had been Sabbatai Zevi, whose soul had passed into other "pious" men, into Jonathan Eybeschütz and into himself. Another, Isaiah Hasid (a brother-in-law of the Shabbethaian Judah Hasid), who lived in Mannheim, secretly claimed to be the resurrected Messiah, although publicly he had abjured Shabbethaian beliefs.

== 18th century ==
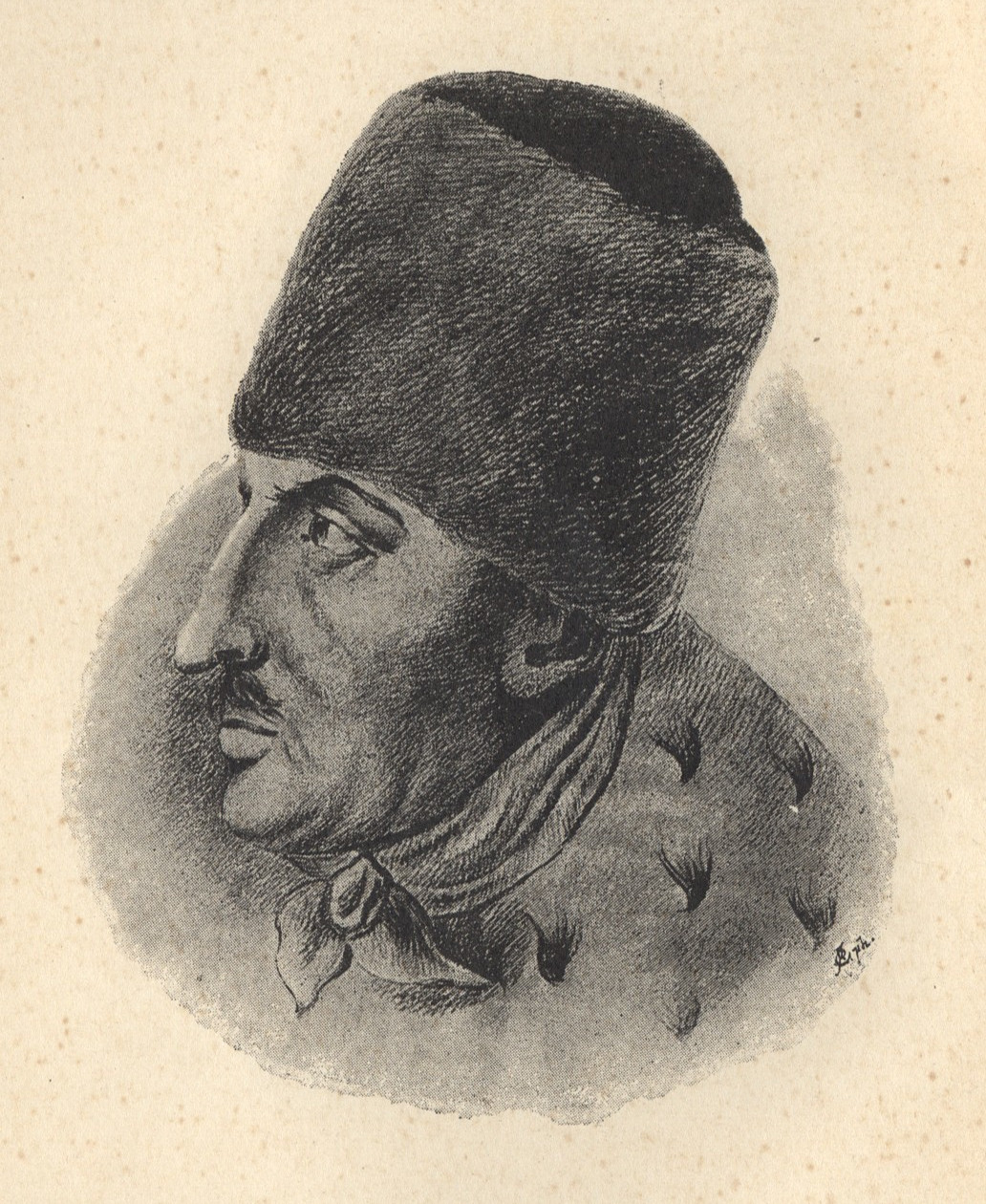
Jacob Frank, 1895 depiction

- Jacob Joseph Frank (born 1726 in Podolia; died 1791 in Offenbach am Main) was the heretic founder of the messianic antinomian Frankist movement. He made contact with the Dönmeh, secretive followers of Sabbatai Zevi, of whom he claimed to be the reincarnation. Having secured a following among some Jews in Turkey and Wallachia, in 1755 he came to Podolia, where the Sabbateans were in need of a leader, and revealed himself to them as the reincarnation of the soul of Berechiah. His followers claimed he performed miracles; and they even prayed to him. His purpose, as well as that of his sect, was to uproot rabbinic Judaism. He was forced to leave Podolia; and his followers were persecuted. Returning in 1759, he advised his followers to embrace Christianity, and about 1,000 converted and became Polish gentry of Jewish origins. He himself converted in Warsaw in November 1759. But he ran afoul of the Catholic Church and for a time was imprisoned for heresy.
- Eve Frank (1754–1816/1817), was the daughter of Jacob Frank. In 1770 Eve was declared to be the incarnation of the Shekinah, the female aspect of God, as well as the reincarnation of the Virgin Mary and thus became the object of a devotional subcult herself in Częstochowa. Historian Jerry Rabow sees her as the only woman to have been declared a Jewish messiah.

== 19th century ==
- Shukr Kuhayl I, 19th-century Yemenite Jewish Messiah claimant.
- Judah ben Shalom (Shukr Kuhayl II), 19th-century Yemenite Jewish Messiah claimant.

== 20th century ==
- Moses Guibbory (1899–1985), leader of a Jewish messianic movement in the United States.
- Menachem Mendel Schneerson (1902–1994), seventh Rebbe of Chabad Lubavitch and son-in-law of the sixth Rebbe, Yosef Yitzchak Schneersohn (1880–1950); some of his followers believed that he was the Jewish Messiah during his lifetime, and some of them continue to believe so after his death in 1994. The number of believers grew in size after his death. Some of his followers believe that Schneerson never died. While Schneerson remained cryptic about such assertions, many of his followers do believe he was the Jewish Messiah. The issue remains controversial within both the Chabad movement and the broader Jewish community.

== 21st century ==
- Avraham Haim Zagdun (1957–present), leader of the A"Z-niks cult.

== See also ==
- Judaism's view of Jesus
- List of messiah claimants
- List of people claimed to be Jesus

== Bibliography ==
- Note: For individual figures, please check the relevant entries where specified. This bibliography deals with the general concept and historical research related to Jewish messianism.
- Charles, Robert H. (2007) [1916]. The Chronicle of John, Bishop of Nikiu: Translated from Zotenberg's Ethiopic Text. Merchantville, NJ: Evolution Publishing. ISBN 9781889758879.
- Julius Greenstone: The Messianic Idea in Jewish History: Westport: Greenwood: 1972: ISBN 0-8371-2606-1
- Harris Lenowitz: Jewish Messiahs: From the Galilee to Crown Heights: New York: Oxford University Press: 1998: ISBN 0-19-511492-2
- Yehuda Liebes: Studies in Jewish Myth and Messianism: Albany: State University of New York Press: 1993: ISBN 0-7914-1194-X
- Jacob Neusner, William Scott Green and Ernest Francks (eds.) Judaisms and Their Messiahs at the Turn of the Christian Era: New York: Cambridge University Press: 1987: ISBN 0-521-34146-9
- Raphael Patai: Messiah Texts: Detroit: Wayne State University Press: 1979: ISBN 0-8143-1652-2 Also: New York: Avon: 1979:ISBN 0-380-46482-9
- Rabow, Jerry (2002). 50 Jewish messiahs: the untold life stories of 50 Jewish messiahs since Jesus and how they changed the Jewish, Christian, and Muslim worlds. Gefen Publishing House Ltd. ISBN 978-965-229-288-9.
- Jacob Schochet: Mashiach: The Principle of Mashiach in the Messianic Era in Jewish Law and Tradition: New York: SIE: 1992: ISBN 1-881400-00-X
- Gershom Scholem: The Messianic Idea in Judaism: New York: Schocken Books: 1995: 0805210431
- Robert Wolfe: Origins of the Messianic Idea: New York: JREP Print Center: 2003: ISBN 0-9642465-3-8
- Worth, Roland H. (2005-07-30). Messiahs and messianic movements through 1899. McFarland. ISBN 978-0-7864-2311-8.
