= Asher Lämmlein =

Proclaimed forerunner of the Jewish Messiah

Ascher ben Meir Lemlein Aschkenasi Reutlingen, Ascher Lemlein, or Asher Lämmlein was a Jew who appeared in Istria, near Venice, in 1502 and, encouraged by the works of Isaac Abrabanel, proclaimed himself a forerunner of the Jewish Messiah. His place of birth is unknown, but his nicknames Ashkenazi and Reutlingen indicate that he or his family originally came from Germany. Notably, Lämmlein was mentioned by James Joyce in Ulysses.

Lämmlein declared that if the Jews showed great repentance and charity, the Messiah would not fail to appear in six months. He gained a troop of adherents who spread his prophesies though Italy and Germany, and his message met with such acceptance that the year became known as the "year of penance." Existing institutions were willfully destroyed in the belief of coming redemption and a return to Jerusalem. However, Lämmlein died or suddenly disappeared, and his followers’ extravagant hopes came to an end.

Salo W. Baron suggests that disillusionment over the failed prophesies Lämmlein helped lead to the conversion of a few Jewish intellectuals to the Christian faith, including Victor von Carben and Johannes Pfefferkorn.

== See also ==
- Jewish Encyclopedia: “Lemmlein (Lämmlin), Asher” by Richard Gottheil and Isaac Broydé (1906).
- Jewish Messiah claimants
