= Great Mosque of Amedi =

Mosque in Amadiya, Kurdistan, Iraq

- جامع العمادية الكبير
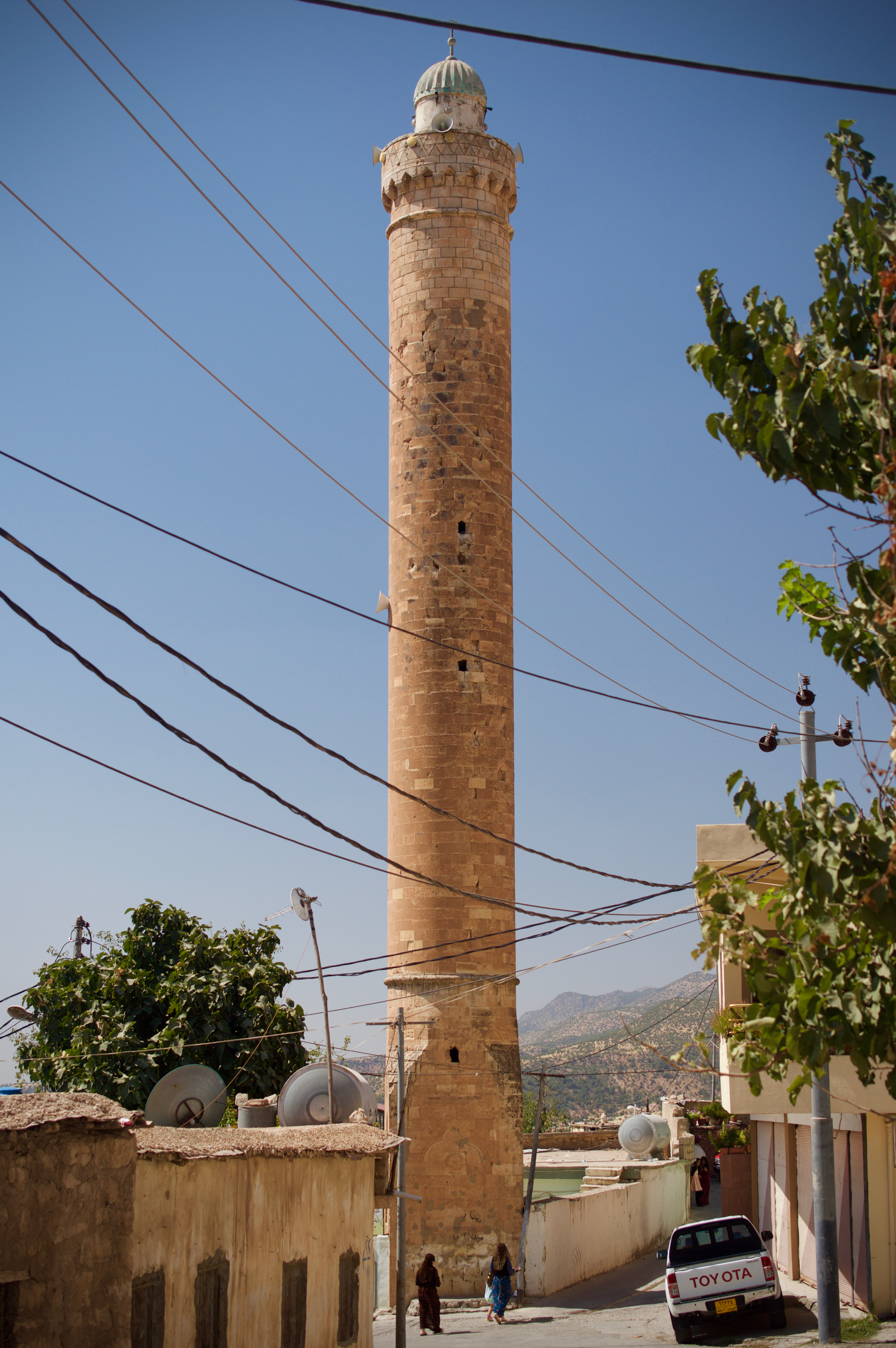
- Minaret of the Great Mosque of Amadiya

- Location of the mosque in Iraq

Religion
- Affiliation: Islam
- Ecclesiastical or organizational status: Mosque
- Status: Active

Location
- Location: Amadiya, Kurdistan Region
- Country: Iraq
- Interactive map of Great Mosque of Amedi
- Coordinates: 37°05′38″N 43°29′18″E

Architecture
- Type: Islamic architecture
- Style: Abbasid
- Completed: 1177 CE

Specifications
- Capacity: 300 worshipers
- Interior area: 2,000 m^{2} (22,000 sq ft)
- Minaret: One
- Minaret height: 30 m (98 ft)
- Materials: Stone; mud; plaster

The Great Mosque of Amêdî (Arabic: جامع العمادية الكبير Kurdish: مزگەفتی گەورەی ئامێدی), also spelled as the Great Mosque of Amadiya, is a mosque in the town of Amêdî, Kurdistan, Iraq. It was founded in 1177 CE during the Abbasid era, and has been renovated several times throughout its history.

== Description ==
The iconic minaret, which reaches 30 metres (98 ft) high, was erected during the rule of Sultan Hussein al-Wali in the 15th century CE. The minaret contains spiral staircase which reaches to the top. It is often compared with the minaret of the Great Mosque of al-Nuri in Mosul, which resembles in the construction date and certain characteristics such as square shaped foundation and cylindrical structure. During the 18th century, the dome of the minaret was damaged during a raid, and it was renovated subsequently after. In 1961, the mosque was hit by Iraqi government airstrikes which damaged the upper section of the minaret. It was later reconstructed using the original stones.

The mosque contains harem and several domes built of plasters, mud and stones. The harem is divided into two sections; an upper section built by the Sultan Hussein, and the lower section which is a prayer room for women. The mosque as a whole has an area size of 2,000 square metres (22,000 sq ft) and can accommodate up to 300 worshipers.

The mosque has a historic madrasa which once used to be the biggest educational institution in the town. The madrasa used to teach religious related materials, including Fiqh and the Arabic language. It was refurbished by the Sultan Hussein. It has a mosque in the south with an arches and dome, and library which stores works related to Fiqh.

== Gallery ==
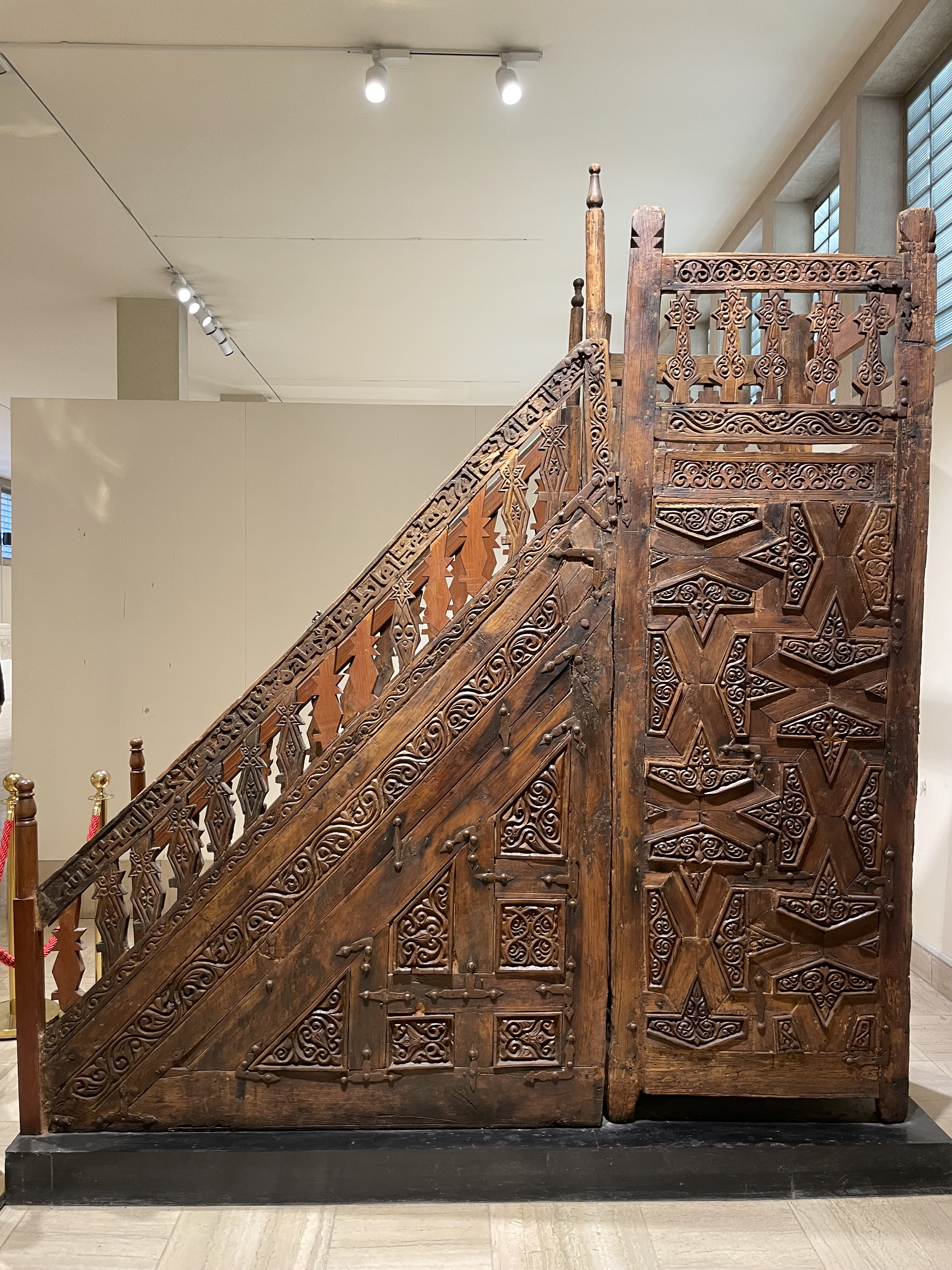
Minbar of the mosque, currently at the Iraqi National Museum

== See also ==
- Islam in Iraq
- List of mosques in Iraq
