= Tahsin Taha =

Iraqi Kurdish singer

Tahsin Muhammed Salim Taha
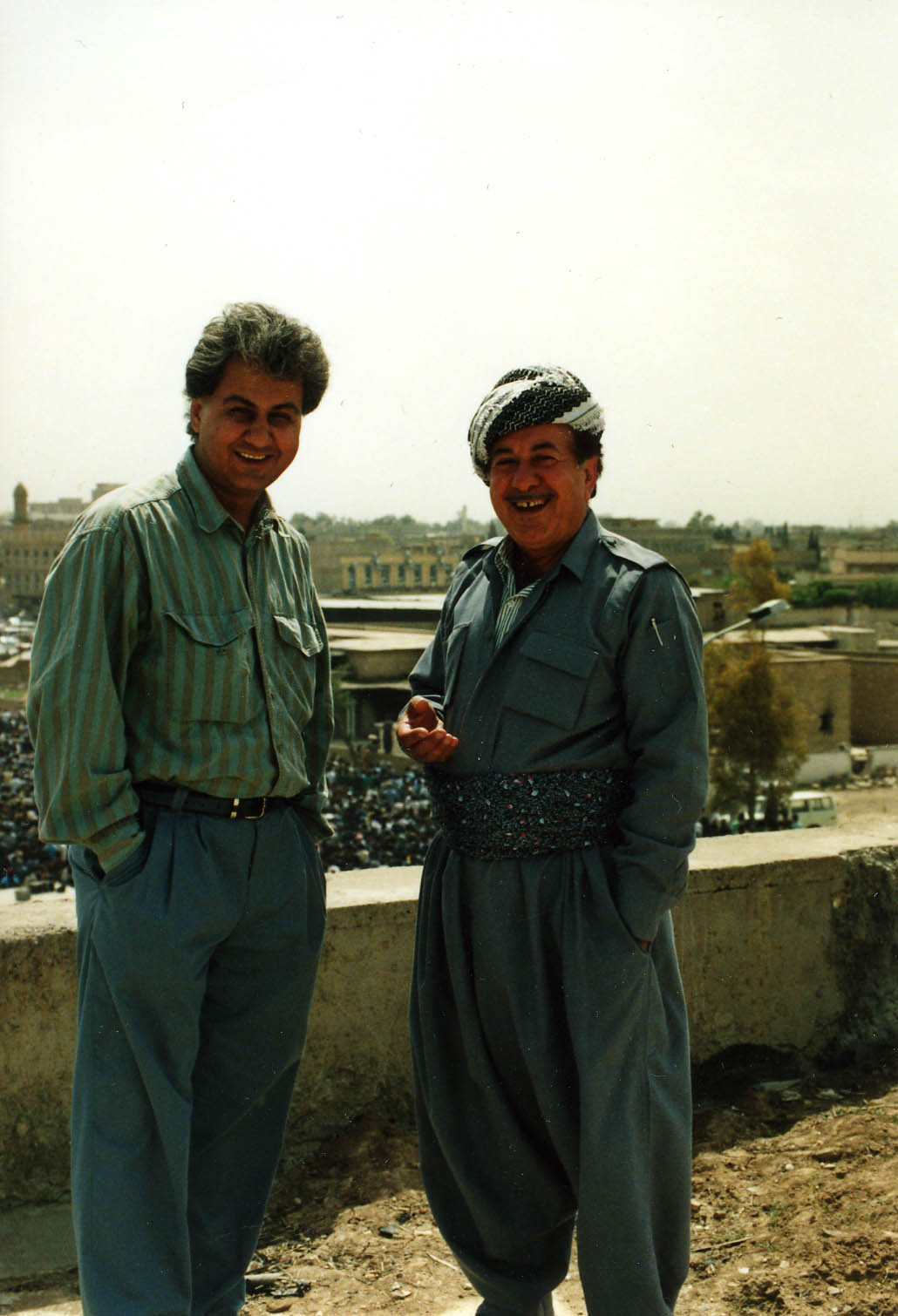
- Tahsin Taha (right) with his youngest brother Democrat Taha in The Erbil Citadel in 1991

Background information
- Born: 25 May 1941; Amadiya District, Kurdistan Region
- Died: 28 May 1995 (aged 54) Netherlands
- Genres: Kurdish music
- Occupation: Singer
- Years active: 1958–1994

Tahsin Muhammed Salim Taha (Kurdish:تەحسین محەممەد سليم تەھا) (25 May 1941 - 28 May 1995). was a Kurdish singer. Taha was born in Amadiya District in Iraqi Kurdistan. Tahsin Taha finished his school in the city of Amadiya and moved to Baghdad for higher education. Taha graduated from the Institute of Fine Arts in Baghdad in 1964. Taha registered his first song in 1958. He immigrated to the Netherlands in 1994 and died there in 1995.
