= Moses of Crete =

5th-century Jewish Messiah claimant

Moses of Crete was a Jewish Messiah claimant and apocalyptic prophet in the 5th century A.D.

After the failed Bar Kokba war, there was an end to Messianic movements for several centuries. However, the hope of a coming messiah nonetheless continued. In accordance with one interpretation of the Talmud, the Messiah was expected in 440 (Sanh. 97b) or 471 ('Ab. Zarah 9b).

This expectation in connection with the disturbances in the Roman empire attendant upon invasions may have raised hopes in a messiah claimant who appeared about this time in Crete, and who won the Jews there to his movement. He called himself Moses, and promised to lead the people, like the ancient Moses, dry-shod through the sea back to their old Holy Land of Israel and Judea. His followers, convinced of his claim, left all their possessions and waited for the promised day, upon which they followed Moses to a promontory overlooking the sea and at his command cast themselves off: many drowned or were destroyed on the rocks below.

Moses himself immediately disappeared after this event. Socrates of Constantinople states that Moses fled, while the Chronicle of John of Nikiû claims that he perished in the sea. Others claimed he had been a demon, sent to lead the Jews astray. While he called himself "Moses", the Chronicle gives his actual name as 'Fiskis'.

== See also ==
- Jewish Messiah claimants

== Sources ==
- Charles, Robert H. (2007) [1916]. The Chronicle of John, Bishop of Nikiu: Translated from Zotenberg's Ethiopic Text. Merchantville, NJ: Evolution Publishing. ISBN 9781889758879.
