= Athronges =

Jewish leader during Roman occupation of Judea

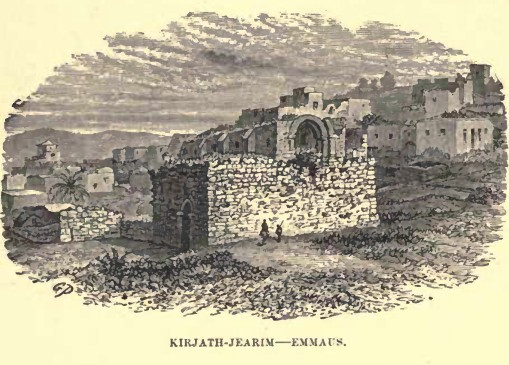
Emmaus 1886

According to Josephus, Athogod or Athrongeus (Greek: Αθρογγαίος, Athrongaíos) was a leader of the Jews during the insurrection under Herod Archelaus. Athronges led the rebellion against Archelaus and the Romans.

== History ==
Josephus wrote of him

"Athronges, a person neither eminent by the dignity he possessed. For he had been a mere shepherd, not known by anybody. But because he was a tall man, and excelled others in the strength of his hands, he was so bold as to set up for king. A thing to do more than ordinary injuries to others, that, although he risked his life, he did not much care if he lost it in so great a design.

He had four brothers, who were tall men themselves, and were believed to be superior to others in the strength of their hands, and thereby were encouraged to aim at great things, and thought that strength of theirs would support them in retaining the kingdom. Each of these ruled over a band of men of their own (for those that got together to them were very numerous). They were every one of them also commanders; but when they came to fight, they were subordinate to him, and fought for him. After he had put a diadem about his head, he assembled a council to debate about what things should be done, and all things were done according to his pleasure. So, this man retained his power a great while; he was also called king, and had nothing to hinder him from doing what he pleased.

Together with his brothers, he slew a great many of both of Roman and of the king's forces, and managed matters with the like hatred to each of them. They fell upon the king's soldiers because of the licentious conduct they had been allowed under Herod's government; and they fell upon the Romans, because of the injuries they had so lately received from them. But in process of time they grew more cruel to all sorts of men, nor could anyone escape from one or other of these seditions, since they slew some out of the hopes of gain, and others from a mere custom of slaying men.

Once, they attacked a Roman company at Emmaus, soldiers who were bringing grain and weapons to the army, and fell upon Arius, the centurion, who commanded the company, and shot forty of the best of his foot soldiers. The other Romans panicked after this slaughter, left their dead behind them, and were saved by Gratus, who came to their assistance with the king's troops that he commanded. Now these four brethren continued the war a long while by such sort of expeditions, and they much grieved the Romans; but they did their own nation also a great deal of mischief.

Afterwards they were subdued; one of them in a fight with Gratus, another with Ptolemy; Herod Archelaus took the eldest of them prisoner; while the last of them was so dejected at the other's misfortune, and saw so plainly that he had no way now left to save himself, his army being worn away with sickness and continual labors, that he also delivered himself up to Archelaus, upon his promise and oath to God to preserve his life. But these things came to pass a good while afterward."

The rebellion of Athronges against the Roman authorities may have lasted for almost two years. Josephus states how the four brothers met their fate, but he is silent on the end of Athronges himself.

== See also ==
- Jewish Messiah claimants
