= Ali Kurdi Maqtul =

Sufi shaykh and alim

Ali Kurdi Maqtul (died 1519) was a Sufi shaykh and alim who played a key-role in establishing the Sunni Naqshbandi order in the Iranian city of Qazvin during the early Safavid period.

He was born in the city of Amadiyya in Kurdistan (thus his two nisbas, Kurdi and Amadi) to a sayyid family, i.e. those who claim that they could trace their origin to the Islamic prophet Muhammad. In 1519, as a result of persecution, Ali was killed at Tabriz by Safavid authorities.

== Sources ==
- Le Gall, Dina (2011). "ʿAlī Kurdī Maqtūl". In Fleet, Kate; Krämer, Gudrun; Matringe, Denis; Nawas, John; Rowson, Everett (eds.). Encyclopaedia of Islam (3rd ed.). Brill Online. ISSN 1873-9830.
