= Moses Botarel =

Spanish scholar

Moses Botarel was a Spanish scholar who lived in the fourteenth and fifteenth centuries. He was a pupil of Jacob Sefardi (the Spaniard), who instructed him in the Kabbala.

Moses studied medicine and philosophy; the latter, he regarded as a divine science which teaches the same doctrines as the Cabala, using a different language and different terms to designate the same objects. He extolled Aristotle as a sage, applying to him the Talmudic sentence, "A wise man is better than a prophet," and he censured his contemporaries for keeping aloof from the divine teachings of philosophy. He believed in the efficacy of amulets and cameos, and declared that he was able to combine the names of God for magical purposes, so that he was generally considered a sorcerer. He stated that by means of fasting, ablution, and invocation of the names of God and of the angels prophetic dreams could be induced. He also stated that the prophet Elijah had appeared to him and appointed him as Messiah. In this role he addressed a circular letter to all the rabbis, asserting that he was able to solve all perplexities, and asking them to send all doubtful questions to him. In this letter (printed by Dukes in Orient, Lit. 1850, p. 825) Botarel refers to himself as a well-known and prominent rabbi, a saint, and the most pious of the pious. Many believed in his miracles, including the philosopher Hasdai Crescas.

Botarel was one of those who attended the disputation at Tortosa (1413–1414), and he is said to have written a polemic against Geronimo de Santa Fe. In 1409, at the request of the Christian scholar Maestro Juan, Botarel composed a commentary on the Sefer Yezirah. In the preface, he excuses himself for having revealed the divine mysteries of this work to Maestro Juan by quoting the saying of the sages that a non-Jew who studies the Torah is equal to a high priest. In his commentary, he quotes earlier cabalistic works, including some ascribed to the old authorities, such as the amora Rav Ashi. Botarel's commentary on the Sefer Yeẓirah was printed at Mantua in 1562, with the text and with other commentaries; it was republished at Zolkiev, 1745; Grodno, 1806; and Wilna, 1820.

This Moses Botarel is not Moses ben Leon Botarel, who lived at Constantinople in the 16th century and wrote the En Mishpat, containing predictions and being a free paraphrase of a Latin work of Michael Nostradamus.

== See also ==
- Jewish Messiah claimants

== Jewish Encyclopedia bibliography ==
- Adolf Jellinek, Biographische Skizzen, in Orient, Lit. 1846, pp. 187–189;
- N. Brüll, in Ha-Maggid, 1878, pp. 198–199;
- Heinrich Graetz, Geschichte viii. 98;
- idem, in Monatsschrift, 1879, pp. 78–83;
- Steinschneider, Jewish Literature, pp. 110, 128;
- idem, Cat. Bodl. cols. 1780-1783.
