= Sayf ad-Din Mashtub =

Kurdish Emir of the Ayyubid Sultanate

- Emir

Emir of Lebanon
- Reign: 1187-1192
- Predecessor: Crusader states

Emir of Nablus and as-Sāmira
- Reign: 1192-6 November 1192
- Successor: Imad al-Din Ahmad
- Born: Asip, Emirate of Hakkari
- Died: 1192; Nablus, Ayyubid Sultanate
- Issue: Imad al-Din Ahmad
Names
- Sayf ad-Din Ali Al-Mashtub ibn Ahmed ibn Abu'l-Hayja ibn Abdullah ibn Abu Khalil ibn Marzuban Al-Hakkari
- Dynasty: Hakkari
- Father: Ahmad Hakkari
Sayf ad-Din Mashtub
- Military career
- Allegiance: Zengids; Ayyubids
- Rank: sepahsalar
- Unit: Hakkariyya
- Conflicts: Third Crusade; Siege of Acre

Sayf ad-Din ʿAlī al-Mashtub al-Hakkārī (Arabic: سيف الدين علي المشطوب الهكاري; c. 1130s – 6 November 1192 CE) was a Kurdish emir and one of the leading generals in Saladin's army. Born into the Hakkārī Kurdish princely family, he rose through the ranks under Nūr ad-Dīn Zangī and later served the Ayyubid state.

Distinguished by a facial scar from battle hence the epithet al-Mashtub “the slashed” or "Scarred" (“le Balafre” of the European chronicles), he commanded Hakkārī troops loyal to Saladin and was known among his contemporaries as “King of the Kurds.” Al-Mashtub took part in the three Zangid campaigns to Egypt, helped secure the transition of power to Saladin, and became one of his most trusted strategists. He played crucial roles in the defense of Ḥamāh, the suppression of Crusader incursions, and the conquest of Jerusalem (1187). For his service, he was granted the fiefdom of Sidon and Beirut. During the Third Crusade, he fought at Acre and endured its long siege, showing exceptional bravery until his capture in 1191. He was able to escape his captivity and was rewarded by Saladin with the fiefdom of Nablus before dying in 1192 CE. Contemporary and later chroniclers praised him as one of the bravest and most loyal of Saladin's Kurdish commanders.

== Early life ==
Sayf ad-Din ʿAlī al-Mashtub belonged to the Hakkārī Kurds, a prominent Kurdish tribal confederation that inhabited the Zozān Highland. His lineage traces to the royal Hakkārī family, which controlled fortified strongholds such as Āshb (Asp; modern day Amedi) and Nūshī (Nusi), and exercised an independent rule over parts of the mountainous territory between Mosul and Lake Van. His father, Aḥmad ibn Abī al-Hayjāʾ al-Hakkārī, was a local Kurdish ruler whose father, Abu'l-Hayja, pledged allegiance to ʿImād ad-Dīn Zangī in 1133, securing his family's position within the Mosul Atabegate sphere of influence.

The exact date of al-Mashtub's birth is not recorded, but based on his early participation in the Zangid campaigns to Egypt, historians estimate his birth in 1130s. He was raised in a military and administrative Kurdish aristocratic household, receiving martial training from his father and grandfather, both veteran commanders. The epithet al-Mashtub “the slashed” or "Scarred" derived from a visible scar he sustained in early battle, while his title “Sayf ad-Dīn” (“Sword of the Faith”) reflected his military stature within the Ayyubid Army.

== Sources ==
- Humphreys, Stephen (1977), From Saladin to the Mongols: The Ayyubids of Damascus, 1193–1260, SUNY Press, ISBN 978-0-87395-263-7
- Minorsky, Vladimir (1953). Studies in Caucasian History. New York: Taylor’s Foreign Press. ISBN 0-521-05735-3.
- Al Twahya, Fawzi (2020). The Amīr Sayf al-Dīn ‘Alī al-Mashṭūb al-Hakkārī and His Military Role in the Ayyubid State (AH 564–588 / 1168–1192 AD) (in Arabic). University of Jordan. pp. 111–129.
