= Habershon v Vardon =

- Court: Court of Chancery
- Full case name: Habershon v Vardon
- Decided: 30 May 1851

Court membership
- Judge sitting: James Lewis Knight-Bruce

Keywords
- charity

Habershon v Vardon [1851] was a case on the issue of Charitable trusts in English law. In it Sir James Lewis Knight-Bruce, Chancellor of the High Court, ruled that a gift of £1000 to restore the Jews to Palestine was not a charity legacy.

== Facts ==
In 1842 Nadir Baxter, of the Church Pastoral Aid Society, donated £1,000 in his will to restore the Jews to Palestine, stating that the sum "be paid towards the contributions that I do confidently believe and earnestly pray will speedily be begun to be raised under the sanction of our hitherto so highly favored church and nation, in evidence of Christian faith, towards the political restoration of the Jews to Jerusalem and to their own land; and as I conscientiously believe also that the institution by the Anglican Church of the bishopric of Jerusalem is the actual commencement of the great and merciful work of Jehovah towards Zion".

It was agreed that a legacy towards the bishopric of Jerusalem was a good charitable gift, but the validity of the £1000 was questioned.

== Judgment ==
The judgement of Sir James Lewis Knight-Bruce, Chancellor of the High Court, read:

The gift of £1000 is not a charity legacy: it is void. If it can be understood to mean any thing, it is to create a revolution in the dominions of an ally of her Majesty. At any rate, it is totally void.
