= Alroy Jovi =

Indian animator

Alroy Jovi (Prateek Mathur)
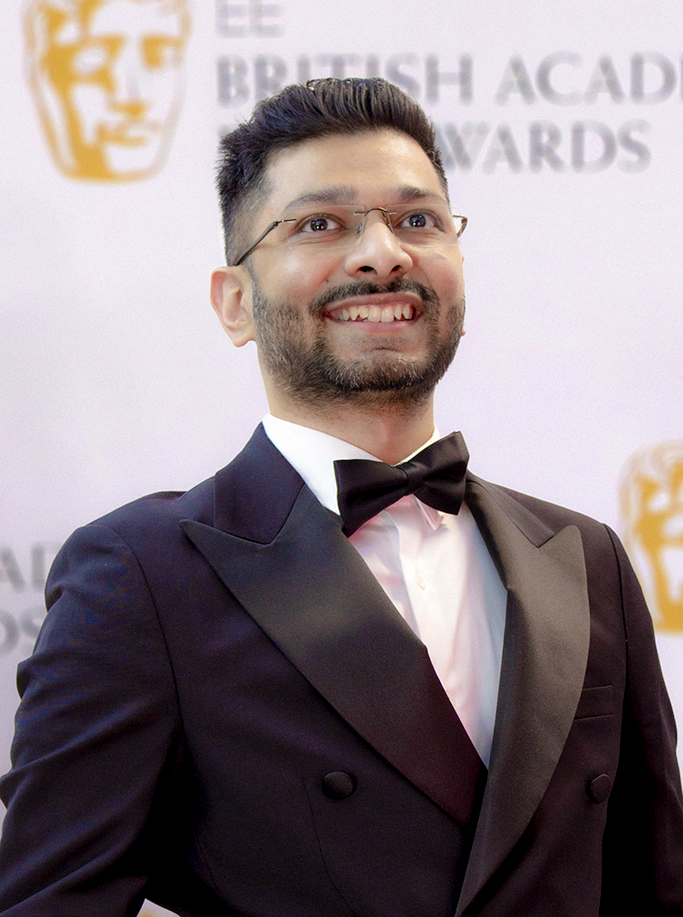
- Prateek Mathur at the 75th British Academy Film Awards, 2022
- Born: Prateek Mathur; 11 December 1987 (age 38); Bhopal, Madhya Pradesh, India
- Occupations: Senior Animator; VFX supervisor; Director
- Years active: 2000–present
- Known for: Founder of Axtelera Ray
- Website: alroyjovi.com

Prateek Mathur, also known as Alroy Jovi (born 11 December 1987), is an Indian animator, visual effects supervisor, CGI/VR project manager, and director working primarily in digital mixed media and the entertainment industry, from music videos and documentaries to short films and blockbusters. He is best known as the founder, creator, and author of the Axtelera Ray fantasy series.

== Early life ==
Prateek Mathur was born in Bhopal, Madhya Pradesh, India. Initially training as an engineer, Prateek's passion for animation led him to study the world of 3D and computer generated imagery. Since, he has worked for different companies on a variety of projects, including feature films such as Harry Potter and the Deathly Hallows – Part 2, Green Lantern and Men in Black 3. His long list of projects also include the virtual reality (VR), augmented reality (AR) industry, developing the look and design of 360 applications and producing 360 content, as well as imputing his boundless creativity in music videos for artists such as The Courteeners, Larkins and Band of Skulls.

Although Prateek is passionate about his work, his love for storytelling, reflected in his interest for the entertainment industry and the various media used to convey a story, led him to create the fantasy series Axtelera Ray. He has worked in collaboration with talented artists, including author Maurice J. Gallagher, developing what initially started as a simple comic into a six novel-long series.

== Career ==
=== Axtelera Ray - Novel Concept ===
In the year 2000, Prateek became fascinated by the mythologies of the world. That interest was spurred by his father, Dr. D.K Mathur, an accomplished archaeologist, who took Prateek along on his numerous excavations across India. It led to Prateek's love of history and legends. From the ancient Egyptians to the Norse gods, Prateek studied these ancient tales, thus imagining what would one day be known as Axtelera Ray. The developing CGI industry also brought with it a huge source of inspiration, bringing to life characters that once lived only in his imagination. Inspired by the Greats such as Stan Lee and JRR Tolkien, Prateek began developing a story that was initially planned as a comic. However, as his idea developed into something much bigger, Axtelera Ray became a series of novels, featuring well-developed characters in the meticulously built world of Octavia. Over the course of the following five years, Prateek spent time refining his story and characters, wishing to offer the world a brand new tale that would take his audience on the adventure of a lifetime.

After travelling to the United Kingdom, in 2013, Prateek got the chance to work with author Maurice J. Gallagher also known as Mo Gallagher, with whom he later shared his idea. Fascinated by the world Prateek was building, Mo eventually came on board, putting into writing Prateek's notes and ideas.

In early 2015, Prateek released a 40-page preview edition of the first book in the series, entitled 'Axtelera Ray: The Chronicles of Astrone'.

In 2018, Prateek released the 90-page preview edition which is available for free to audience across the globe. The full first novel is currently in development, however a complete encyclopaedia of the world of Octavia can be found on the official Axtelera Ray website.

=== Ocean Tears ===
Prateek's desire to use his skills to bring about change with thought-provoking artwork led him to create the concept he entitled 'Ocean Tears'. Inspired by Greta Thunberg and Sky's Ocean Rescue, it came from the idea that with the destruction of the world's fauna's natural habitats, animals would come out of the oceans, forests and jungles to protest. The initial idea featured a Humpback Whale, floating across the sky in Manchester's Media City, forced to leave the polluted oceans to find a cleaner home. This long-running campaign would see the whale appear in different places around the globe. Furthermore, in order to spread the awareness of climate change, Prateek has provided the full source material to any artist who desires to get involved.

=== London Olympic ===
While working as a volunteer for Sports Maker, Rush Hockey and UK Centre for Carnival Arts, Prateek produced graphics such as posters and promo videos for various events. These graphics were then used nationally as well as internationally by sports companies, leading him to win the 2012 Bedfordshire Gold achievement award. He was invited to join the 2012 London Olympic Sports/Game Makers parade with the Olympic Gold medallist Etienne Stott in Bedford, and was later awarded the title of Young People of the Year (YOPEY's) positive role model 2012 by the founder Tony Gearing MBE, endorsed by the leaders of all three main political parties, Prime Minister David Cameron, Deputy Prime Minister Nick Clegg, and Opposition leader Ed Miliband.

=== UKCCA ===
Prateek volunteered with UKCCA, the UK Centre for Carnival Arts, which aims to promote the carnival arts and communities, providing large spaces and technical facilities across the UK. This major new cultural resource attracts thousands of people each year including carnival artists, schools, course attendees, conference visitors and creative industry start-ups. It is run by the Luton Carnival Arts Development Trust (LCADT). The UKCCA enabled Prateek to meet and work for renown companies, eventually leading him to join the 2012 London Olympics Sports/Game Makers parade and produce artwork for these large scale events.

=== Beauty and the Beast ===
In 2015, after Disney first confirmed Emma Watson had been cast as Belle in the new live-action film Beauty and the Beast, Prateek produced a brilliant concept artwork of the actress in the protagonist's iconic yellow dress. The finished piece created a buzz and was posted and shared on social networks such as Twitter and Facebook. It was featured in The Ellen DeGeneres Show, as well as in a number of magazines including Look, Business Insider, Moviepilot, Ok!, Popsugar, m-magazine and Techinsider. The speed painting of the artwork is featured on Prateek's website, showing the work and detail that went into the making-of the poster.

== Awards ==
- 2019 – The Lossen GOLD REMI Award winner at WorldFest-Houston International Film Festival
- 2018 – Grand Award winner for best Fantasy Short for The Lossen film at Rhode Island International Film Festival
- 2015 – Awarded CC programme award from the Royal Opera House.
- 2014 – Awarded Studentship Award from the University of Bedfordshire.
- 2014 – Nominated for Vice Chancellor's Awards 'Staff Team of the Year Award' from the University of Bedfordshire.
- 2014 – Awarded Certificate of Recognition from the BedsSU Volunteering.
- 2014 – Nominated for Outstanding Achievement Award University of Bedfordshire Students' Union.
- 2013 – Awarded Bedfordshire Edge Award
- 2013 – Awarded Outstanding Achievement Award from the BedsSU & Volunteering England.
- 2012 – Nominated for 2012 Young People of the Year & been awarded a title of 'YOPEY – The Positive Role Model of 2012' (England).
- 2012 – Gold Achievement Award from the University of Bedfordshire & Volunteering England (List of volunteer awards)
- 2012 – Awarded SIS award (certificate) from University of Bedfordshire.
- 2011 – Awarded 3D Animation (Expert) certified by the University of Cambridge.
- 2011 – Awarded Advanced Diploma in Animation & VFX by Maya Academy of Advanced Cinematics (MAAC).
- 2011 – Awarded Certificate of merit in Advanced Diploma in 3D Animation & Visual Effects – Expert with Specialization in VFX.
- 2010 – Nominated for 7th Annual 24FPS Animation Award.
- 2010 – Best Visual effects short film (Maac Team) in 7th Annual 24FPS Animation Award by Maya Academy of Advanced Cinematics (MAAC).
- 2008 – Awarded for best Presentation from Shree Institute of Science & Technology (SIST).
- 2008 – Awarded a certificate on New Horizon of Mechanical Engineering at 15th ISME International Conference by Rajiv Gandhi Proudyogiki Vishwavidyalaya.
- 2008 – Nominated of Robotic Artificial Intelligence (AI) by 15th ISME International Conference on New Horizon of Mechanical Engineering.
- 2008 – Silver prize winner for Robotic in NRI.

== Filmography ==
- 2022 – Xylem Inc. Let's solve water (Lead CG & VFX)
- 2021 – FA Women's Super League Match of the day Live BBC Sport (Lead CG & VFX)
- 2021 – Bukayo Saka - New Balance This Little Chilli Brings Heat (Lead CG & VFX)
- 2021 – Harry The Hamster short film (Visual Effects Supervisor)
- 2021 – Bufflehead short film (Visual Effects Supervisor)
- 2021 – The Gifted Hypothesis short film (Visual Effects Supervisor)
- 2021 – The Lost Keys short film (Visual Effects Supervisor)
- 2021 – A Sense of Space short film (Visual Effects Supervisor)
- 2021 – UEFA Euro 2020 opening sequence (Lead CG & VFX)
- 2021 – A Walk Home short film (Visual Effects Supervisor)
- 2021 – Bach is Blue short film (Visual Effects Artist)
- 2021 – Super Blood short film (Visual Effects Supervisor)
- 2021 – Remind Me Yesterday short film (Visual Effects Supervisor)
- 2021 – Bolt from the Dark animated art film (Director)
- 2021 – The VAR Room (Lead CG & VFX)
- 2020 - 2021 – Doves (band) - Carousels Music Video (Lead CG Animator)
- 2020 – Blossoms (band): Back To Stockport (Lead CG & VFX)
- 2020 – David vs Goliath master of Poker (Lead CG & VFX)
- 2020 – The Big Night In BBC One, Comic Relief (Lead CG & VFX)
- 2019 - 2020 – The Courteeners - Hanging Off Your Cloud (Lead CG & VFX)
- 2019 - 2020 – The Courteeners - Better Man (Lead CG & VFX)
- 2019 - 2020 – The Courteeners - Heavy Jacket (Lead CG & VFX)
- 2019 - 2020 – Band Of Skulls - Love Is All You Love (Lead CG & VFX)
- 2019 - 2020 – Band Of Skulls - We're Alive (Lead CG & VFX)
- 2019 - 2020 – Band Of Skulls - Cool Your Battles (Lead CG & VFX)
- 2019 – STATSport advertisement (Lead CG & VFX)
- 2019 – 2019 Netball World Cup on BBC (Lead CG & VFX)
- 2019 – Larkins - TV Dream (Lead CG & VFX)
- 2019 – Footsteps of Tagore documentary film (Lead Animator)
- 2015 – 2018 – The Lossen film by Moon Watcher Media (Lead VFX Artist)
- 2000 – present – Axtelera-Ray (Director/producer)
- 2016 – 2017 – Infinite Mixed Reality Studios (VR/3D Project Manager)
- 2013 – Final Fantasy VII the web series (Lead Animator/VFX Specialist)
- 2012 – (YOPEY) Young people of the year promo (Designer/Animator)
- 2012 – Camp Canyon, Summer Camp Film, Bethany, West Virginia, US
- 2011 – AmeriCamp promo advertisement (Designer/Animator)
- 2010 – H2O is a Virtual Operating System (Conceptual VFX Advertisement) Annual 24FPS Animation Award (Visual effect artist)
- 2010 – Harry Potter and the Deathly Hallows – Part 2 (stereoscopic/rotoscopy artist)
- 2010 – Green Lantern (stereoscopic/rotoscopy artist)
- 2010 – Men in Black 3 (stereoscopic/rotoscopy artist)
