= Amedi =

Amedi ئامێدی Amêdî
- Town
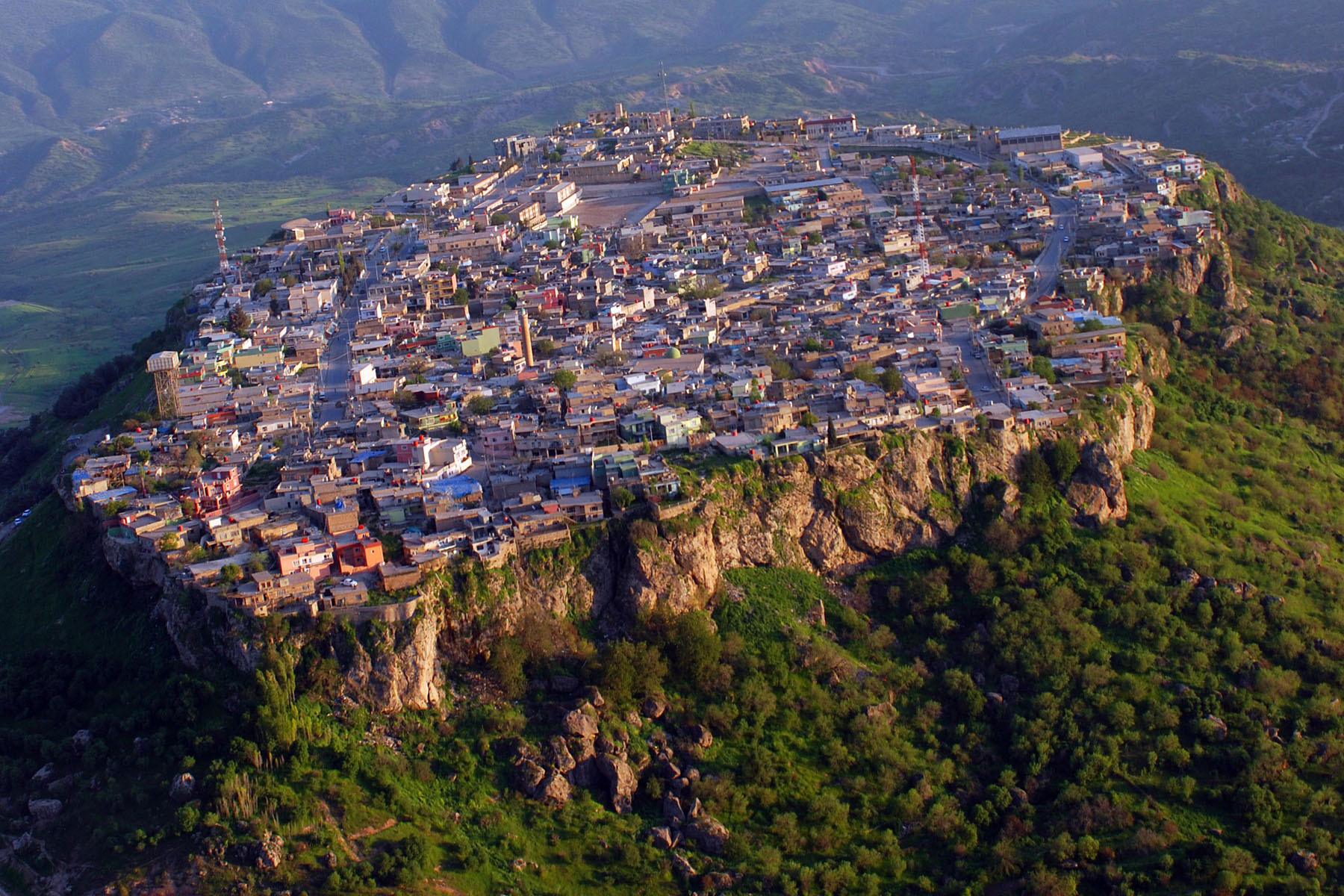
- Bird's eye view of Amêdî

- Location within Iraq Location within Iraqi Kurdistan
- Coordinates: 37°05′33″N 43°29′14″E
- Country: Iraq
- Federal region: Iraqi Kurdistan
- Governorate: Duhok
- District: Amedi
- Founded: Before 3000 B.C.

Government
  - Type: Mayor
- Elevation: 3,900 ft (1,200 m)

Population
  - Total: 11,000
- Time zone: GMT +3
- Postcode: 42008

Amedi or Amadiye (Kurdish: ئامێدی, romanized: Amêdî; Arabic: العمادية; Lishanid Noshan: עמידיא, romanized: ʿAmədya) is a town in the Duhok Governorate in Kurdistan Region, Iraq. It is built on a mesa in the broader Great Zab river valley.

== Etymology ==
According to ibn al-Athir, the Arabic name "ʿAmadiyya" is eponymous to Imad al-Din Zengi, who built a Citadel in 1142 on the site of an earlier fortification called āšib. Another theory is that the name derives from Imad al-Dawla, but this theory is less likely.

According to Professor Jeffrey Szuchman, Amedi is of Hurrian or Urartian origin.

== History ==
From the Early Bronze Age until it came under the control of the Mitanni in the 16th century BC, Amedi region was part of Kurda and it was entirely inhabited by Subartu, which did not speak a Semitic language. During the rule of the Mittani, the inhabitants of this region were known as Zubarians.

After the fall of the Mittani, Amedi was conquered by Ashurnasirpal I of the Middle Assyrian Empire in the 11th century BC after he fought a vicious campaign against the Mittani Empire.

After the fall of the Assyrian Empire, the Amedi region came under the rule of the Medes. When Xenophon passed through the region in the 4th century BC, he referred to its inhabitants as the Medes and identified the sparsely inhabited area as “ruined Median cities“. Later Amedi area was incorporated into the Achaemenid Empire under the name of Media Magna. Under the rule of the Parthian Empire Amedi region was part of the Barchan (Barzan) district. Eventually it became an integral part of the Sasanian Empire in the district of Adiabene until it was conquered by the Muslims in 640s, after they defeated the Kurds in Tikrit, Mosul and Saharzor.

Then, for several centuries, after the Abbasid Revolution in the seventh century, it was ruled by an amir from the royal Abbasid dynasty, reputed to be one of the richest families in the region.

Amedi was the birthplace of the messiah claimant David Alroy (fl. 1160). In 1163, according to Joseph ha-Kohen's Emeq ha-Baka, the Jewish population numbered about a thousand families and traded in gall-nuts. Alroy led a revolt against the city but was defeated and killed in the process. The Spanish Jewish historian Solomon ibn Verga (1450–1525) portrayed the Jewish community of Amedi at the time of Alroy as wealthy and contented.

Amedi was the seat of the semi-autonomous Bahdinan, which lasted from 1376 to 1843. There are ruins of the Qubahan School in Amedi which was founded during the region of Sultan Hussein Wali of Bahdinan (1534–1576) AD for the study of Islamic Sciences. There are also ruins of a synagogue and a tomb attributed to Ezekiel a church in the small town. One of the icons of the city is the Great Mosque of Amedi, which dates back to the 12th century and the oldest and largest in the region.

In 1760, the Dominican Leopoldo Soldini founded a mission for Kurdistan in Amedi, with his colleague Maurizio Garzoni. Garzoni lived there for fourteen years and composed a 4,600 word Italian-Kurdish dictionary and grammar. The dictionary is a key work because it represents the first study of the Kurdish grammar and language; for this reason, Garzoni is often called the “father of Kurdology”. In 1907, the population numbered 6,000, of whom 2,500 were Kurds, 1,900 Jews and 1,600 Chaldean Catholic Assyrians.

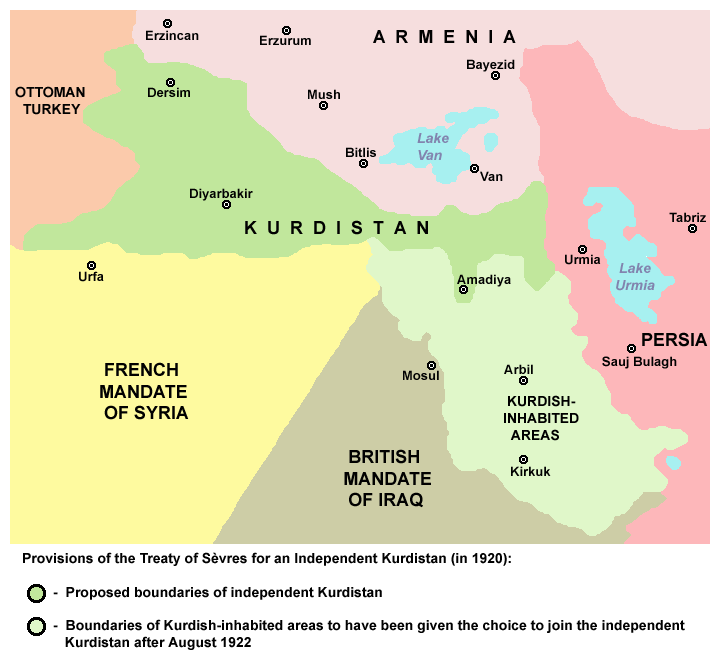
Provisions of the Treaty of Sèvres for an independent Kurdistan (in 1920)

== Geography ==
=== Climate ===
Amedi has a hot-summer Mediterranean climate (Köppen climate classification: Csa) with hot summers and cool, wet winters. Being the most northerly city in Iraq, it is the mildest major city in the country. Snow falls occasionally in the winter.

Climate data for Amadiya
Month	Jan	Feb	Mar	Apr	May	Jun	Jul	Aug	Sep	Oct	Nov	Dec	Year
Mean daily maximum °C (°F)	6.2 (43.2)	7.8 (46.0)	12.1 (53.8)	17.8 (64.0)	25.1 (77.2)	31.9 (89.4)	36.3 (97.3)	36.2 (97.2)	32.2 (90.0)	24.4 (75.9)	15.4 (59.7)	8.4 (47.1)	21.2 (70.2)
Daily mean °C (°F)	1.9 (35.4)	3.2 (37.8)	7.2 (45.0)	12.5 (54.5)	18.8 (65.8)	24.6 (76.3)	28.8 (83.8)	28.5 (83.3)	24.5 (76.1)	17.6 (63.7)	10.2 (50.4)	4.2 (39.6)	15.2 (59.4)
Mean daily minimum °C (°F)	−2.4 (27.7)	−1.3 (29.7)	2.4 (36.3)	7.2 (45.0)	12.5 (54.5)	17.4 (63.3)	21.4 (70.5)	20.9 (69.6)	16.8 (62.2)	10.9 (51.6)	5.0 (41.0)	0.0 (32.0)	9.2 (48.6)
Average precipitation mm (inches)	126 (5.0)	176 (6.9)	156 (6.1)	128 (5.0)	56 (2.2)	0 (0)	0 (0)	0 (0)	1 (0.0)	32 (1.3)	96 (3.8)	126 (5.0)	897 (35.3)
Average precipitation days	7	6	10	8	4	0	0	0	1	7	7	10	60
Source 1: World Weather Online (precipitation days)
Source 2: Climate-Data (temperatures and rainfall amount)

== Gallery ==
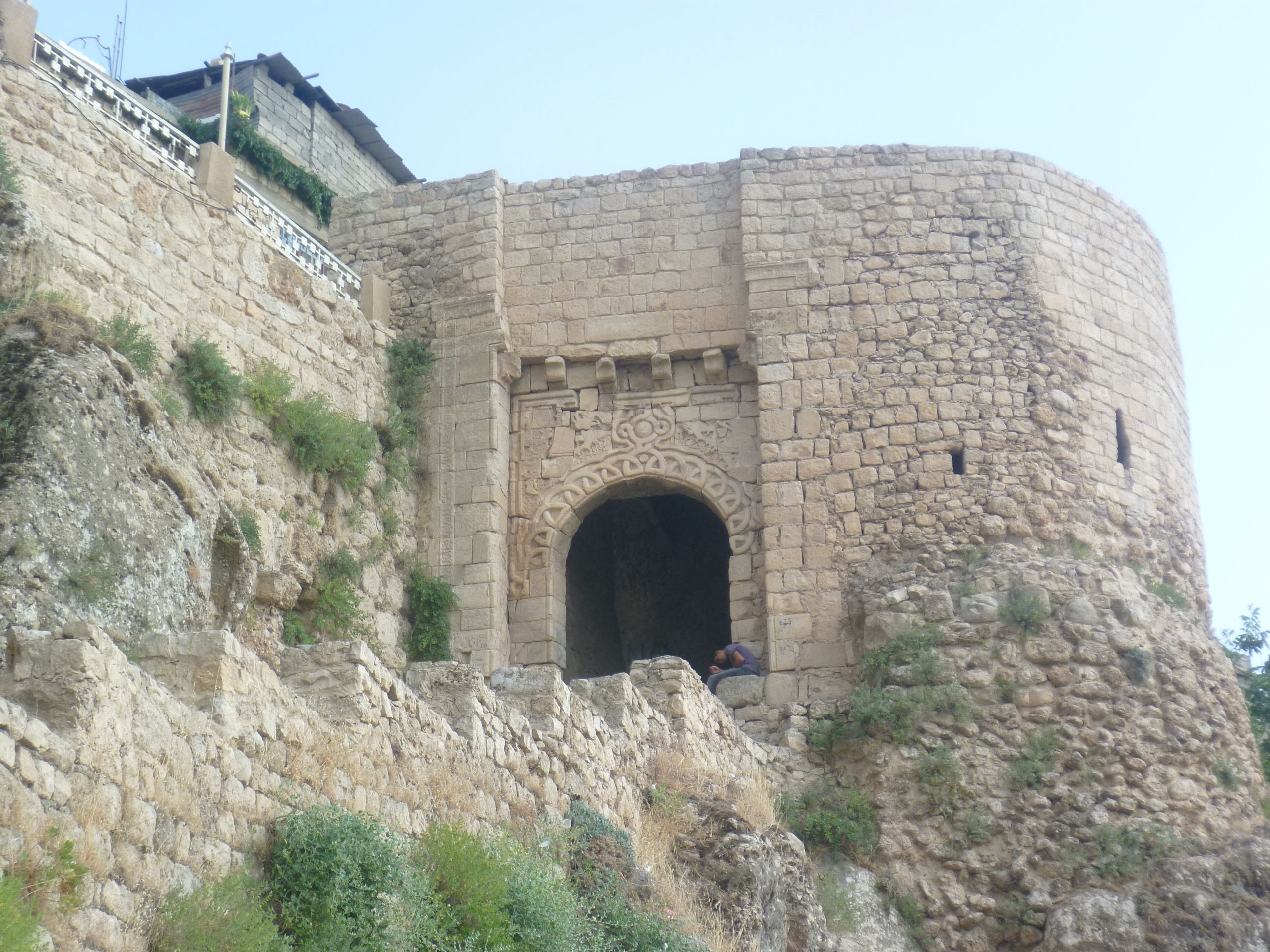
Citadel of Amedi

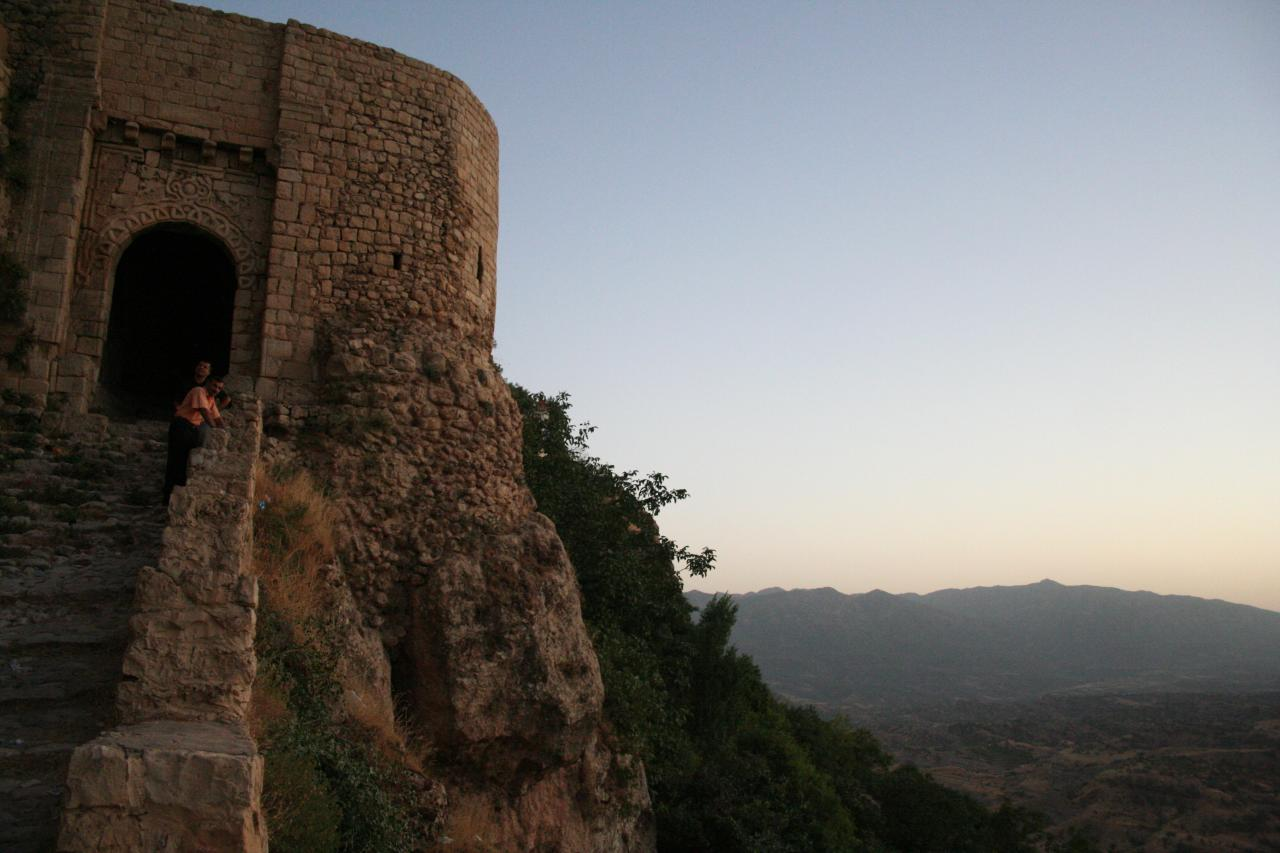
The Badinan Gate, and the entrance to the Citadel

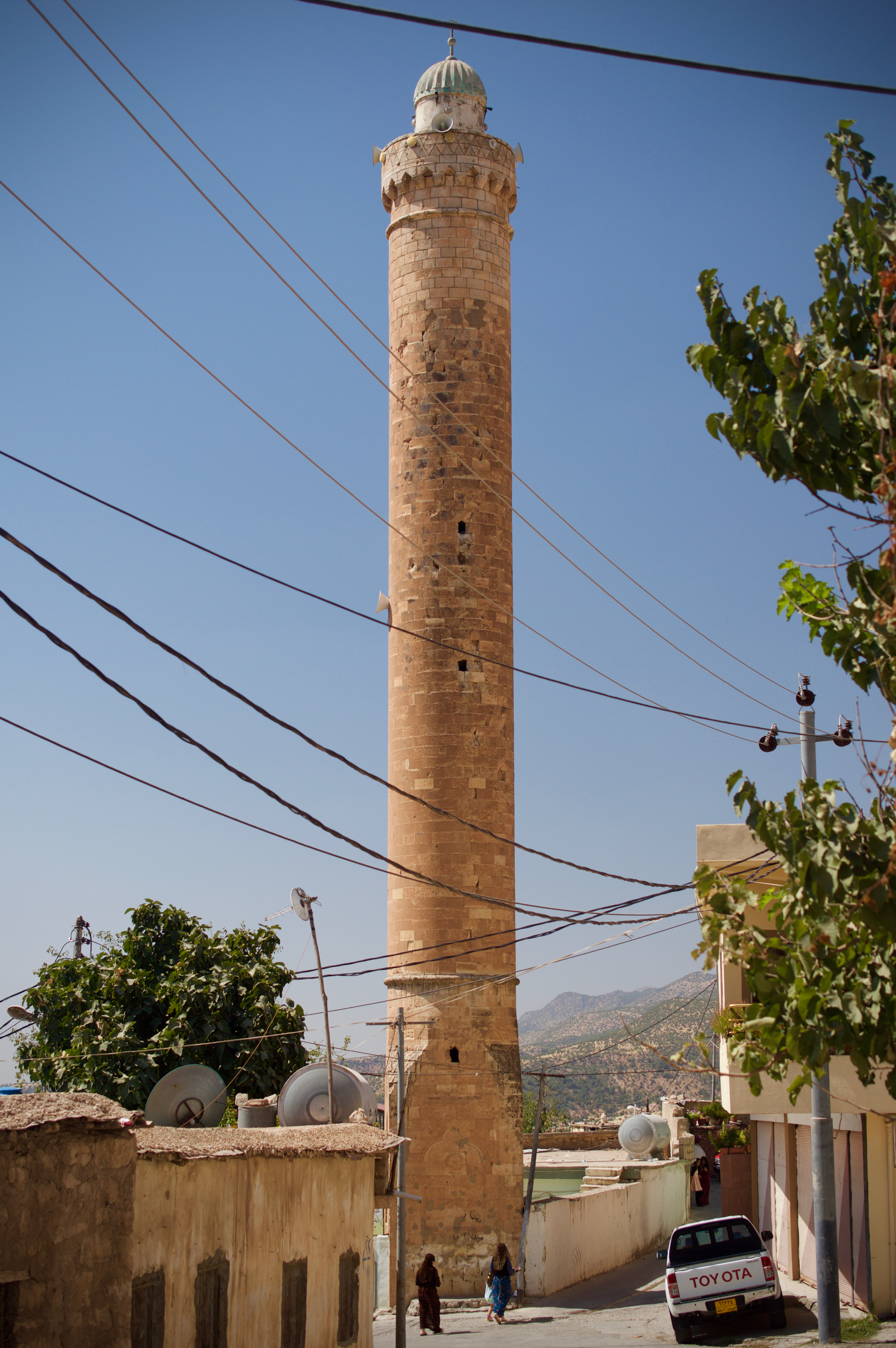
Great Mosque of Amedi

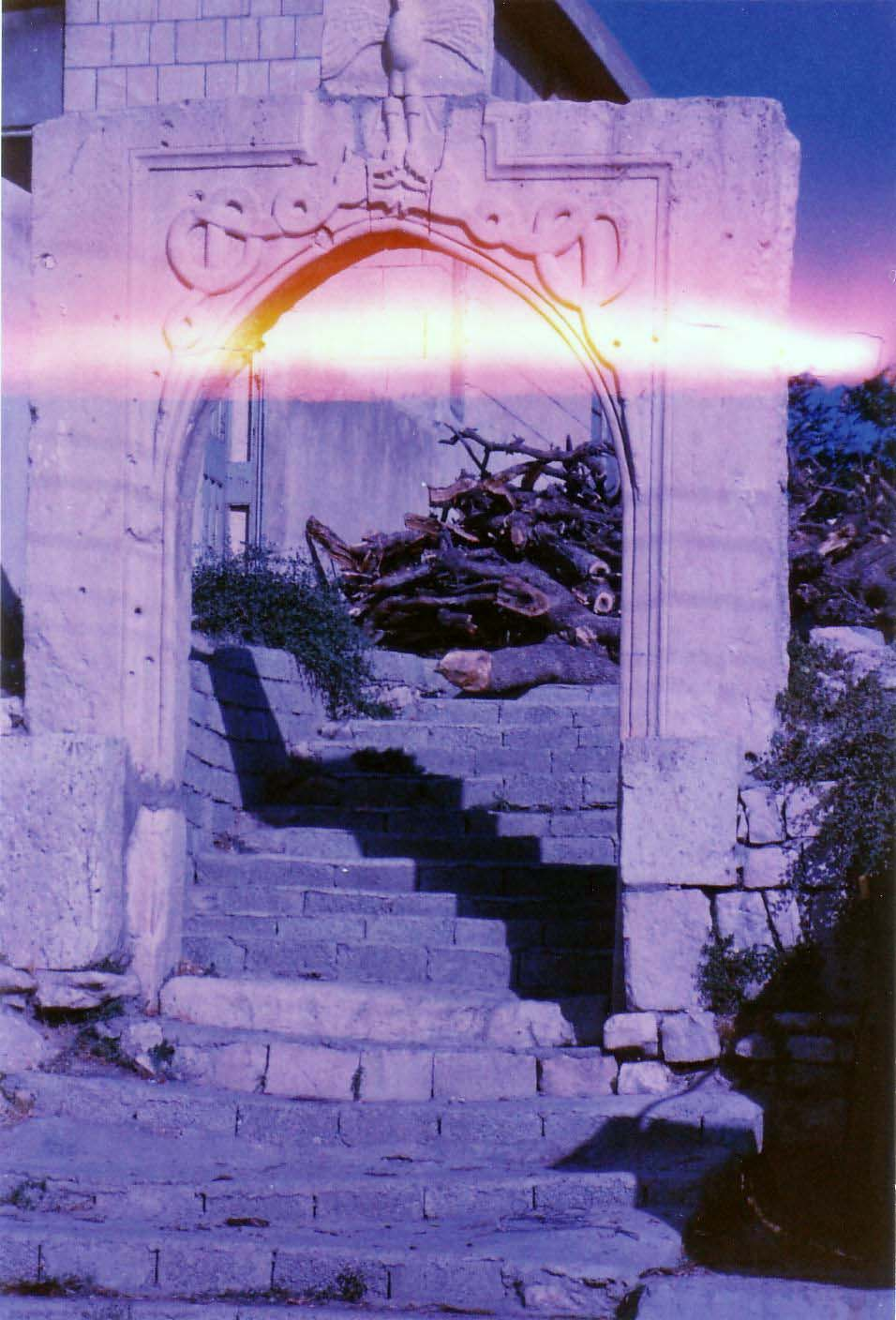
Amedi Gate (1994)

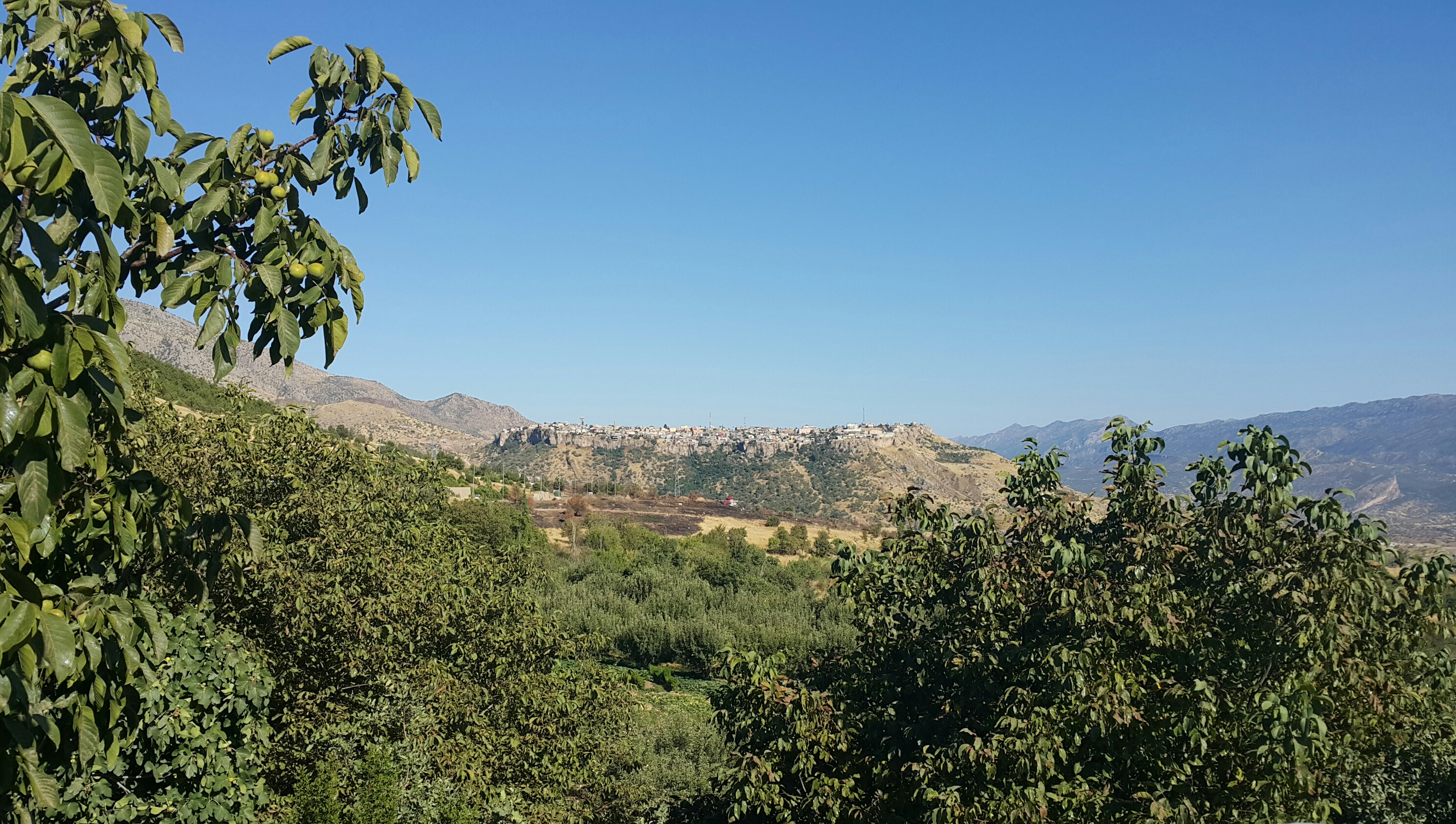
View of Amedi City, Duhok

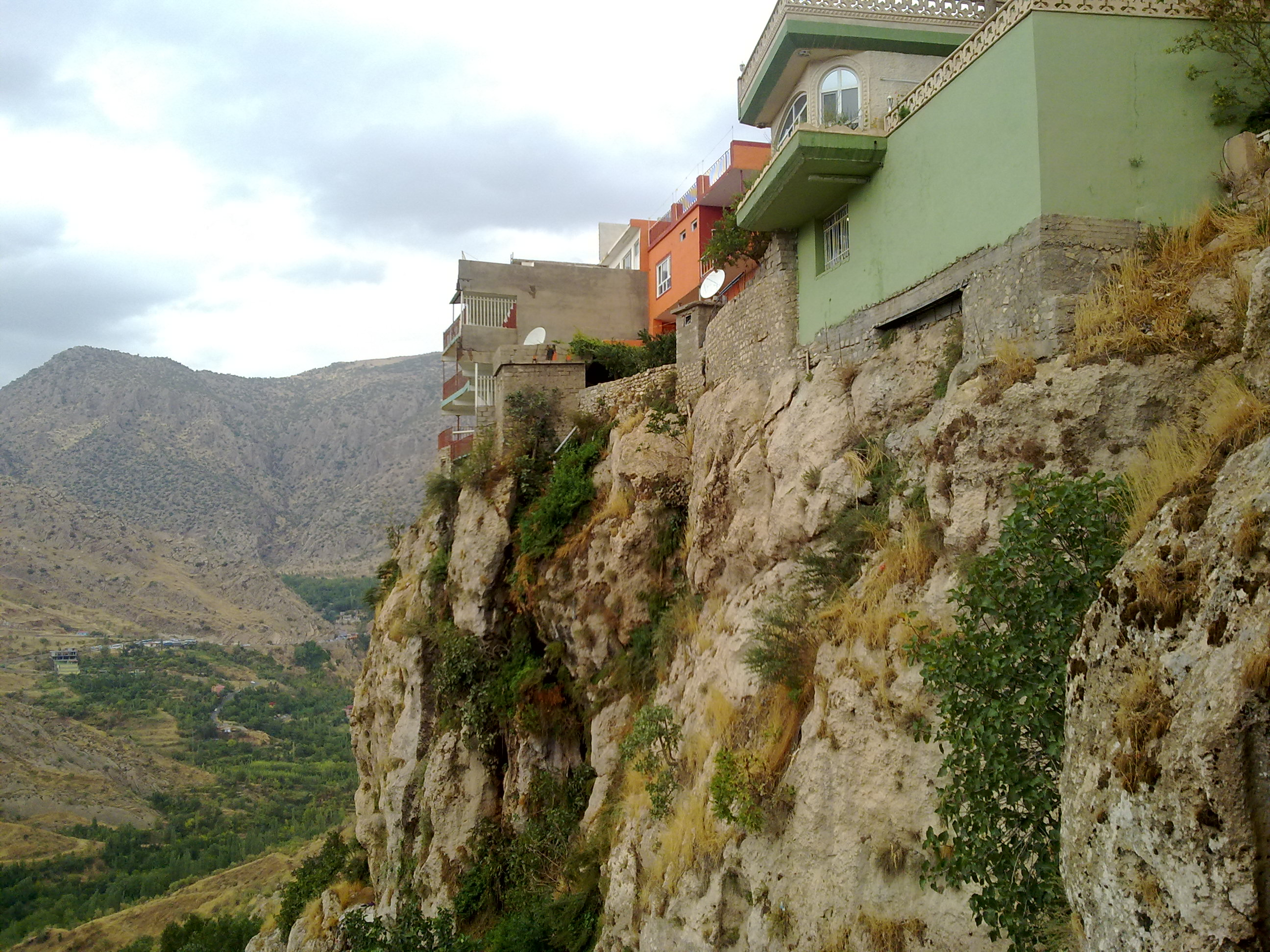
Panoramic view from the Badinan Gate

== Notable people ==
- David Alroy (12th century), Jewish messiah claimant
- Sayf ad-Din Mashtub (1130-1192) Kurdish Emir and military commandeur of the Ayyubid Sultanate
- Ali Kurdi Maqtul (died 1519) sufi shaykh and alim
- Ismat T. Kittani (1929-2001), politician
- Tahsin Taha (1941–1995), singer
- Ali Tatar (born 1968), politician
- Nizar Amidi (born 1968), politician and President of Iraq

== See also ==
- Siege of Amadiya
- Bahdinan
- Kurds in Iraq
