= James Knight-Bruce =

English barrister, judge and politician

The Right Honourable Sir James Knight-Bruce FSA FRS
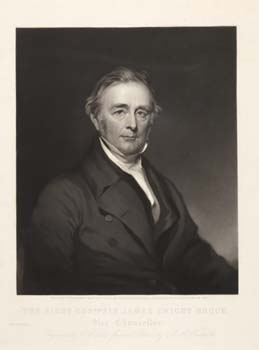

Lord Justice of Appeal in Chancery
- In office 8 October 1851 – 7 November 1866
- Appointed by: Lord John Russell

Personal details
- Born: 15 February 1791 Barnstaple
- Died: 7 November 1866 (aged 75) Roehampton Priory, Surrey
- Resting place: Cheriton, Kent

Sir James Lewis Knight-Bruce, FSA, FRS (born James Lewis Knight; 15 February 1791 – 7 November 1866) was an English barrister, judge and politician.

== Life ==
He was the youngest son of John Knight of Fairlinch, Devon, by Margaret, daughter and heiress of William Bruce of Llanblethian, Glamorgan. He was born at Barnstaple on 15 February 1791, and was educated at King Edward's grammar school, Bath, and at Sherborne. He left Sherborne in 1805, and, after spending two years with a mathematical tutor, was articled to a solicitor in Lincoln's Inn Fields. When his articles had expired, he was admitted a student of Lincoln's Inn on 21 July 1812.

On 21 November 1817 Knight was called to the bar, and for a short time went the Welsh circuit. The increase of his chancery practice soon caused him to abandon the common law bar, and he confined himself to practising in the equity courts. In Michaelmas term 1829 he was appointed a king's counsel, and on 6 November in the same year was elected a bencher of Lincoln's Inn. On taking silk he selected the vice-chancellor's court, where Sir Edward Sugden was the leader; they had constant contests until Sugden's appointment as Lord Chancellor of Ireland in 1834.

In politics Knight was a Tory, and in April 1831 he was returned for Bishop's Castle, a pocket borough belonging to Edward Clive, 1st Earl of Powis. His parliamentary career, however, was short, for the borough was disfranchised by the Great Reform Bill. In 1834 he received the honorary degree of D.C.L. from the University of Oxford. In 1835 he was one of the counsel heard at the bar of the House of Lords on behalf of the municipal corporations against the Municipal Reform Bill, and in 1851 on behalf of the deans and chapters against the Ecclesiastical Duties and Revenues Bill.

Coats of Arms of Sir James Lewis Knight-Bruce

In 1835 and in 1837, Knight unsuccessfully contested the borough of Cambridge. In September 1837 he assumed the additional surname of Bruce by royal licence. On the abolition of the Court of Exchequer in equity and the transfer of its jurisdiction to the Court of Chancery, he was on 28 October 1841 appointed by Sir Robert Peel one of the two additional vice-chancellors under 5 Vict. c. 5. He was subsequently knighted, and on 15 January 1842 was sworn a member of the privy council. In Michaelmas term 1842 he undertook the further duties of chief judge in bankruptcy, and seven years later the exercise of the jurisdiction of the old Court of Review was given to him. In 1842–3 he held the yearly office of treasurer of Lincoln's Inn, and in that office laid the foundation-stone of the new hall and library of the inn on 20 April 1843. On the creation of the Court of Appeal in chancery Lord John Russell appointed Knight-Bruce and Lord Cranworth the first lords justices on 8 October 1851. In this court, Knight-Bruce sat for nearly 16 years.

He was a Fellow of the Society of Antiquaries of London and elected a Fellow of the Royal Society in 1830.

Knight-Bruce died suddenly on 7 November 1866 at Roehampton Priory, Surrey, shortly after his retirement from the bench. His wife had also died suddenly just seven months prior to this on 27 April 1866. He was buried in Cheriton churchyard, near Folkestone, on 14 November.

== Cases ==
Knight-Bruce wished to shorten procedure and save time in the discussion of technicalities, and in some of his decisions, which were over-ruled by Lord Cottenham, he anticipated reforms which were subsequently made.

He frequently sat on the judicial committee of the privy council. In the Gorham case he differed from the judgment of the majority of the court, which was pronounced by Lord Langdale, M.R., on 8 March 1850.

== Family ==
On 20 August 1812 Knight-Bruce, as James Knight, married Eliza Mountford (Newte), the acknowledged daughter of Captain Thomas Newte of Duvale, near Bampton, Devon, by whom he had several children.
