= David Alroy =

Jewish messiah claimant (fl. 1160)

David Alroy or Alroyi or Alrui ( Kurdish: داود ئەلرۆی, Hebrew: דָּוִד אַלְרוֹאִי, Arabic: داود ابن الروحي, fl. 1160), also known as Ibn ar-Ruhi and David El-David, was a Jewish Messiah claimant born in Amedi, in present-day Iraq, under the name Menaḥem ben Solomon (Hebrew: מְנַחֵם בֵּן שְׁלֹמֹה). David Alroy studied Torah and Talmud under Hasdai the Exilarch, and Ali, the head of the Nizamiyya of Baghdad. He was also well-versed in Muslim literature and known as a worker of magic.

== Historical background ==
The caliphate in the days of Alroy was in a chaotic state. The Crusades had caused a general condition of unrest and a weakening of the authority of the sultans of Asia Minor and Persia. Defiant chieftains set up small independent states and heavy poll taxes were levied on all males above the age of fifteen.

== Messianic claims ==
David Alroy led an uprising against Abbasid caliph al-Muqtafi and called upon the Jewish community to follow him to Jerusalem, where he would be their king and free the Jews from the hands of the Muslims. Alroy recruited supporters in the mountains of Chaftan, and sent letters to Mosul, Baghdad, and other towns, proclaiming his divine mission. He was born Menaḥem ben Solomon, but adopted the name "David Alroy" ("Alroy" possibly meaning "the inspired one") when he began claiming to be the Messiah.

He was able to convince many Jewish people to join him and Alroy soon found himself with a considerable following. He resolved to attack the citadel of his native town, Amedi, and directed his supporters to assemble in that city, with swords and other weapons concealed under their robes, and to give, as a pretext for their presence, their desire to study the Talmud.

What followed is uncertain, for the sources of the life of Alroy each tell a different tale in which events are interwoven with legend. It is believed that Alroy and his followers were defeated, and Alroy was put to death. Despite Alroy's death, Jewish communities in Iran, particularly in Tabriz, Khoy and Maragheh continued to regard David Alroy as their messiah according to mathematician and historian Al-Samawal al-Maghribi.

== Benjamin of Tudela's account ==
Benjamin of Tudela relates that the news of Alroy's revolt reached the ears of the Sultan, who sent for him. "Art thou the King of the Jews?" asked the Muslim sovereign, to which Alroy replied, "I am." The Sultan thereupon cast him into prison in Tabaristan. Three days later, while the Sultan and his council were engaged in considering Alroy's rebellion, he suddenly appeared in their midst, having miraculously made his escape from prison. The Sultan at once ordered Alroy's rearrest; but, using magic, he made himself invisible and left the palace. Guided by the voice of Alroy the Sultan and his nobles followed him to the banks of a river, where, having made himself visible, he was seen to cross the water on a shawl, and made his escape with ease. On the same day he returned to Amadia, a journey which ordinarily took ten days, and related the story to his followers.

The Sultan threatened to put the Jews of his dominion to the sword if Alroy did not surrender, and the Jewish authorities in Baghdad pressed Alroy to abandon his messianic aspirations. From Mosul also an appeal was made to him by Zakkai and Joseph Barihan Alfalaḥ, the leaders of the Jewish community; but all in vain. The governor of Amadia, Saïf al-Din, bribed his father-in-law to assassinate him, and the revolt was brought to an end. The Jews of Persia had considerable difficulty in appeasing the wrath of the Sultan, and were obliged to pay a large indemnity.

Alroy's death did not entirely destroy the belief in his mission. Two impostors came to Bagdad and announced that upon a certain night they were all commanded to commence a flight through the air from Bagdad to Jerusalem, and, in the meantime, the followers of Alroy were to give their property into the charge of these two messengers from their dead leader. For many years afterward, a sect of Menaḥemites, as they were termed, continued to revere the memory of Alroy.

== Historical sources ==
The principal source of the life of Alroy is Benjamin of Tudela's Travels. This version is followed in its main outlines by Solomon ibn Verga, in his Shebeṭ Yehudah. Ibn Verga states, on the authority of Maimonides, that when asked for a proof that he was truly the Messiah, Alroy (or David El-David, as Ibn Verga and David Gans in his ẒemaḦ David call him) replied, "Cut off my head and I shall yet live." David Gans, Gedaliah ibn Yahya (in his Shalshelet ha-Ḳabbalah), who calls him David Almusar, and R. Joseph ben Isaac Sambari closely follow Benjamin of Tudela's version. The name Menahem ibn Alruhi ("the inspired one"), and the concluding episode of the imposters of Baghdad, are derived from the contemporaneous chronicle of the apostate, Samuel ibn Abbas. The name Menahem (i.e., the comforter) was a common Messianic appellation. The name Alroy is probably identical with Alruhi.

== Legacy ==
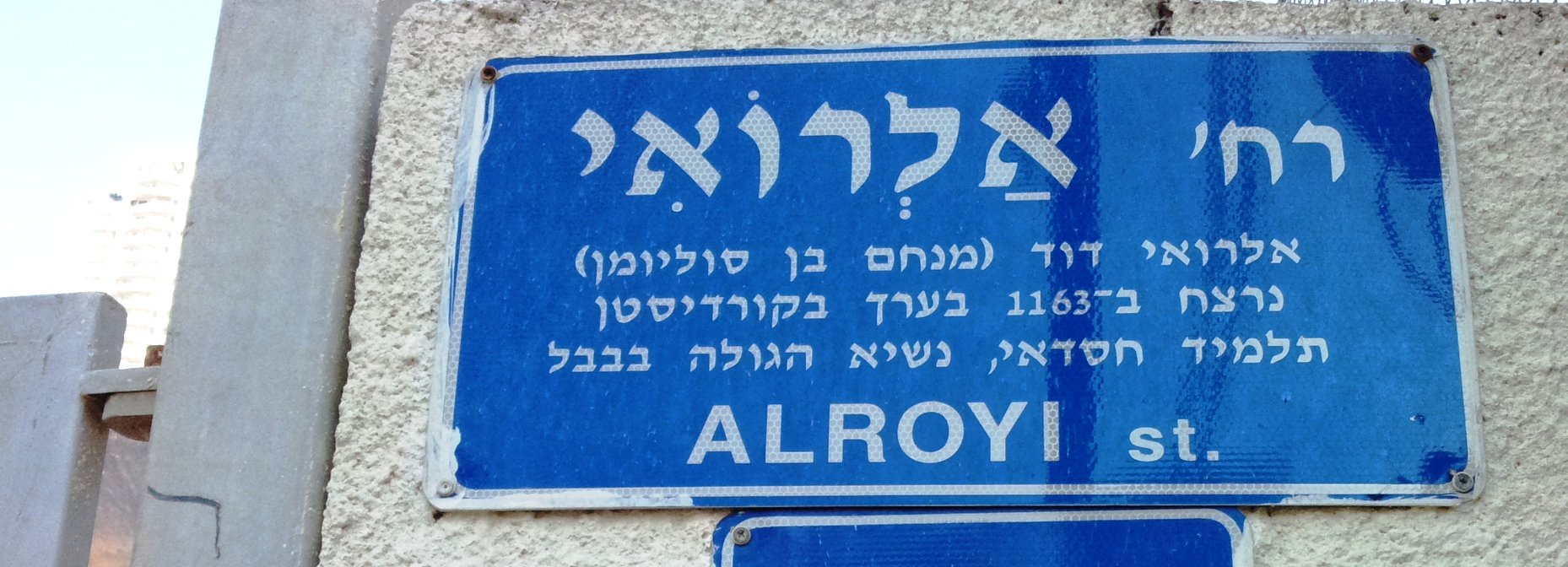
Street sign of road named after Alroy in Tel Aviv

British prime minister Benjamin Disraeli wrote the 1833 novel The Wondrous Tale of Alroy based on David Alroy and his revolt.

== See also ==
- Jewish Messiah claimants
