= The Wondrous Tale of Alroy =

1833 novel by Benjamin Disraeli

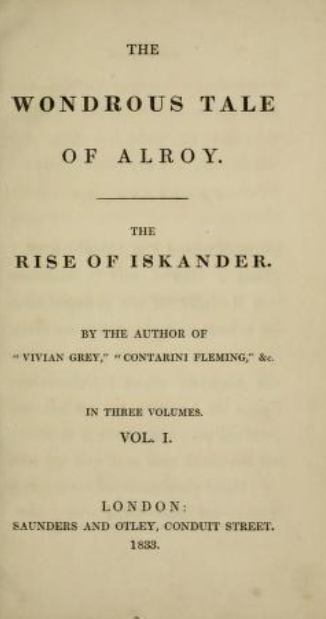
- Title page for The Wondrous Tale of Alroy (1833)
- Author: Benjamin Disraeli
- Language: English
- Publication date: 1833
- Media type: Print

The Wondrous Tale of Alroy is the sixth novel written by Benjamin Disraeli, who would later become a Prime Minister of Britain. Originally published in 1833, a "new edition” was published in 1834, a heavily revised edition in 1846 entitled Alroy: A Romance and another in 1871 based on that. It is a fictionalised account of the life of David Alroy. Its significance lies in its portrayal of Disraeli's "ideal ambition" and for its being his only novel with a distinctive Jewish subject. Cecil Roth described it as perhaps the earliest Jewish historical novel and Adam Kirsch as "a significant proto-Zionist text". Philip Rieff described an answer by Alroy as "perhaps one of the earliest Zionist perorations given in Western literature".

== Synopsis ==
Set in the 12th-century Middle East, the novel starts with Alroy's accession as the Prince of Captivity on his 18th birthday. Shortly afterwards Alroy has to flee after he kills the governor of Hamadan, who had assaulted Alroy's sister Miriam. At a desert oasis, Alroy meets the mystic Jabaster, who tells him that he is destined to restore the Jews to their former greatness but first he must find Solomon's sceptre. Jabaster gives Alroy his brother's emerald ring, so that he can call upon his brother to help at any time. Alroy is then kidnapped in a deserted city but is able to leave when his captors realise he is a Jew since the mother of their leader, Scherirah, was a Jewess. He subsequently collapses with heat exhaustion in the desert, where he is discovered by a caravan returning from Mecca. They stab him and leave him for dead when they realise he is a Jew, but a Kurd rescues him.

The novel then skips to Alroy being rescued from a merchant, who has accused him of stealing the emerald ring, by the Caliph's physician, Lord Honain, who turns out to be Jabaster's brother. Honain takes Alroy (masquerading as his deaf, dumb eunuch slave) to observe Princess Schirene, the Caliph's daughter by a Jewess, who is lined up to marry the King of Karasmé, whom she detests. Tormented by his love of the unobtainable princess, Alroy leaves for Jerusalem, where he visits some ancient tombs and recovers Solomon's sceptre.

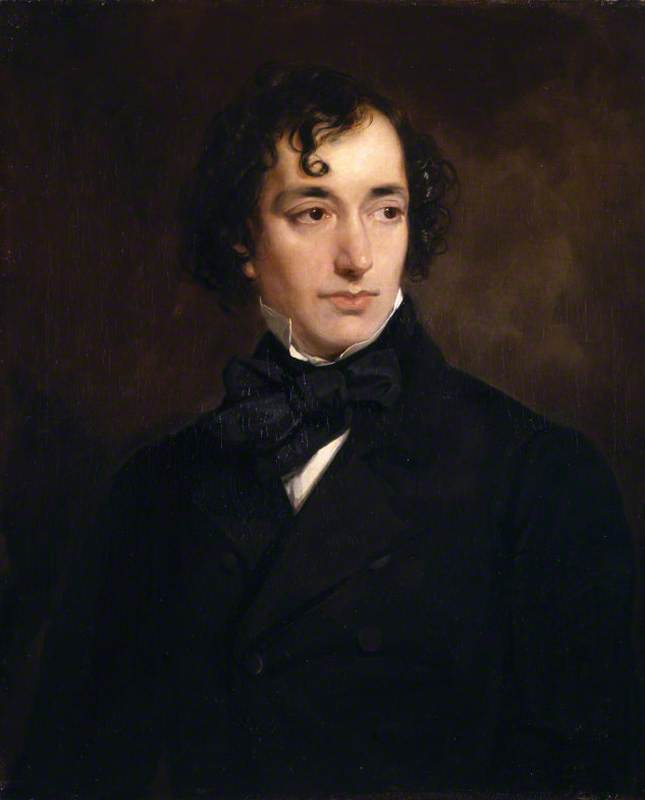
Retrospective 1852 portrait of Disraeli as a young man when he wrote Alroy

Alroy then has a succession of military successes with Jabaster, Scherirah and the prophetess Esther amongst his leading followers. He marches on Baghdad and meets a delegation from the city headed by Honain who offers to surrender if he is benevolent. Against Esther's advice, Alroy accepts and, once in Baghdad, he meets Schirene, who is being harboured by Honain. Alroy and Schirene marry in an extravagant wedding which is resented by one of his generals, Abidan, and Esther who persuade Jabaster to launch a coup on account of Alroy's marrying a Moslem and not building sufficient temples or marching on Jerusalem. The attempted coup fails; Esther is killed, but Abidan escapes. Jabaster is imprisoned and appears to commit suicide shortly afterwards.

Soon after Alroy learns that Abidan has linked up with a Persian sultan and is reconquering his lands. On the eve of setting out at the head of his army, a number of bad omens occur including the disappearance of Solomon's sceptre. Alroy's army camp at Nebeuard and, expecting the imminent aid of Scherirah's army, realise they will need to fight the following day. That evening Alroy hears from a dying soldier who has saved his life in an ambush that Honain and Schirene killed Jabaster.

Hopelessly outnumbered, Alroy's army fights bravely but when Scherirah's army eventually arrive, it turns out they have switched allegiance. Alroy flees with Schirene but they are captured a few days later in a surprise night-time attack.

A prisoner in Baghdad, Alroy learns that Honain has negotiated a settlement such that Miriam is safe and that he could be banished with Schirene if he were to confess that he is an instrument of the devil and used sorcery to seduce her. Alroy refuses, so Honain arranges for Miriam to try to convince him. She fails and dies broken-hearted shortly afterwards. Alroy is then subjected to a show trial but refuses to admit he is in cahoots with the devil even though various witnesses including, to his dismay, Schirene testify that he is. The novel ends with Alroy being beheaded by the King of Karasmé but retaining a derisory smile on his face.

== Critical and popular reception ==
Alroy was reasonably profitable for its author, who received a £300 advance from its publishers enabling him to pay off a debt to his father's landlord.

Nevertheless reviews of the novel are mainly damning. Disraeli himself said that the first chapter made as much sense if read backwards and his biographer Robert Blake writes, "Most modern critics would attribute no [credit] whatever to Alroy which is written in a deplorable sort of poetry-prose and is perhaps the most unreadable of his romances".

Charles C. Nickerson, in describing Alroy as an interesting failure as a novel, says it is "full of the most appalling rant" and "some engaging implausibilities", and has "a strain of resolute and humourless extravagance".

Eli Kavon however is complimentary of the novel, saying that Disraeli "rediscovered the legend and gave it new life as an inspiring and romantic proto-Zionist saga of a man who would fire the imagination of a people".

== Significance ==
For students of politics, Alroy is significant both for the fact that it portrays its author’s "ideal ambition" and for it being the only novel by Disraeli, born a Jew and then baptised into the Church of England, with a "distinctive Hebrew subject". In considering the "obscure" meaning of this ambition to be a "Jewish hero blessed, like Disraeli, with a devoted sister," Philip Guedalla, in the introduction to the 1927 Bradenham edition of the novel, surmises that, "it is not easy to believe that [Disraeli] ever played, even in fancy, with the notion of a Jewish career...and, possibly judicious, kept his ideal ambition strictly segregated from his real."
