= Bebadi =

- Village
- Location in Iraq Bebadi (Iraqi Kurdistan)
- Country: Iraq
- Region: Kurdistan Region
- Governorate: Dohuk Governorate
- District: Amadiya District
- Sub-district: Bamarni

Bebadi (Note: Alternatively transliterated as Bebada, Bebede, Bebad, or Bet-Baidey.) (Syriac: ܒܝܬܒܝܕܥ, romanized: Beth Bede, Kurdish: بێباد, romanized: Bêbadê) is a village in Dohuk Governorate in Kurdistan Region, Iraq. It is located in the Sapna valley in the district of Amadiya.

In the village, there is a church of Mart Shmune.

== History ==
The church of Mart Shmune was first constructed in the 6th century. A Nestorian community at Bebadi is attested in the 10th-century Life of Rabban Joseph Busnaya. The village was visited by the British archaeologist Austen Henry Layard in the late 1840s. In 1850, 20 Nestorian families inhabited Bebadi, and had one priest and one functioning church as part of the diocese of Berwari. The Anglican missionary William Ainger Wigram established a school in the village in 1908. A number of villagers had converted to Chaldean Catholicism by 1913.

The village was the residence of Shimun XXI Eshai, Patriarch of the Church of the East, after his relocation from Quchanis in Turkey in 1927, to his exile to Cyprus in 1933, in which year 250 Assyrians inhabited Bebadi, according to a report by the League of Nations. By 1938, the population had dropped to 36 people, with 10 families, but rose to 480 people by the time of the Iraqi census of 1957. Bebadi was destroyed by Zebari Kurds during the First Iraqi–Kurdish War in 1961, and its population of 100 families was forced to flee. The village was partially restored when some villagers returned in 1963, but was destroyed again during the Al-Anfal campaign in 1987, displacing 75 families.

30 families returned after the establishment of the Iraqi no-fly zones in the aftermath of the 1991 uprisings in Iraq. By 2011, the Supreme Committee of Christian Affairs had constructed 43 houses and a hall, and developed the village's infrastructure.

== Notable people ==
- Shlimon Bet Shmuel (b. 1950), Assyrian singer

== Gallery ==
The village school

== Bibliography ==
- Donabed, Sargon George (2010). Iraq and the Assyrian Unimagining: Illuminating Scaled Suffering and a Hierarchy of Genocide from Simele to Anfal (PDF).
- Donabed, Sargon George (2015). Reforging a Forgotten History: Iraq and the Assyrians in the Twentieth Century. Edinburgh University Press.
- Eshoo, Majed (2004). The Fate Of Assyrian Villages Annexed To Today's Dohuk Governorate In Iraq And The Conditions In These Villages Following The Establishment Of The Iraqi State In 1921 (PDF). Translated by Mary Challita.
- Khan, Geoffrey (2008). The Neo-Aramaic Dialect of Barwar. Brill.
- KRSO (2009), "2009 - ناوی پاریزگا. يه که کارگيرييه كانی پاریزگاكانی هه ریمی کوردستان" (PDF), Kurdistan Region Statistics Office (KRSO) (in Kurdish), pp. 1–179
- Layard, Austen Henry (1849). Nineveh and Its Remains: With an Account of a Visit to the Chaldaean Christians of Kurdistan, and the Yezidis, Or Devil-worshippers, and an Enquiry Into the Manners and Arts of the Ancient Assyrians. Vol. 1. John Murray.
- Wilmshurst, David (2000). The Ecclesiastical Organisation of the Church of the East, 1318–1913. Peeters Publishers.
