= Kani Balavi =

- Village
- Location in Iraq Kani Balavi (Iraqi Kurdistan)
- Coordinates: 37°10′41.4″N 43°11′07.3″E
- Country: Iraq
- Region: Kurdistan Region
- Governorate: Dohuk Governorate
- District: Amadiya District
- Sub-district: Bamarni

Kani Balavi is a village in Duhok Governorate in Kurdistan Region, Iraq. It is located in the district of Amadiya and the historical region of Barwari Bala. (Note: (Arabic: كاني بلافي; or كاني بلاف; Kurdish: کانی به‌لاڤ; Syriac: ܟܢܝ ܒܠܦ̮). Alternatively transliterated as Kani Bilaveh, Kani Balaf, Kanya Balave, Kani Balav, or Kani Balave.)

In the village, there is a church of Mart Maryam.

== History ==
Kani Balavi was inhabited by 20-30 Assyrian families in 1850. After the Assyrian genocide in the First World War, Assyrian refugees from Ashitha in Turkey settled at Kani Balavi, and the village had a population of 110 people by 1933, in which year it was looted and burned by the Iraqi army during the Simele massacre. In 1938, 20 families populated Kani Balavi. The village had a small Jewish community of several families until their departure in 1949.

The population increased to 190 Assyrians by the Iraqi census of 1957, and in 1961, there were 70 families in 35 houses. The village's population temporarily fled and took refuge elsewhere during the First Iraqi–Kurdish War in the 1960s, and later returned. Kani Balavi was destroyed by the Iraqi army, and its population forcibly expelled, during the Al-Anfal campaign in 1988.

15 Assyrian families returned and rebuilt Kani Balavi, but it was reported that Kurds from neighbouring villages had illegally seized the village's water sources and constructed houses on villagers' land in 1992. In early 2009, 72 displaced Assyrians, with 19 families, resided at Kani Balavi. By 2011, the Supreme Committee of Christian Affairs had constructed 39 houses, a church, and community hall, and developed the village's infrastructure.

In 2012, it was estimated that 15 Assyrians, all adherents of the Assyrian Church of the East, inhabited Kani Balavi. In August 2014, the Assyrian Church of the East Relief Organisation reported there were 45 displaced Assyrian families in the village, and the Assyrian Aid Society provided humanitarian aid in November. As of 2021, 29 Assyrians inhabit Kani Balavi.

== Bibliography ==
- Donabed, Sargon George (2010). Iraq and the Assyrian Unimagining: Illuminating Scaled Suffering and a Hierarchy of Genocide from Simele to Anfal (PDF).
- Donabed, Sargon George (2015). Reforging a Forgotten History: Iraq and the Assyrians in the Twentieth Century. Edinburgh University Press.
- Eshoo, Majed (2004). The Fate Of Assyrian Villages Annexed To Today's Dohuk Governorate In Iraq And The Conditions In These Villages Following The Establishment Of The Iraqi State In 1921 (PDF). Translated by Mary Challita.
- KRSO (2009), "2009 - ناوی پاریزگا. يه که کارگيرييه كانی پاریزگاكانی هه ریمی کوردستان" (PDF), Kurdistan Region Statistics Office (KRSO) (in Kurdish), pp. 1–179
