= Badarash =

- Village

- Location in Iraq Badarash (Iraqi Kurdistan)
- Coordinates: 37°03′N 43°20′E
- Country: Iraq
- Region: Kurdistan Region
- Governorate: Dohuk Governorate
- District: Amadiya District
- Sub-district: Sarsing

Badarash (Note: Alternatively transliterated as Badaresh, Badrash, Badrashk, Badarrash, Beth Darrash, or Beth Durashe.) (Syriac: ܒܕܪܫ) is a village in Dohuk Governorate in Kurdistan Region, Iraq. It is located in the Sapna valley in the district of Amadiya.

In the village, there is a Chaldean Catholic church of Mar Gewargis.

== History ==
After the Assyrian genocide in the First World War, Badarash was settled by Assyrian refugees of the Baz clan from modern-day Turkey in the 1920s, all of whom belonged either to the Church of the East or the Chaldean Catholic Church. The church of Mar Gewargis was constructed in 1925, and by 1938, 152 people inhabited the village, with 27 families. Badarash was destroyed and its population expelled by the Iraqi government at the onset of the First Iraqi–Kurdish War in 1961, prior to which the village had 30 houses. Villagers later returned, but Badarash was destroyed again during the Al-Anfal campaign in 1987.

The village was rebuilt again, and the population of the village reached 40 families by 2004. Violence against Assyrians in urban centres of Iraq led 102 displaced Assyrians, with 27 families, to seek refuge in Badarash by early 2009. By 2012 the Supreme Committee of Christian Affairs had constructed 48 houses and a community hall. Humanitarian aid was delivered to Badarash by the Assyrian Aid Society in May 2015. The village's graveyard was renovated by the French non-governmental organisation SOS Chrétiens d'Orient in 2018.

In May 2022, a group of Kurdish men from the Kurdistan Democratic Party came back to the village and began to place fences, and claimed the land belonged to them. The Assyrians resisted them and attempted to obstruct them from raising the wall, claiming that it was their land. This incident transpired in a confrontation between the two groups, where the police arrested two Assyrians who were filming the incident and the Kurdish group involved in the altercation. Although the incident was a minor one, it created an emotional reaction among Assyrians worldwide on social media. The CSW condemned the Kurdistan Regional Government after the incident.

== Gallery ==
Church of Mar Gewargis

A house in Badarash

== Bibliography ==
- Donabed, Sargon George (2010). Iraq and the Assyrian Unimagining: Illuminating Scaled Suffering and a Hierarchy of Genocide from Simele to Anfal (PDF).
- Donabed, Sargon George (2015). Reforging a Forgotten History: Iraq and the Assyrians in the Twentieth Century. Edinburgh University Press.
- Eshoo, Majed (2004). The Fate Of Assyrian Villages Annexed To Today's Dohuk Governorate In Iraq And The Conditions In These Villages Following The Establishment Of The Iraqi State In 1921 (PDF). Translated by Mary Challita.
