= Dehi, Iraq =

Dehi
- Village
- Location in Iraq Dehi (Iraqi Kurdistan)
- Coordinates: 37.134074°N 43.178976°E
- Country: Iraq
- Region: Kurdistan Region
- Governorate: Dohuk Governorate
- District: Amadiya District
- Sub-district: Sarsing

Dehi (Syriac: ܕܗܐ (Note: Alternatively transliterated as Deha, Dihe, or Dehe.), Kurdish: دیێ,) is a village in Dohuk Governorate in Kurdistan Region, Iraq. It is located in the Sapna valley in the district of Amadiya.

In the village, there are churches of Mart Shmune, Mar Gewargis, and Mar Qayouma.

== History ==
The church of Mart Shmune was constructed in the 5th century, and the church of Mar Qayouma was built in the 10th century. It is likely that the population of Dehi were adherents of the Church of the East long before the 14th century. In 1850, 10 Assyrian families inhabited Dehi, and had one functioning church as part of the diocese of Barwari.

In the aftermath of the Assyrian genocide, Assyrians from the Upper Tyari clan found refuge and settled at Dehi in 1920. The population decreased from 140 Assyrian people in 1933 to 29 people in 1938. The Iraqi census of 1957 recorded 292 inhabitants, and this grew to 615 people, with 100 families, by 1961. The eruption of the Iraqi–Kurdish conflict in 1961 resulted in severe damage to the village in the following years, and eventually was destroyed during the Al-Anfal campaign in 1988, forcing the 50 remaining families to flee.

20 families returned after the establishment of the Iraqi no-fly zones in the aftermath of the 1991 uprisings in Iraq. In 2003, it was reported they had suffered from illegal confiscation of land by Kurds. The Supreme Committee of Christian Affairs had constructed 56 houses and developed the village's infrastructure by 2012, in which year Dehi was inhabited by 250 adherents of the Assyrian Church of the East. On the night of 13 July 2016, the village was seriously damaged by a fire; it was noted by villagers that Kurdistan Region firefighters arrived, but made no effort to quench the fire.

== Gallery ==
A photo of the village

== Bibliography ==
- Donabed, Sargon George (2010). Iraq and the Assyrian Unimagining: Illuminating Scaled Suffering and a Hierarchy of Genocide from Simele to Anfal (PDF).
- Donabed, Sargon George (2015). Reforging a Forgotten History: Iraq and the Assyrians in the Twentieth Century. Edinburgh University Press.
- Eshoo, Majed (2004). The Fate Of Assyrian Villages Annexed To Today's Dohuk Governorate In Iraq And The Conditions In These Villages Following The Establishment Of The Iraqi State In 1921 (PDF). Translated by Mary Challita.
- Hanna, Reine; Barber, Matthew (2017). Erasing Assyrians: How the KRG Abuses Human Rights, Undermines Democracy, and Conquers Minority Homelands (PDF). Assyrian Confederation of Europe.
- Khan, Geoffrey (2008). The Neo-Aramaic Dialect of Barwar. Brill.
- Wilmshurst, David (2000). The Ecclesiastical Organisation of the Church of the East, 1318–1913. Peeters Publishers.
