= Bamarni Air Base =

Military airbase in Kurdistan region, Iraq

- IATA: BMN; ICAO: ORBB

Summary
- Airport type: Military
- Owner: Turkish Armed Forces
- Operator: Turkish Armed Forces Turkish Land Forces
- Serves: Bamarni
- Location: Bamarni, Duhok Governorate, Iraq
- Time zone: Arabia Standard Time (UTC+03:00)
- Elevation AMSL: 340 ft / 104 m

Map
- Location of airport in Iraq BMN (Iraqi Kurdistan)

Runways
Direction	Length		Surface
Direction	ft	m	Surface
			Asphalt

Bamarni Air Base is a military airport in Duhok Governorate in the Kurdistan Region of Iraq. It is located near Bamarni in Amadiya District.

== History ==
The airport was partially constructed near Bamarni for use by Saddam Hussein to visit his residence in the vicinity, and was then known as Sarsing airport. It was bombed in 1991 during the Gulf War, but was rebuilt soon after by the US 133rd Naval Mobile Construction Battalion as part of Operation Provide Comfort. The Turkish Armed Forces began to operate from the airfield in 1996, and established two bases at Bamarni as part of an agreement with the Kurdistan Democratic Party, during the Iraqi Kurdish Civil War.

The Turkish base's facilities were upgraded in 2006, and was the scene of a 90-minute standoff on 21 February 2008 after Turkish forces, consisting of approximately 350 soldiers in armoured vehicles and around 12 tanks, attempted to leave the base on deployment without prior notification to the Kurdistan Regional Government, and thus were blocked by the Peshmerga, causing the Turkish forces to return to base. It was reinforced with additional tanks and weapons in March 2015.

== Bibliography ==
- Jenkins, Gareth (2008). "Unwelcome Guests: The Turkish Military Bases in Northern Iraq". Terrorism Monitor. 6 (6).
