= Alikhan, Iraq =

Kurdish village in kurdistan

Alikhan ئالیخان
- Village
- Location in Iraq Alikhan (Iraqi Kurdistan)
- Coordinates: 37°11′36.8″N 43°28′58.5″E
- Country: Iraq
- Region: Kurdistan Region
- Governorate: Dohuk Governorate
- District: Amadiya District
- Sub-district: kani masi
- Founder: Alikhan (Alîxan)

Area
  - Total: 5.2 km^{2} (2.0 sq mi)

Alikhan (Kurdish: ئالیخان, romanized: Alîxan) is a village in the sub-district of Kani Masi in Dohuk Governorate in Kurdistan Region, Iraq. It is located north of Amedi near the southeastern Turkey border. The Village is inhabited by Kurds of the Deshtani (Deştan) Clan,

== Gallery ==
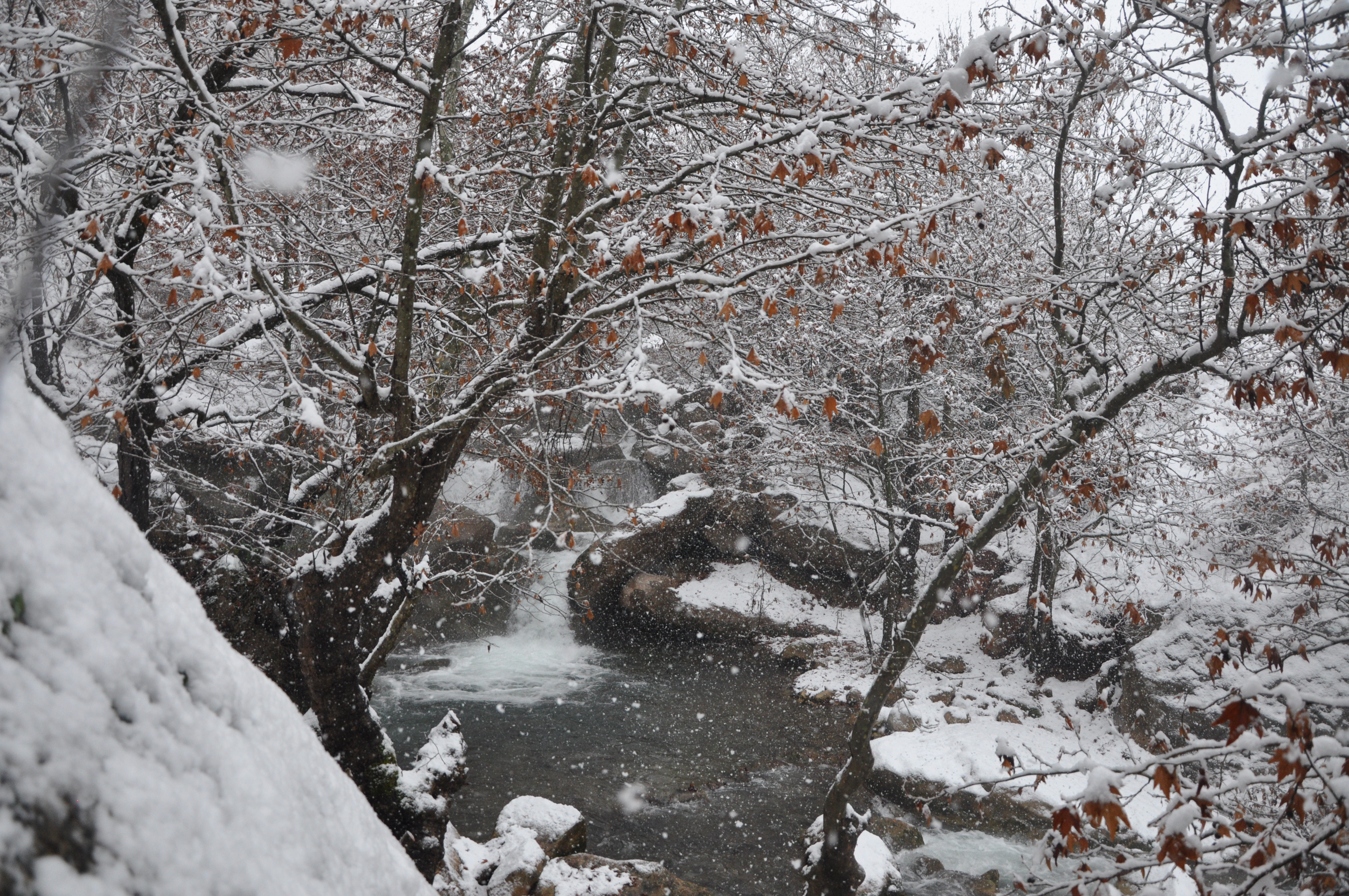

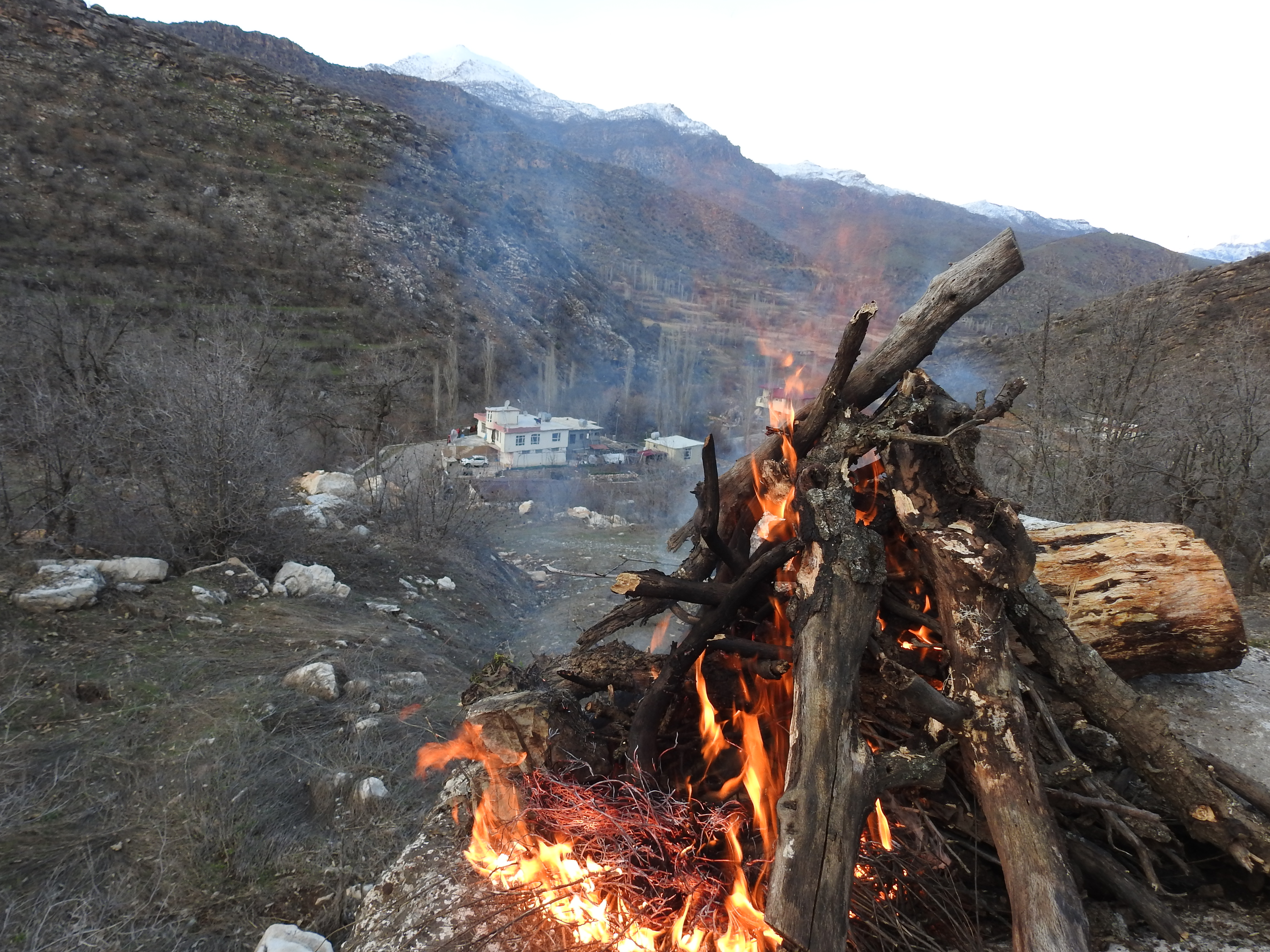

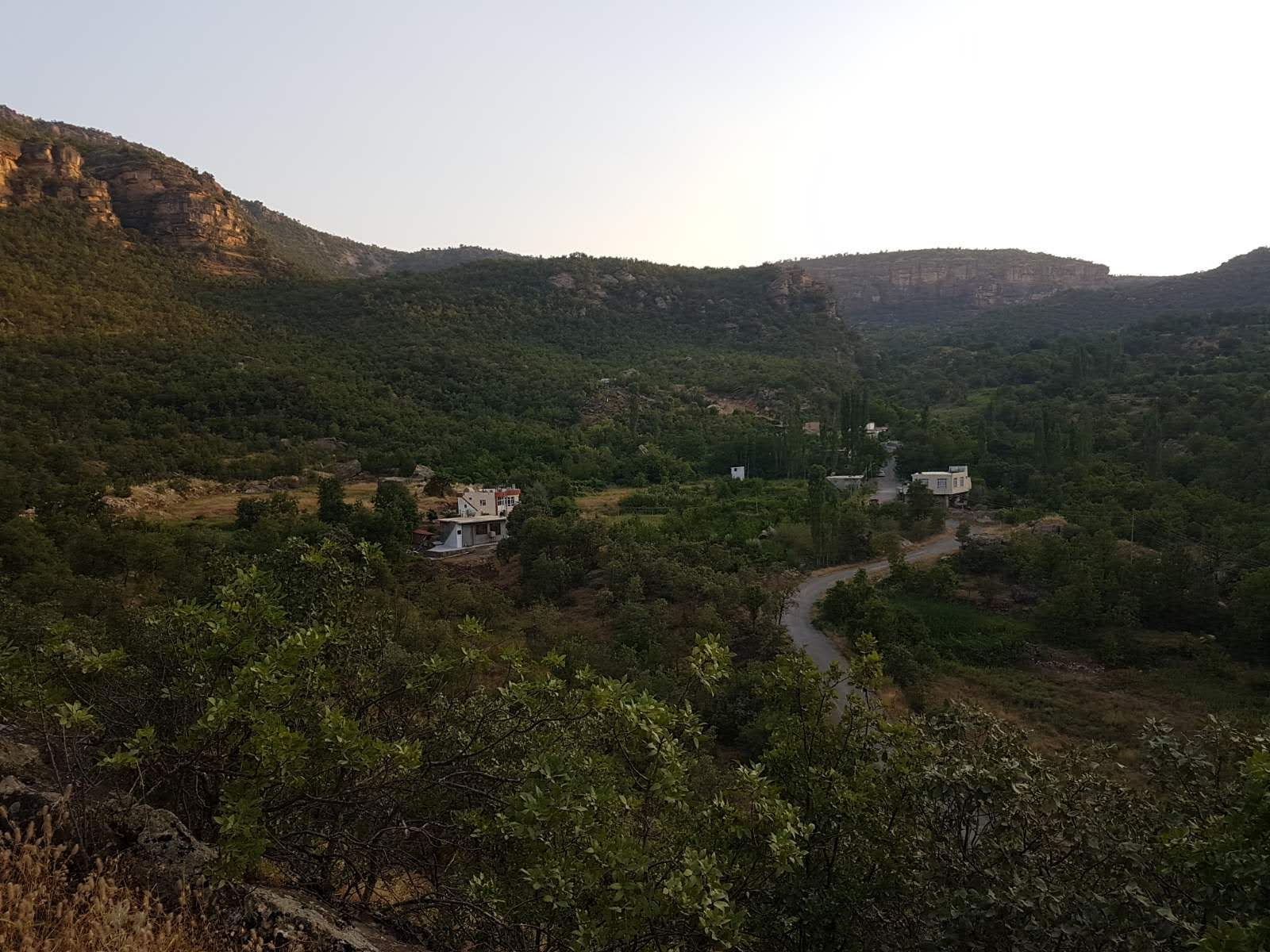
