= Hezany =

- Village
- Location in Iraq Hezany (Iraqi Kurdistan)
- Coordinates: Lower Hezany (Hezany Khtetha); 36.86134°N 43.6847°E; Upper Hezany (Hezany Eletha); 36.86701°N 43.68849°E
- Country: Iraq
- Region: Kurdistan Region
- Governorate: Dohuk Governorate
- District: Amadiya District
- Sub-district: Chamanke

Hezany (Kurdish: هیزانکێ, romanized: Hêzankê, Syriac: ܗܝܙܢܐ) (Note: Alternatively transliterated as Hizaneh, Hezaneh, Hazane, Hizanke, or Hizane.) is a village in Dohuk Governorate in Kurdistan Region, Iraq. It is located in the Nahla valley in the Amadiya District.

In the village, there is a church of Mar Gewargis of the Ancient Church of the East.

== History ==
After the Assyrian genocide in the First World War, Hezany was resettled by Assyrians from Lower Tyari in 1920, all of whom were adherents of the Church of the East. The village was divided into Hezany Eletha (upper Hezany) and Hezany Khtetha (lower Hezany). In 1938, lower Hezany was inhabited by 25 people, with 5 families, and upper Hezany had a population of 155, with 28 families, for a total of 180 people, and 33 families. The population of lower Hezany grew to 210, whereas upper Hezany decreased to 44 by the Iraqi census of 1957, for a total of 254 people.

At the onset of the First Iraqi–Kurdish War in 1961, 100 families in 42 houses inhabited the village. During the war, neighbouring Kurds illegally seized 60 dunams of agricultural land, and Hezany was razed by government irregulars in 1964 and 1969. The population subsequently decreased in lower Hezany to 145, and to 20 people in upper Hezany, for a total of 165 people by 1977. The village was destroyed by the Iraqi government in 1987 during the Al-Anfal campaign, displacing the remaining 110 families.

Hezany was rebuilt and repopulated by 50 families in the aftermath of the 1991 uprisings in Iraq. Although wholly populated by Assyrians, the Kurdistan Regional Government officially imposed the Kurdish name Hezanke on the village. Villagers reported they had suffered from illegal land expropriation by Kurds in 1994 and 1997. A blockade imposed by Kurdistan Democratic Party militants on Hezany and seven other Assyrian villages in the valley in August 1999 by prohibiting the movement of food into the village, which was dependent on food from Akre, was lifted after the intervention of the United Nations and International Committee of the Red Cross.

In early 2009, 29 displaced Assyrians, with 10 families, inhabited the village. As of 2010, upper Hezany is completely uninhabited and lower Hezany partially uninhabited, despite the construction of houses by the Kurdistan Regional Government, due to the lack of infrastructure and poor economic opportunities. Irrigation channels in the village were restored by the Assyrian Aid Society in May 2013. As of 2021, 153 Assyrians inhabit Hezany.

== Gallery ==
Church of Mar Gewargis

A farm in Hezany

== See also ==
- Assyrians in Iraq
- List of Assyrian settlements

== Bibliography ==
- Bennett, Byard J. (2016). "Ancient Church of the East". In George Thomas Kurian; Mark A. Lamport (eds.). Encyclopedia of Christianity in the United States. Vol. 5. Rowman & Littlefield. pp. 85–86.
- Donabed, Sargon George (2010). Iraq and the Assyrian Unimagining: Illuminating Scaled Suffering and a Hierarchy of Genocide from Simele to Anfal (PDF).
- Donabed, Sargon George (2015). Reforging a Forgotten History: Iraq and the Assyrians in the Twentieth Century. Edinburgh University Press.
- Eshoo, Majed (2004). The Fate Of Assyrian Villages Annexed To Today's Dohuk Governorate In Iraq And The Conditions In These Villages Following The Establishment Of The Iraqi State In 1921 (PDF). Translated by Mary Challita.
- KRSO (2009), "2009 - ناوی پاریزگا. يه که کارگيرييه كانی پاریزگاكانی هه ریمی کوردستان" (PDF), Kurdistan Region Statistics Office (KRSO) (in Kurdish), pp. 1–179, archived from the original (PDF) on 14 March 2017
