= Dawodiya =

- Location in Iraq Dawodiya (Iraqi Kurdistan)
- Coordinates: 37.089151°N 43.220261°E
- Country: Iraq
- Region: Kurdistan Region
- Governorate: Dohuk Governorate
- District: Amedi District

Dawodiya is a village in Dohuk Governorate in Kurdistan Region, Iraq. (Note: Alternatively transliterated as Daoodia, Daoudiya, Dawudiya, Dawudiyah, Dawudeya, Dawudye, Daūdīyā, or Daudiya.) It is located in the Sapna valley in Amedi District.

== Etymology ==
The name of Dawodiya is believed to be derive from the Monastery of Mar Daudo, located north of the village.

== History ==
The village is built atop an archaeological mound dating to the fifth century BC. The Church of Mar Youḥannan at Dawodiya was constructed in the seventeenth century. The village was devastated in a Kurdish raid in 1712. The village's population was converted from the Church of the East to the Chaldean Catholic Church in the 1830s as a result of the influence of Dominican missionaries and Joseph Audo, metropolitan of Amedi. A military barracks was built at the village in 1840. By 1850, there were 30-45 Chaldean Catholic families at Dawodiya with no priests or churches as part of the Diocese of Amadiya. In 1913, the village was inhabited by 300 Chaldean Catholics, who were served by one priest, one church, and one school.

After the Simele massacre in 1933, Dawodiya was inhabited by 275 Assyrians, according to a report by the League of Nations. It was populated by 524 people in 80 households in 1957. By 1961, there were 150 families in 120 households at Dawodiya. The village, including a school and the Church of Mar Youḥannan, was destroyed in 1987 and its population of 82 families was dispersed. During the Anfal campaign, the shrine of Mart Shmuni at Dawodiya was damaged and five adults from the village disappeared from August to September 1988. Fifteen families returned after the 1991 Iraqi uprisings whilst the other families inhabited other parts of Iraq or had joined the diaspora. In early 2009, there were 153 internally displaced Assyrians in 43 families at Dawodiya. In 2012, 320 Chaldean Catholics and 150 adherents of the Assyrian Church of the East inhabited Dawodiya.

== Bibliography ==
- Badger, George Percy (1852). The Nestorians and Their Rituals: With the Narrative of a Mission to Mesopotamia and Coordistan in 1842-1844, and of a Late Visit to Those Countries in 1850; Also, Researches Into the Present Condition of the Syrian Jacobites, Papal Syrians, and Chaldeans, and an Inquiry Into the Religious Tenets of the Yezeedees. Vol. 1.
- Donabed, Sargon George (2015). Reforging a Forgotten History: Iraq and the Assyrians in the Twentieth Century. Edinburgh University Press.
- Eshoo, Majed (2004). The Fate Of Assyrian Villages Annexed To Today's Dohuk Governorate In Iraq And The Conditions In These Villages Following The Establishment Of The Iraqi State In 1921 (PDF). Translated by Mary Challita.
- Wilmshurst, David (2000). The Ecclesiastical Organisation of the Church of the East, 1318–1913 (PDF). Peeters Publishers.
