= Deraluk =

Town in Iraq

- Town
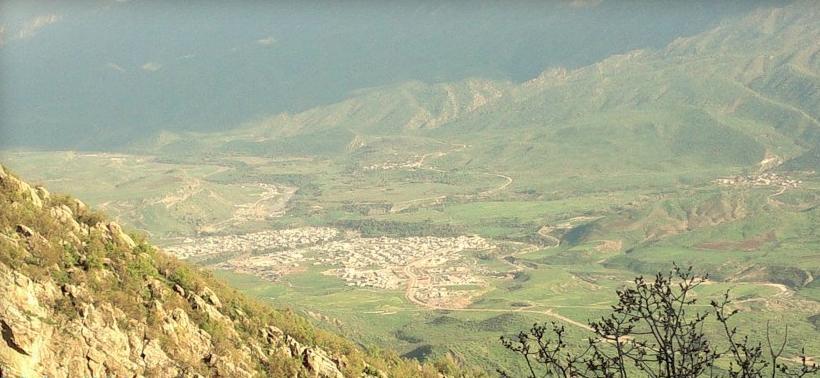

- Location in Iraq Deraluk (Iraqi Kurdistan)
- Coordinates: 37.05598°N 43.65188°E
- Country: Iraq
- Region: Kurdistan Region
- Governorate: Dohuk Governorate
- District: Amadiya District
- Sub-district: Deraluk

Population (2014)
  - Urban: 44,448
  - Rural: 7,070

Deraluk (Arabic: ديرلوك, Kurdish: دێرەلووک, romanized: Dêrelûk, Syriac: Deira d-Luqa) is a town and subdistrict in Dohuk Governorate in Kurdistan Region, Iraq. It is located on the Great Zab and in the district of Amadiya.

In the town, there are churches of Mar Khnana and Mar Gewargis.

== Etymology ==
The name of the town is derived from "deira" ("monastery/church" in Syriac) and "Luqa" ("Luke" in Syriac), and thus Deraluk translates to "monastery or church of Saint Luke".

== History ==
In 1920, Deraluk was settled by Assyrians of the Baz clan after their expulsion from the region of Hakkari in Turkey. It was named after a ruined monastery of Saint Luke in the vicinity. Prior to the Simele massacre in 1933, Deraluk was inhabited by 130 Assyrians, many of whom were forced to flee the violence and settled along the River Khabur in Syria.

Deraluk was made a mujamma (collective town) by the Iraqi government in 1978 and settled by displaced Assyrians from Nerwa and Rekan along the Iraq–Turkey border. Forty-five houses were constructed for the thirty households that came from Qārō, five households from Lower Nerwa, five households from Derigni, and five households from Wela. In the following year, a church of Mar Khnana was constructed.

It was used as a mujamma again in 1987–1988 during the Anfal campaign. At Deraluk, Kurdistan Democratic Party guerrillas seized documents pertaining to the use of biological and chemical weapons by the Iraqi Armed Forces during the Iran-Iraq War in January 1988.

On 5 December 2011, amidst the 2011 Duhok riots, alcohol shops were targeted by rioters and four were set alight and two others were ransacked. In 2012, an estimated 525 Assyrians inhabited Deraluk. Humanitarian aid was delivered to 72 displaced families from Mosul and the Nineveh Plains by the Assyrian Aid Society in January 2015. As of 2023, approximately 100 Assyrians, comprising 40 families, all adherents of the Assyrian Church of the East, reside in Deraluk.

== Gallery ==
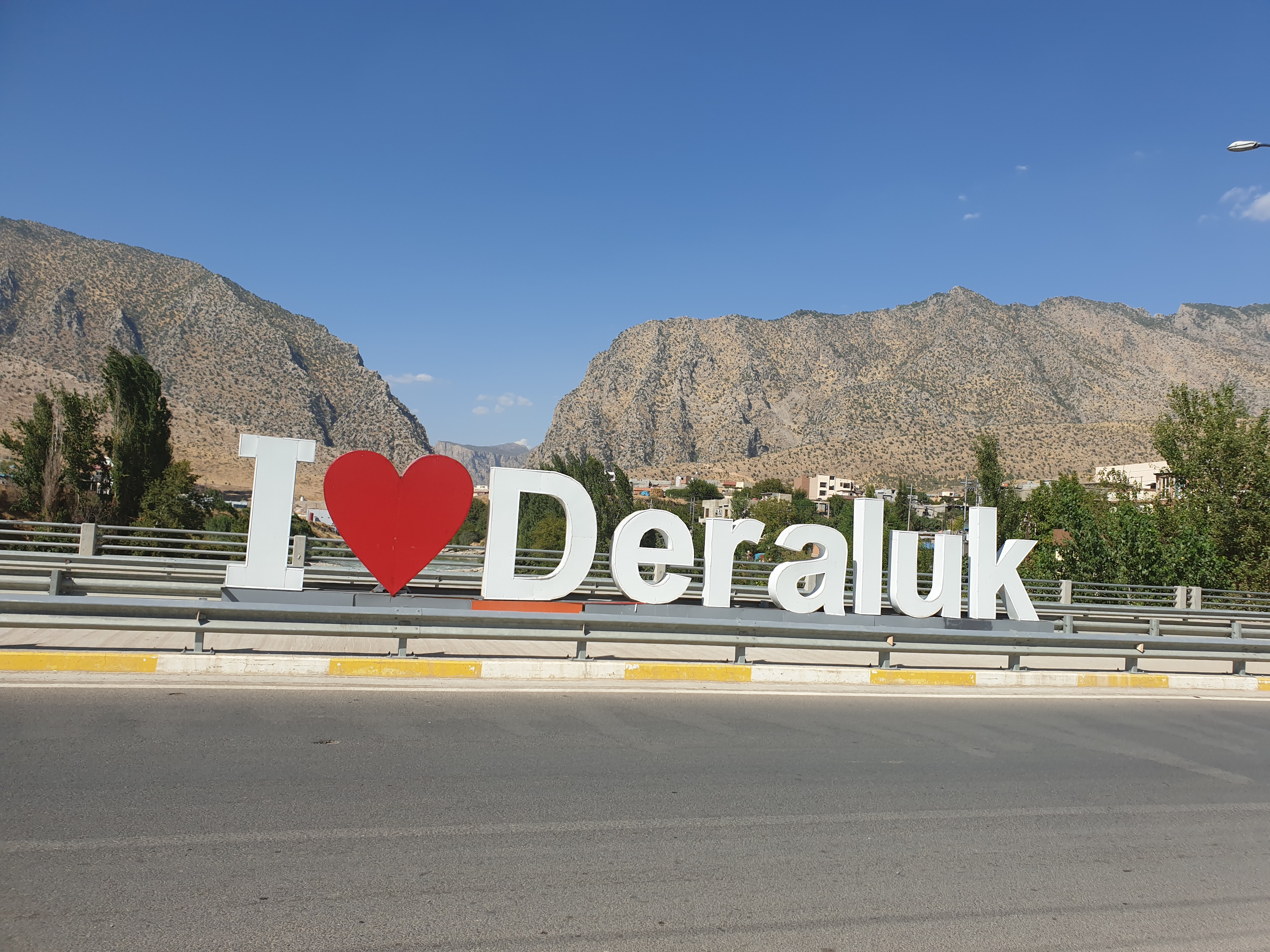

== Bibliography ==
- Donabed, Sargon George (2015). Reforging a Forgotten History: Iraq and the Assyrians in the Twentieth Century. Edinburgh University Press.
- Hiro, Dilip (1991). The Longest War: The Iran-Iraq Military Conflict. Psychology Press.
