= List of governors of Duhok =

Elected heads of Province of Duhok, Iraq

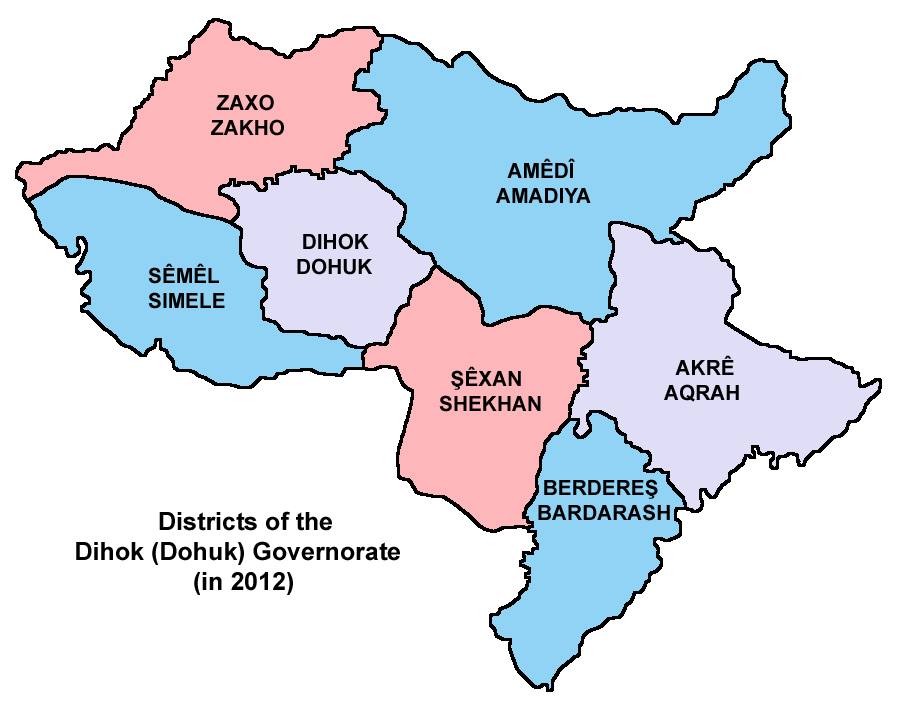
A map of the Duhok

Location of the Duhok Governorate (red) in Iraq

The Governor of Duhok is the elected head of the Province of Duhok, Iraq. The post was established by President Ahmed Hassan al-Bakr in 1969.

Person	Time as governor
Ageed Sediq Sedullah Amedi	1969–1970
Muhamed resol goyi	1970–1970
Hashim hesen Akreyi	1970–1973
Suaad Hebib Talebani	1974
Muhamed Ali Ameen Goran	1974–1976
Yehya Muhamed Reshid J	1976–1979
Namiq Reqib Sorci	1979–1988
Muhamed Piro rostem	1988-1991
Abdulwehab Atroshi	1991
Abdulaziz Teyib	1992–1999
Necirvan Ahmed	1999–2005
Temer Remezan	2005–2014
Ferhad Ameen Atrushi	2014–2020
Ali Tatar	2020–
