= Armash =

Armash may refer to the following towns and settlements:

- For the town and former spiritual center of Armenians in Western Asia Minor, see Armash, Ottoman Empire
- For the place in Armenia, see Armash, Armenia
- For the largely Assyrian-populated village in Iraq, see Armash, Iraq
