= Kani Masi =

Village in Iraq

- Village
- Location in Iraq Kani Masi (Iraqi Kurdistan)
- Coordinates: 37°13′40″N 43°26′14″E
- Country: Iraq
- Region: Kurdistan Region
- Governorate: Dohuk Governorate
- District: Amadiya District
- Sub-district: Kani Masi

Population (2014)
  - Urban: 1,062
  - Rural: 9,155

Kani Masi (Arabic: كاني ماسي, Kurdish: کانی ماسێ, romanized: Kanî Masê) (Note: Alternatively transliterated as Kanimase, or Kane Masa.) or Ain Nuni (Arabic: عينا دنونى, Syriac: ܥܝܢܢܘ̈ܢܐ) (Note: Alternatively transliterated as Ayn-Nune, Aina D Nouneh, Annūnē, or 'Aïnā d'Nūne.) is a village and sub-district in Dohuk Governorate in Kurdistan Region, Iraq. It is located in the district of Amadiya and the historical region of Barwari Bala.

In the village, there are churches of Mar Sawa and Mart Shmuni.

== Etymology ==
The Syriac and Kurdish names of the village, Ain Nuni and Kani Masi, respectively, both translate to "spring of fish". Ain Nuni is derived from "ain" ("spring" in Syriac) and "nuni" ("fish" in Syriac), whilst Kani Masi is a combination of "kani" ("spring" in Kurdish) and "masi" ("fish" in Kurdish).

== History ==
Clay vessels dated to between 1415 and 1290 B.C were discovered during an archaeological survey in the area of Ain Nuni. The church of Mar Sawa was constructed in the 10th century, and underwent restorations in 1742. In 1850, 20 families inhabited Ain Nuni, all of whom were adherents of the Church of the East, and were served by one functioning church and one priest as part of the diocese of Berwari. Prior to the First World War, Ain Nuni was inhabited by approximately 350 Assyrians. The village was ransacked by Ottoman Turkish and Kurdish forces in the spring of 1915, amidst the Sayfo, but the villagers survived by fleeing under the leadership of Agha Petros to the vicinity of Urmia in Iran. In the winter of 1915-1916, whilst in Iran, 120 villagers died, roughly 20 were killed, and 10 women were abducted. The villagers eventually returned after seven years.

A school was constructed in 1928, and the village became the centre of a sub-district in 1934. 70 families populated Ain Nuni in 1938. Ain Nuni was inhabited by 420 Assyrians in 1957. At the onset of the First Iraqi–Kurdish War in 1961, Kurdish rebels led by Mustafa Barzani attacked the village and killed a bishop, two priests, and over 15 men. Assyrians from nearby villages repelled the Kurds, and the surviving villagers took refuge in larger towns, and returned at the war's end in 1970. KDP forces seized Ain Nuni from Iraqi National Defence Battalions in September 1987 during the Iran-Iraq War and occupied it for six days. On 27 February 1988, the village was destroyed and its population of 180 Assyrian families was forcibly evacuated by the Iraqi government during the Al-Anfal campaign. 20 families returned after the establishment of the Iraqi no-fly zones in the aftermath of the 1991 uprisings in Iraq, however, in the following year it was reported that Kurds from neighbouring villages had illegally seized 5000 m2 from the villagers of Ain Nuni.

The Turkish Armed Forces established a military base close to Ain Nuni in 1996 as part of the Kurdish-Turkish conflict. The Kurdistan Regional Government illegally confiscated 30,000 m2 from an Assyrian in the village in 2003 to construct an office for the Kurdistan Democratic Party (KDP), and the village was given the name Kani Masi as part of its policy of Kurdification. In early 2009, 23 displaced Assyrians, with 9 families, resided at Ain Nuni. The Supreme Committee of Christian Affairs constructed 58 houses, a church, and hall, and provided two electrical generators by 2011. It was reported that the church of Mar Sawa, built by the Supreme Committee of Christian Affairs, had been poorly constructed and its façade was at risk of collapsing. In 2012, the village was inhabited by 500 adherents of the Assyrian Church of the East. Ain Nuni was struck by Turkish airstrikes on 5 September 2018. Kurdistan Workers' Party (PKK) militants clashed with the Turkish army near Ain Nuni on 12 December 2018.

The village was shelled by Turkish artillery on 19 March 2019, and resulted in damage to three houses. Militants attacked the Turkish military base near the village on 19 March 2020, killing six Turkish soldiers, and injuring four others. As of 2021, 37 Assyrians in 8 families reside at Ain Nuni.

== Gallery ==
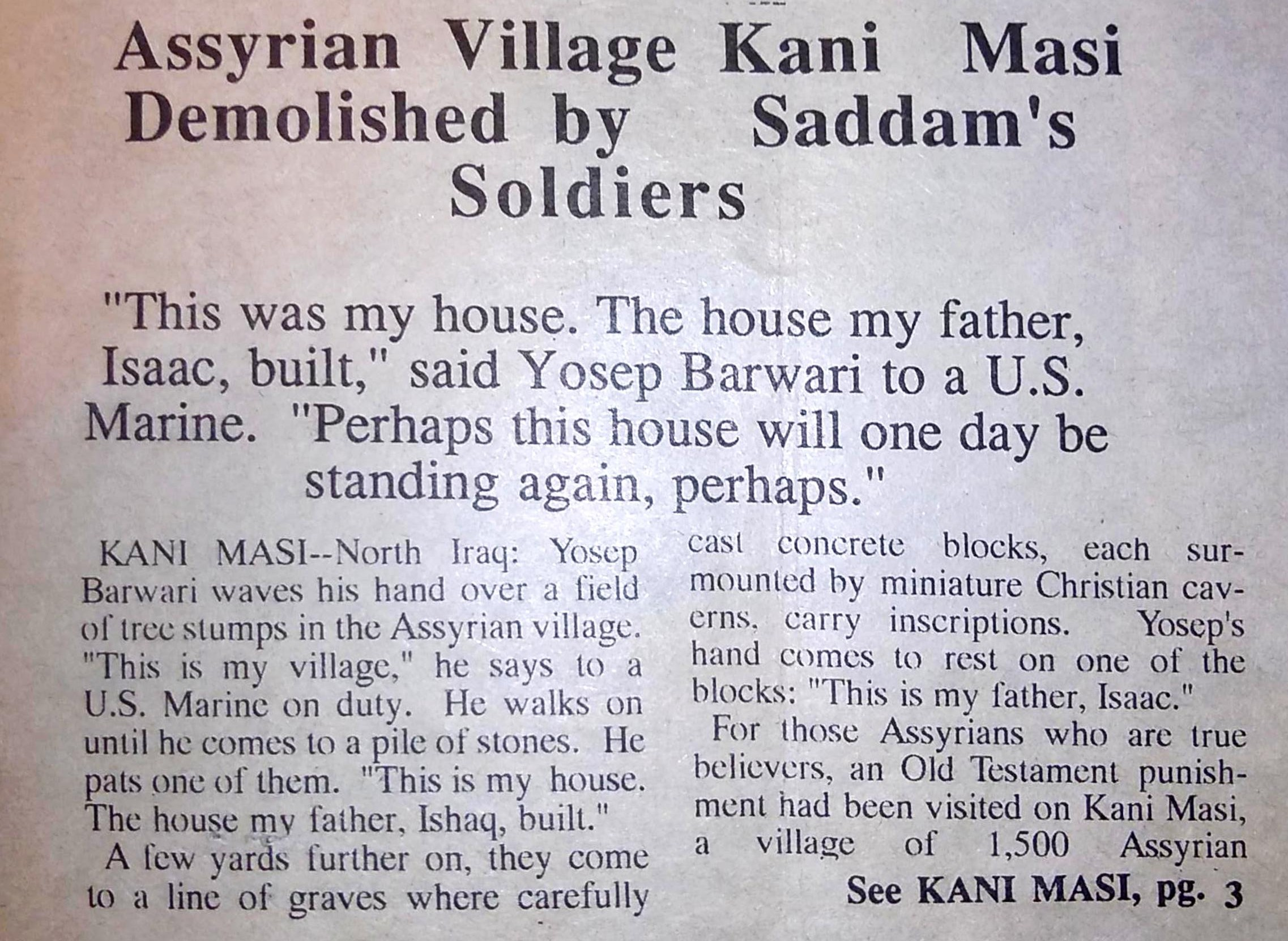
"Assyrian Village Kani Masi Demolished by Saddam's Soldiers". Assyrian Guardian. May 1992.

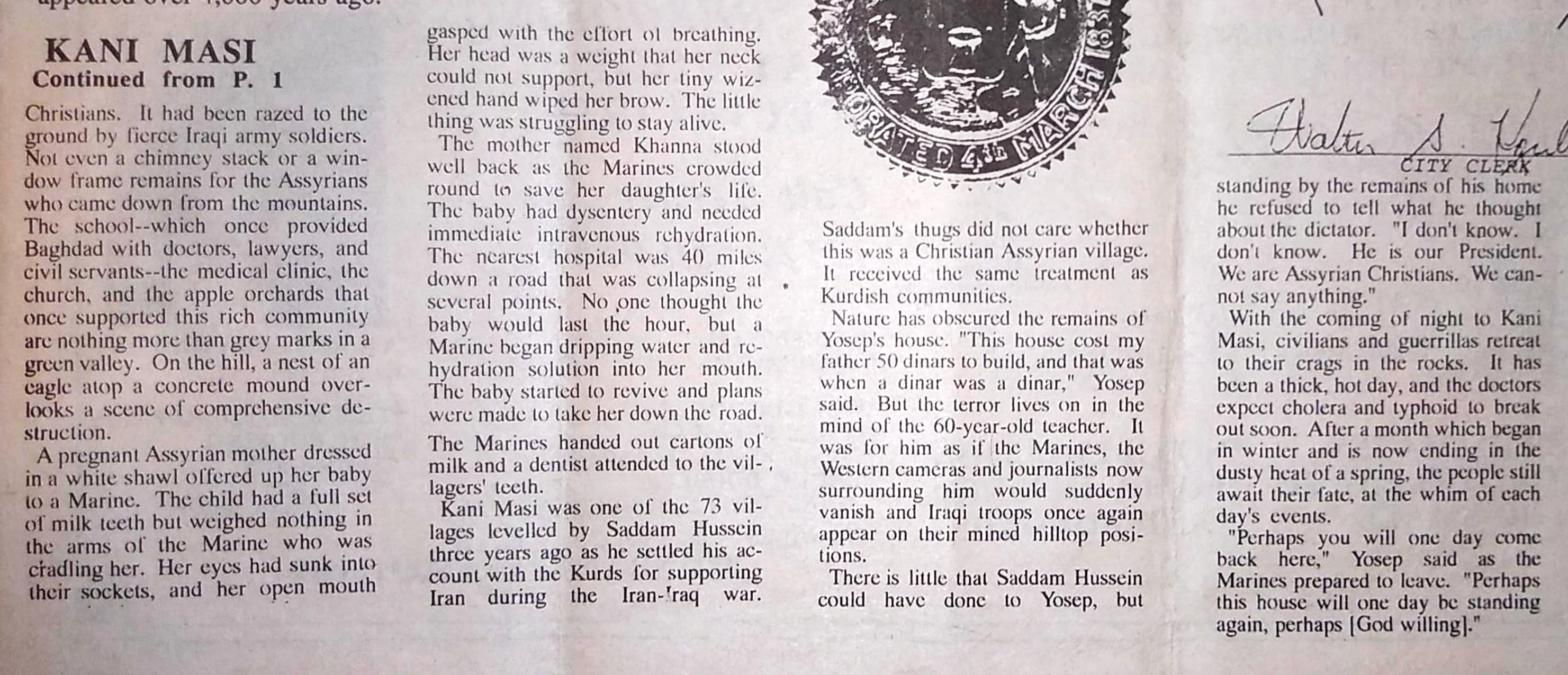
"Assyrian Village Kani Masi Demolished by Saddam's Soldiers". Assyrian Guardian. May 1992.

== See also ==
- Assyrians in Iraq
- List of Assyrian settlements
- Duhok Governorate

== Bibliography ==
- Awde, Nicholas; Lamassu, Nineb; Al-Jeloo, Nicholas (2007). Aramaic (Assyrian/Syriac) Dictionary & Phrasebook. Hippocrene Books.
- Black, George (July 1993). Genocide in Iraq: The Anfal Campaign Against the Kurds. Human Rights Watch. ISBN 9781564321084.
- Brauer, Erich (1993). The Jews of Kurdistan. Wayne State University Press.
- Donabed, Sargon George (2015). Reforging a Forgotten History: Iraq and the Assyrians in the Twentieth Century. Edinburgh University Press.
- Eshoo, Majed (2004). The Fate Of Assyrian Villages Annexed To Today's Dohuk Governorate In Iraq And The Conditions In These Villages Following The Establishment Of The Iraqi State In 1921 (PDF). Translated by Mary Challita.
- Gish, Peggy Faw (2013). Walking Through Fire: Iraqis' Struggle for Justice and Reconciliation. Wipf and Stock Publishers.
- Joseph, Isya (1972). Devil Worship: The Sacred Books and Traditions of the Yezidiz. Gorham Press.
- Khan, Geoffrey (2008). The Neo-Aramaic Dialect of Barwar. Brill.
- Malovany, Pesach (2017). Wars of Modern Babylon: A History of the Iraqi Army from 1921 to 2003. University Press of Kentucky.
- Wilmshurst, David (2000). The Ecclesiastical Organisation of the Church of the East, 1318–1913 (PDF). Peeters Publishers.
- Yacoub, Joseph (2016). Year of the Sword: The Assyrian Christian Genocide, A History. Translated by James Ferguson. Oxford University Press.
