= Kovli, Iraq =

Village in Kurdistan Region, Iraq

Kovli گوندێ کوڤلی
- Village
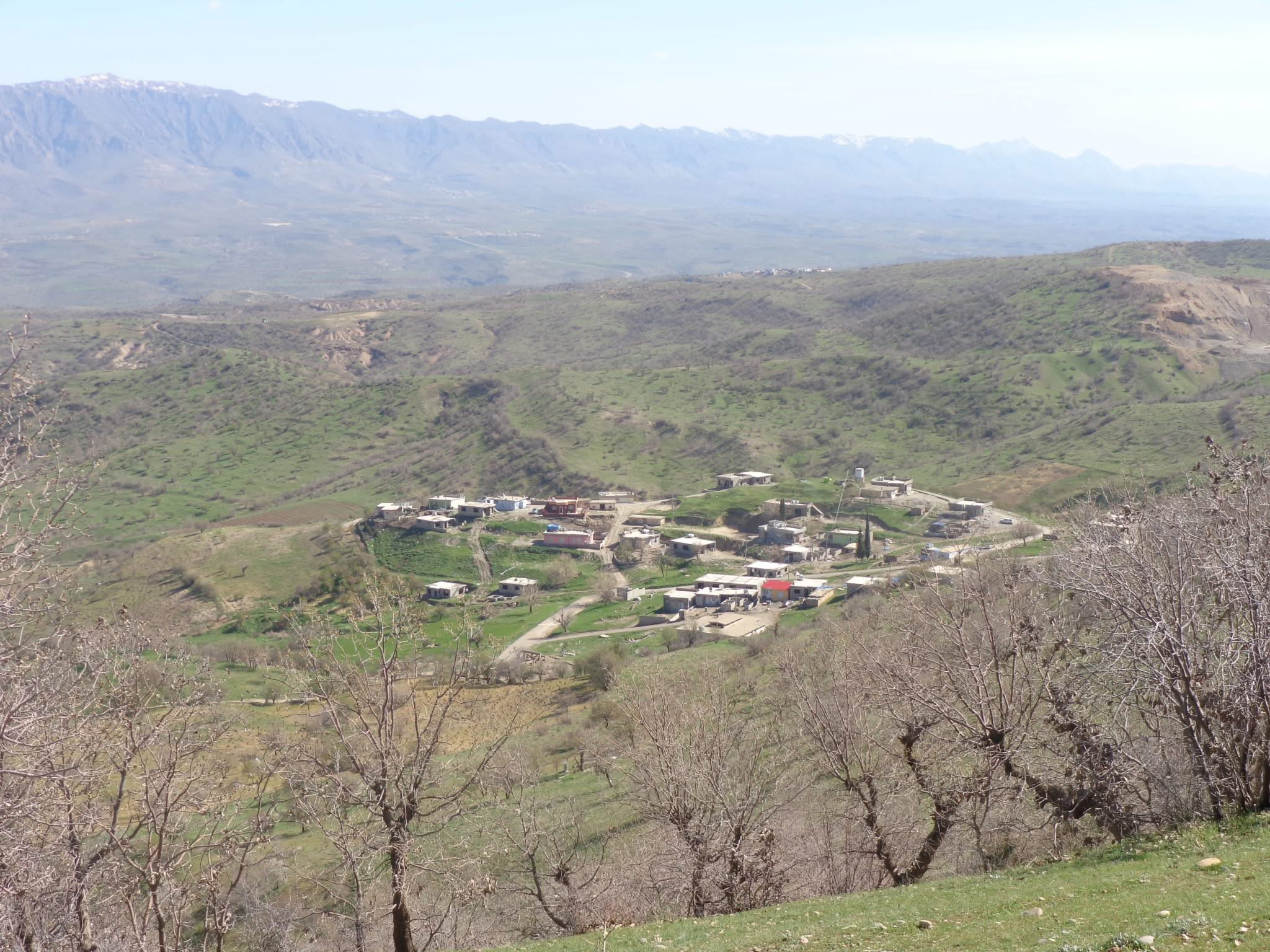
- Kovli village surrounded by green hills and distant mountains
- Interactive map of Kovli
- Location of Kovli in the Kurdistan Region Kovli (Iraqi Kurdistan)
- Coordinates: 37.04690°N 43.13931°E
- Country: Iraq
- Region: Kurdistan Region
- Governorate: Duhok
- District: Mangesh

Government
  - Village Chief: Ismail Mirza Mohammed Kovli

Population (2024)
  - Total: 167
- Time zone: UTC+3 (AST)

Kovli (Kurdish: گوندێ کوڤلی, romanized: Gundê Kovli) is a village located in the Duhok Governorate, Kurdistan Region, Iraq. It lies within the administrative boundaries of the Mangesh district.

== Notable people ==
- Wahid Kovli (1970–2017), a Peshmerga commander recognized for his leadership in operations against the ISIS.
- Shvan Ahmed Abdulkadir Kovli (born 1960), a Kurdish politician and former Peshmerga fighter affiliated with the Kurdistan Democratic Party. He has held positions in legislative committees focusing on reconstruction and Peshmerga affairs.

== Gallery ==
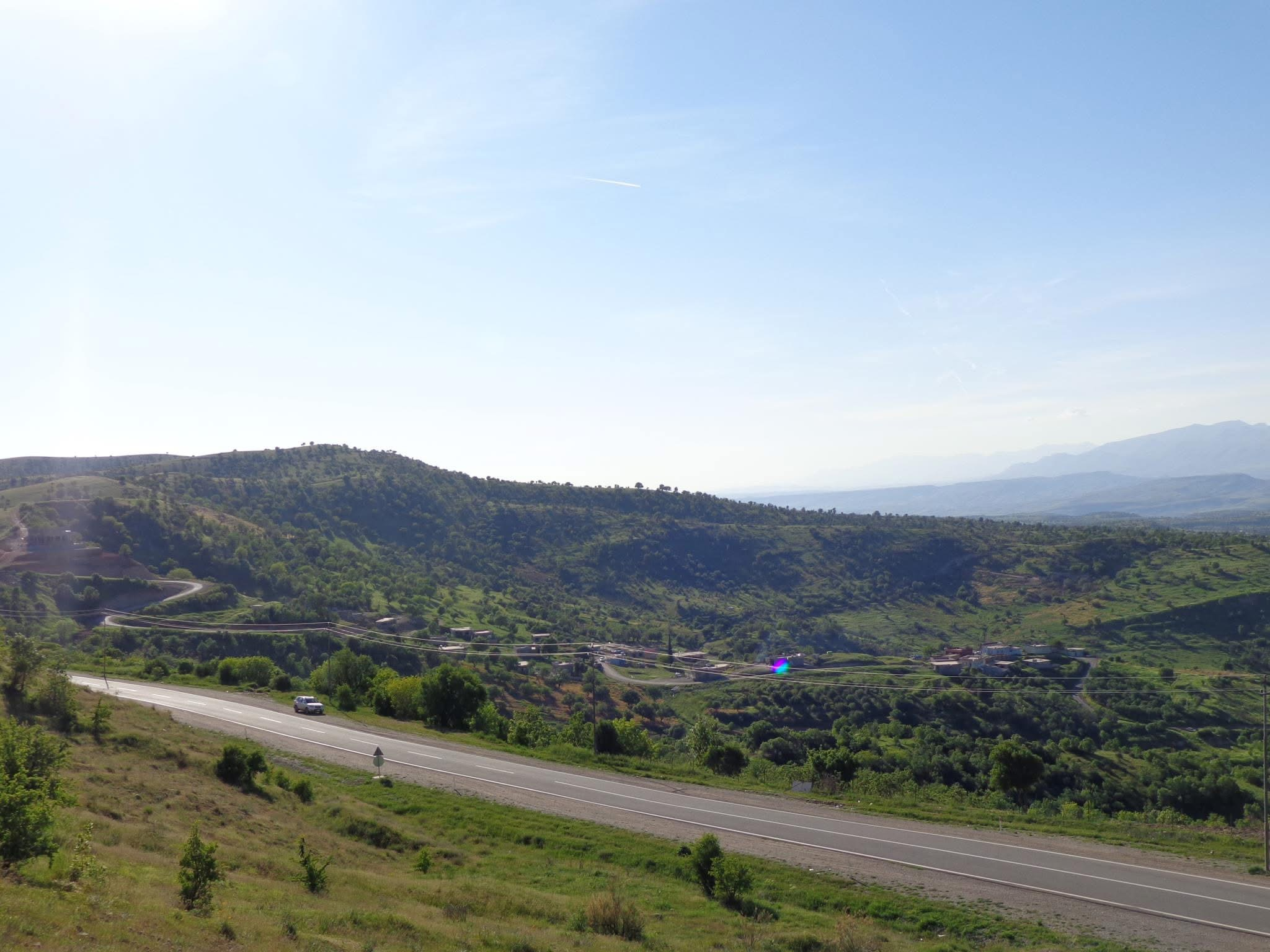
Kovli village in the valley with green hills and a winding road

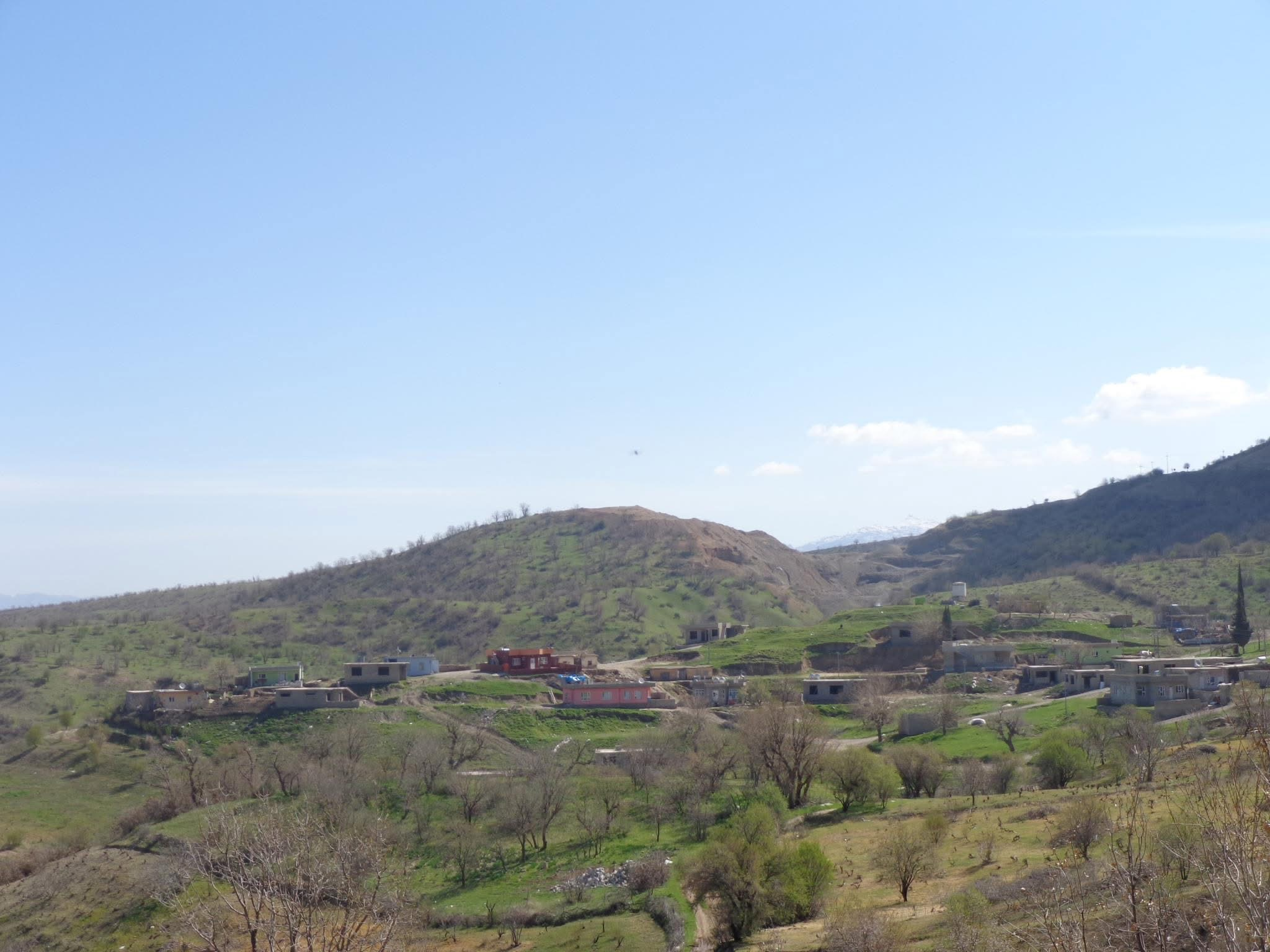
Kovli village nestled among rolling green hills with traditional and modern homes beneath a bright blue sky

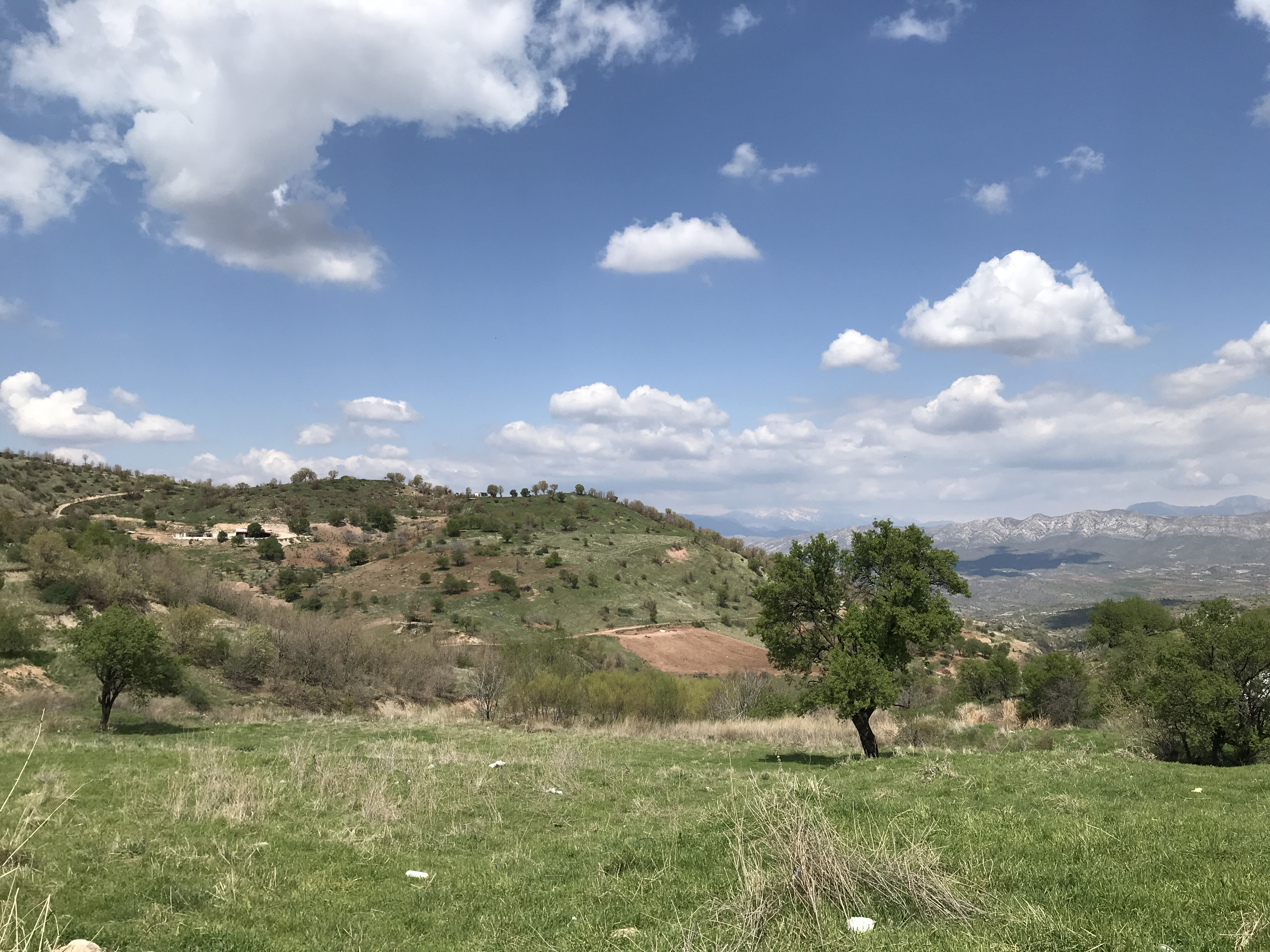
Kovli village nestled among green hills and distant mountains

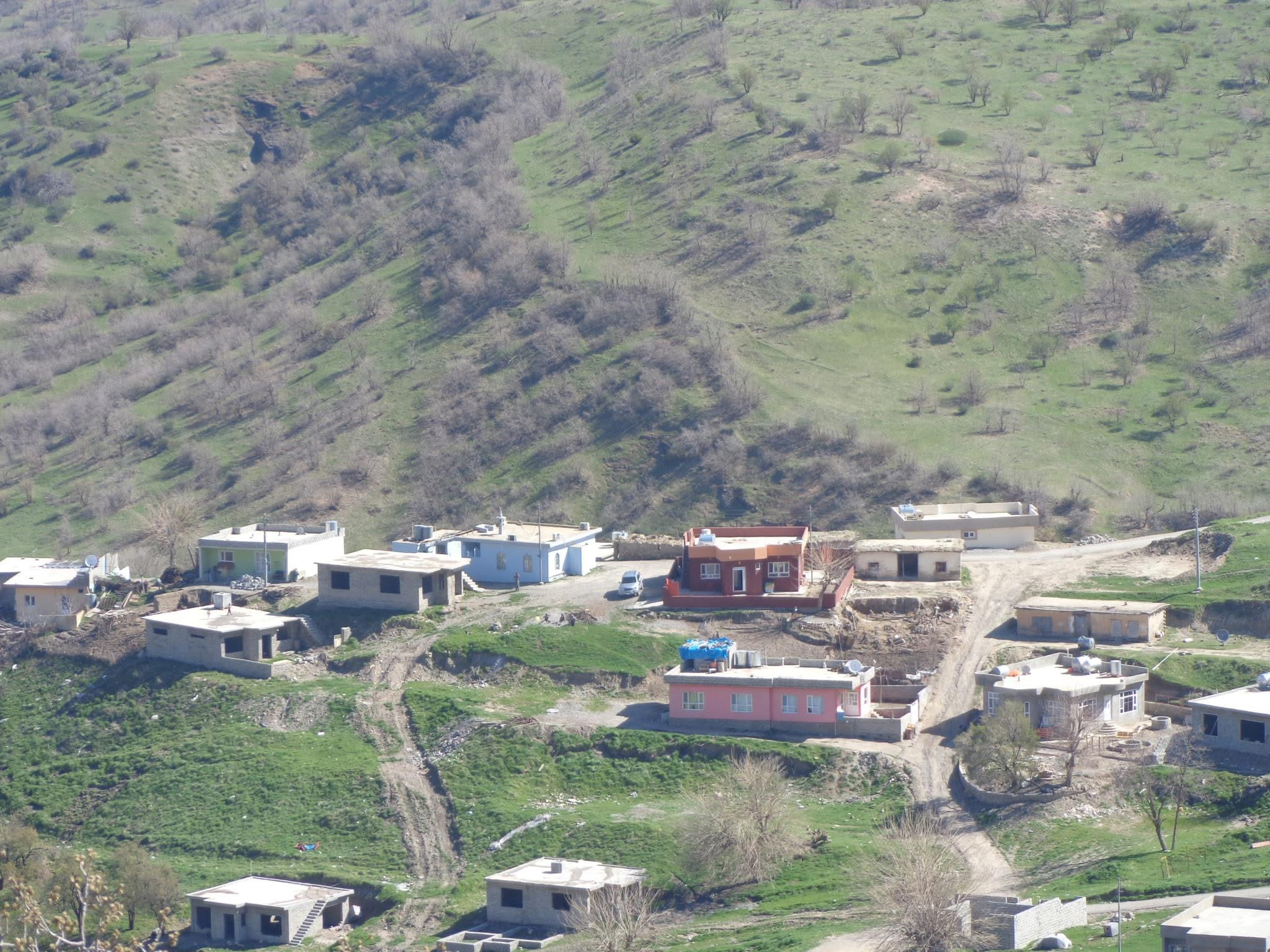
Overview of Kovli village with houses on a green hillside surrounded by open land

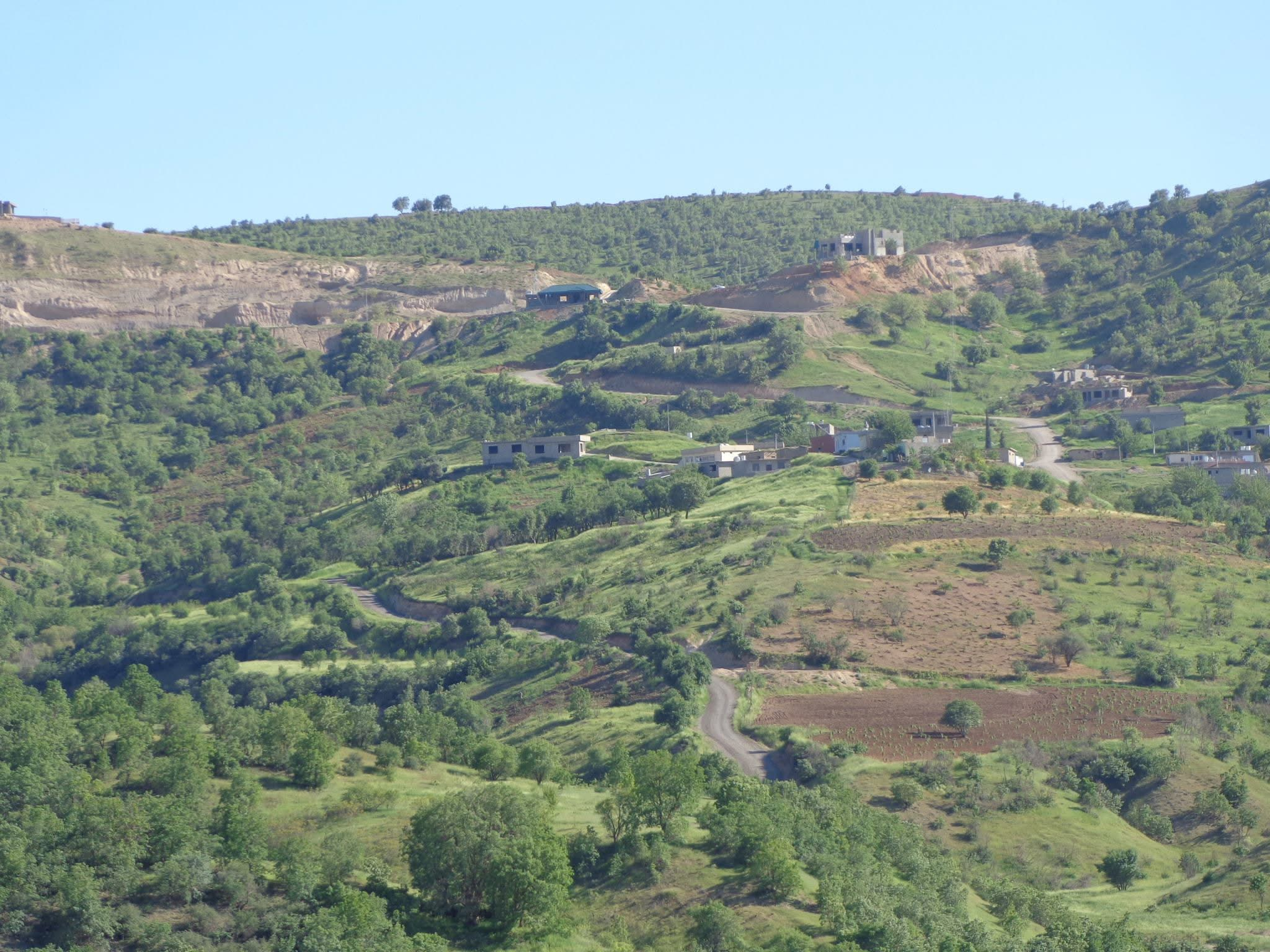
Hillside village in Kurdistan with winding roads connecting homes, fields, and rugged greenery

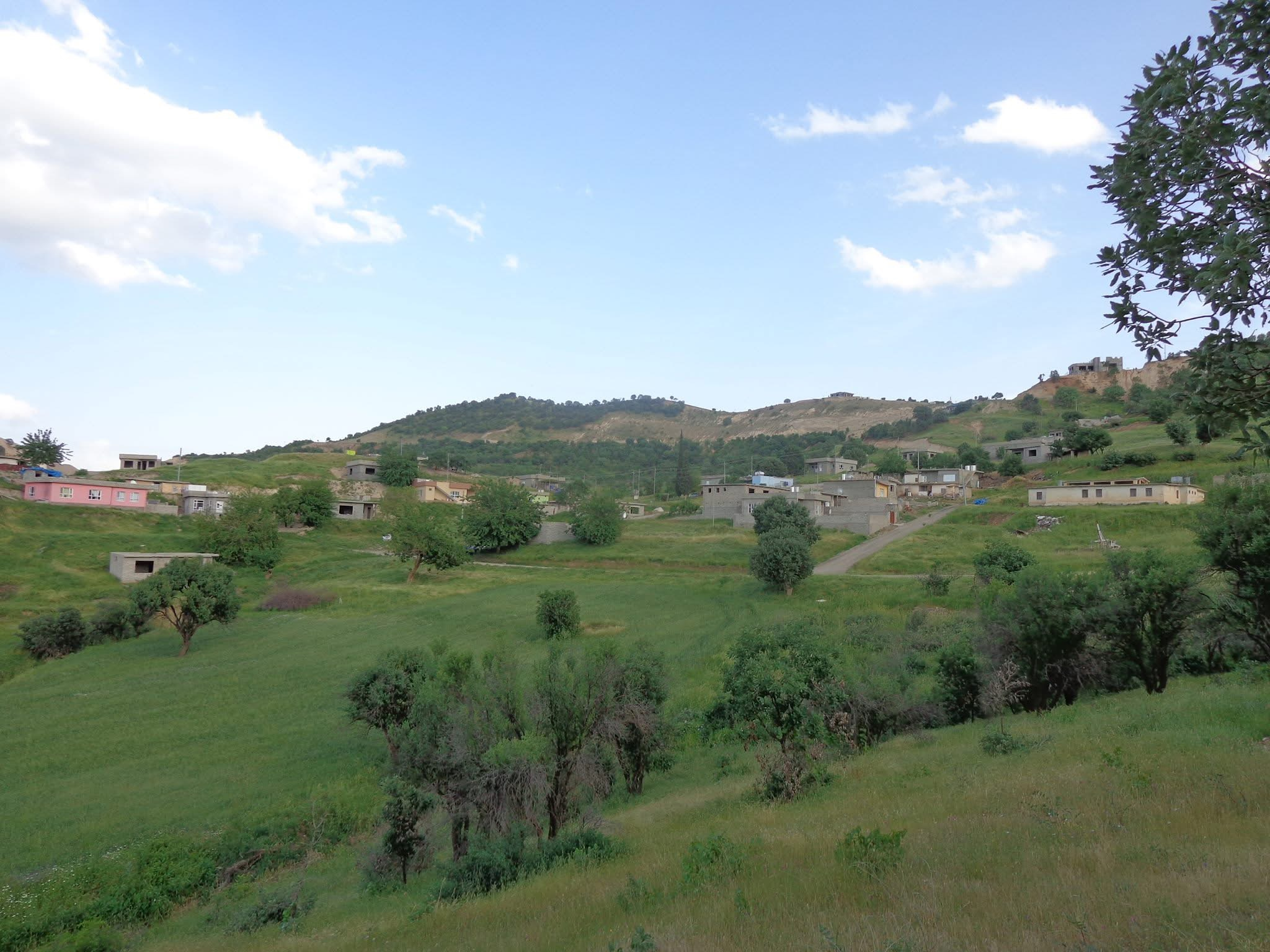
Village surrounded by lush greenery as seen from the hillside

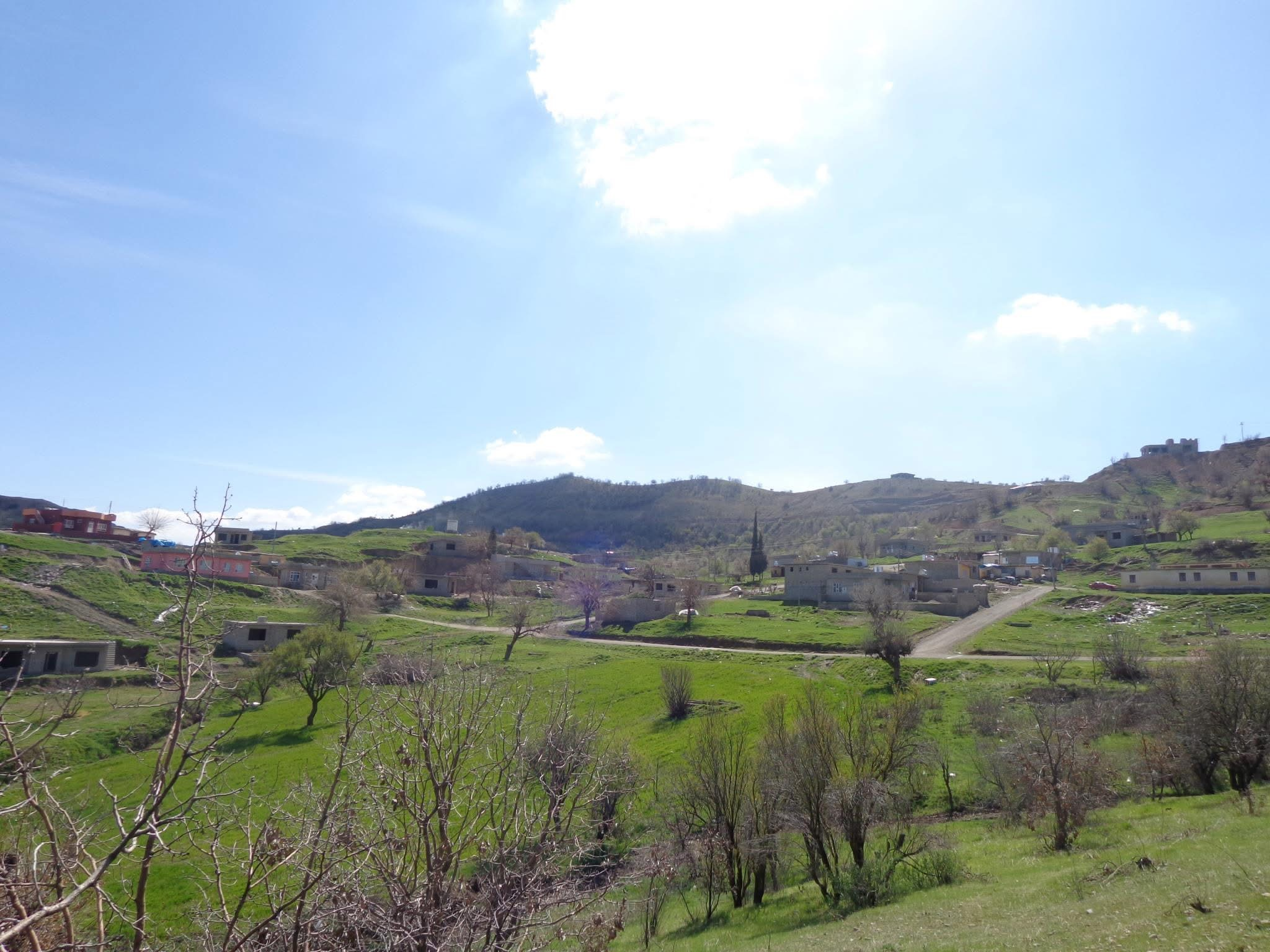
Village landscape under bright skies, viewed from the east

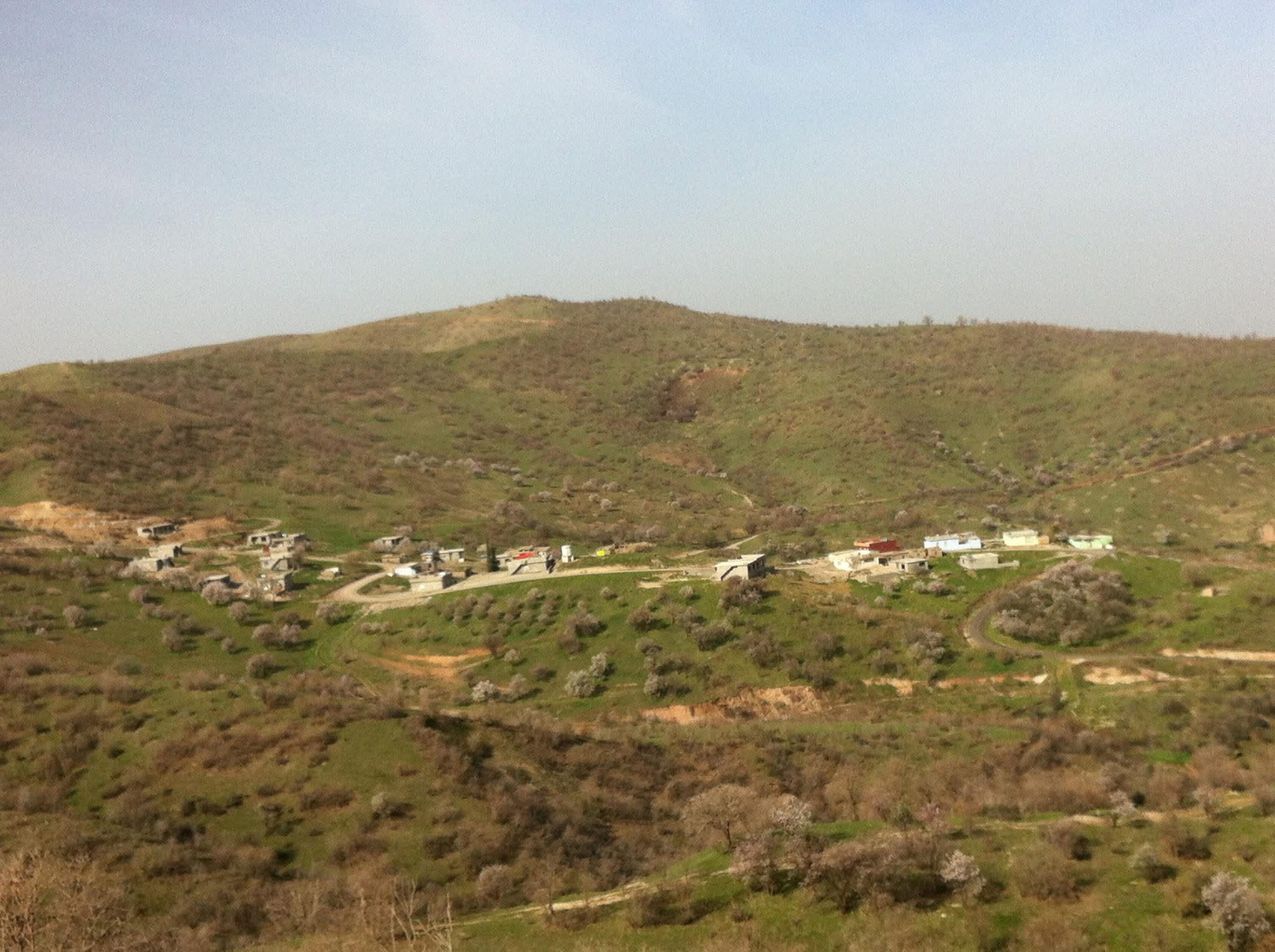
Hillside village surrounded by blossoming trees and green slopes

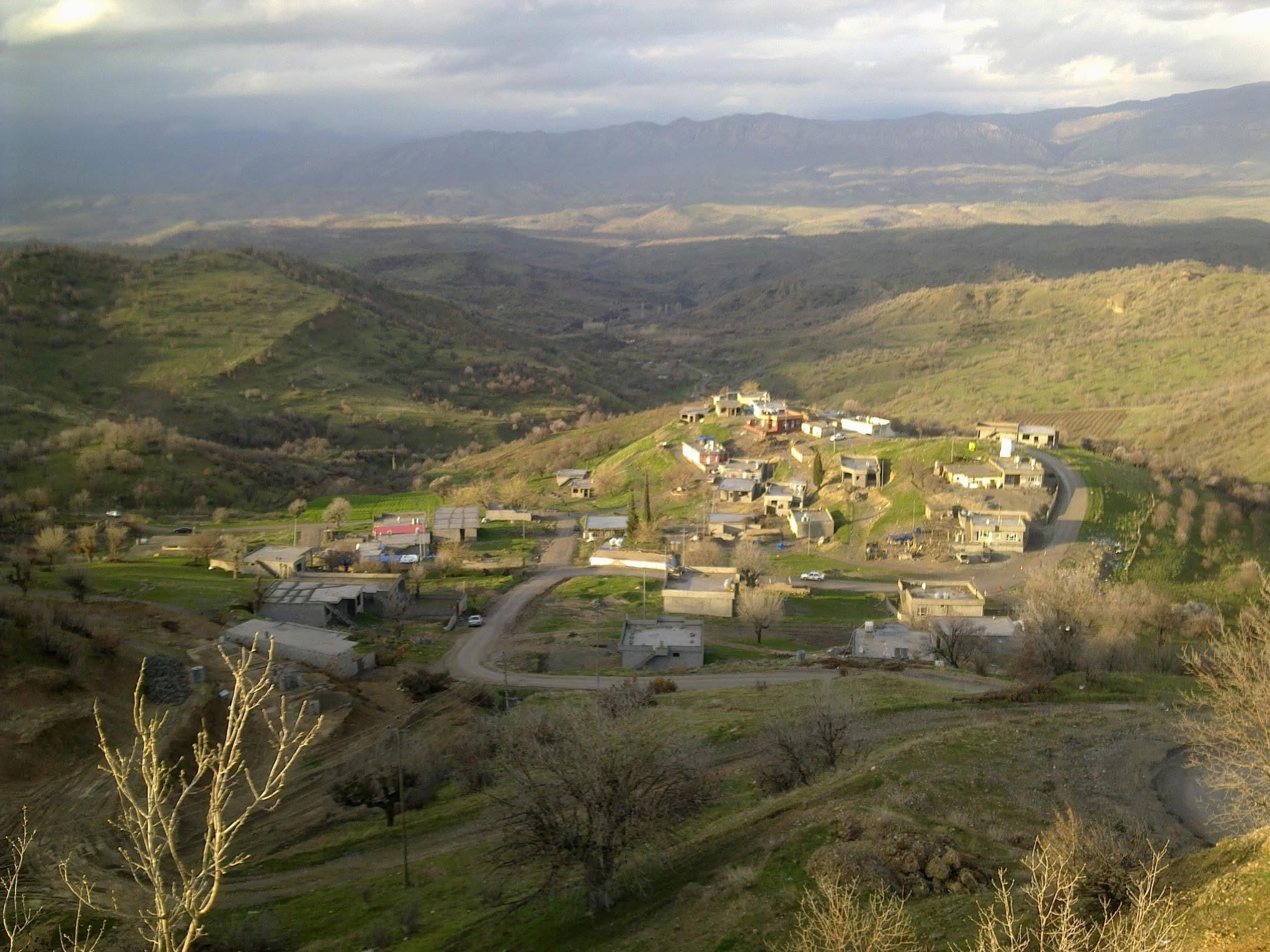
The village of Kovli nestled among rolling green hills and mountains

== See also ==
- Duhok Governorate
- Mangesh
