= Armash, Iraq =

Village in Shekhan District, Kurdistan Region, Iraq

Armash
- Location in Iraq Armash (Iraqi Kurdistan)
- Coordinates: 36.83741°N 43.38675°E
- Country: Iraq
- Region: Kurdistan Region (de facto)
- Governorate: Nineveh Governorate (de jure); Dohuk Governorate (de facto)
- District: Shekhan District
- Sub-district: Atrush

Armash is a village in Nineveh Governorate, Iraq. (Note: Alternatively transliterated as Armashe, Armashé, Harmache, Harmash, or Harmāshe.) It is located south of Jebel Gara in the Shekhan District.

== History ==
An ancient Assyrian stele is carved into the rockface near the village. The Church of Mar Ephrem at Armash was constructed in the seventh century. The village has a significant number of people who originate from the Tkhuma region in Hakkari. It was inhabited by 15-22 families with one church and no priests in 1850 as part of the Church of the East diocese of Mar Abraham of Gündük (Nerem), according to the English missionary George Percy Badger. In 1913, there were 310 Chaldean Catholics at Armash, who were served by one church and one priest as part of the diocese of Amadiya. Armash was populated by 204 Assyrians in thirteen households in 1957. The village was plundered and burned several times in 1961.

It was destroyed by the Iraqi government in 1987, at which time the village was inhabited by fifty-five families and had one school, and the village's population was resettled at Atrush, which was made a collective town. The Church of Mart Theresa at Armash was damaged during the Anfal campaign. 40 Assyrian families returned to the village after March 1991. An irrigation channel was constructed at Armash by the Assyrian Aid Society in 1999. By 2004, of the 70 Assyrian families from Armash, 40 families resided at the village, 17 families inhabited other parts of Iraq, and 13 families had joined the diaspora. There were 46 internally displaced Assyrians in 12 families from Baghdad at the village in 2007. By early 2009, three internally displaced Assyrians in one family resided at Armash. 160 Chaldean Catholics inhabited Armash in 2012. The Shlama Foundation constructed an irrigation canal at the village in 2024, in which year the village's population was 157.

== Bibliography ==
- Aboona, Hirmis (2008). Assyrians, Kurds, and Ottomans: Intercommunal Relations on the Periphery of the Ottoman Empire. Cambria Press.
- Badger, George Percy (1852). The Nestorians and Their Rituals: With the Narrative of a Mission to Mesopotamia and Coordistan in 1842-1844, and of a Late Visit to Those Countries in 1850; Also, Researches Into the Present Condition of the Syrian Jacobites, Papal Syrians, and Chaldeans, and an Inquiry Into the Religious Tenets of the Yezeedees. Vol. 1.
- Donabed, Sargon George (2015). Reforging a Forgotten History: Iraq and the Assyrians in the Twentieth Century. Edinburgh University Press.
- Eshoo, Majed (2004). The Fate Of Assyrian Villages Annexed To Today's Dohuk Governorate In Iraq And The Conditions In These Villages Following The Establishment Of The Iraqi State In 1921 (PDF). Translated by Mary Challita.
- Oehring, Otmar (2017). Christians and Yazidis in Iraq: Current Situation and Prospects. Konrad Adenauer Foundation.
- Wilmshurst, David (2000). The Ecclesiastical Organisation of the Church of the East, 1318–1913 (PDF). Peeters Publishers.
