= Sarsing =

- Town
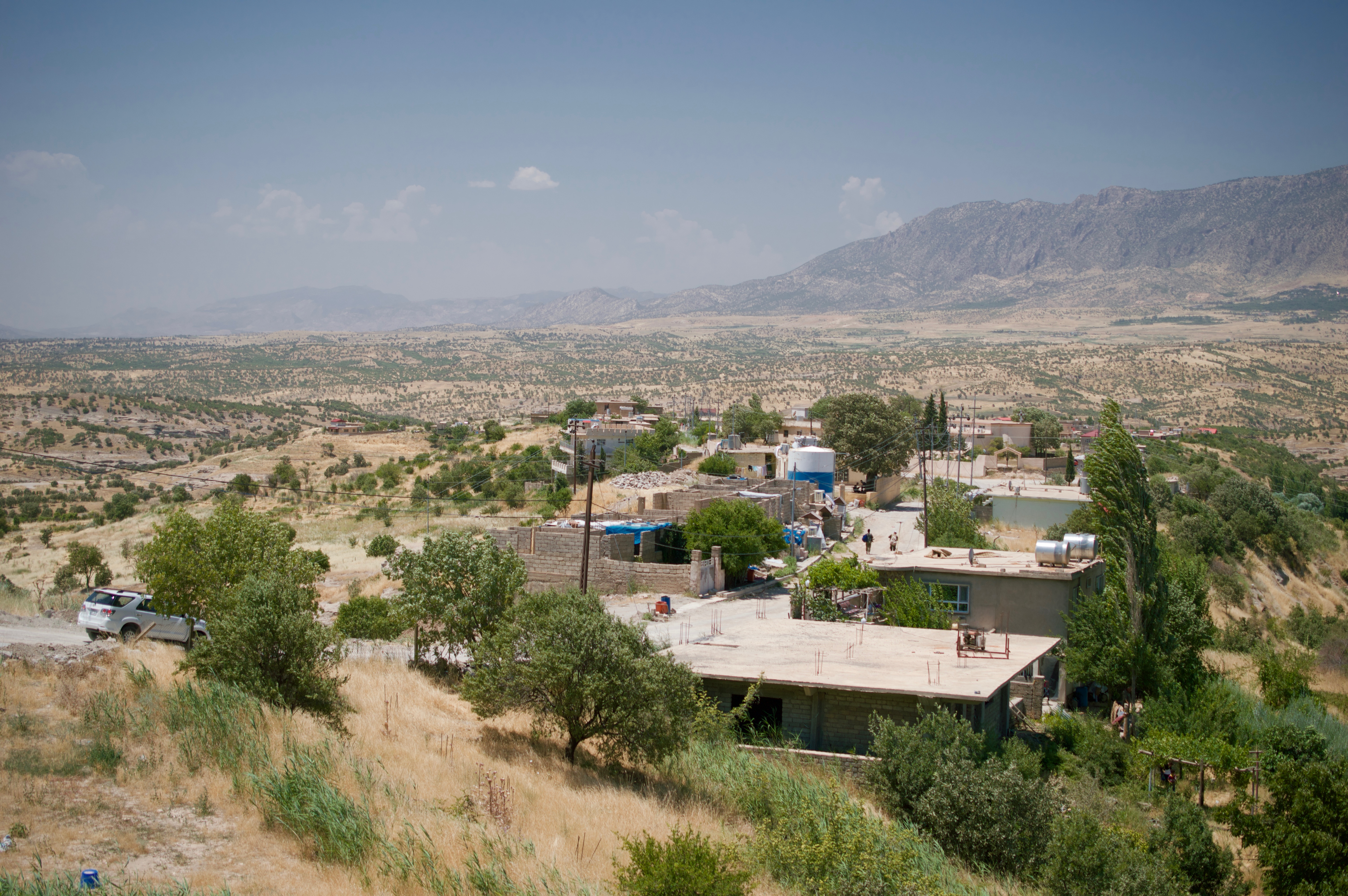
- Sarsing in Dohuk Governorate, Iraqi Kurdistan

- Location in Iraq Sarsing (Iraqi Kurdistan)
- Country: Iraq
- Region: Kurdistan Region
- Governorate: Dohuk Governorate
- District: Amedi District
- Sub-district: Sarsing

Population (2014)
  - Urban: 16,766
  - Rural: 6,795

Sarsing (Kurdish: سەرسنک, romanized: Sersink, Syriac: ܣܪܣܢܓ) is a town and sub-district in the Dohuk Governorate in Kurdistan Region, Iraq. It is located in the Sapna valley in the Amedi District.

In the town, there is a church of Mar Mattai. There was previously a shrine of Mar Giwargis.

== History ==
In 1922, Sarsing was settled by Assyrian refugees of the Tyari clan from Hakkari atop the ruins of an old Assyrian village. Upon its resettlement, the population consisted of 100 Assyrian families in 40 households, all adherents of the Church of the East, who had survived the Assyrian genocide in Turkey. The population shrank to roughly 150 people in 1933 amidst the Simele massacre, but recovered to 301 people in 55 families by 1938.

A royal palace was constructed at Sarsing by Crown Prince 'Abd al-Ilah, regent to King Faisal II of Iraq, and was often visited by both regent and king in the summer. King Faisal II had a shrine of Mar Giwargis built in the place of a ruined monastery of Mar Giwargis in the early 1950s and a church of Mar Mattai was also constructed in 1955 on the ruins of a monastery of Mar Mattai.

At the onset of the First Iraqi–Kurdish War in 1961, the population had grown to 700 people in 150 families and 80 households. By the early 1960s, Sarsing had become a key tourist attraction and a hotel, cinema, and restaurants were established. However, after the war, most of the Assyrians' land to the north and west of Sarsing were seized and settled by Kurds from the villages of Araden Islam and Kani Janarki under instruction from the Kurdish military leader Mustafa Barzani in 1972–1973.

The shrine of Mar Giwargis was demolished in 1977 and replaced by a hotel that burnt down in the mid-1980s. In the aftermath of the Al-Anfal campaign and establishment of the Iraqi no-fly zones, displaced Kurds from the village of Jia in Erbil Governorate were resettled in 1993 by Kurdistan Democratic Party (KDP) leader Masoud Barzani in lands to the east of Sarsing seized from Assyrians, until which point Sarsing had been exclusively populated by Assyrians.

On 22 July 1998, it was reported that Assyrian houses at Sarsing were attacked by Kurds and some were injured by gun fire, including a fourteen-year-old child. Reports of damages to crops and vineyards and theft of crops belonging to Assyrians at Sarsing have also been documented since 2002. In early 2009, 113 displaced Assyrians with 35 families resided at Sarsing, and 1000 Assyrians, all of whom were adherents of the Assyrian Church of the East, are estimated to have inhabited the town in 2012. The Assyrian population has thus declined due to threats and attacks from Kurds from over 300 households in 2014, to 118 households in 2016, and then to 92 households in 2019, by which time the Kurdish population had grown to over 2000 households. As of 2021, 325 Assyrians in 93 families inhabit Sarsing.

== Gallery ==
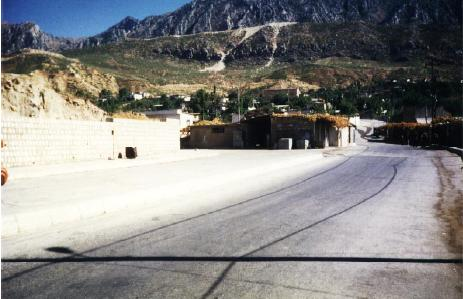
Entrance to Sarsing

Inscription at the Church of Mar Mattai

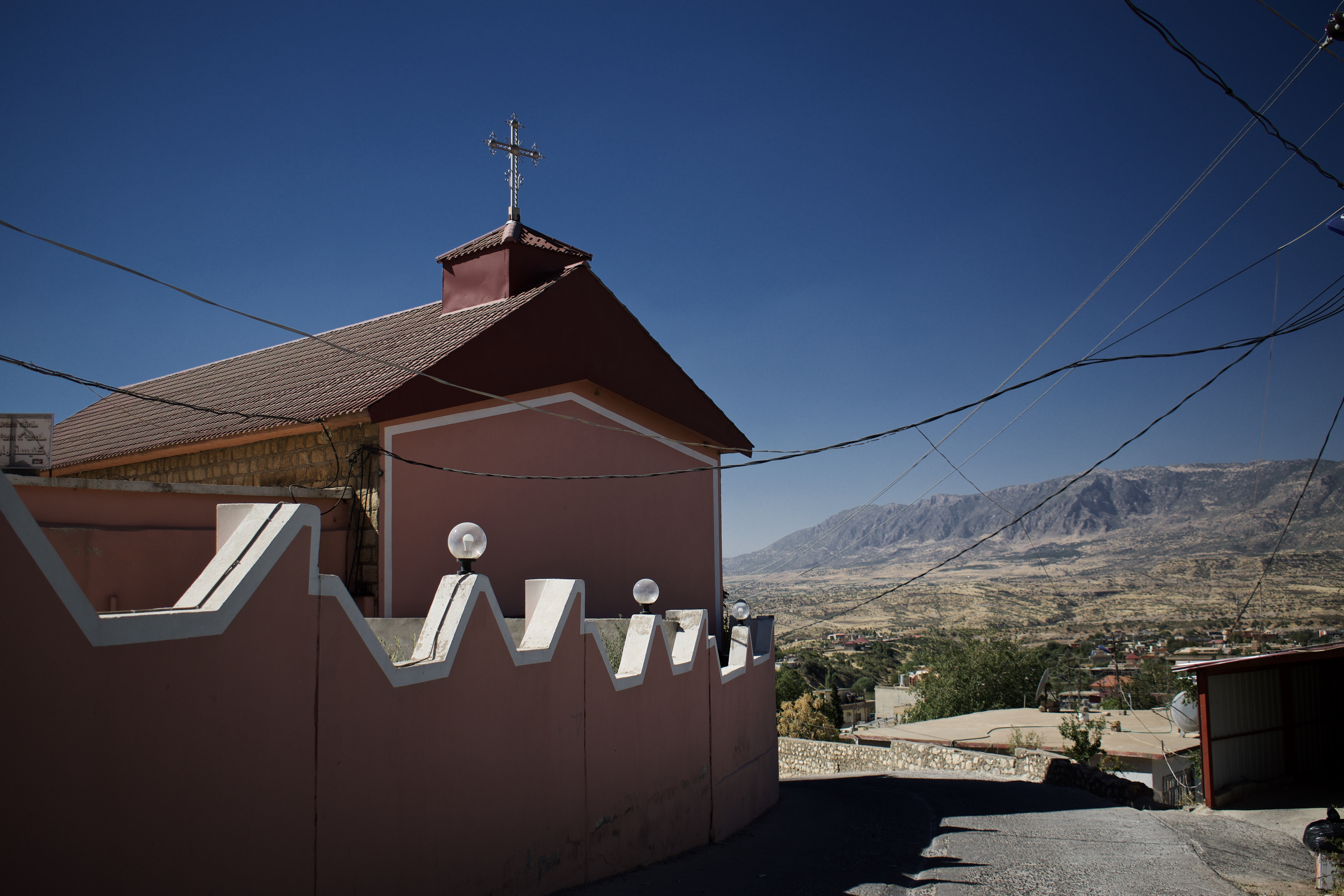
Church of Mar Mattai

== Bibliography ==
- Donabed, Sargon George (2015). Reforging a Forgotten History: Iraq and the Assyrians in the Twentieth Century. Edinburgh University Press.
- Eshoo, Majed (2004). The Fate Of Assyrian Villages Annexed To Today's Dohuk Governorate In Iraq And The Conditions In These Villages Following The Establishment Of The Iraqi State In 1921 (PDF). Translated by Mary Challita.
- Hanna, Reine; Barber, Matthew (2017). Erasing Assyrians: How the KRG Abuses Human Rights, Undermines Democracy, and Conquers Minority Homelands. Assyrian Confederation of Europe.
