= Bamarni =

- Village
- Location in Iraq Bamarni (Iraqi Kurdistan)
- Coordinates: 37°07′16″N 43°16′09″E
- Country: Iraq
- Region: Kurdistan Region
- Governorate: Duhok Governorate
- District: Amadiya District
- Sub-district: Bamarni

Population (2014)
  - Urban: 1,957
  - Rural: 5,687

Bamarni (Arabic: بامرني; Kurdish: بامه‌رنێ, romanized: Bamernê; Syriac: Beṯ Mūrdānī; Hebrew: במרני) is a village and sub-district in the Duhok Governorate in Kurdistan Region, Iraq. It is located in the Sapna valley in the district of Amadiya.

The village is located in a mountain gorge and has a strong Naqshbandi presence.

== History ==
Bamarni is first attested as an Assyrian Christian village with the name Beṯ Mūrdānī in the 10th-century Life of Rabban Joseph Busnaya whose inhabitants adhered to the Church of the East. A Jewish community also previously resided at Bamarni. In the early 20th century, Bamarni was the residence of the Naqshbandi Sheikh Bahā al-Dīn, whose house and takiyya was destroyed by the British in August 1919, but was later permitted to return. At this time, there were six or seven Jewish households.

In December 2020, Miran Abdulrahman was appointed mayor of the sub-district, making her the first female mayor in the Dohuk Province.

== See also ==
- Bamarni Air Base

== Bibliography ==
- KRSO (2009), "2009 - ناوی پاریزگا. يه که کارگيرييه كانی پاریزگاكانی هه ریمی کوردستان" (PDF), Kurdistan Region Statistics Office (KRSO) (in Kurdish), pp. 1–179, archived from the original (PDF) on 14 March 2017
- Wilmshurst, David (2000). The Ecclesiastical Organisation of the Church of the East, 1318–1913 (PDF). Peeters Publishers.
- Zaken, Mordechai (2007). Jewish Subjects and Their Tribal Chieftains in Kurdistan: A Study in Survival. Brill.
