= Ali Tatar =

Governor of Duhok Governorate in the Kurdistan Region of Iraq

Dr. Ali Tatar Tawfiq Muhammad Amin
- عەلی تەتەر
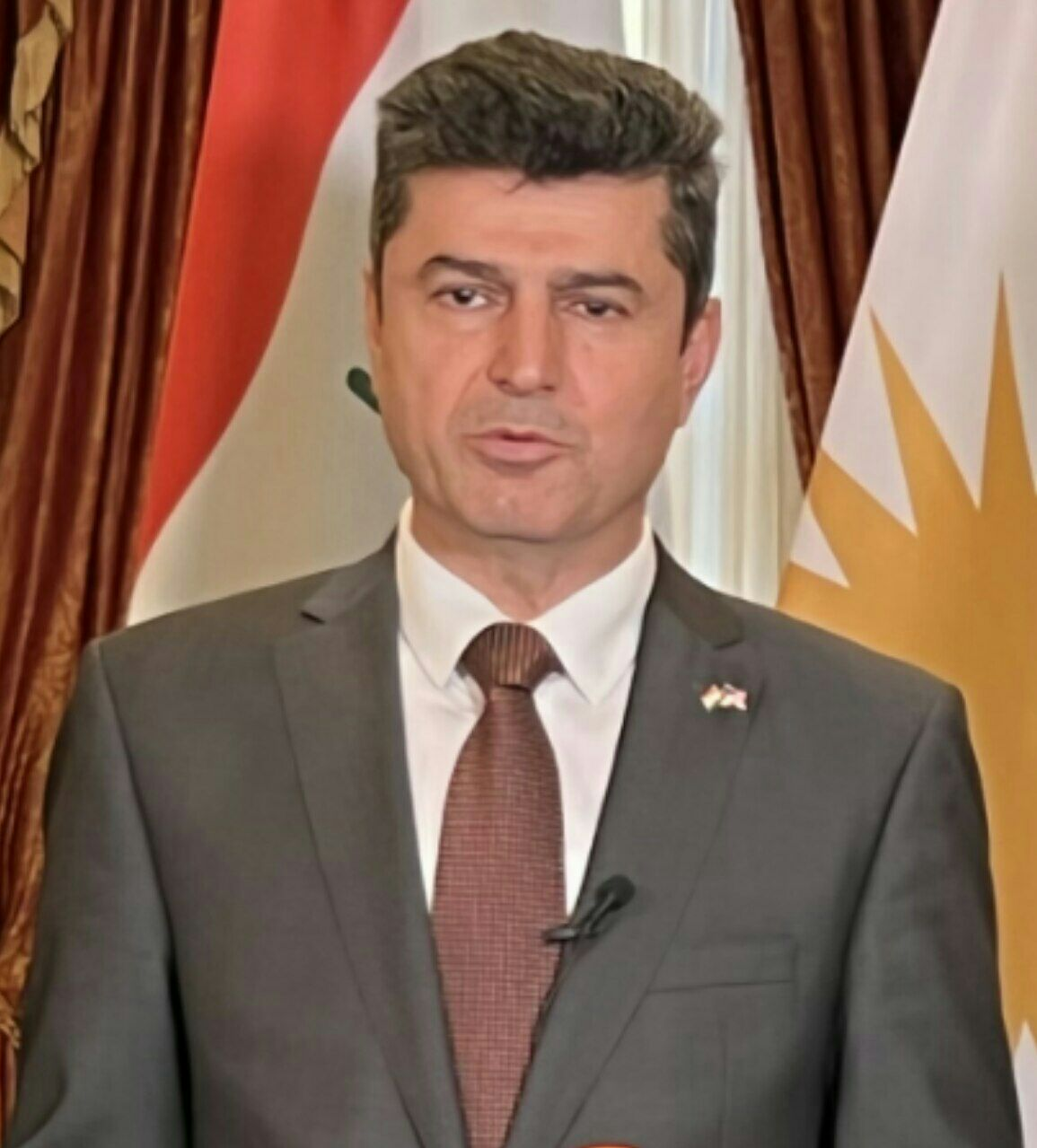
- Ali Tatar in 2022

Governor of Duhok
- Incumbent
- Assumed office 2020
- Prime Minister: Masrour Barzani
- Preceded by: Farhad Atrushi

Director General of the Intelligence Unit of Duhok Governorate
- In office 2002–2011

Member of the Board of Trustees of The American University of Kurdistan
- Incumbent
- Assumed office 2012

Personal details
- Born: 15 October 1968 (age 57) Amedi, Kurdistan Region, Iraq
- Party: Kurdistan Democratic Party
- Education: University of Duhok (BA, MA, PhD); The American University of Kurdistan – Board of Trustees
- Alma mater: University of Duhok, The American University of Kurdistan
- Occupation: Politician, Academic

Military service
- Branch/service: Peshmerga
- Years of service: 1989–1992

Dr. Ali Tatar Tawfiq Muhammad Amin, known as Ali Tatar (Kurdish: عەلی تەتەر, romanized: Elî Teter Tewfîq Mihemed Emîn; born 15 October 1968, Amedi), is an Iraqi Kurdish politician of the Kurdistan Democratic Party (K.D.P). Mr. Tatar is the current governor of Duhok.

== Early life and education ==
Ali Tatar was born on 15 Oct, 1968 in Nerwa-Rekkan sub-district of the Amedi district. He was displaced with his family to Iran during the Kurdish struggle, while constantly fighting for their rights from 1975 until 1992 when he was finally able to return to Kurdistan. Ali was later imprisoned by the Iraqi Regime for actions performed during his time with the Kurdish liberation forces in 1989. He joined the Kurdish liberation forces (known as the Peshmerga) in 1989 and for some time was imprisoned by the Iraqi forces. Tatar has a bachelor's degree in college of Arts – History department from University of Duhok and finished master's degree in majoring new and contemporary history and in 2008 he received a PhD.

In 2012 he became an assistant professor at the University of Duhok and in 2018 he was awarded a full professorship. He is also a member of the Board of Trustees from the American University of Kurdistan.

== Professional career ==
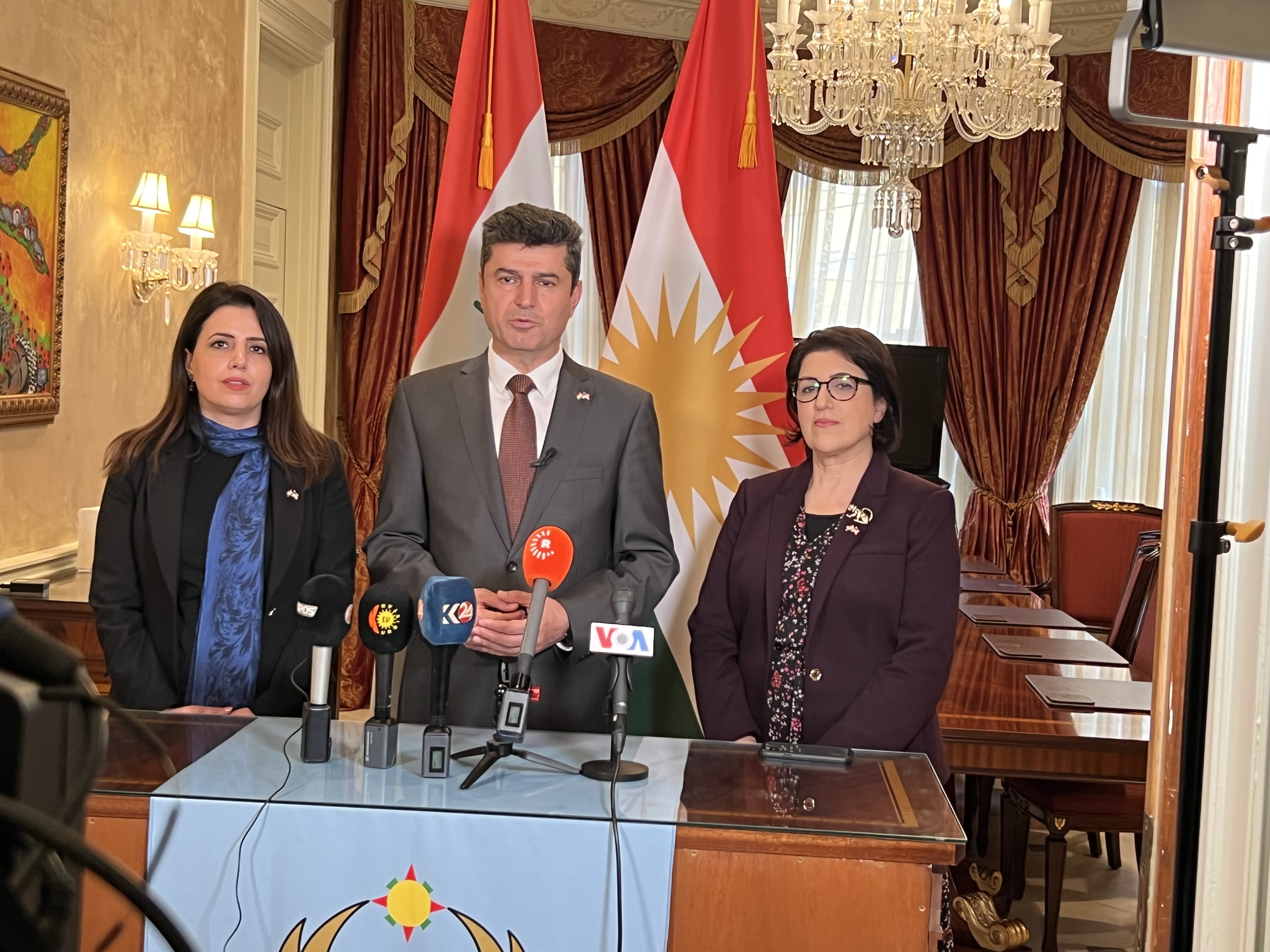
The visit of the delegation of Dohuk Governorate, headed by the Governor of Dohuk, Dr. Ali Tatar, to United States of America

He was the Director General of the Intelligence Unit of the Duhok Governorate between the 2002 and 2011 and held several positions within the KDP before assuming as the Governor of Duhok on appointment by Prime Minister Masrour Barzani in 2020.

== Governance and controversies ==
While no formal corruption charges or verified investigations have been brought against Ali Tatar, his tenure and earlier intelligence roles have drawn criticism regarding transparency and governance in the Duhok Governorate.

As a long-time member of the Kurdistan Democratic Party (KDP) and a former Director General of the Intelligence Unit in Duhok (2002–2011), Tatar has been part of a political and security system that analysts describe as having opaque financial management, a concentration of power, and limited accountability mechanisms. Observers have noted that the close ties between the KDP leadership and regional security institutions have made oversight challenging, particularly concerning border revenues and security contracting.

In 2021, a Middle East Institute report referenced statements by Tatar acknowledging that the Duhok governorate lacked precise information on the total revenues generated at the Ibrahim Khalil border crossing, raising questions about transparency in provincial revenue management.

Despite these criticisms, Tatar has publicly promoted anti-corruption initiatives, including the 2024 launch of the "MyAccount" (حسابي) project aimed at increasing financial transparency and reducing opportunities for money laundering in Duhok.
