= Sapna valley =

Valley in Iraq

Sapna Valley
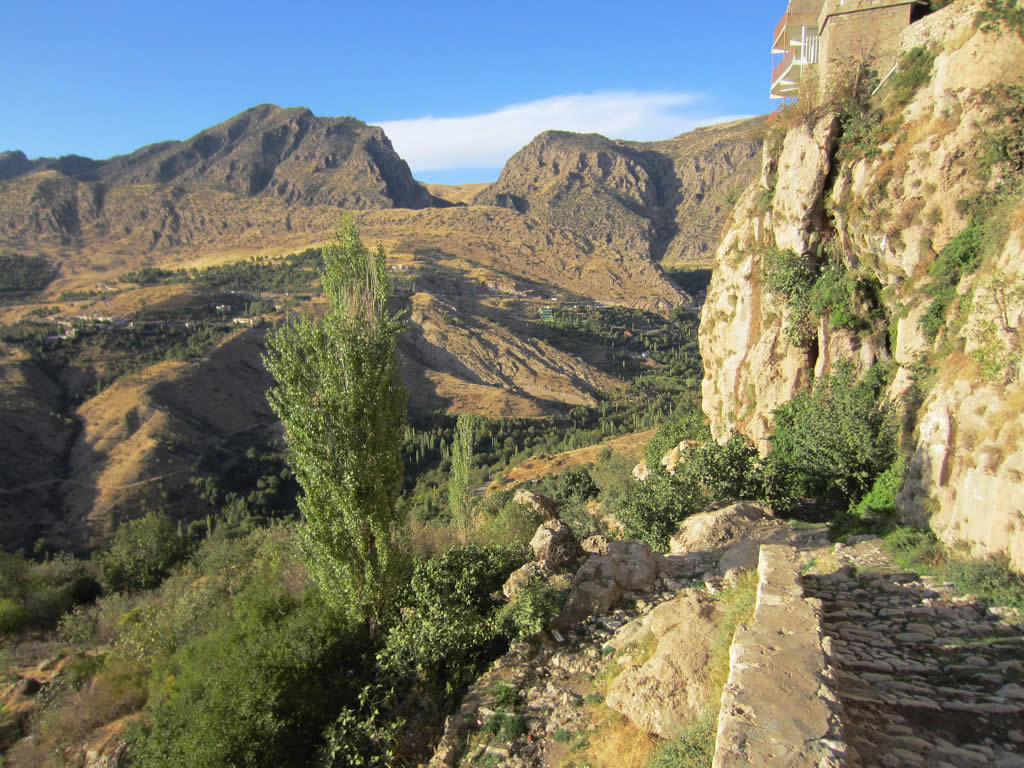
- A view of the hills around Amedi in the central portion of the valley
- Long-axis direction: North-South

Geology
- Type: River valley

Geography
- Location: Kurdistan Region, Iraq
- Country: Iraq
- State/Province: Dohuk Governorate
- District: Amedi District
- Population center: Amedi, Araden, Bamarni
- Coordinates: 37°05′N 43°30′E
- River: Great Zab
- Interactive map of Sapna Valley

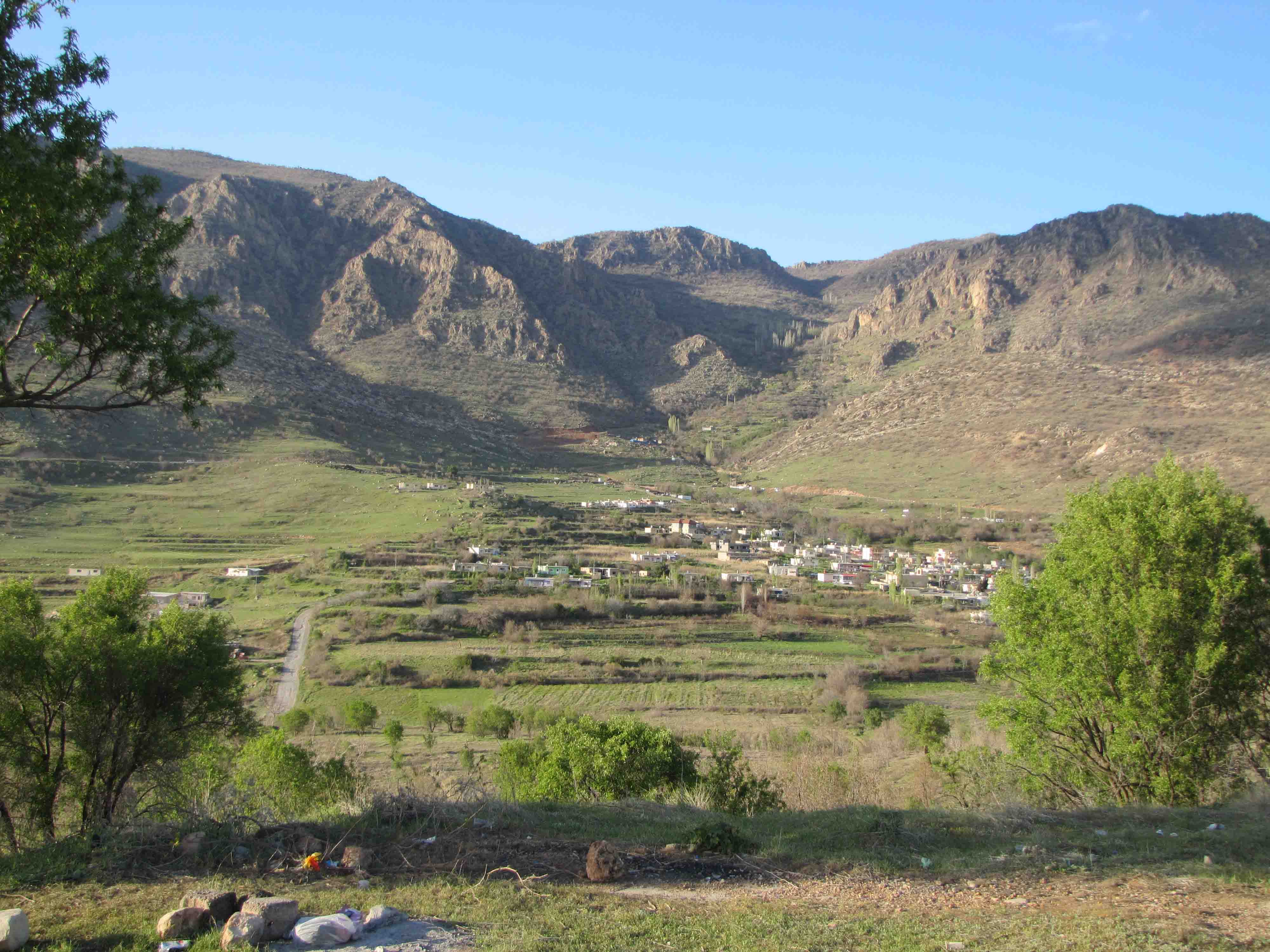
A view of the western portion of the Sapna valley looking north towards the village of Araden and the Gozaneh mountains

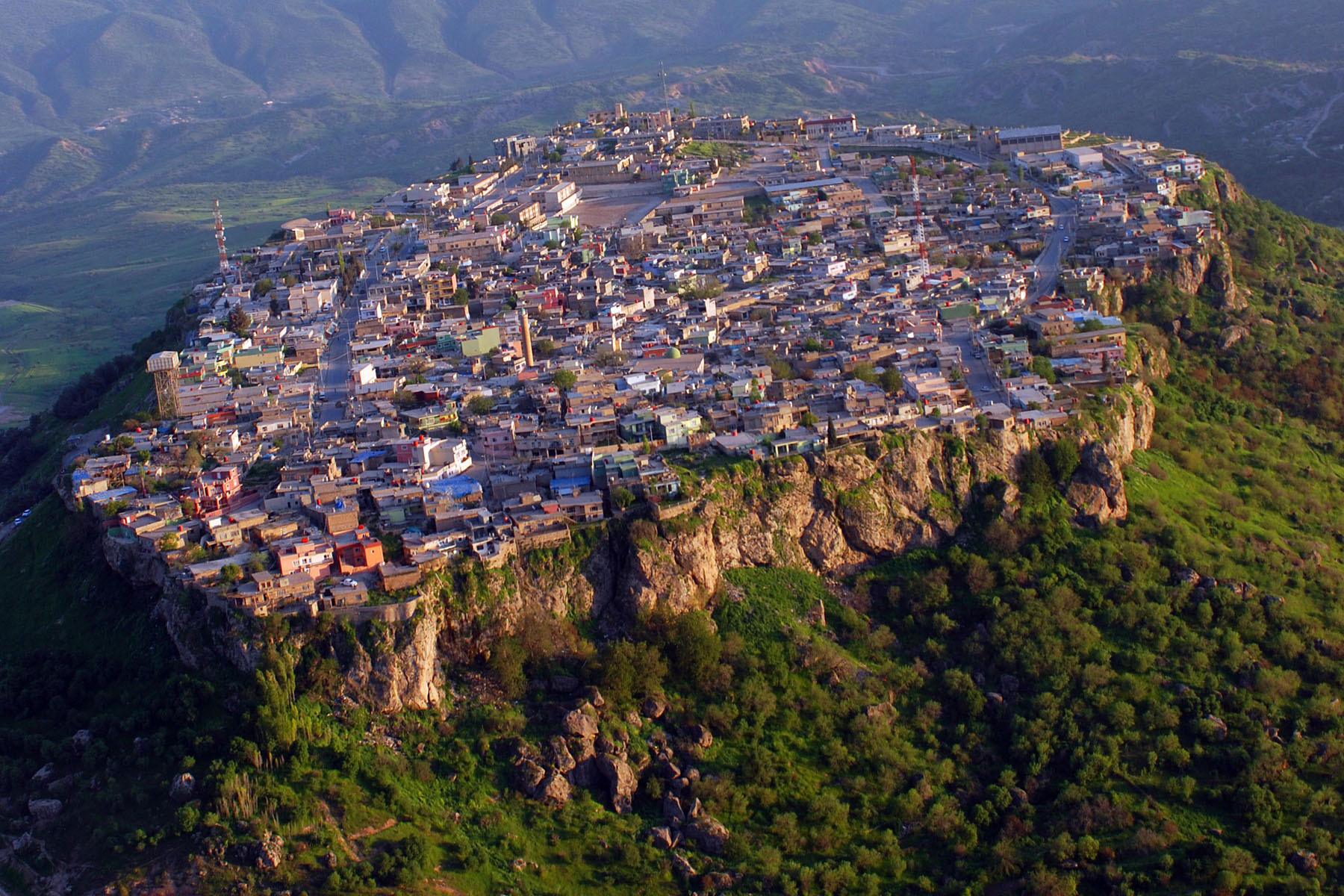
The city of Amedi, taken from the sky looking north

Sapna Valley (Kurdish: ڕووباری سپنه‌, romanized: Rîbarê Sipne) is a large valley in the Kurdistan Region of Iraq, contained by two small mountain ranges to the north which are part of the greater Zagros mountain range. The valley is watered by the Great Zab river which flows along the eastern portion of the valley, and features hilly terrain in the central portion of it around Amadiya District.

== See also ==
- Araden
- Bamarni
- Dehi
