= 1957 Iraqi census =

The Iraqi census of 1957 was the second census taken in the Kingdom of Iraq. The census took place after more than 25 years of the establishment of the Iraq. The census showed that the country had a total population of 6,339,960. Muslims made 95% of the total population, with Christians coming second at 3.3%, Yezidis with 0.88%, and Jews with 0.08%. The biggest city was the capital Baghdad, with a population of 490,496.

Governorate	Today part of	Muslims	Christians	Jewish	Mandaeans	Yezidis	Others	Unknown	Total
Amara	Maysan	325,900	1,086	65	2,579	71	9	113	329,840
Baghdad	Baghdad and Saladin	1,235,538	68,775	3,634	3,768	311	431	555	1,313,012
Basra	Basra	489,117	11,238	352	2,182	59	94	288	503,330
Erbil	Erbil	265,984	7,198	1	41	20	2	137	273,383
Diyala	Diyala	328,410	816	67	223	12	195	113	329,836
Diwaniya	Qadisiyah, Muthanna and Najaf	519,732	429	42	192	55	1	19	520,470
Dulaim	Al-Anbar	244,570	8,041	18	243	18	20	113	253,023
Hilla	Babil	354,047	502	16	72	28	11	103	354,779
Karbala	Karbala	217,143	91	18	38	9	17	59	217,375
Kirkuk	Kirkuk	375,232	13,150	6	242	23	56	130	388,839
Kut	Wasit	294,955	313	52	225	42	4	308	295,899
Mosul	Ninawa and Dohuk	609,247	90,348	18	61	55,129	169	475	755,447
Muntafiq	Dhi Qar	456,885	314	17	1,544	28	3	57	458,848
Sulaymaniya	Sulaymaniya	302,825	1,925	13	15	23	23	71	304,894
Total		6,057,493	206,206	4,906	11,825	55,885	1,039	2,606	6,339,960

== Sources ==
- 1957 Iraqi census (archived from the original on February 27, 2012).
