= Duhok Governorate =

Governorate of Iraq

Coordinates: 37°3′N 43°9′E

Duhok Governorate: Sorani Kurdish: پارێزگای دھۆک; Kurmanji Kurdish: پارێزگەها دهۆکێ; Arabic: محافظة دهوك
- Governorate
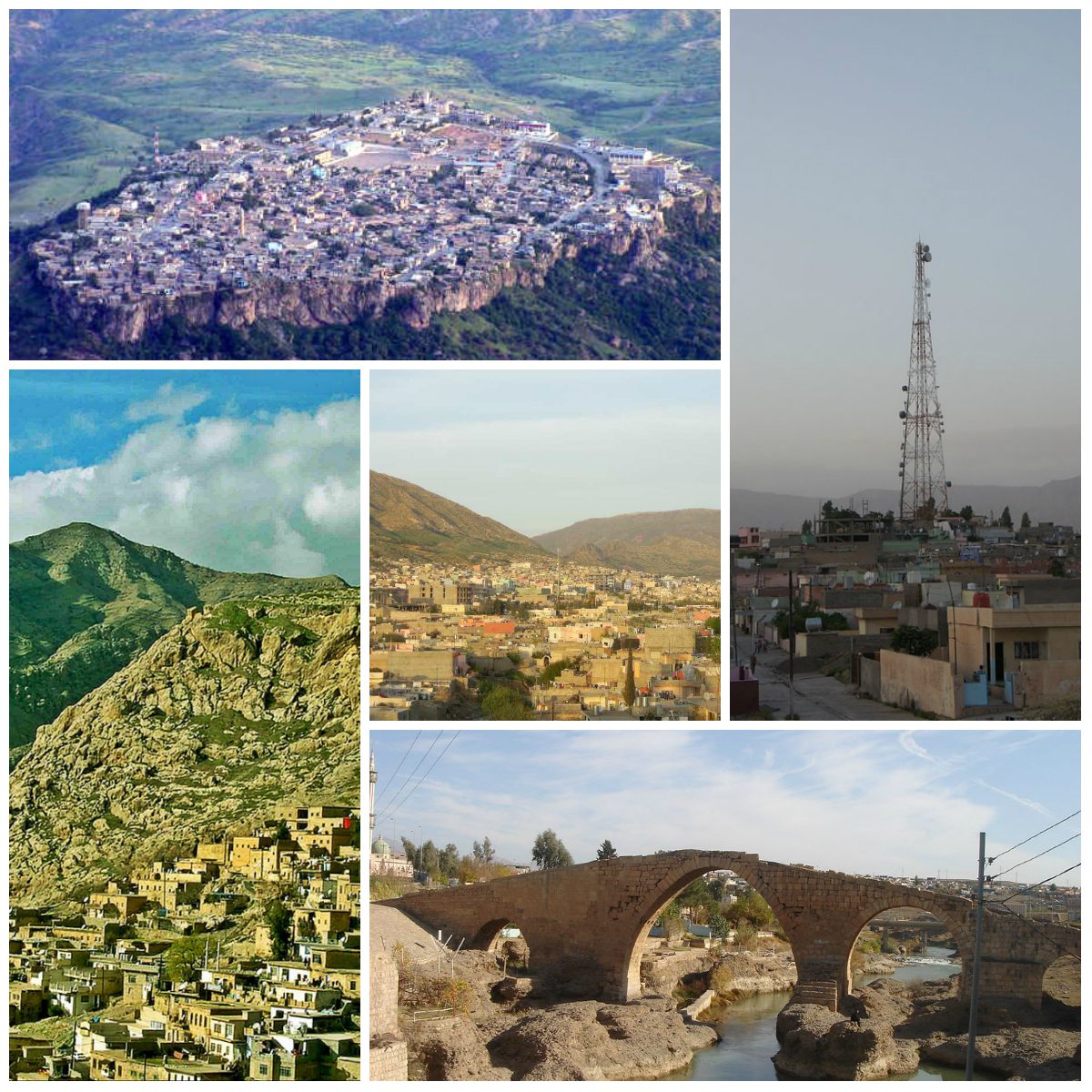

- Map of Dohuk Governorate

- Location in Kurdistan Region, Iraq Duhok Governorate (Iraq)
- Country: Iraq
- Region: Kurdistan Region
- Established: 27 May 1969
- Seat: Duhok

Government
  - Governor: Ali Tatar (Kurdistan Democratic Party)
- Area: 10,955.91 km^{2} (4,230.10 sq mi)
- Population (2024 census): 1,599,871
  - Density: 146.0281/km^{2} (378.2111/sq mi)
- Time zone: AST (UTC+3)
- HDI (2024): 0.726 high · 5th of 18
- Website: duhokprovince.com

Duhok Governorate (Kurdish: پارێزگای دھۆک, Parêzgeha Dihok, Syriac: ܗܘܦܪܟܝܐ ܕܢܘܗܕܪܐ, romanized: Hoparkiya d’Nohadra, Arabic: محافظة دهوك, romanized: Muḥāfaẓat Dohūk) is a governorate in the semi-autonomous Kurdistan Region of Iraq. Its capital is the city of Duhok. It includes Zakho, near the Ibrahim Khalil border crossing with Şırnak Province, Turkey. It borders the Al-Hasakah Governorate of Syria. It was established on 27 May 1969, previously part of Nineveh Governorate.

The population of the governorate was counted at 1,599,871 in the 2024 census.

== Demographics ==
Duhok Governorate is mainly populated by Kurds with an Arab, Assyrian, and Armenian minority. Historically, there was a Jewish population in the region as well. The main religious groups are Muslims, Yazidis and Christians.

== Government ==
- Governor: Ali Tatar
- Deputy Governor: Majid Sayid Salih
- Governorate Council Chairman (PCC): Fehim Abdullah

== Districts ==
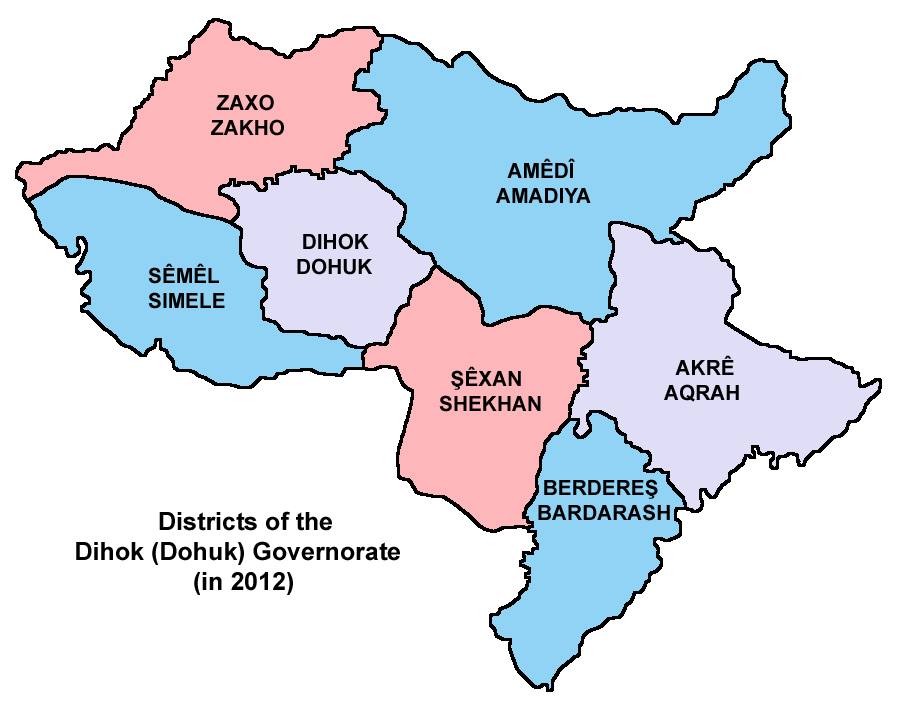
Districts of the Duhok Governorate

Duhok Governorate is divided into seven districts, four of which are officially part of Kurdistan Region, while three others are under de facto control of the Kurdistan Regional Government:

- Amedi District
- Duhok District
- Semel District
- Zakho District
- Akre District (disputed)
- Bardarash District (disputed)
- Shekhan District (disputed)

== Villages and towns ==
- Alikhan
- Araden
- Avzrog
- Badarash
- Bakhetme
- Bamarni
- Bebadi
- Dehi
- Dawodiya
- Duhok
- Harmash
- Hezany
- Khanke
- Kovli
- Sarsing
- Sharya
- Surya
- Zawita

== See also ==
- 2011 Duhok riots
- Duhok international airport
