= Subdistricts of Iraq =

Subdistricts (Arabic: ناحية, nahiyah), also referred to as tracts, are the fourth-level administrative division in Iraq.

Iraq is divided into 18 governorates (or muhafazah), which are divided into more than 130 districts (qada). Four of the governorates (Erbil, Sulaymaniyah, Duhok, and Halabja) are part of the semi-autonomous Kurdistan Region. Districts are divided into subdistricts.

Province	List	No. of districts	No. of subdistricts
Province of Al-Anbar	List of subdistricts in Al-Anbar	12	23
Province of Al-Basrah	List of subdistricts in Al-Basrah	11	17
Province of Al-Muthana	List of subdistricts in Al-Muthana	9	12
Province of Al-Qadisiyah	List of subdistricts in Al-Qadisiyah	13	15
Province of An-Najaf	List of subdistricts in An-Najaf	4	12
Province of Babil	List of subdistricts in Babil	7	19
Province of Baghdad	List of subdistricts in Baghdad	15	38
Province of Dhi Qar	List of subdistricts in Dhi Qar	15	23
Province of Diyala	List of subdistricts in Diyala	8	24
Province of Duhok	List of subdistricts in Duhok	8	29
Province of Erbil	List of subdistricts in Erbil	15	46
Province of Karbala	List of subdistricts in Karbala	6	7
Province of Kirkuk	List of subdistricts in Kirkuk	4	16
Province of Maysan	List of subdistricts in Maysan	7	15
Province of Nineveh	List of subdistricts in Nineveh	9	32
Province of Salah Al-Din	List of subdistricts in Salah Al-Din	11	25
Province of Sulaymaniyah	List of subdistricts in Sulaymaniyah	17	56
Province of Wasit	List of subdistricts in Wasit	9	19
Province of Halabja	List of subdistricts in Halabja	5	5
Total		185	433

== See also ==
- Governorates of Iraq
- Districts of Iraq
