= Amedi District =

Amedi District قەزای ئامێدی Navçeya Amêdî
- District
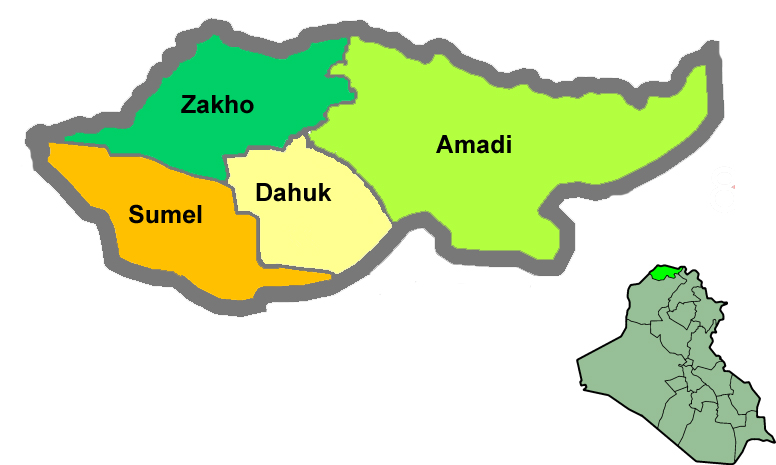

- Location within Iraq Location within Iraqi Kurdistan
- Country: Iraq
- Region: Kurdistan Region
- Governorate: Duhok Governorate
- Seat: Amedi

Population (2014)
  - Urban: 73,764
  - Rural: 34,334
- Time zone: UTC+3 (AST)
- Area code: +964 62

Amedi (or Amadiya) District (Kurdish: قەزای ئامێدی, romanized: Qezaye Amêdî, Arabic: قضاء العمادية, romanized: qaḍāʾ al-Emadiyah) is a district of Duhok Governorate in Kurdistan Region, Iraq. The administrative centre is Amedi.

== Subdistricts ==
The district has the following sub-districts:

- Amedi
- Bamarni
- Chamanke
- Deraluk
- Kani Masi
- Sarsing
