= Imre Schwaiger =

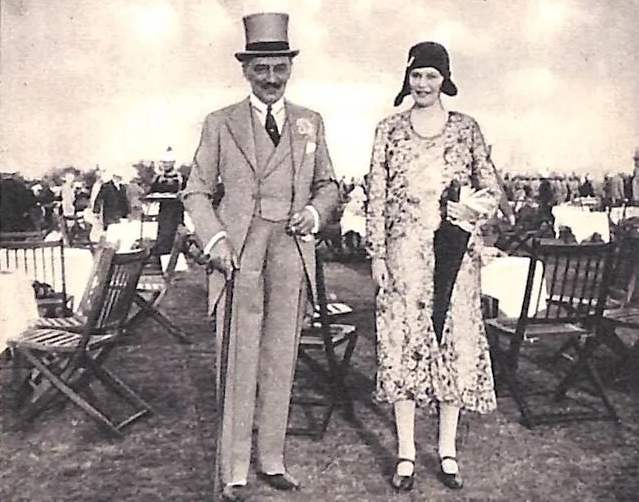
Imre Schwaiger and his daughter at a garden party of Lord Irwin in 1930

Imre George Maria Schwaiger (3 November 1868 – 24 June 1940) was a Hungarian-British art collector and trader who settled in India and developed a trade in Indian, Nepalese and Tibetan art and antiquities.

== Life and work ==
Schwaiger was born in Szeged, the son of merchant Károly Schweiger from Kecskemét and Fabritzky Janka. The family may have moved from the Nuremberg region. His brothers, József became a judge in Szeged, and István became a railway official. He studied in the Szeged commercial school and worked at Crédit Lyonnais in London from 1887. He moved to and worked in Simla. After meeting János Telléry who traded in gems and handicrafts in India, he became interested in jewels and art and joined his firm S. J. Tellery & Co. in 1895 began to develop an art trade business first in Bombay, then at Simla and then in Calcutta. After Telléry went bankrupt he worked for a Jain Backliwal family who also ran a store called the Indian Arts Palace. Manick Chand Backliwal (1894-1954) of the family later worked for Schwaiger. In 1910 Schwaiger started his own business in Delhi at Kashmir Gate. He married Nellie (1880-1938), daughter of the photographer Alfred Saché around 1898 and they had four children. He was involved in evaluating the value of gifts received by Lord Elgin from native rulers. While living in Simla he was associated with A.M. Jacob, a dealer of gems and art. Jacob was the model of "Lurgan Sahib" in Rudyard Kipling's "Kim". Jacob went bankrupt in 1891 and his business was bought by Schwaiger. He dealt in art with Indian princes, American and European collectors. E.B. Havell examined his collections while studying art from Nepal. His regular customers included the Aga Khan. He supplied the British government during the coronation of King George V in 1911. During World War I, he was in London and although on a list of citizens of hostile nations, he was exempted by Lord Kitchener who was a collector of oriental swords, many supplied by Schwaiger. After World War I he took British citizenship. He also collaborated with Louis Cartier. The British Museum obtained several objects from him and he also donated to Hungarian Museums including the Ferenc Hopp museum. He was termed by the first director Zoltán Felvinczi Takács as the second founder of the Hopp museum, and for which he received a Hungarian Order of Merit (Class II) in 1931. He collected Gandhara sculpture and was responsible for the development of worldwide interest in Tibetan and Nepalese art. He died in Delhi and was buried in the Nicholson cemetery.

Schwaiger's first daughter Irma Gwendolin (1898-1981), married an army officer G. Charles Bryan (1900-1994) while the oldest son Leonard Imre Charles (1900-1940 went to Africa and his son Imre Leonard (b. 1930) served in the Royal Air Force. Another son Ernest Alfred Trevor (1902-1976) worked for Cartier in London and married actress Adela Helena (Adèle) Dixon (1908-1992). His youngest daughter Ilona (1905–1957) ran his business after his death but it did not last long. Some of the artefacts were bought by the Indian government after Independence for the National Museum in Delhi under Sir Mortimer Wheeler of the archaeological survey. Some were obtained by a private dealer named Bulwant Singh. Ilona died in Mussoorie where she tried to start a new business after unsuccessfully trying to start others in Canada and South Africa.
