= Berwari (East Syriac diocese) =

East Syriac diocese

Diocese of Berwari was an East Syriac diocese of the Church of the East, existing between the 16th and 20th centuries and covering the region of Berwari (in northern Iraq).

== The Nestorian diocese of Berwari ==
=== Early history ===
Before the 14th century the Berwari region, sometimes called Julmar (probably after the town of Julamerk) or Beth Tannura (the name of a large Jewish village in the Beduh valley) in Syriac colophons, was part of the diocese of Dasen. Nothing is known of the region's history in the 14th and 15th centuries, but a diocese of Berwari is mentioned in a manuscript of 1514 by the scribe Sabrishoʿ bar Galalin, 'brother of the bishop Yahballaha of Julmar'. A manuscript of 1575 contains several poems composed at an unknown date by the metropolitan Sabrishoʿ of Berwari.

=== After the Chaldean schism ===
After the schism of 1552 the region appears to have been contested by the Eliya and Shimun lines for several decades. Manuscripts were copied at Alqosh in 1562 and in the Berwari monastery of Mar Qayyoma in 1602 by bishop Yahballaha of the Pinyanish village of Azyanish which mention the patriarchs Eliya VI and Eliya VII respectively. Bishop Yahballaha of Beth Tannura, also dependent on the patriarch Eliya VII and almost certainly the same man, is mentioned in the report of 1607. On the other hand, a metropolitan Sabrishoʿ 'of Julmar' is also mentioned in the report of 1607, almost certainly to be identified with the metropolitan Sabrishoʿ of Berwari listed among the hierarchy of Shemʿon X in the report of 1610.

There are no further references to bishops of Berwari for more than a century, but the region was claimed by Mar Shimon XI Ishoʿyahb in 1653. In 1731 a manuscript was commissioned from Alqosh by bishop Yahballaha, Therefore, suggesting that he was possibly dependent on the Mosul patriarch Eliya XII.

The metropolitan Ishoʿyahb of 'Beth Tannura, who was dependent on the Qodshanis patriarchate, is mentioned in manuscripts dating from 1817, 1829 and 1831. Considering those dates, he was probably the "elderly metropolitan Ishoʿyahb of Berwari" mentioned by British missionaries Ainsworth in 1841 and Badger in 1850.

Ishoʿyahb, already elderly in 1850, probably died shortly afterwards. By 1868 Berwari had three bishops: Ishoʿyahb's young natar kursyas Yahballaha and Ishoʿyahb, who had been jointly consecrated after his death and resided together in the same house at Dure, and a bishop named Yonan, who resided in the village of ʿAqri. A petition in 1868 to the Archbishop of Canterbury was signed by Yonan 'of ʿAqri' and Ishoʿyahb 'of Dure', and all three men were mentioned by the Anglican missionary Edward Cutts in 1877. Yahballaha died before 1884, but Ishoʿyahb and Yonan are included in Maclean's hierarchy in 1884, and Riley's in 1888. Yonan is last mentioned in 1903 as a Catholic sympathiser by Rhétoré. Ishoʿyahb converted to Chaldean Catholicism on 31 March 1903 in a public ceremony in ʿAmadiya, but reverted to Nestorianism shortly afterwards. In 1907 he was deposed by Shimun XIX Benyamin, who consecrated the eighteen-year-old Yalda Yahballaha as bishop of Berwari in his place. The consecration of a 'boy of slight education' offended the Anglican Mission, which was trying to persuade the young patriarch to reform the clergy and episcopate, but it did not protest. Yalda Yahballaha was one of the few surviving members of the Qudshanis hierarchy after the First World War, and remained bishop of Berwari until his death in 1950.

The episcopal family of Mar Yahballaha was maintained by Mar Yosip Khanisho. After Yalda's death, two nephews Andreos and Shallita aspired to the office, but neither was old enough in 1951 to be consecrated. The see remained vacant for six years; then Mar Khananisho consecrated Andreos (at age 19) as Bishop. Andreos Yahballaha served as Bishop until his death in June 1973 at the age of 35. It has been theorized that his young death was due to assassination as a result of the role he played in the Kurdish wars against the Iraqi government.

However, Andreos consecration caused division in the community as some expected Shallita to be consecrated due to his seniority. Shallita and followers did not want to become Catholic, but aspired a union between Syriacs and Assyrians. Timothaus Shallita Yahballaha ended up joining the Syriac Orthodox Church as a result, and was consecrated Archbishop by Patriarch Ignatius Yaqub III on October 23, 1958, in Beirut. However, he did not join the Holy Synod and still kept contact with the Patriarchate of the Assyrian Church of the East and even returned to Barwari-Bala after his consecration and stayed there until war broke out in 1963, relocating to the Patriarchate in Damascus. In 1967 he was invited to Germany by the World Council of Churches, where he has remained since. Shallita ceased his relationship with the Syriac Orthodox Church later on. In 1969 he joined the Ancient Church of the East and recognized Mar Addai II as patriarch, joining its holy synod in 1995, being appointed as Metropolitan of Europe with his see in Mainz-Kastel. He also played a prominent role in Assyrian refugee aid for well over 20 years, and advocated successfully for Assyrians looking to gain asylum in Europe.

In 1999, Mar Isaac Yousif was consecrated bishop by Mar Dinkha IV, assigning him the new Diocese of Dohuk-Arbil, which has been considered a modern revival of the diocese of Berwari.

== Statistics ==
The diocese of Berwari included twenty-seven East Syriac villages in Berwari itself and in the adjacent Sapna and Nerwa districts, containing 348 families, 18 priests and 20 churches in 1850 (Badger). In 1841, according to Ainsworth, it also included the Berwari villages of Alqoshta, Musakan, Robara and Dargeli, the Sapna villages of Meristak and Inishk (a Chaldean village shortly afterwards), and the Zibar village of Erdil. Musakan, though not included in his statistics, was also mentioned as a village in the diocese of Berwari in 1843 by Badger, in which a number of villagers from the Lower Tiyari town of Ashitha had taken refuge after the massacre earlier in the year.

A recently published book by Youel Baaba has supplied the Syriac names of the villages in the diocese of Berwari.

East Syriac communities in the diocese of Berwari, 1850

Name of Village	Name in Syriac	No. of Families	No. of Priests	No. of Churches	Name of Village	Name in Syriac	No. of Families	No. of Priests	No. of Churches
ʿAmadiya	ܥܡܝܕܝܐ	25	1	0	ʿAina d'Nune		20	1	1
Deiri		12	0	1	Hayyat		5	1	1
Komane	ܟܘܡܢܐ	13	0	1	Beth Shmiyaye		6	1	1
Dirgini		40	2	1	Dure		20	4	2
Bilejan		8	0	0	Helwa	ܗܠܘܐ	7	1	1
Bebadi		20	1	1	Malaktha	ܡܠܐܟܬܐ	5	0	0
Hamziyya	ܗܡܙܝܐ	6	0	1	ʿAqri		20	1	1
Dehe		10	0	1	Beth Baloka		10	1	1
Tarshish		20	1	1	Hayyis		15	1	1
Jdida		5	0	0	Qaru		10	1	1
Beth Kolke		5	0	0	ʿAlih		2	0	1
Tutha Shamaya		10	0	0	Bash		12	1	1
Maya		15	0	0	Wila		10	1	1
Derishke		15	0	0	Total		348	18	20
