= Alexander Jacob =

Alexander Jacob may refer to:

- Marius Jacob (Alexandre Jacob, 1879–1954), French anarchist illegalist
- Alexander Malcolm Jacob (1849–1921), diamond and gemstone trader in Shimla
- Alexander Jacob (police officer) (born 1955), Indian police officer in Kerala
