= Komane, Iraq =

Komane
- Village
- Location in Iraq Komane (Iraqi Kurdistan)
- Coordinates: 37.084°N 43.524°E
- Country: Iraq
- Region: Kurdistan Region
- Governorate: Duhok Governorate
- District: Amedi District
- Sub-district: Amedi

Komane (Arabic: كـومـاني, Kurdish: كوانێ, Syriac: ܟܘܡܢܐ) (Note: Alternatively transliterated as Komana, Kowane, or Kwane.) is a village in Duhok Governorate in Kurdistan Region, Iraq. It is located in the Sapna valley in Amedi District. Komane is the sister village of Dere.

In the village, there are churches of Mart Maryam and Mart Shmune.

== History ==
At Komane, the church of Mar Ephrem has been dated to the Sasanian period (224–651), whilst the monastery of Mart Maryam is believed to have been founded in the 4th-century AD. There was also a monastery of Mar Quryaqos, which was constructed in the 8th-century AD. The village itself is attested in the 10th-century Life of Rabban Joseph Busnaya in which its inhabitants are noted as adherents of the Church of the East. Abdisho, Archbishop of Koma, likely Komane, is attested in a letter from the Chaldean Catholic Patriarch Shimun IX Dinkha to Pope Gregory XIII in 1580.

In 1850, 13–20 families inhabited Komane and were served by the church of Mart Maryam as part of the Church of the East archdiocese of Berwari. However, most of the village's population had joined the Chaldean Catholic Church by 1913, in which year there were 60 Chaldean Catholic Assyrians at Komane served by the chapel of Our Lady of Light and Life as part of the Chaldean Catholic Eparchy of Amadiya.

The village was inhabited by 19 people with four families in 1938. The population of Komane grew and the Iraqi census of 1957 counted 550 people. In 1961, the village had 150 families and a primary school was built in 1963. Amidst the First Iraqi–Kurdish War, Komane was looted and burnt down in an attack by pro-regime Zebari Kurds led by Zubir Muhammad Zebari in 1965 which resulted in the death of one villager and forced the survivors to take refuge in neighbouring villages.

The Iraqi government forcibly resettled 20 Assyrian families from the village of Wela in the Nerwa Rekan sub-district and 80 Kurdish families at Komane in 1977. A Church of the East church of Mart Maryam was constructed in 1978 for the Assyrians from Wela. In 1996, it was reported that Kurds had illegally confiscated Assyrian villagers' land.

By 2011, the Supreme Committee of Christian Affairs had constructed 36 houses, restored 27 houses, and built the church of Mart Shmune. Komane was inhabited by approximately 480 Assyrians in 2012, of whom 200 belonged to the Assyrian Church of the East and 280 were Chaldean Catholics. Displaced Assyrian families found refuge at Komane, and received humanitarian aid from the Assyrian Aid Society in 2014. On 12 June 2019, the village was struck by Turkish airstrikes. As of 2021, Komane is inhabited by 210 Assyrians in 53 families.

== Bibliography ==
- Donabed, Sargon George (2015). Reforging a Forgotten History: Iraq and the Assyrians in the Twentieth Century. Edinburgh University Press.
- Eshoo, Majed (2004). The Fate Of Assyrian Villages Annexed To Today's Dohuk Governorate In Iraq And The Conditions In These Villages Following The Establishment Of The Iraqi State In 1921 (PDF). Translated by Mary Challita.
- Wilmshurst, David (2000). The Ecclesiastical Organisation of the Church of the East, 1318–1913. Peeters Publishers.
