= Cevizli, Çukurca =

Village in Hakkari Province, Turkey

Cevizli
- Village
- Location within Turkey
- Coordinates: 37.3333°N 43.717°E
- Country: Turkey
- Province: Hakkâri
- District: Çukurca
- Population (2023): 59
- Time zone: UTC+3 (TRT)

Cevizli (Kurdish: Gûzereş) is a village in the Çukurca District in Hakkâri Province in Turkey. The village is populated by Kurds of the Pinyanişî tribe and had a population of 59 in 2023.

The four hamlets of Başak (Gundik), Güven (Pîrî), Sütlü (Xanê sê gund) and Yaylak (Mezrî) are attached to Cevizli. Güven and Sütlü are unpopulated.

Cevizli was depopulated in the 1990s during the Kurdish–Turkish conflict.

== History ==
The village of Gûzereş was the only Kurdish village in the valley of Tkhuma prior to Sayfo, the current hamlets of Başak (Gundik), Sütlü (Xanê sê gund), and Yaylak (Mezrî) were Assyrian villages prior to World War I. They existed under the names Gundiktha, Khani and Mazra'a respectively.

In 1698, a scribe in Qudshanis named Abraham was from the village of Mazra'a. Also, in 1785 a manuscript was copied by deacon Hajo of Gundiktha. Both are notable manuscript references to the villages.

The village of Khani was established toward the end of the 19th century.

The village of Mazra'a contained the famous church of Mar Pethiōn, while the village of Gundiktha had the church of Mar Khananya.

== Population ==
Population history of the village from 1965 to 2023:

Population
Year	Pop.	±%
1965	692	—
1980	1,125	+62.6%
1990	985	−12.4%
2000	0	−100.0%
2011	42	—
2017	39	−7.1%
2022	36	−7.7%
2023	59	+63.9%

=== Pre-Assyrian Genocide Population ===
The village of Gûzereş itself was inhabited by 50 Kurdish families in 1914 according to Agha Petros.

The following Assyrian populations are given by Bagder (1850) and Cutts (1877)

Gundiktha: 110 families (1850), 150 families (1877)

Mazra'a: 130 families (1850), 180 families (1877)

Khani: 50 families (1909)
