= Akkaya, Çukurca =

Village in Hakkari Province, Turkey

Akkaya
- Village
- Location within Turkey
- Coordinates: 37.348°N 43.464°E
- Country: Turkey
- Province: Hakkâri
- District: Çukurca
- Population (2023): 755
- Time zone: UTC+3 (TRT)

Akkaya (Kurdish: Serispî; Syriac: Sārāspīdōn) (Note: Alternatively transliterated as Sarespido, Sarispedo, Sarpsidon, or Serspeedho.) is a village in the Çukurca District in Hakkâri Province in Turkey. The village is populated by Kurds of the Alan tribe and had a population of 755 in 2023.

The four hamlets of Dağdibi (Cemêhuyu), Sarıyer (Sîyavik), Dikenli (Bite) and Kunaklı (Barzan) are attached to Akkaya. Dikenli and Kunaklı are unpopulated.

== History ==
Sārāspīdōn (today called Akkaya) was historically inhabited by Assyrian people and located in the Upper Tyari district in the Hakkari region. It had two churches and was served as part of the diocese of the Patriarch of the Church of the East. According to the English missionary George Percy Badger, the village was inhabited by 80 Assyrian families in 1850, all of whom belonged to the Church of the East and were served by two priests. Badger recorded that the villagers possessed 3000 sheep, 150 oxen, and 160 muskets; he also noted lead was mined at the village for use in the production of bullets.

By 1877, there were 50 Assyrians families at Sārāspīdōn with two priests when visited by Edward Lewes Cutts. There were 100 Assyrian families in 1914, as per the list presented to the Paris Peace Conference by the Assyro-Chaldean delegation. Amidst the Sayfo, Sārāspīdōn was attacked and destroyed by Turks and Kurds led by the vali of Mosul, Haydar Bey, on 11 June 1915 although most of the villagers were able to flee.

== Population ==
Population history of the village from 2007 to 2023:

Population
| Year | Pop. | ±% |
|---|---|---|
| 2007 | 674 | — |
| 2012 | 877 | +30.1% |
| 2017 | 885 | +0.9% |
| 2022 | 808 | −8.7% |
| 2023 | 755 | −6.6% |

== Bibliography ==
- Aboona, Hirmis (2008). Assyrians, Kurds, and Ottomans: Intercommunal Relations on the Periphery of the Ottoman Empire. Cambria Press.
- Badger, George Percy (1852). The Nestorians and Their Rituals: With the Narrative of a Mission to Mesopotamia and Coordistan in 1842-1844, and of a Late Visit to Those Countries in 1850; Also, Researches Into the Present Condition of the Syrian Jacobites, Papal Syrians, and Chaldeans, and an Inquiry Into the Religious Tenets of the Yezeedees. Vol. 1.
- Gaunt, David (2006). Massacres, Resistance, Protectors: Muslim-Christian Relations in Eastern Anatolia during World War I. Gorgias Press.
- Wilmshurst, David (2000). The Ecclesiastical Organisation of the Church of the East, 1318–1913 (PDF). Peeters Publishers.
- Yacoub, Joseph (2016). Year of the Sword: The Assyrian Christian Genocide, A History. Translated by James Ferguson. Oxford University Press.
