= Dere, Iraq =

Dere
- Village
- Location in Iraq Dere (Iraqi Kurdistan)
- Coordinates: 37°05′51.5″N 43°31′11.6″E
- Country: Iraq
- Region: Kurdistan Region
- Governorate: Duhok Governorate
- District: Amedi District
- Sub-district: Amedi

Dere (Kurdish: دێرێ) (Note: Alternatively transliterated as Deiri.) is a village in Duhok Governorate in Kurdistan Region, Iraq. It is located in the Sapna valley in Amedi District. Dere is the sister village of Komane.

In the village, there is a church of Mar Abdisho.

== Etymology ==
The name of the village (Syriac: Dere, "monasteries" or "dwellings") has been argued to refer to the presence of the monasteries of Mar Abdisho and of Mar Qardagh.

== History ==
The Church of the East monastery of Mar Abdisho at Dere was founded in the 4th-century AD atop a hill above the village known as Bshīsh. At one point, it was served by 42 monks who resided in nearby caves. It has been suggested that the monastery was the seat of the metropolitan bishop Abdisho of Koma in 1580. A colophon of 1586 mentions that the monastery had been damaged by a recent earthquake and subsequently restored. It was the only monastery in the region mentioned in reports in 1607 and 1610 but had probably been abandoned by 1753, in which year it was granted to the Dominican mission under Francesco Turriani by the governor of Amedi. The Dominicans subsequently restored the monastery in 1779.

The English missionary George Percy Badger noted the monastery was partially ruined when he first visited in 1843 but had been restored before he returned in 1850, at which time he recorded the village was inhabited by 12–18 families that were served by one functioning church as part of the Church of the East archdiocese of Berwari. Badger also attested that the monastery was revered by both Christians and Muslims. By 1913, Dere was counted amongst the thirteen villages in the Sapna valley that had joined the Chaldean Catholic Church. The village was inhabited by 425 Assyrians in 45 families in 1938 according to a report by the League of Nations.

The Iraqi census of 1957 recorded the population of Dere as 323 people. It was inhabited by 100 families in 60 households in 1961, however the population began to decline as the villagers took refuge elsewhere due to the Iraqi–Kurdish conflict. The monastery of Mar Abdisho, which had been destroyed by an Iraqi government airstrike amidst the First Iraqi–Kurdish War in 1961 and rebuilt in 1984, was destroyed alongside the village in 1987 by the Iraqi government during the Anfal campaign, forcing the remaining 70 families to flee. After the Assyrians had fled the village, Kurds from Meristak and other neighbouring villages seized their land.

The monastery of Mar Abdisho was rebuilt again in 1995. By 2011, the Supreme Committee of Christian Affairs had constructed 13 houses at Dere and provided an electrical generator. The village was inhabited by approximately 365 Assyrians in 2012, of whom 250 belonged to the Assyrian Church of the East and 115 were Chaldean Catholics. As of 2021, Dere is inhabited by 12 Assyrians in 3 families.

== Bibliography ==
- Donabed, Sargon George (2015). Reforging a Forgotten History: Iraq and the Assyrians in the Twentieth Century. Edinburgh University Press.
- Eshoo, Majed (2004). The Fate Of Assyrian Villages Annexed To Today's Dohuk Governorate In Iraq And The Conditions In These Villages Following The Establishment Of The Iraqi State In 1921 (PDF). Translated by Mary Challita.
- Wilmshurst, David (2000). The Ecclesiastical Organisation of the Church of the East, 1318–1913. Peeters Publishers.
