= Çığlı, Çukurca =

Village in Hakkari Province, Turkey

Çığlı
- Village
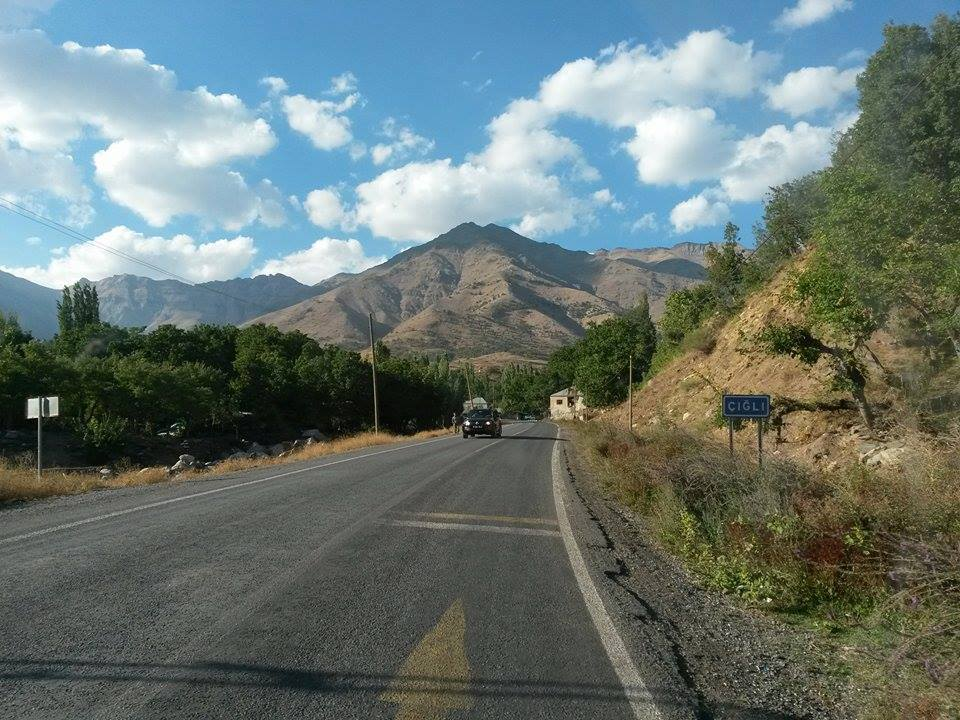
- Village entry

- Location within Turkey
- Coordinates: 37.332°N 43.380°E
- Country: Turkey
- Province: Hakkâri
- District: Çukurca
- Population (2023): 1,911
- Time zone: UTC+3 (TRT)

Çığlı (Kurdish: Aşut; Syriac: ܐܫܝܬܐ, romanized: Āshīṯā) (Note: Alternatively transliterated as Ashīthā, Ashita, Achita, or Asheetha.) is a village in Hakkâri Province in southeastern Turkey. It is located in the district of Çukurca District and the historical region of Hakkari. The village is populated by Kurds of the Kaşuran tribe and had a population of 1,911 in 2023.

== Etymology ==
The Syriac and Turkish names of the village, Ashitha and Çığlı, respectively, both translate to "avalanche". Ashitha is derived from "ašīthā" ("avalanche" in Syriac), whilst Çığlı is likely a combination of "çığ" ("avalanche" in Turkish) and the adjectival suffix -li.

== History ==
The church of Mar Saba was constructed in the 4th century. Ashitha was formerly exclusively inhabited by Assyrians, and was the centre of the lower Tyari district, and a rayyat (vassal) of the ashiret (free men) Tyari clan. It was formed by an aggregation of the villages of Jemane, Jemane Tahtaita, Mata d'Umra-Hatibet, Isrur, and Merwita. The village served as one of two places in the Hakkari region designated by the Patriarch of the Church of the East as a location for the resolution of disputes under the arbitration of a malik. In the village, there were churches of Mar Gewargis and Mar Saba.

A large mission station was built at Ashitha by the American Protestant missionary Asahel Grant in September 1842. By the end of the month, he had also built a school with 20 pupils, and eight mule loads of Syriac books had arrived from Mosul. The size and position of the mission station atop an isolated hill, commanding the whole valley, unnerved Kurds and Turkish authorities, and sparked a series of events that led to the Kurdish massacres in Hakkari in 1843. Although Ashitha was spared after the village clergymen shamasha (deacon) Hinno and kasha (priest) Jindo had written to the Kurdish emir Bedir Khan Beg to pledge their allegiance and support, a number of villagers fled and took refuge in the village of Mūsākān in the Barwari Bala region.

Many villagers were killed during the massacres of 1846, and the mission station, which had been converted into a Kurdish fortress, was destroyed during the Ottoman suppression of the revolt of Bedir Khan in 1847. The village was inhabited by an estimated 2500 Assyrians with 400 families, all of whom were adherents of the Church of the East and were served by four priests and one functioning church in 1850 according to the English missionary George Percy Badger. Badger recorded that the villagers possessed 20,000 sheep, 1500 oxen, and 500 muskets. The population dropped to 300 Assyrian families with 20 priests when visited by Edward Lewes Cutts in 1877. The village was frequently visited by the Church of the East patriarchs Shimun XVII Abraham (r. 1820–1861) and his successor Shimun XVIII Rubil (r. 1861–1903). In the late 19th century, Ashitha was targeted for conversion by Catholic missionaries. Throughout the century, the village had been a major centre of manuscript production.

Ashitha gave its name to the kaza of Chal and Ashitha in the sanjak of Hakkari in the Van Vilayet, which was populated by 200 Jews, 840 Turks, 11,000 Kurds, and 32,000 Assyrians, for a total of 43,890 people in 1900. In 1913, 350 Chaldean Catholics inhabited Ashitha, and were served by one priest as part of the archdiocese of Van. It was claimed in 1913 there was an incumbent Church of the East bishop of Ashitha, however, this is unlikely to be genuine. Amidst the Sayfo in the First World War, Ashitha was attacked by Turks and Kurds under Rashid Bey, Emir of Lower Barwari, on 11 June 1915, and the village was defended under the leadership of Zenkho of Bet Hiob and Lazar of Ashita. Ashitha fell after a day of fighting, and its population of 500 families fled into the mountains.

Villagers returned to rebuild in the early 1920s, but were expelled to Iraq by the Turkish government, and some founded the village of Sarsing in 1924. By 1933, a number of villagers had settled at Kani Balavi, and 15 former inhabitants, with 3 families, settled at Bandwaya by 1938. Ashitha has since been Turkified to Çığlı, and is now fully populated by Kurds of the Kaşuran tribe.

== Population ==
Population history of the village from 2007 to 2023:

Population
Year	Pop.	±%
2007	1,685	—
2012	2,793	+65.8%
2017	2,642	−5.4%
2023	1,911	−27.7%

== Bibliography ==
- Andrews, Peter Alfred; Benninghaus, Rüdiger (1989). Ethnic Groups in the Republic of Turkey. Reichert.
- Badger, George Percy (1852). The Nestorians and Their Rituals: With the Narrative of a Mission to Mesopotamia and Coordistan in 1842-1844, and of a Late Visit to Those Countries in 1850; Also, Researches Into the Present Condition of the Syrian Jacobites, Papal Syrians, and Chaldeans, and an Inquiry Into the Religious Tenets of the Yezeedees. Vol. 1.
- Becker, Adam H. (2015). Revival and Awakening: American Evangelical Missionaries in Iran and the Origins of Assyrian Nationalism. University of Chicago Press.
- Borghero, Roberta (2006). "Some features of the North Eastern Neo-Aramaic dialect of Ashitha". In Pier Giorgio Borbone; Alessandro Mengozzi; Mauro Tosco (eds.). Linguistic and oriental studies in honour of Fabrizio A. Pennacchietti. Otto Harrassowitz Verlag. pp. 109–121.
- Donabed, Sargon George (2015). Reforging a Forgotten History: Iraq and the Assyrians in the Twentieth Century. Edinburgh University Press.
- Joseph, John (2000). The Modern Assyrians of the Middle East: A History of Their Encounter with Western Christian Missions, Archaeologists, and Colonial Powers. Brill.
- Jwaideh, Wadie (2006). The Kurdish National Movement: Its Origins and Development. Syracuse University Press.
- O'Flynn, Thomas (2017). The Western Christian Presence in the Russias and Qājār Persia, c.1760–c.1870. Brill.
- Stavridis, Stavros (2018). "Lady Surma: the pillar of the Assyrian nation, 1883–1975". In Hannibal Travis (ed.). The Assyrian Genocide: Cultural and Political Legacies. Routledge. pp. 191–217.
- Wilmshurst, David (2000). The Ecclesiastical Organisation of the Church of the East, 1318–1913 (PDF). Peeters Publishers.
- Yacoub, Joseph (2016). Year of the Sword: The Assyrian Christian Genocide, A History. Translated by James Ferguson. Oxford University Press.
- Yonan, Gabriele (1996). Lest We Perish: A Forgotten Holocaust : the Extermination of the Christian Assyrians in Turkey and Persia (PDF).
- Malik Ismail, Yaqo (1964). ܐܬܘܪ̈ܝܐ ܘܬܪܝ ܦܠܫ̈ܐ ܬܒܝܠܝ̈ܐ [Assyrians and Two World Wars] (in Syriac). p. 39.
