= Kazan, Çukurca =

Village in Hakkari Province, Turkey

Kazan
- Village
- Location within Turkey
- Coordinates: 37.300°N 43.636°E
- Country: Turkey
- Province: Hakkâri
- District: Çukurca
- Population (2023): 184
- Time zone: UTC+3 (TRT)

Kazan (Kurdish: Tîyar) is a village in the Çukurca District in Hakkâri Province in Turkey. It is populated by Kurds of the Jirkî tribe and had a population of 184 in 2023.

The hamlets of Benekli (Sîvsîdan) and Yaprak (Gise) are attached to Kazan. Benekli is unpopulated.

== History ==
The modern village of Kazan is centered on the historically Assyrian village of Rāgūlā d'Sālābakkān. also known as Salabagh. According to Badger, the village contained 120 families in 1850, in 1877 Cutts records 200 families in the village.

The village was the home of the chiefs of the Lower Tyareh tribe until 1909, hence the Kurdish name of the village "Tîyar".

== Population ==
Population history of the village from 2017 to 2023:

Population
Year	Pop.	±%
2017	10	—
2022	25	+150.0%
2023	184	+636.0%
