= Narlı, Çukurca =

Village in Hakkari Province, Turkey

Narlı
- Village
- Location within Turkey
- Coordinates: 37.264°N 43.597°E
- Country: Turkey
- Province: Hakkâri
- District: Çukurca
- Population (2023): 289
- Time zone: UTC+3 (TRT)

Narlı (Kurdish: Biyadir) is a village in the Çukurca District in Hakkâri Province in Turkey. The village is populated by Kurds of the Pinyanişî tribe and had a population of 289 in 2023.

The hamlets of Bulutlu (Beravî), Güllüce (Qesran) and Taşlık (Bêlata jorî) are attached to Narlı. Only Kaynaklı is populated.

== Population ==
Population history of the village from 2007 to 2023:

Population
Year	Pop.	±%
2007	137	—
2012	193	+40.9%
2017	227	+17.6%
2022	268	+18.1%
2023	289	+7.8%
