= Hamid Ibn Muhammad Ibn Raziq =

Hamid Ibn Muhammad Ibn Raziq (1783 – 1874), also known as Salil Ibn Raziq, was an Omani poet and historian and the author of a number of works, including the influential History of the Imams and Sayyids of Oman.

Ibn Raziq wrote his History on the request of Said Hamad Al Busaidy, a nephew of Said bin Sultan Al Busaidi, the Sultan of Muscat and it was completed on 12 December 1857. The original manuscript of Ibn Raziq's book was presented to English Anglican missionary and scholar of oriental studies, George Percy Badger FRGS in 1860 by the Sultan of Muscat at that time, Thuwaini bin Said.

Badger, a member of the council of the Haklyut Society, produced a translation of the History which was published by the society in 1871, including a number of notes and appendices. On Badger's death, the original manuscript was left to his wife, who donated it to the Cambridge University Library, and it has consequently not yet been published in Arabic.

== Work ==
Ibn Raziq's history of Oman covered the period CE 661–1856 and comprised three volumes, the first of which Badger did not translate as it consisted of 'elaborate genealogies of the Arab tribes of Yemen'. The second two volumes detail the history of Oman from the Julanda bin Masud to Said bin Sultan's death at sea on his way to Zanzibar in October 1856. Badger omitted a number of 'irrelevant episodes and laudatory poems' from his translation.

Ibn Raziq's full name is given in the book as Hamid bin Muhammad bin Razik bin Bakhi, 'an Ibadhy by religion, and a native of the town of Nakhl'. His original Arabic title for the book translates to A Plain and Authentic Exposition of the Chronicles of the Seyyids of the Al Bu Saidi.

A celebrated figure in Oman, the 150th anniversary of his death was included in the program of UNESCO's 42nd Session. Ibn Raziq's other works in Arabic, perhaps ironically given his greatest work is only available in English, have not been translated into English, including his The Clear Victory of the House of Busaid.
