= Çağlayan, Çukurca =

Village in Hakkari Province, Turkey

Çağlayan
- Village
- Location within Turkey
- Coordinates: 37.288°N 43.819°E
- Country: Turkey
- Province: Hakkâri
- District: Çukurca
- Population (1997): 0
- Time zone: UTC+3 (TRT)

Çağlayan (Kurdish: Erbuş, Syriac: Erbesh) is a village in the Çukurca District in Hakkâri Province in Turkey. The village has been depopulated since the 1990s.

The hamlets of Küçükköy (Helalî) and Tepecik (Kurbe) are attached to the village.

== History ==
The village was formerly populated by Assyrians and located in the Raikan district. It consisted of 20 families, one priest and four churches in 1850. In 1877, the town had 20 families, one priest and two churches. The village was subsequently settled by Kurds of the Ertoşî tribe after Sayfo.

In 1994, the village was forcibly evacuated by the Turkish military. The village was subsequently declared a forbidden zone and the locals, who were dispersed to surrounding areas, were not allowed to return. In 1998, four Iraqi jets flew near the village and bombed the area claiming that they were targeting Kurdish rebels. The bombings caused no casualties.

== Population ==
The village has been unpopulated since the 1990s.

Population
Year	Pop.	±%
1965	381	—
1985	833	+118.6%
1997	0	−100.0%
