= Kavuşak, Çukurca =

Village in Hakkari Province, Turkey

Kavuşak
- Village
- Location within Turkey
- Coordinates: 37.290°N 43.748°E
- Country: Turkey
- Province: Hakkâri
- District: Çukurca
- Population (1997): 0
- Time zone: UTC+3 (TRT)

Kavuşak (Kurdish: Bilêcan) is a village in the Çukurca District in Hakkâri Province in Turkey. The village was depopulated in 1995.

== History ==
The village was populated by Kurds of the Pinyanişî tribe and was the center of the tribe. It was emptied by the Turkish military in 1995, and the locals relocated to Yüksekova. Entry to the village was subsequently restricted and it became a military post.

== Population ==
Population history from 1965 until 1997.

Population
Year	Pop.	±%
1965	674	—
1985	833	+23.6%
1997	0	−100.0%
