= Dooreh, Iraq =

Dooreh
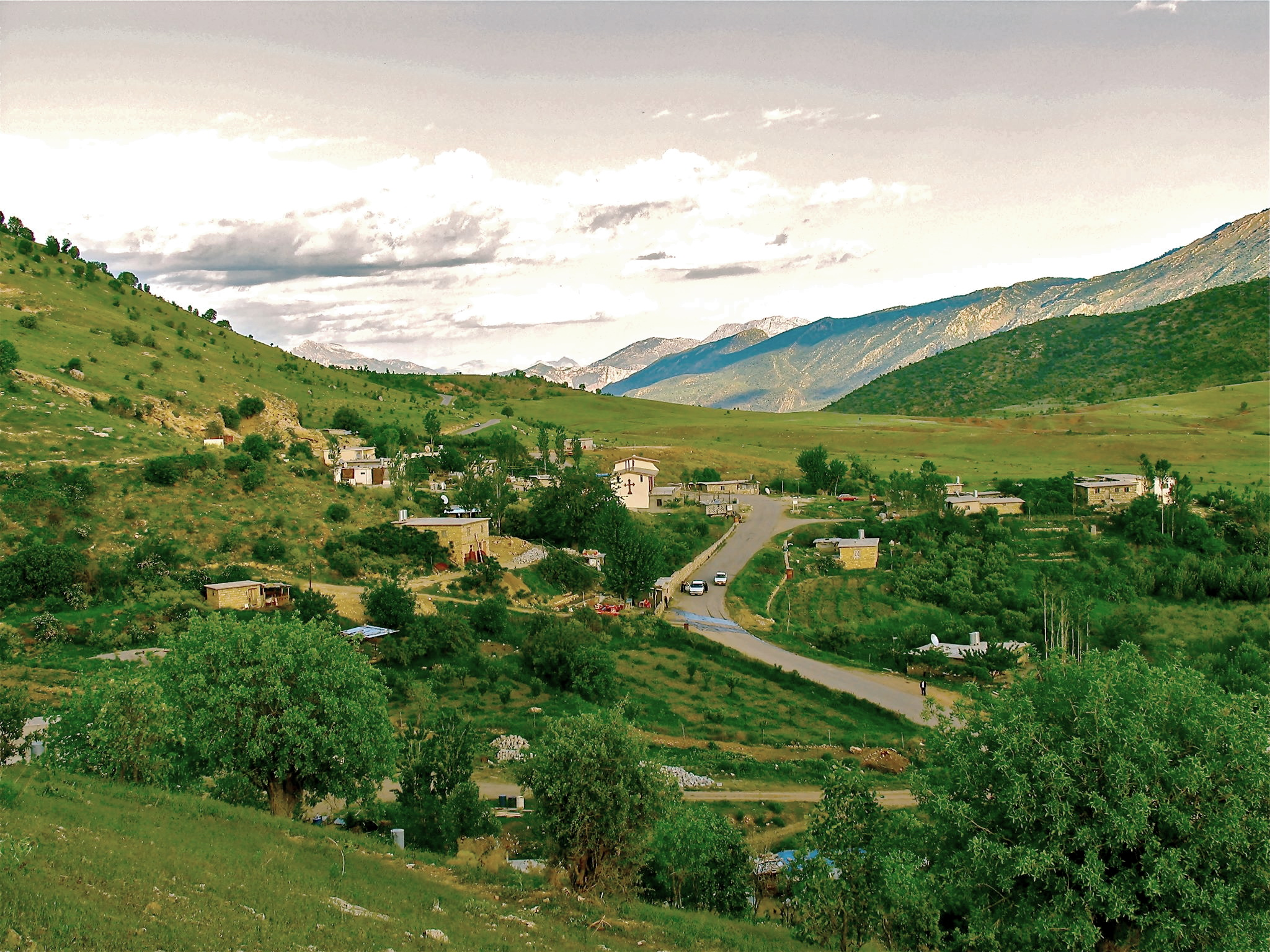

- Location in Iraq Dooreh (Iraqi Kurdistan)
- Coordinates: 37°13′24″N 43°28′7″E
- Country: Iraq
- Region: Kurdistan Region
- Governorate: Dohuk Governorate
- District: Amadiya District

Dooreh is a village in Dohuk Governorate in Kurdistan Region, Iraq. (Note: Alternatively transliterated as Dūre, Dore, Dura, or Doore. (Kurdish: دورێ; Syriac: ܕܘܪܐ).) It is located near the Iraq–Turkey border in the Amadiya District and the historical region of Barwari. In the village, there is a church of Mar Gewargis, and the ruins of the monastery of Mar Qayyoma. There was previously two shrines dedicated to Mart Maryam and Mar Apius and four cemeteries.

== Etymology ==
It is suggested that the name of the village is derived from "dūru(m)" ("fortress, wall" in Akkadian).

== History ==
The remains of a fortress nearby Dooreh have been dated to the early period of Assyria in the late third millennium BC, and likely inspired the village's name. The monastery of Mar Qayyoma was founded in the 4th-century AD, and the church of Mar Gewargis was first constructed in 909. The monastery of Mar Qayyoma is first mentioned in the mentioned in the 10th-century Life of Rabban Joseph Busnaya, and had become the seat of the Church of the East diocese of Barwari by 1610. Dooreh itself is mentioned in a manuscript of 1683. In 1850, 20-40 Church of the East families inhabited Dooreh, and were served by two functioning churches and four priests.

Prior to the First World War, Dooreh was populated by 200 Assyrians, who were forced to flee under the leadership of Agha Petros to the vicinity of Urmia in Iran, amidst the Assyrian genocide. Whilst in Iran, 90 villagers died, and 30 women and children were either killed or abducted, and the survivors were settled at the refugee camp at Baqubah in 1918. After residing there for two years, 90 people eventually returned to Dooreh. Dooreh was temporarily deserted again in the early 1930s due to the conflict between the Turkish government and the Kurdish Emir of Barwari. 35 families inhabited the village in 1938, and the population of Dooreh was recorded as 296 people in 1957.

At the onset of the First Iraqi–Kurdish War in 1961, 75 families in 40 houses resided at Dooreh, and the village was damaged by a napalm attack during the war in 1968. Despite this damage, the population increased to 100 families in 75 houses by 1978, in which year on 8 August the village was destroyed by the Iraqi government, and much of its population was forcibly resettled at Batifa. The village's destruction was total, as all houses, churches, farms, and orchards were obliterated. In the aftermath of the 1991 uprisings in Iraq, 30 families returned to Dooreh, and the church of Mar Gewargis was rebuilt in 1995 with support from the Evangelical-Lutheran Church in Württemberg.

By 2011, the Supreme Committee of Christian Affairs had constructed 37 houses and a hall, and the village was inhabited by 250 adherents of the Assyrian Church of the East in the following year. Dooreh was struck by Turkish airstrikes on 1 September 2018 as part of the Kurdish–Turkish conflict.

== Notable people ==
- Margaret George Shello (1942–1969), Assyrian militant.

== Bibliography ==
- Donabed, Sargon George (2010). Iraq and the Assyrian Unimagining: Illuminating Scaled Suffering and a Hierarchy of Genocide from Simele to Anfal (PDF).
- Donabed, Sargon George (2015). Reforging a Forgotten History: Iraq and the Assyrians in the Twentieth Century. Edinburgh University Press.
- Eshoo, Majed (2004). The Fate Of Assyrian Villages Annexed To Today's Dohuk Governorate In Iraq And The Conditions In These Villages Following The Establishment Of The Iraqi State In 1921 (PDF). Translated by Mary Challita.
- Khan, Geoffrey (2008). The Neo-Aramaic Dialect of Barwar. Brill.
- Wilmshurst, David (2000). The Ecclesiastical Organisation of the Church of the East, 1318–1913 (PDF). Peeters Publishers.
