= Işıklı, Çukurca =

Village in Hakkari Province, Turkey

Işıklı
- Village
- Location within Turkey
- Coordinates: 37.256°N 43.703°E
- Country: Turkey
- Province: Hakkâri
- District: Çukurca
- Population (1997): 271
- Time zone: UTC+3 (TRT)

Işıklı (Kurdish: Ziyaniş; Syriac: Azyānīsh) is a village in the Çukurca District in Hakkâri Province in Turkey. The village has been depopulated since the 1990s.

The hamlet of Güngörmez (Nizar) is attached to the village.

== History ==
It was historically considered a part of the Pinyānīsh district of the Hakkari region.

The village was populated by Kurds of the Pinyanişî tribe until the Turkish army evacuated the village in the 1990s during the Kurdish–Turkish conflict. The village was subsequently declared a military zone and the locals were forbidden to return.

== Population ==
Population history from 1965 until 1997.

Population
Year	Pop.	±%
1965	466	—
1985	733	+57.3%
1997	271	−63.0%
