= Çukurca =

Town in Hakkâri Province, Turkey

- Municipality
- Logo

- Location in Turkey
- Coordinates: 37°14′49″N 43°36′42″E
- Country: Turkey
- Province: Hakkâri
- District: Çukurca

Government
  - Mayor: Ensar Dündar (AKP)
- Population (2023): 10,252
- Time zone: UTC+3 (TRT)
- Website: www.cukurca.bel.tr

Çukurca (Kurdish: Çel, lit. 'ditch, pit, hole, well', Syriac: ܛܝܵܪܹܐ, romanized: Ṭyārē, Lishanid Noshan: גיאלא) is a municipality (belde) and seat of Çukurca District in Hakkâri Province of Turkey. The city is populated by Kurds of the Ertoşî and Pinyanişî tribes and had a population of 10,252in 2023. The mayor is Ensar Dündar from Justice and Development Party since 2019.

== Neighborhoods ==
Çukurca is divided into the three neighborhoods of Cumhuriyet, Emirşaban and Yeşilçeşme.

== Jews ==
Kurdish-speaking Jews lived here historically; most fled during Sayfo, and the last remaining members of the community emigrated to Israel in 1951.

== Population ==
Population history from 2007 to 2023:

Population
Year	Pop.	±%
2007	7,033	—
2012	8,247	+17.3%
2017	8,547	+3.6%
2022	7,485	−12.4%
2023	10,252	+37.0%

== Climate ==
Çukurca has a hot-summer subtype (Köppen: Dsa) of the humid continental climate.

Climate data for Çukurca
Month	Jan	Feb	Mar	Apr	May	Jun	Jul	Aug	Sep	Oct	Nov	Dec	Year
Mean daily maximum °C (°F)	4.1 (39.4)	5.7 (42.3)	10.2 (50.4)	16.0 (60.8)	23.3 (73.9)	29.9 (85.8)	34.5 (94.1)	34.4 (93.9)	30.4 (86.7)	22.6 (72.7)	13.6 (56.5)	6.4 (43.5)	19.3 (66.7)
Daily mean °C (°F)	0.0 (32.0)	1.3 (34.3)	5.5 (41.9)	10.9 (51.6)	17.3 (63.1)	23.0 (73.4)	27.4 (81.3)	27.2 (81.0)	23.1 (73.6)	16.2 (61.2)	8.6 (47.5)	2.5 (36.5)	13.6 (56.5)
Mean daily minimum °C (°F)	−4.0 (24.8)	−3.0 (26.6)	0.9 (33.6)	5.9 (42.6)	11.3 (52.3)	16.2 (61.2)	20.3 (68.5)	20.0 (68.0)	15.8 (60.4)	9.9 (49.8)	3.7 (38.7)	−1.3 (29.7)	8.0 (46.4)
Average precipitation mm (inches)	111 (4.4)	146 (5.7)	142 (5.6)	131 (5.2)	59 (2.3)	2 (0.1)	1 (0.0)	1 (0.0)	3 (0.1)	41 (1.6)	98 (3.9)	108 (4.3)	843 (33.2)
Source: Climate-Data.org

== Notable people ==
- Vezir Coşkun Parlak (born 1989) electronic engineer and politician
