= Gündeş, Çukurca =

Village in Hakkari Province, Turkey

Gündeş
- Village
- Location within Turkey
- Coordinates: 37.313°N 43.471°E
- Country: Turkey
- Province: Hakkâri
- District: Çukurca
- Population (2023): 2,376
- Time zone: UTC+3 (TRT)

Gündeş (Kurdish: Gêman) is a village in the Çukurca District in Hakkâri Province in Turkey. The village is populated by Kurds of the Kaşuran tribe and had a population of 2,376 in 2023.

The six hamlets of Boylu (Geluk), Köprülü (Çem), Güzeldere (Minyaniş), Ormanlı (Zavîte), Çiçekli (Kanîketkî) and Çimenli (Mêrgan) are attached to Cevizli. Boylu and Çiçekli are unpopulated.

== Ormanlı ==
Ormanlı (Classical Syriac: ܙܘܝܬܐ, romanized: Zāwīṯā) is a hamlet which historically was an Assyrian village and part of the lower Tyari district. Between 1850 and 1877, the village had ninety Assyrian families who were members of Syriac Christianity including one priest in 1850 and 12 priests in 1877. There was moreover a church in the village during this period. The village was destroyed during Sayfo. The hamlet is populated by Kurds of Alan and Êzdînan tribes today and had a population of 438 in 2022.

== Population ==
Population history of the village from 2007 to 2023:

Population
Year	Pop.	±%
2007	2,003	—
2012	2,162	+7.9%
2017	2,363	+9.3%
2022	2,324	−1.7%
2023	2,376	+2.2%
