= Üzümlü, Çukurca =

Village in Hakkari Province, Turkey

Üzümlü
- Village
- Location within Turkey
- Coordinates: 37.253°N 43.526°E
- Country: Turkey
- Province: Hakkâri
- District: Çukurca
- Population (2023): 1,816
- Time zone: UTC+3 (TRT)

Üzümlü (Kurdish: Deştan) is a village in the Çukurca District in Hakkâri Province in Turkey. The village is populated by Kurds of the Pinyanişî tribe and had a population of 1,816 in 2023.

The unpopulated hamlet of Balkaya (Biyereş) is attached to Üzümlü. It is close to a border crossing (the Üzümlü customs gate) that connects Turkey and Iraq, giving it local importance for cross-border movement and trade. It is located in a mountainous area at an elevation of over 1,500 meters, which affects its climate and economy.

== Population ==
Population history of the village from 2007 to 2023:

Population
Year	Pop.	±%
2007	587	—
2012	941	+60.3%
2017	1,860	+97.7%
2022	1,391	−25.2%
2023	1,816	+30.6%
