= Kayalık, Çukurca =

Village in Hakkari Province, Turkey

Kayalık
- Village
- Location within Turkey
- Coordinates: 37.343°N 43.679°E
- Country: Turkey
- Province: Hakkâri
- District: Çukurca
- Population (2023): 92
- Time zone: UTC+3 (TRT)

Kayalık (Kurdish: Zavîte) is a village in the Çukurca District in Hakkâri Province in Turkey. The village is populated by Kurds of the Pinyanişî tribe and had a population of 92 in 2023. The hamlets of Çeltik (Tuxup), Güzeldere (Taxêkevirî), Kaynak (Bêrîç) and Meşeli (Hêşet) are attached to Kayalık.

The village was depopulated in the 1990s during the Kurdish–Turkish conflict.

== Population ==
Population history of the village from 2007 to 2023:

Population
Year	Pop.	±%
2007	233	—
2012	38	−83.7%
2017	88	+131.6%
2022	80	−9.1%
2023	92	+15.0%
