= Zoltán Felvinczi Takács =

Hungarian art historian (1880–1964)

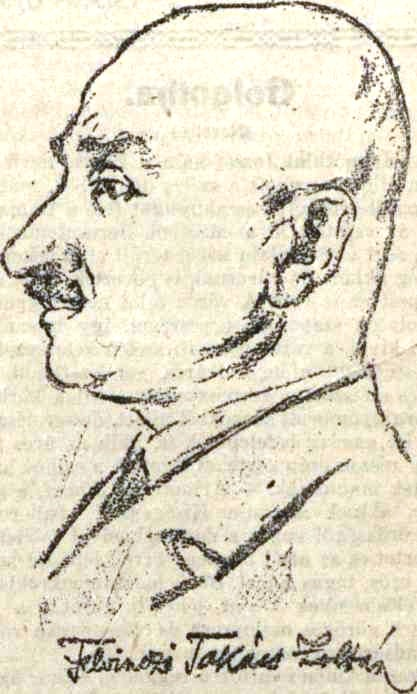
- Zoltán Felvinczi Takács 1922
- Born: April 7, 1880; Nagysomkút
- Died: December 4, 1964 (aged 84); Budapest
- Occupations: art historian and professor

Zoltán Felvinczi Takács (April 7, 1880 – April 12, 1964) was a Hungarian art historian. His research interests include the paintings of Albrecht Dürer, Oriental art, and art criticism.

== Career ==
Felvinczi Takács was born in Nagysomkút, Austria-Hungary (present-day Șomcuta Mare, Romania). He completed his secondary school career in Nagybánya and Kolozsvár (present-day Baia Mare and Cluj-Napoca in Romania, respectively), and his university studies in Budapest. In addition to studying law, he also studied painting at the Budapest School of Design, as a student of Simon Hollósy in Munich, and in the Nagybánya artists' colony and Berlin. His early work was focused on the art of Albrecht Dürer, and he published a monograph on the artist in 1909.

He assisted with the creation of the Ferenc Hopp Museum of Asiatic Arts in 1919 after the art collector Ferenc Hopp died, leaving his collection of some 4000 pieces of Oriental art to the state. Felvinczi Takács served as the first director of the museum.

In 1920 he, along with Pál Teleki, founded the Kőrösi Csoma Society, a Hungarian Orientalist society. His increased interest in East Asia led him to travel to China in the 1930s, publishing a guidebook reporting on his experiences.

In 1940, Felvinczi Takács was appointed to the Franz Joseph University in Kolozsvár, where he is credited with laying the foundations of the school of art history. While teaching there, he organized a number of exhibitions on Transylvanian and Asian art. He left in 1947 and was then employed at the University of Szeged, where he taught until 1950.

== Selected publications ==
- Dürer (in Hungarian). Budapest: Lampel R. (Wodianer F.). 1909. OCLC 32507308.
- A Kelet művészete [Oriental art] (in Hungarian). Budapest: Dante. 1943. OCLC 32713201.
- Some premises of Islamic ornamental system. Budapest. 1944. OCLC 60505414.

== Academic service ==
- Founding member, Kőrösi Csoma Society, 1920
- Board member, Magyar Régészeti és Művészettörténeti Társaság (1922–1935)
- Director, Ferenc Hopp Museum of Asiatic Arts
- Founding member and executive vice-president, Hungarian Oriental Society (1932–1946)
- Founding member and vice-president, Magyar Nippon Társaság (1932–1944)
