= Louis Sabunji =

Ottoman Catholic journalist and activist (1838–1931)

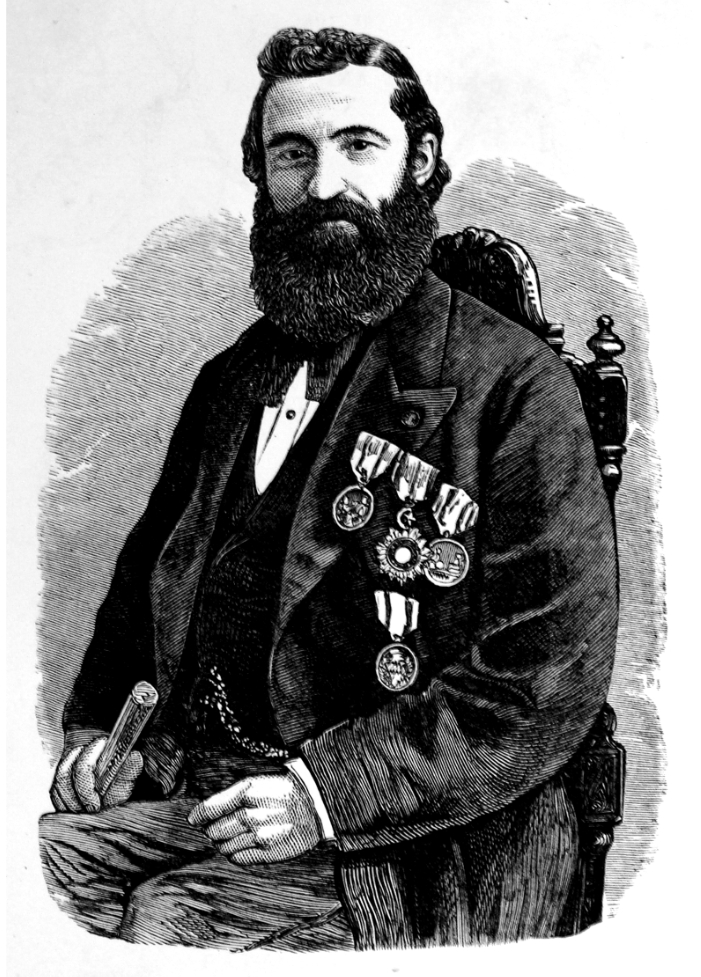
- In 1877
- Born: John Louis Sabunji; 1838; Diyarbakır, Ottoman Empire
- Died: 1931 (aged 92–93); Los Angeles, United States
- Occupations: Catholic priest Journalist
- Years active: 1860s–1920s
- Known for: founder of Al Nahla

John Louis Sabunji (7 November 1838 – 24 April1931) was a Syriac Catholic priest and political figure who founded and edited various publications, most significantly Al Nahla (Arabic: The Bee) one of the first newspapers in Arabic based in London. Al Nahla was a monthly newspaper that contained anti-Ottoman propaganda directed at Muslims and inciting them to renounce the authority of the Ottoman ruler Abdulhamid II as a religious Caliph. Sabunji worked with American missionaries in Beirut and later converted to Islam. He also worked with the Anglican missionary George Percy Badger with whom he compiled an Arabic-English dictionary. He was also one of the earliest photographers in Beirut.

== Early life and education ==
Sabunji was born in Derik, 60 km south of Diyarbakır in 1838. He was initially named as Yūḥannā / John and given the name Louis when he was fifteen. His family were Syriac Catholic. His father Yaqub or Jacob was an engineer and architect who worked in the Ottoman Empire. Jacob died at 61 in Diyarbakır and his mother died in 1899. He had at least three brothers and a sister. These included Jurji (George, 1840-1910) who became a famous photographer. Iskandar Malikī (Alexander Malcolm, 1849-1921) who became a famous jewel dealer in India and Daoud.

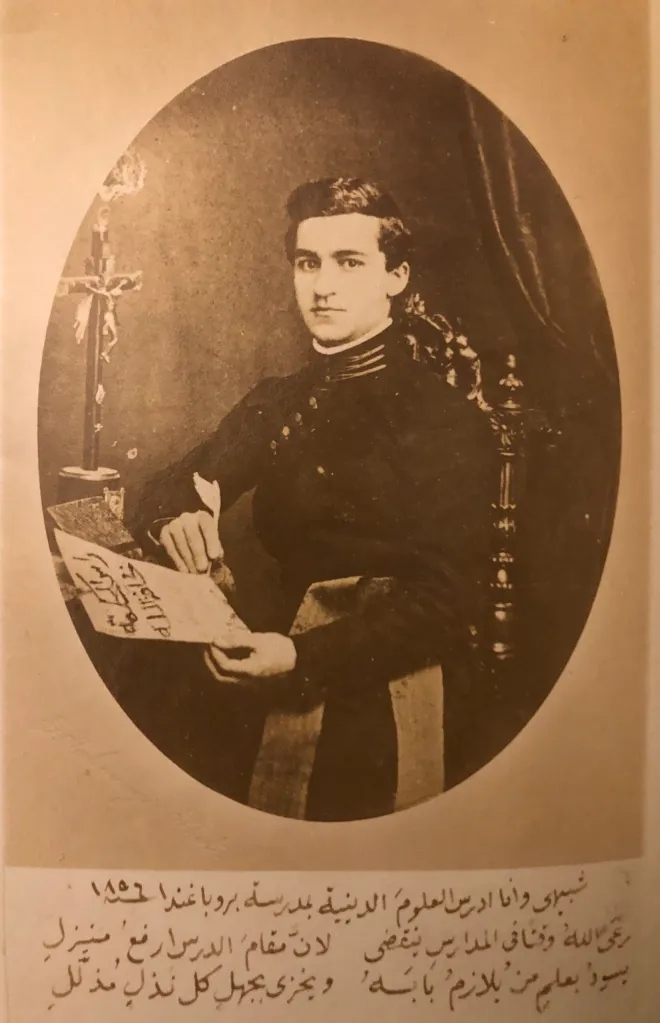
As a student in Rome, 1854

Sabunji went to the Sharfa monastery in Mount Lebanon in 1850 at the age of eleven. He wrote that the school was very poor and that the head Yūsuf Ḥāyik was uneducated and incompetent. He then left this and went to Aleppo in 1852. At around thirteen or fourteen he joined bishop Anṭūn al-Samḥīrī (1801-1864) and returned to Sharfa in 1853. At the age of fifteen he was made a subdeacon (rutbat al-abūdiyākun) and named as Louis. Then he joined the new Patriarch al-Samḥīrī to Rome. He then attended the College of Pontifical Propaganda in Rome between 1855 and 1861 and received a doctorate in theology. There he also learned photography which he taught his brother George.

== Beirut ==
Sabunji left Rome on 21 June 1863 and travelled through Cairo, Jerusalem, Beirut, Aleppo, Diyarbakır, and finally Mardin. At Mardin al-Samḥīrī ordained him as priest. He returned to Diyarbakır in November 1863 and joined as a priest. Here he clashed with the bishop Philip ʿArkūs (1827-1873) who considered Sabunji's conduct including walking in gardens as unbefitting a priest. The relations became worse with the death of al-Samḥīrī in June 1864 and ʿArkūs rising to the position of Patriarch. Sabunji left to Aleppo and met George Shalḥa (1818-1891) who appointed him to Beirut in 1865. He was among the first Turkish and Latin instructors of the Syrian Protestant College established in 1866 by American missionaries. He established and headed a school named Al Madrasa Al Siriyaniyya (Arabic: the Syriac School) in 1864. Sabunji was also chosen as tutor to the children of Franco Pasha (1814-1873). He launched a weekly journal entitled Al Nahla in 1870. In August 1871 Sabunji suspended his journalistic activity in Beirut due to his clash with Butrus Al Bustani, a Christian journalist, and traveled various countries until his return to Beirut in 1864. Sabunji continued to clash with the Patriarch ʿArkūs who prohibited him from learning to play the piano among others. Sabunji wrote a letter to Rome complaining about ʿArkūs and his stance against those who used Latin rather than Syriac. as Sabunji permanently left Beirut due to his anti-Ottoman political stance.

== London ==
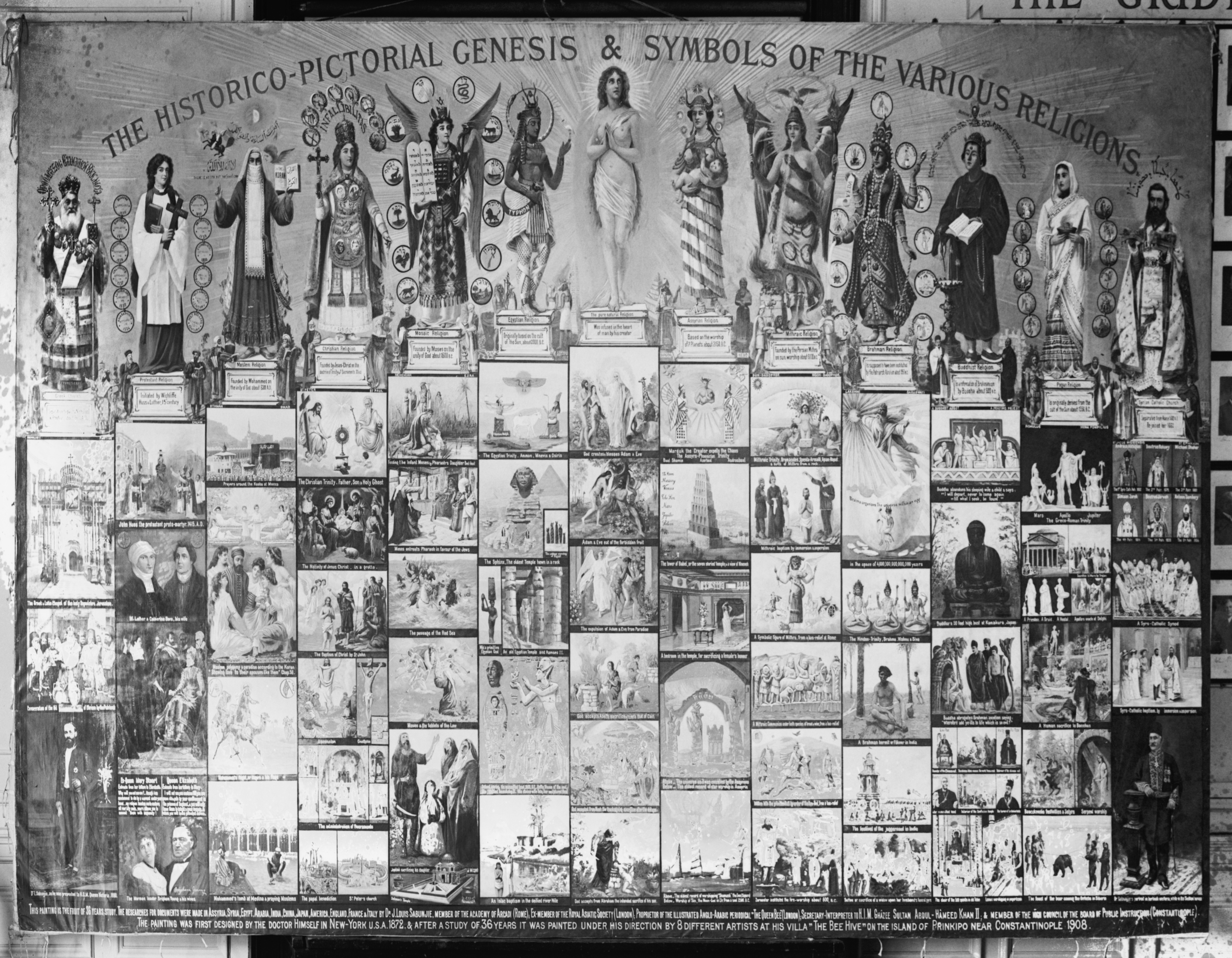
Sabunji's 1908 "Historico-Pictorial Genesis & Symbols of the Various Religions", no physical copy exists anymore

Sabunji went to Liverpool in 1875 and then visited the United States for a few months. He returned first to Manchester and then to London. In London Sabunji worked as the political editor of a publication entitled Mirat Al Ahwal which was launched by Rizk Allah Hassun on 19 October 1876. Sabunji continued to publish Al Nahla in London from 1877 and it continued until 1880. It was initially pro-British but gradually became critical of British policy. He founded another weekly in London entitled Al Khalifa. Sabunji became the professor of the Arabic language at the Imperial Institute in London in the late 1880s. He also worked with Wilfrid Scawen Blunt (1840-1922) who wrote The Future of Islam in 1882. Through Blunt he met the Egyptian James Sanua (1839-1912) and the Afghan Jamāl al-Dīn al-Afghān in Paris and they shared views against British colonialism in Egypt.

Sabunji was involved in British relations with the Ottoman empire and was employed by the Ottomans to act as a monitor of the European press between 1891 and 1909. He was also hired to teach the son of Sultan ʿAbd al-Ḥamīd II, Burhān al-Dīn (1885-1949). He lived in Istanbul for some time from 1890. From 1904 he lived on the island of Büyükada, the ‘Bee Hive Hotel’. Upon the deposition of Abd al-Ḥamīd II in 1909, Sabunji lost his position and protection. He wrote The Free Ottoman in 1909. After publishing a eulogy on the Sultan in 1897 he now held an opposite view of him as having ruled as a despot.

Sabunji wrote several pamphlets and unpublished manuscripts, including Diwan and his diary Yıldız Sarayında bir Papaz (Turkish: A Priest in Yıldız Palace).

== Beirut, Egypt and the United States ==
Sabunji moved back to Beirut in 1909 and then to Egypt in 1914. He stayed there until 1917 and in 1918 during the World War years. He arrived in Seattle on 24 October 1918 on a Japanese ship Arabia Maru and he was recorded as being Assyrian. In 1909 he held an Italian citizenship.

He published an Arabic book and a pamphlet about a large painting of the origins of various religions. He lived in poverty in a hotel in Los Angeles and survived on charity. He was found dead on 24 April 1931 and two men were arrested on suspicions that they had murdered him. An autopsy identified the cause of death as natural, possibly caused by a fall in the bathtub.
