= Al Nahla =

Arabic Catholic magazine (1870–1880)

- Editor: Louis Sabunji
- Categories: Political magazine; Catholic magazine
- Frequency: Weekly
- Founder: Louis Sabunji
- Founded: 1870
- First issue: 11 May 1870
- Final issue: 1 May 1880
- Country: Ottoman Syria; United Kingdom
- Based in: Beirut; London
- Language: Arabic; English

Al Nahla (Arabic: The Bee) was a weekly political magazine which existed between 1870 and 1880 with one-year interruption. It was first published in Beirut and then in London. The magazine was one of the early examples of private journalism in Lebanon. It was also one of the earliest Arabic publications in London.

== History and profile ==
Al Nahla was launched by Louis Sabunji as a weekly publication in Beirut in 1870 when he was working as a Catholic priest in the city. The first issue appeared on 11 May 1870. The cover page declared that the magazine contained articles about science, industry, history, language, local affairs, foreign affairs, humour and narrations. Of them the scientific, historical and humour sections were edited by Sabunji. Al Nahla employed illustrations, including those drawn by its editor Louis Sabunji. The magazine enjoyed the financial support of various sponsors, including Khedive Ismail and Sultan of Zanzibar. Al Nahla had clashes with another Beirut magazine Al Jinan and its editor Butrus Al Bustani in early 1871 when Sabunji attacked Al Bustani. Due to these conflicts and its anti-Hamidian content, Al Nahla was subject to bans by the Ottoman governor of Syria. In fact, these bans were the first censorship by the Ottoman authorities in the region. From August 1871 the magazine was published by Sabunji's business partner Joseph Shalfun.

In 1876 Sabunji had to leave Beirut as a result of his increased anti-Ottoman views published in Al Nahla and settled in London. Next year he began to publish Al Nahla in London as a bilingual publication covering Arabic and English content. George Percy Badger was instrumental in the restart of the magazine. It continued its attacks over the Ottoman Sultan in London denouncing him as "an usurper of the title of ... Caliph." However, in London Al Nahla had another goal: to support those who were planning to open the East Africa markets for European trade. The magazine was published regularly in London until 1 May 1880. However, Sabunji revived it in 1883 and 1884 without any regular scheme.

A complete collection of Al Nahla's issues is archived by the British Museum, London.
