= Vezir Coşkun Parlak =

Turkish electronic engineer and politician

Vezir Coşkun Parlak is an electronic engineer and politician. Since June 2023 he is a member of the Grand National Assembly of Turkey representing Hakkari for the Peoples' Equality and Democracy Party (DEM Party).

== Early life and education ==
Vezir Coşkun Parlak was born in 1989 in Çukurca in Hakkari province. In 1997, he and his family moved to Ankara where he completed primary and secondary education. Following he studied electronic engineering and graduated from the Yüzüncü Yıl University in Van.

== Political career ==
Since 2008, he is active in politics, and was involved in the HDK and also the Democratic Regions Party (DBP) or the Peoples Democratic Party (HDP). In 2020, when he was the co-chair of the HDP branch in Ankara, he was detained for a short while after he protested against the dismissal of the mayors of the HDP. In the parliamentary election of May 2023, he was elected into the Grand National Assembly of Turkey representing Hakkari for the YSP. The day he was elected to the Grand National Assembly of Turkey, a prosecutor initiated a criminal investigation against him for terror related charges due to his support of prisoners in a prison in Rize.
