= Çukurca District =

District in Hakkâri Province, Turkey

Coordinates: 37°18′N 43°33′E

- District
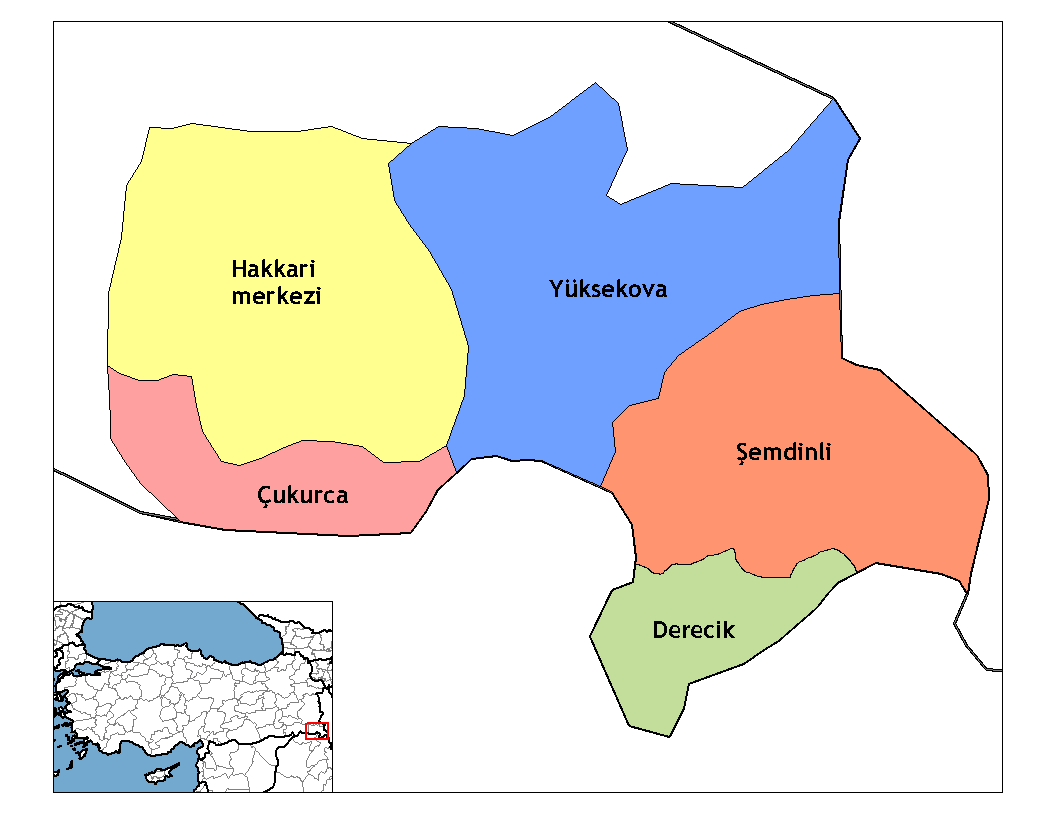
- Map showing Çukurca District in Hakkâri Province
- Country: Turkey
- Province: Hakkâri
- Seat: Çukurca

Government
  - Kaymakam: Hasan Kurt
- Area: 725 km^{2} (280 sq mi)
- Population (2023): 17,734
  - Density: 24.5/km^{2} (63.4/sq mi)
- Time zone: UTC+3 (TRT)
- Website: www.cukurca.gov.tr

Çukurca District is a district in the Hakkâri Province of Turkey. The district had a population of 17,734 in 2023 with the town of Çukurca as its seat. Its area is 725 km^{2}. Çukurca shares a border with Iraqi Kurdistan to the south. The current district governor (kaymakam) is Hasan Kurt.

The district has more unpopulated settlements than populated ones.

The district was established in 1953.

== Settlements ==
There is one municipality in Çukurca District:

- Çukurca (Çel)

The district has sixteen villages of which eight are unpopulated:

1. Akkaya (Serispî)
2. Cevizli (Gûzereş)
3. Çağlayan (Erbûş)
4. Çayırlı (Erij)
5. Çığlı (Aşut)
6. Çınarlı (Şîwarezan)
7. Dede (Bêtrut)
8. Gündeş (Gêman)
9. Işıklı (Ziyaniş)
10. Kavaklı (Şivîşk)
11. Kavuşak (Bilêcan)
12. Kayalık (Zavitê)
13. Kazan (Tîyar)
14. Kurudere (Marufan)
15. Narlı (Biyadir)
16. Üzümlü (Deştan)

There are moreover thirty-four hamlets in the district.

== Population ==
Population history from 2007 to 2023:

Population
Year	Pop.	±%
2007	12,352	—
2012	15,294	+23.8%
2017	16,661	+8.9%
2022	14,333	−14.0%
2023	17,734	+23.7%
