= Timothaus Shallita =

Timothaus Mar Shallita Youwala (born 1936) is Archbishop of the Ancient Holy Apostolic Catholic Church of the East for Germany and all Europe. He currently resides in Mainz-Kastel, Germany.

== Bibliography ==
Archbishop Timothaus Mar Shallita Youwala was born July 14, 1936, in Barwari Bala, Iraq, in the village of Galja, where the church of Mar Qayoma is situated. Many bishops of the Mar Youalla family, which has served the Church of the East for over four hundred years, have emerged from there. He was consecrated a Deacon on September 3, 1954, in the village of Harir, Iraq, by Metropolitan Mar Yosip Khnanisho, the uncle of Patriarch Shimun XXI Eshai. After the death of Bishop Mar Yalda Yawallaha in 1950, two nephews were to qualify for succession; Andreos and Shallita. After a vacancy of six years, Metropolitan Mar Yosip Khanisho and Patriarchal representative in Iraq decided to consecrate Andreos as bishop on July 14, 1957. Mar Andreos served as bishop until his death in June 1973.

Shallita and his supporters did not accept this decision as Andreos was younger than Shallita. In protest of the decision, Shallita and his supporters joined the Syriac Orthodox Church. Consequently, Timothaus Mar Shallita was consecrated Archbishop in the church St. Petrus and Paulus in Beirut, Lebanon, by Patriarch Ignatius Ya`qub III on October 23, 1958. Participants to the ceremony were Archbishop Mar Paulus from Iraq, Archbishop Bahnnan from Lebanon, Bishop Paulus from Jerusalem and the current Patriarch of the Syriac Orthodox Church Zakka I Iwas, a former secretary and monk. Over 2,000 guests attended the consecration, Camille Chamoun, the president of Lebanon, being one of them. Timotheus Mar Shallita was welcomed into communion, but did not join the Holy Synod of the church.

Timothaus Mar Shallita returned from Lebanon to Iraq in 1958. At that time, King Faisal II of Iraq had been murdered by General Abd al-Karim Qasim and the monarchy was abolished. He met with General Qasim, who had taken over power and had also murdered the Prime Minister Nuri al-Said, to demand freedom of speech and press. After this, the archbishop gave a speech in Aramaic and Arabic which was broadcast on the radio and television in Baghdad.

From Baghdad he returned to Barwari-Bala. Three years later, the conflict between the Kurds and the Iraqi government began, which caused Mar Shallita to temporarily leave to Mosul in 1963, later relocating to the Syriac Orthodox Patriarchate in Damascus. There he met Patriarch Ignatius Ya`qub III, who contacted the World Council of Churches in Geneva on his behalf. Almost immediately, representatives of the Evangelical Church in Germany invited the Archbishop to come to Darmstadt. There he arrived in 1967 and attended evening school to learn German. Shallita later left the Syrian Orthodox Church In 1969 and entered into communion with the Ancient Church of the East based in Baghdad. However, he did not join the Holy Synod until 1995 and was officially recognised as Metropolitan of Germany and Europe.

This entailed the foundation of new Assyrian communities in Europe. An example is the opening of the St. Georges Church in Joenkopings, Sweden, where Timothaus Mar Shallita attended the opening ceremony. Furthermore, he has consecrated an Archpriest, Khoshaba M. Georges, in London as well as a priest, Jacob Warda, in Denmark, a priest, Oz Sabri, in Marseilles along with eleven deacons all over Europe. On June 8, 1997, the cornerstone ceremony for the church Mar Shallita in Los Angeles took place. President Emanuel Bet Maleck, Sarkis Mikkael Fard, and Mr. David S. Younan were attending the ceremony.

At the time when Archbishop Timothaus Mar Shallita was consecrated, there was only a small division. But a huge split has emerged, caused by the fact that two patriarchs claim to lead one Assyrian church and people. Nevertheless, Timothaus Mar Shallita, who disapproves of the division into two parts, has tried to unite the church and the people by negotiating with both Patriarchs.

Timothaus Mar Shallita speaks in Assyrian Neo-Aramaic, Arabic, Kurdish, German, and English.

== Refugee aid ==
For many years, Assyrian refugees have been writing to Timothaus Mar Shallita in search of help from persecution. In 1978, the archbishop lived in the monastery of Pandely in Greece for a few months where he supported about 8,000 Assyrians who had fled to Greece with the help of the United Nations and the Red Cross. He had talked to the Greek government beforehand in order to arrange possible housing and working places for the refugees, who not only fled from Iraq but also from Iran, Lebanon and Syria.

In 1983, he headed to Italy, again to support the approximately 2,000 refugees and to improve their situation. Thereafter, he went to France to continue his mission. In 1991, he arrived in Turkey to visit the ten Assyrian refugees camps accompanied by staff members of the UNHCR. Silopi was one of these camps. Before his arrival, Timothaus Mar Shallita had received a list with the name of over 40,000 refugees, asking him for help. Afterwards, he talked to the Turkish administration and succeeded in gathering the Assyrian refugees into two camps instead of ten and also insisting on accommodation in houses and no longer in tents, as the harsh East Anatolian winter was not far away.

After that, he started negotiations with the ambassadors of many nations. Months before his travel to Turkey, Timothaus Mar Shallita had already informed them about the situation of the Assyrians by introducing for the first time this ethnic minority, for most countries did not know that the Assyrians still existed. In these negotiations, he succeeded in talks and thousands of Assyrians were admitted as refugees in European countries.

== Literature ==
- Verena Fehlmann-Meyer "Church of the East in Europe and America"
- Writings by Prof. Dr. Donart and Dr. Transchuk
- Summaries by Sabine Juli
