= Alexander Malcolm Jacob =

Indian gem trader (1849–1921)

Alexander Malcolm Jacob (1849–1921) was a diamond and gemstone trader in Simla, India. Probably a Jacobite Christian, his grandfather was an engineer in Constantinople, and his father was the first soap manufacturer in the Ottoman Empire.

== Life ==
Jacob was born near Diyarbakır in the Ottoman Empire, the son of engineer Yakub (or Jacob), he was a brother of Louis Sabunji. His name at birth was Iskandar Meliki bin Ya’qub al-Birri. He however claimed that he was sold as a slave. He claimed that he acquired knowledge of Eastern life, language, art, literature, philosophy, and occultism. After his master's death, Jacob performed the Hajj to Mecca at the age of 21, indicating that he was then a Muslim. Jacob moved to Bombay, India, where he worked as a clerk based on his knowledge of Arabic. Later, he moved to Hyderabad, where he worked for Ami-ul-Kabir, father of Sir Kharsheedjah Bahadur; from there, he moved to Calcutta, where he worked for the jewellers Charles Nephew and Co. He then worked for the Nawab of Rampur and Dholpur for a short time.

Jacob arrived in Simla in the 1870s and founded a business trading precious gemstones and curios. The success of the business allowed him to build and maintain a luxury home, known as Belvedere, in Simla.

The quality of his work resulted in a clientele composed of some of the wealthiest and most influential people in India. The Pioneer found him 'endowed by nature with a wonderful handsome face and form' and there was about him a 'compelling magnetism, a power and mystery which led to his being sought for conversation and advice by Viceroy and princes'. Reports indicate he was celibate, a vegetarian, a teetotaller, and a non-smoker.

== Jacob diamond ==
He is best known for having sold the Jacob Diamond, which is the seventh largest diamond known in the world (previously known as the Victoria Diamond, Imperial Diamond, or Great White Diamond). It was owned by the Nizam of Hyderabad and is currently owned by the Government of India.

The sale of the Jacob Diamond to Mir Mahbub Ali Khan, Nizam of Hyderabad, considered to be one of the richest men in the world, ruined Jacob. He was brought to trial on charges of fraud, and was acquitted only after a long trial at the Calcutta High Court. Jacob was unable to obtain the money due to him, as the court had no jurisdiction over the Indian States. Nor was there any mechanism to get the diamond back. The controversy over the sale cost Jacob his customers. Legal expenses and the default of other princes bankrupted him, who left Simla for Bombay in late 1901. His business was bought by Imre Schwaiger.

Jacob lost his eyesight, and after fourteen years of blindness was cured by the charity of a surgeon friend. His last years were spent in a modest room at Watson's Annexe, a property facing the Bombay Yacht Club. Jacob's last words (to Alice Dracott) were "Give my love to Simla". He died in 1921 and his obituary notice in The Times of 21 January 1921 states Jacob "claimed to be a Turk ... born near Constantinople".

== Popular culture ==
American author F. Marion Crawford wrote the novel Mr. Isaacs about him in 1882. The character Lurgan Sahib of Rudyard Kipling's novel Kim was also based on Jacob.

A biography by John Zubrzycki, The Mysterious Mr Jacob: diamond merchant, magician and spy [ISBN 9780995359437], was published in 2017.
