= Ferenc Hopp Museum of Asiatic Arts =

Museum in Budapest, Hungary

Coordinates: 47.5114°N 19.0730°E

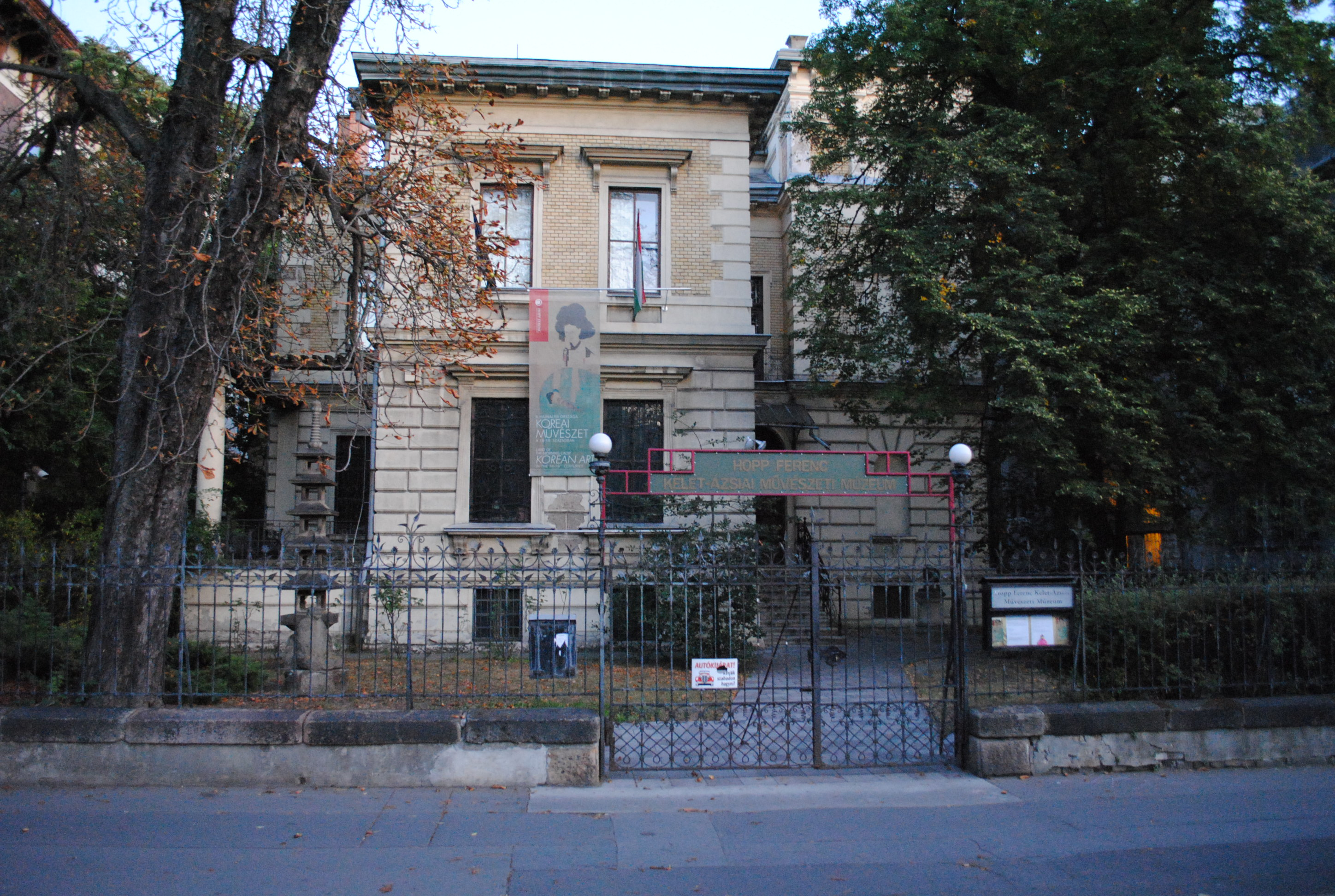
Ferenc Hopp Museum of East Asian Arts

Ferenc Hopp Museum of Asiatic Arts is an art museum in Budapest, Hungary.
