= George Percy Badger =

- Born: 6 April 1815; Chelmsford, England
- Died: 21 February 1888 (aged 72); London
- Education: Church Missionary College, Islington
- Occupation: Anglican missionary
- Spouse: Maria Wilcox

George Percy Badger (6 April 1815 – 21 February 1888) was an English Anglican missionary, and a scholar of oriental studies. He is mainly known for his doctrinal and historical studies about the Church of the East.

== Life ==
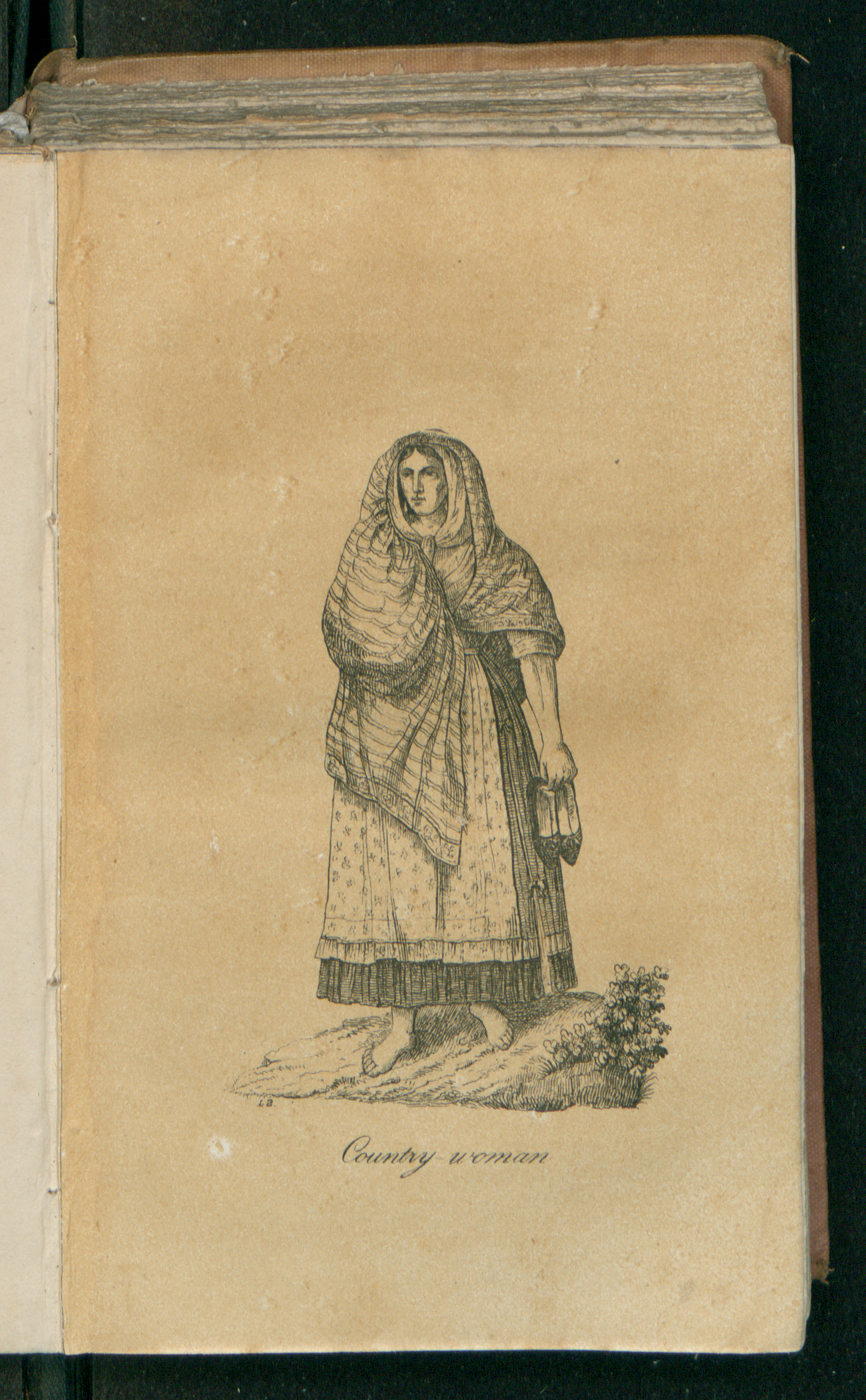
Illustration from Description of Malta and Gozo, 1838

George Percy Badger was born at Chelmsford on 6 April 1815. His father served in the British Army and in 1821 his regiment was transferred in Malta. After his father's death in 1823, George's mother decided to raise her sons in Malta, thus George Badger passed there his youth where he learned the Maltese language and Arabic, which he studied also in Beirut from 1835. On 8 January 1840 Badger married Maria Wilcox in Valletta. He returned to England in 1841, and after some theological studies at the Church Missionary College, Islington, he was ordained Anglican priest in 1842. For his knowledge of the Near East he was appointed by the Archbishop of Canterbury as delegate to the Christians of Church of the East in Mesopotamia and Kurdistan, and in this work he was engaged for three years.

On his return to England in 1845 he was appointed chaplain in Bombay. Thence he was transferred to Aden, where he chiefly resided during the remainder of his term of service. He served as staff chaplain and Arabic interpreter to the force in the Anglo-Persian War. Badger returned to England in 1861, and in the same year again joined Sir James Outram in the latter's visit to Egypt. In 1862 he left the service, and devoted himself henceforth mainly to literature. In 1872 he left England serving as secretary and interpreter of Sir Bartle Frere in a diplomatic travel in Zanzibar.

In recognition of his various services Badger was, in 1873, created D.C.L. by the Archbishop of Canterbury, and Knight of the Crown by King Victor Emmanuel II of Italy in the same year.

Badger helped a Catholic priest from Diyarbakır, Louis Sabunji, to continue his journal, Al Nahla, in London in 1877. Badger died on 21 February 1888, at his residence in London and he was buried in the Kensal Green Cemetery.

== Works ==
Between the years 1839 and 1883 a large number of books were written by George Percy Badger, most of them dealing with Arabic history and literature, and with his travels. Among these may be mentioned Description of Malta and Gozo. (1838), Nestorians and their Rituals (1852), The Travels of Ludovico Varthema in India and the East, A.d. 1503-8 (1873) (both these for the Hakluyt Society), and an English-Arabic Lexicon (1881).

George Percy Badger translated also a text about Ibadism in 1871: History of the Imāms and Seyyids of Omān from A.D. 661-1856 by Hamid Ibn Muhammad Ibn Raziq.
