= Assyrian Timber Transportation relief =

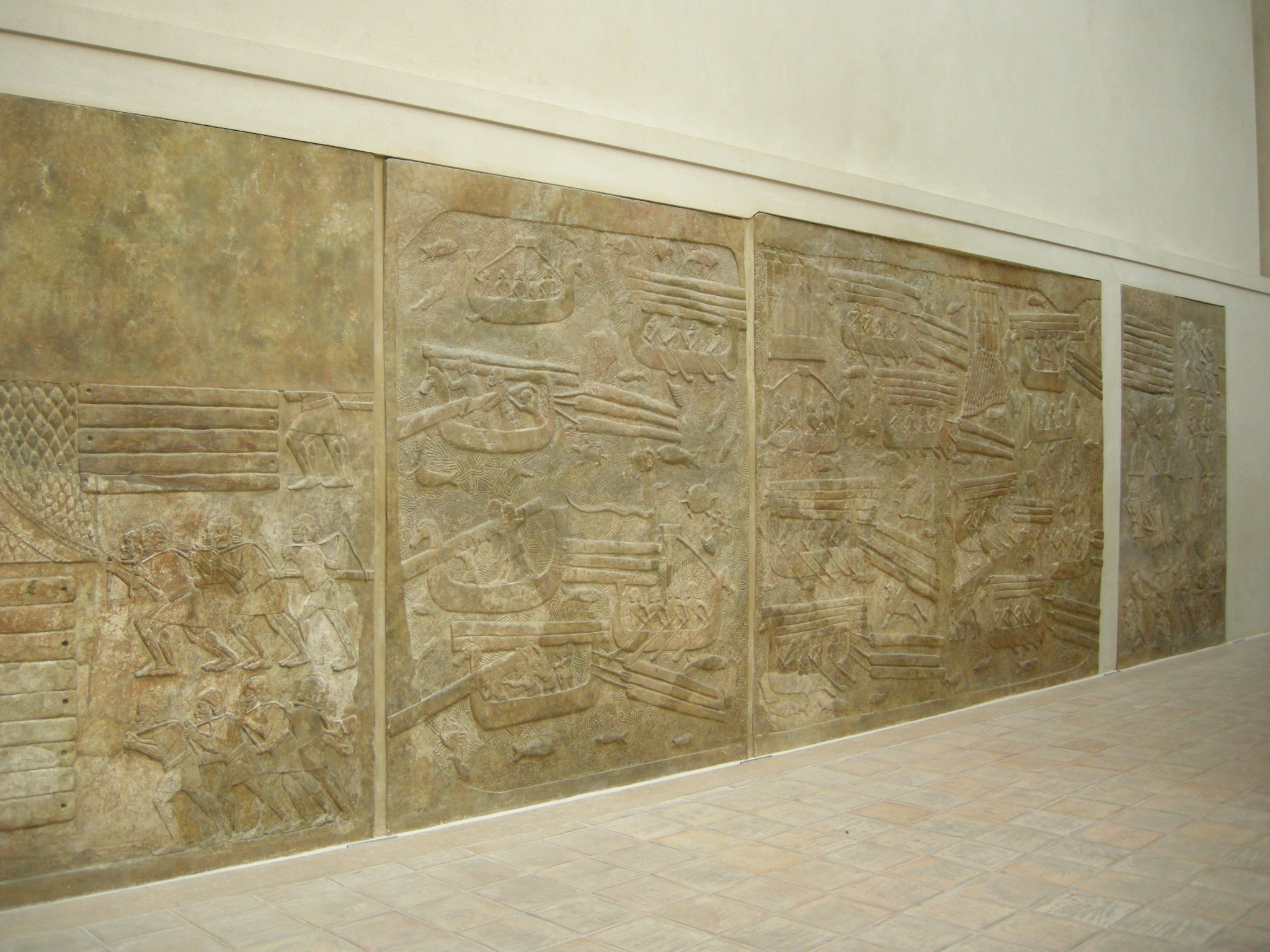
The reliefs at the Louvre

The Assyrian Timber Transportation relief is a well-known wall relief from the palace of Dur-Sharrukin, the Assyrian capital under Sargon II. The reliefs are held in the Louvre, having been excavated in 1844 by Paul-Émile Botta.

== Gallery ==
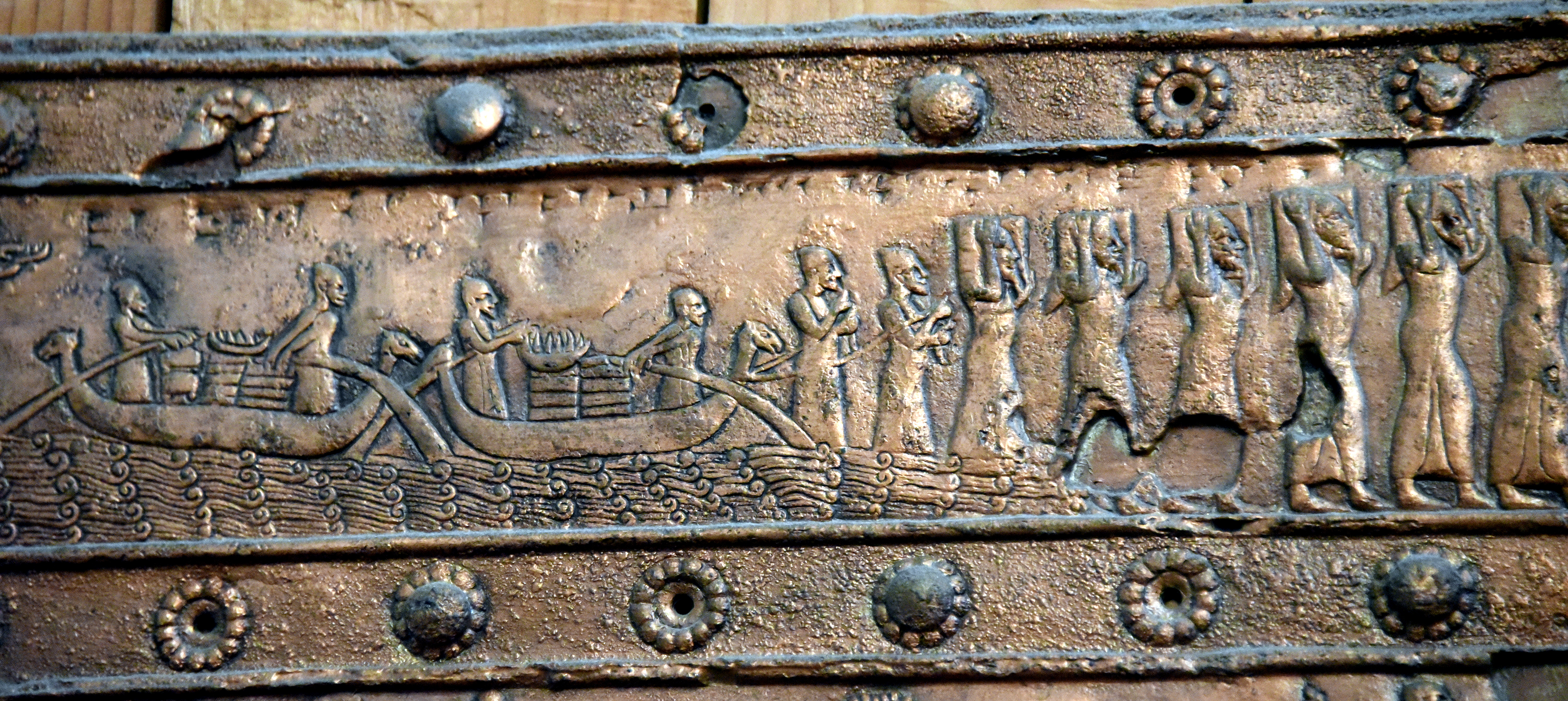
The depictions of horse-headed boats have been compared to those on the Balawat Gates

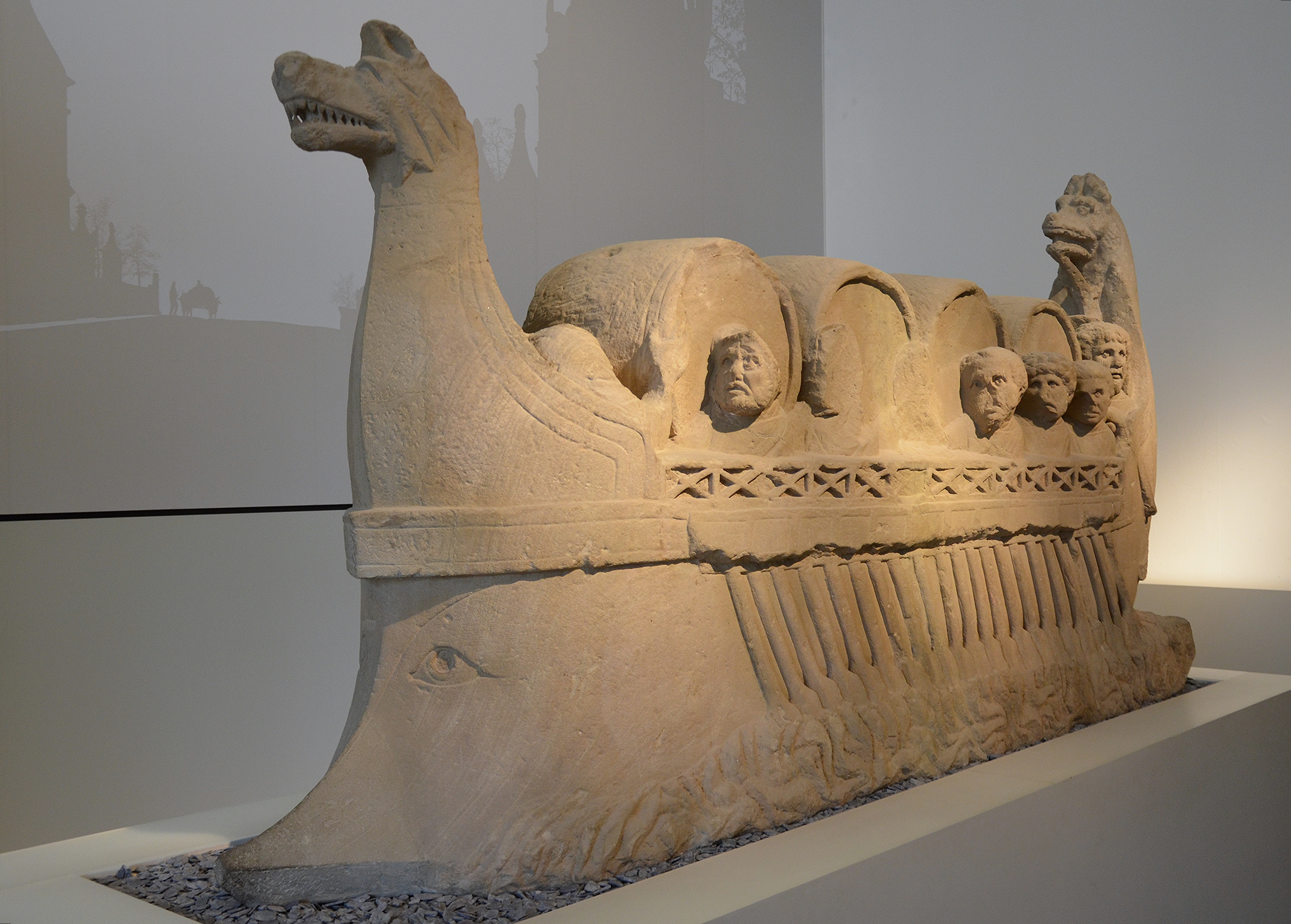
...as well as to the Neumagen ship at the Rheinisches Landesmuseum Trier

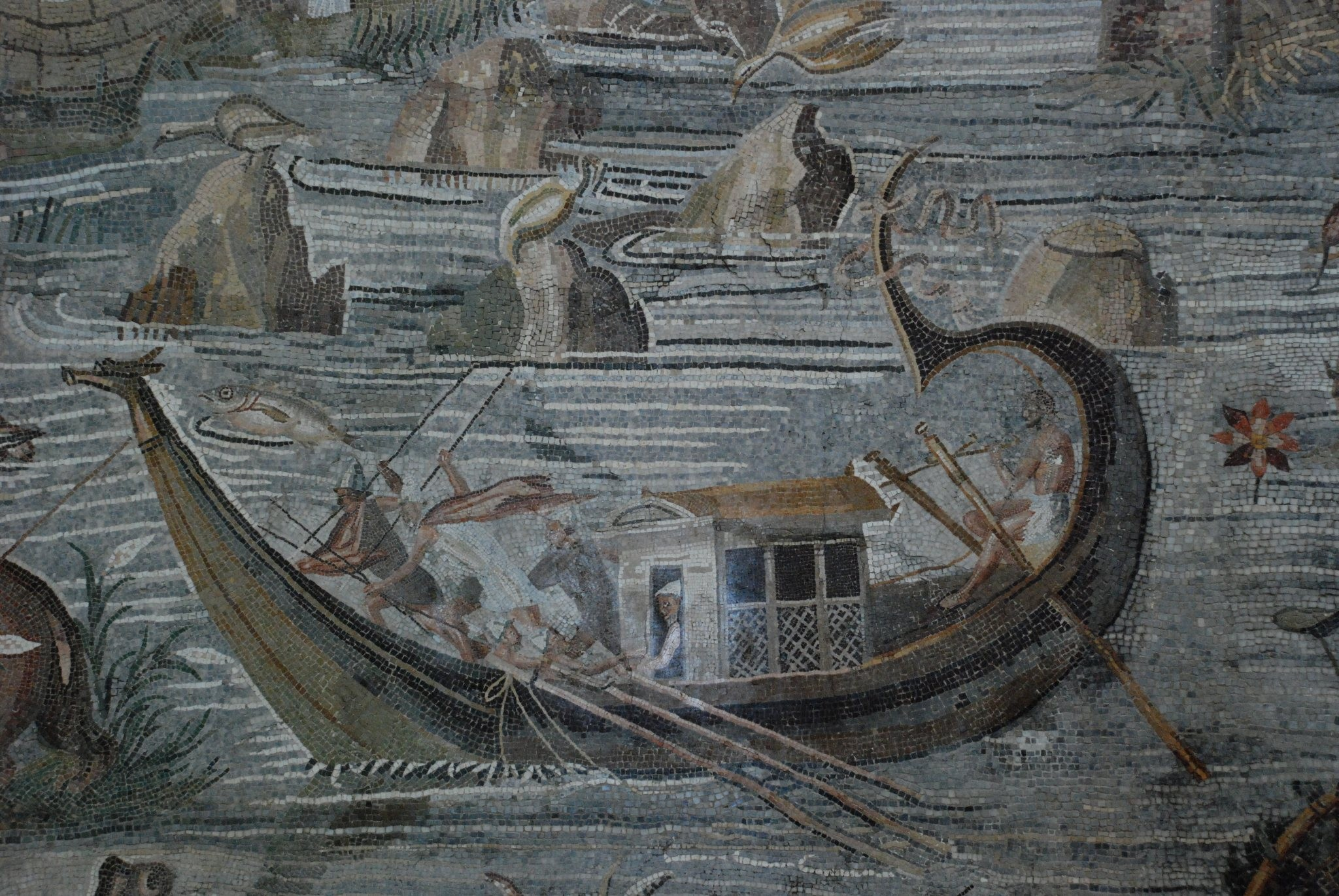
...this ship on the Nile mosaic of Palestrina...

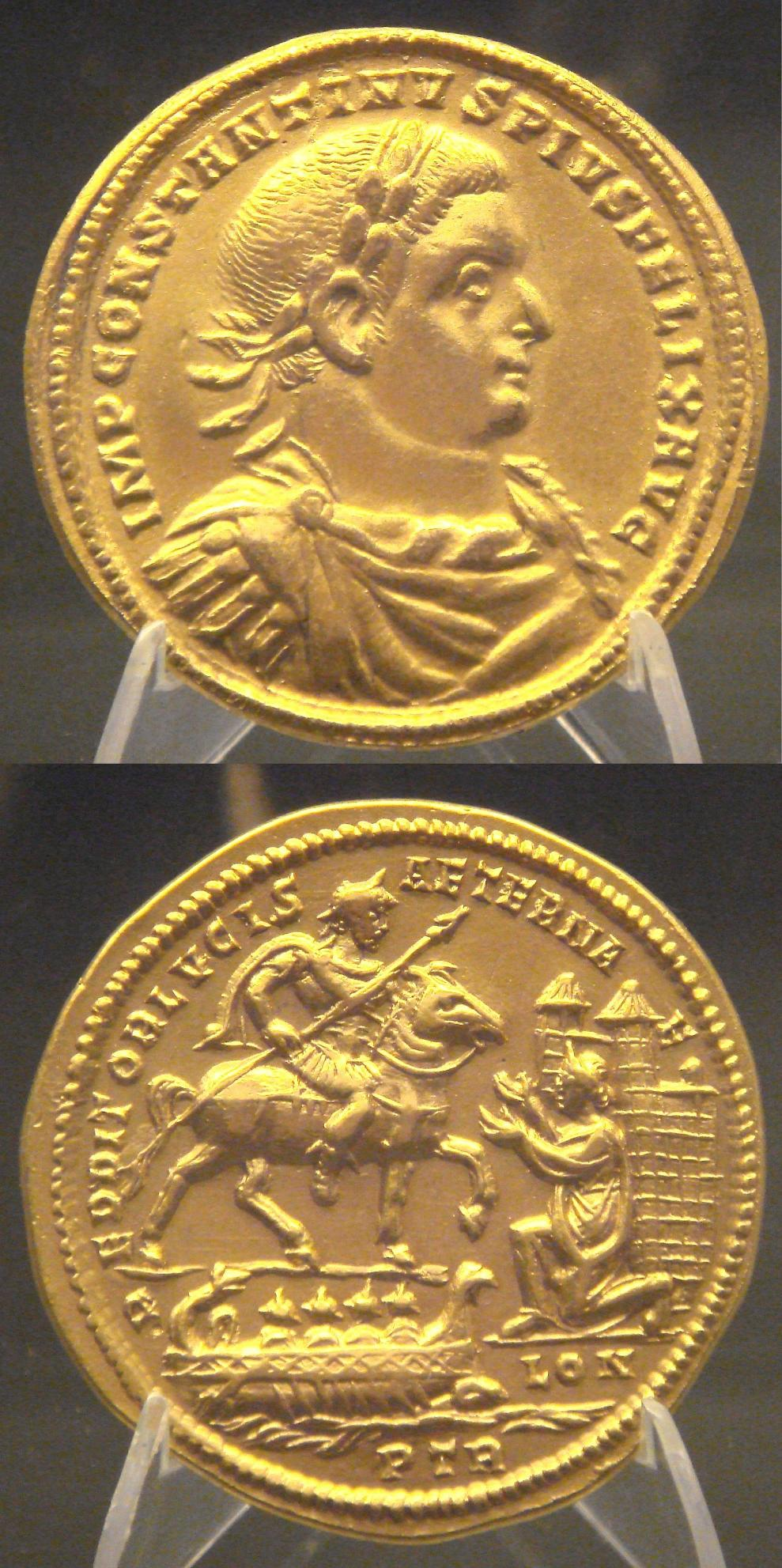
...and the Arras Medallion from the Beaurains Treasure

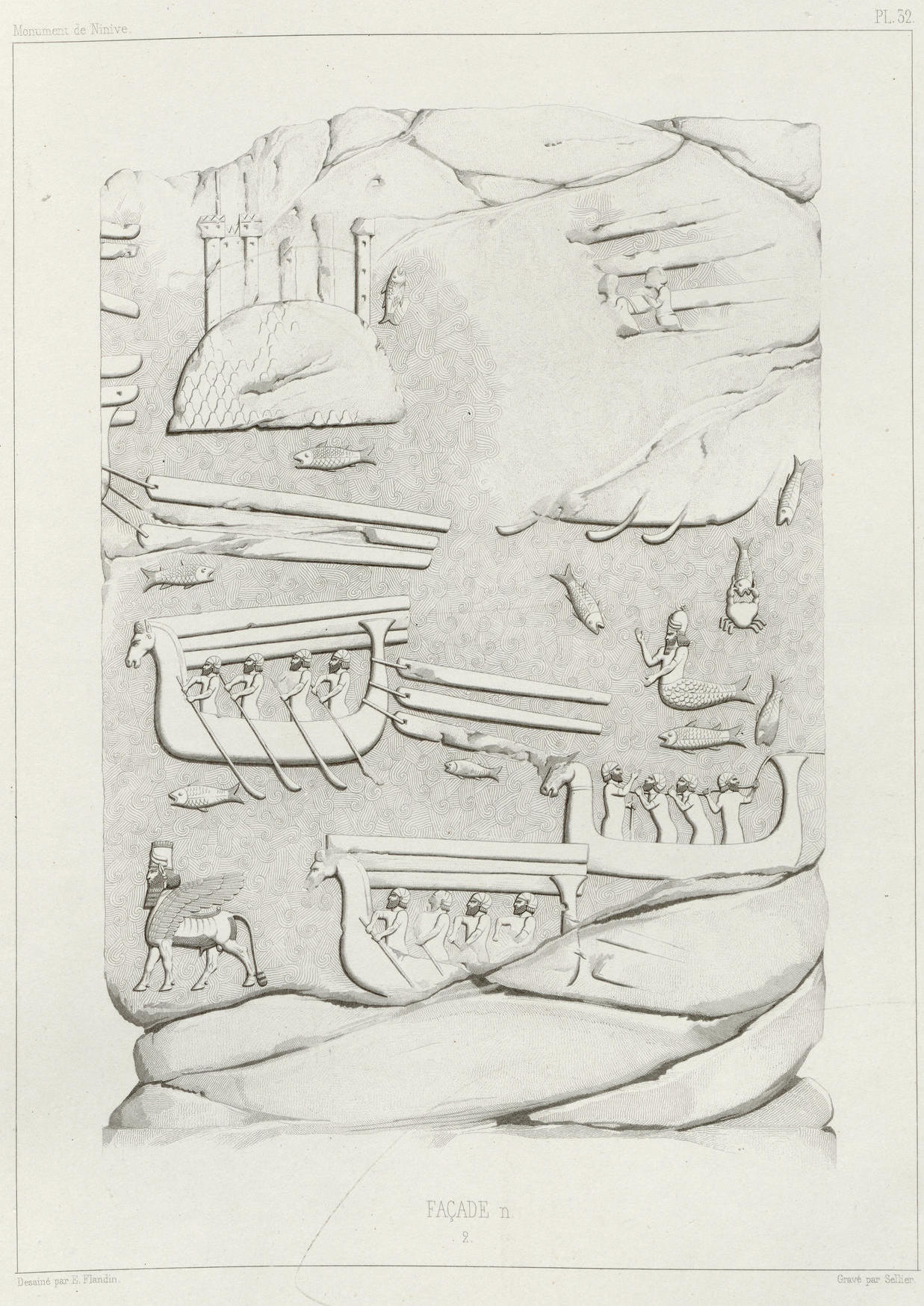
Botta illustration 1849

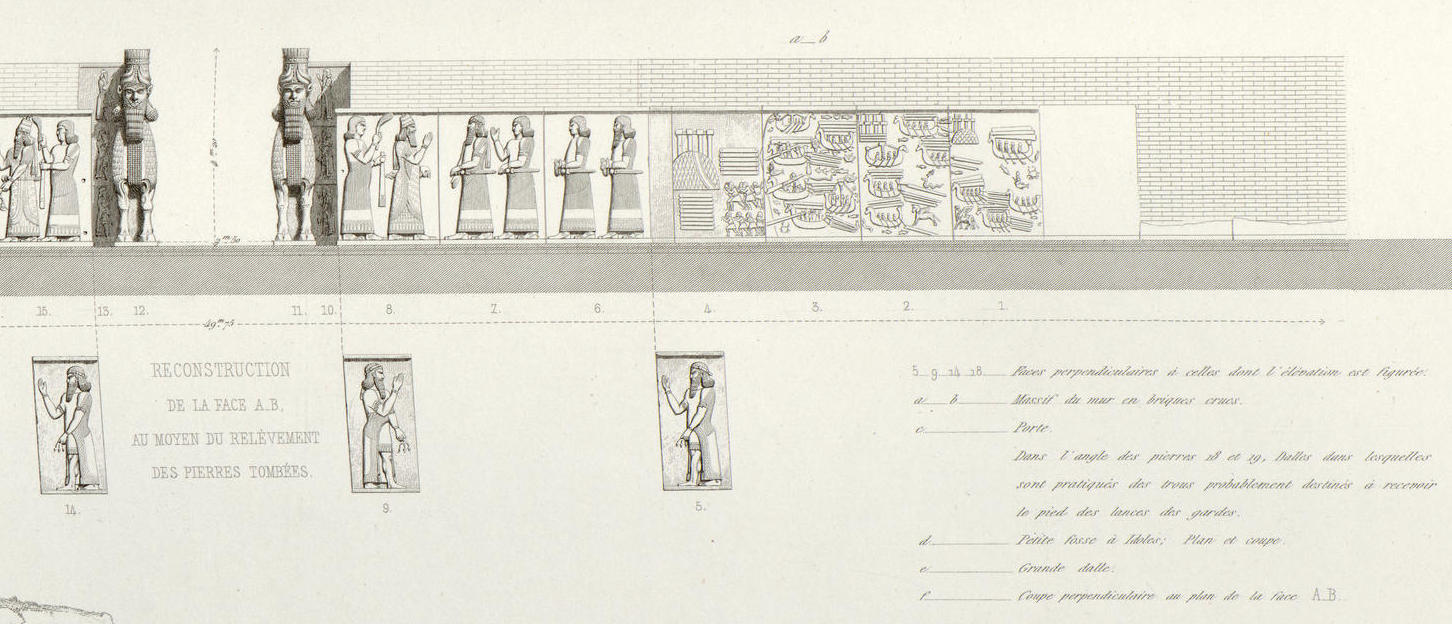
Botta overview

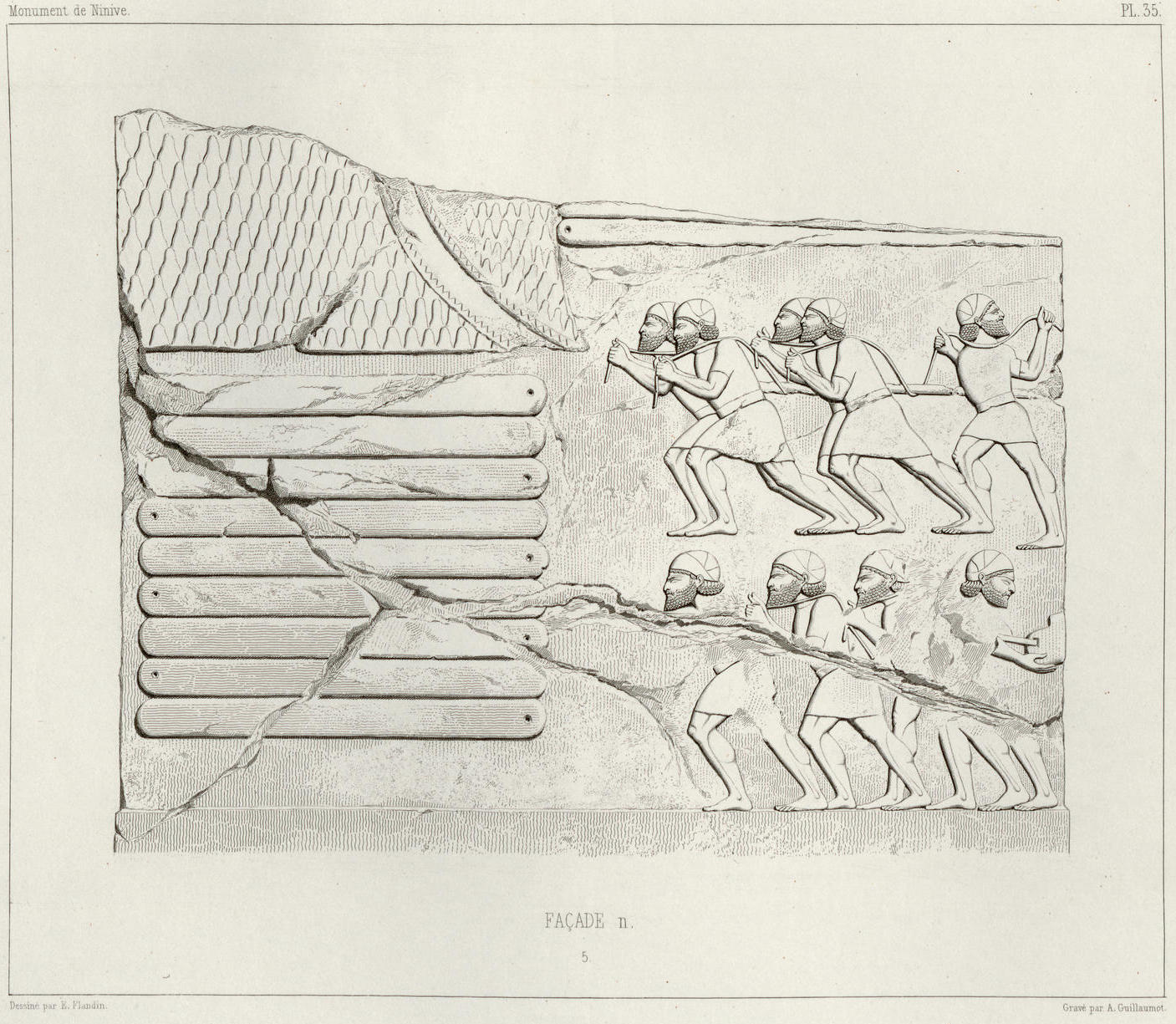
Botta illustration 1849

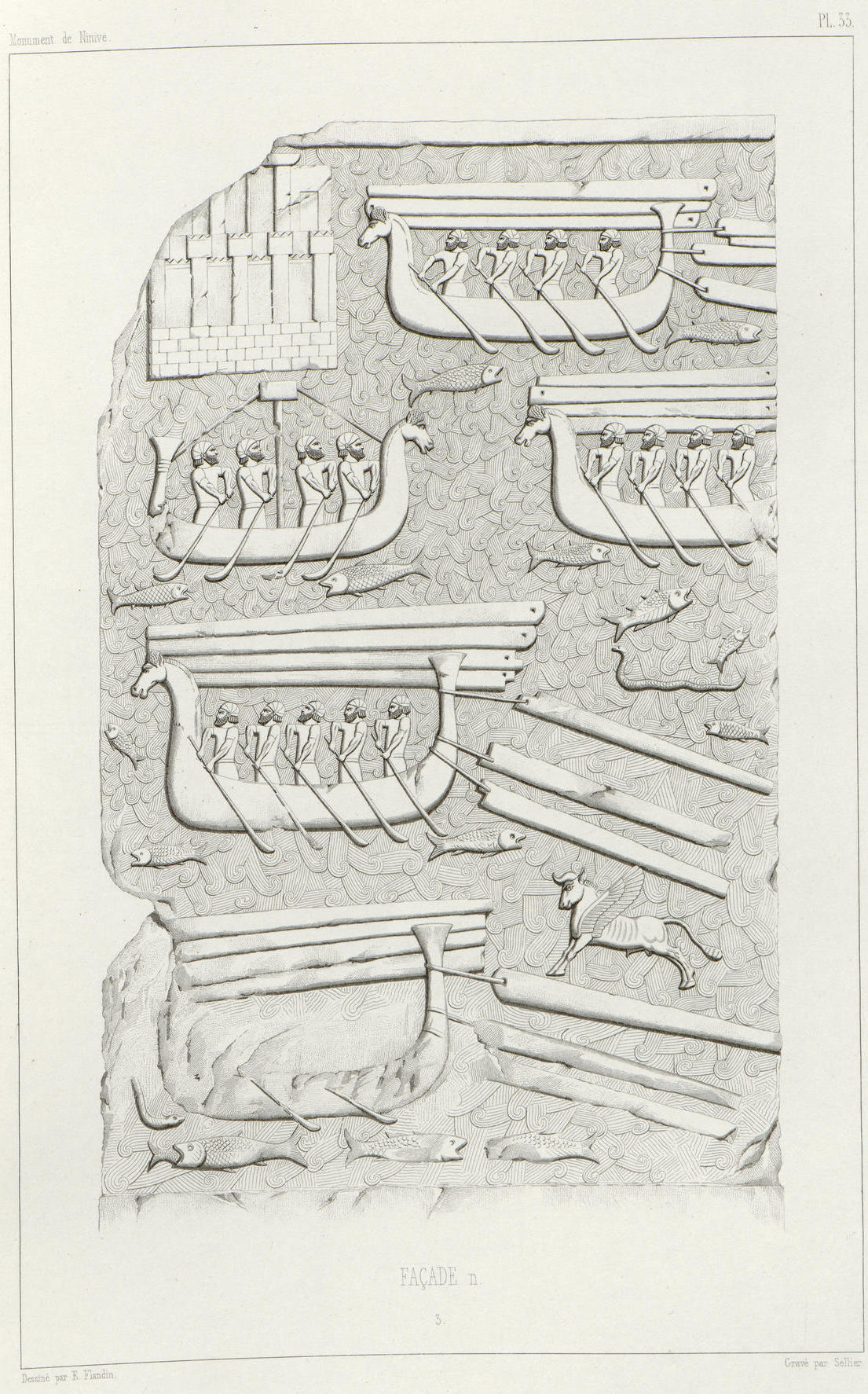
Botta illustration 1849

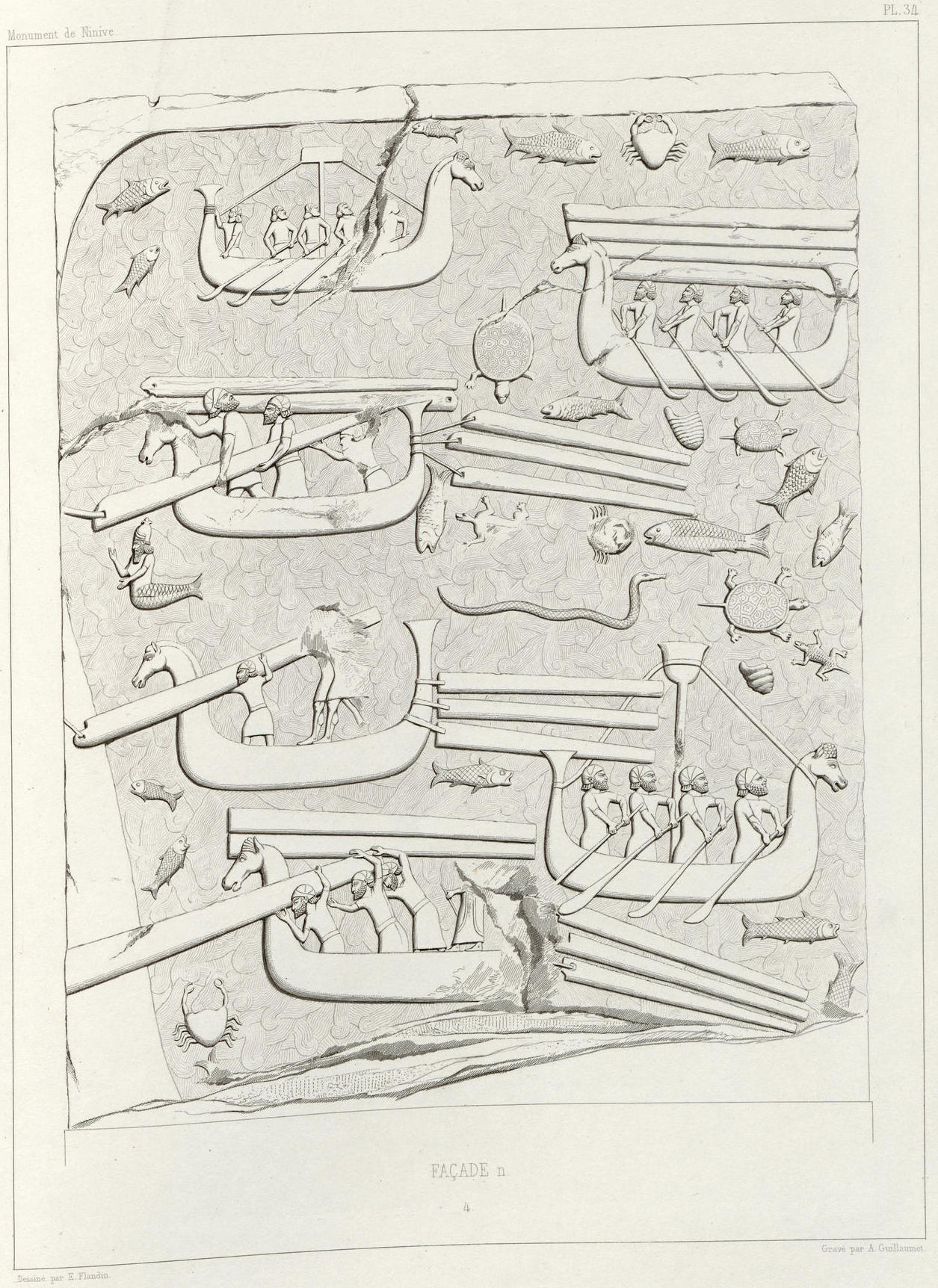
Botta illustration 1849
