= Carlo Giuseppe Guglielmo Botta =

Italian historian

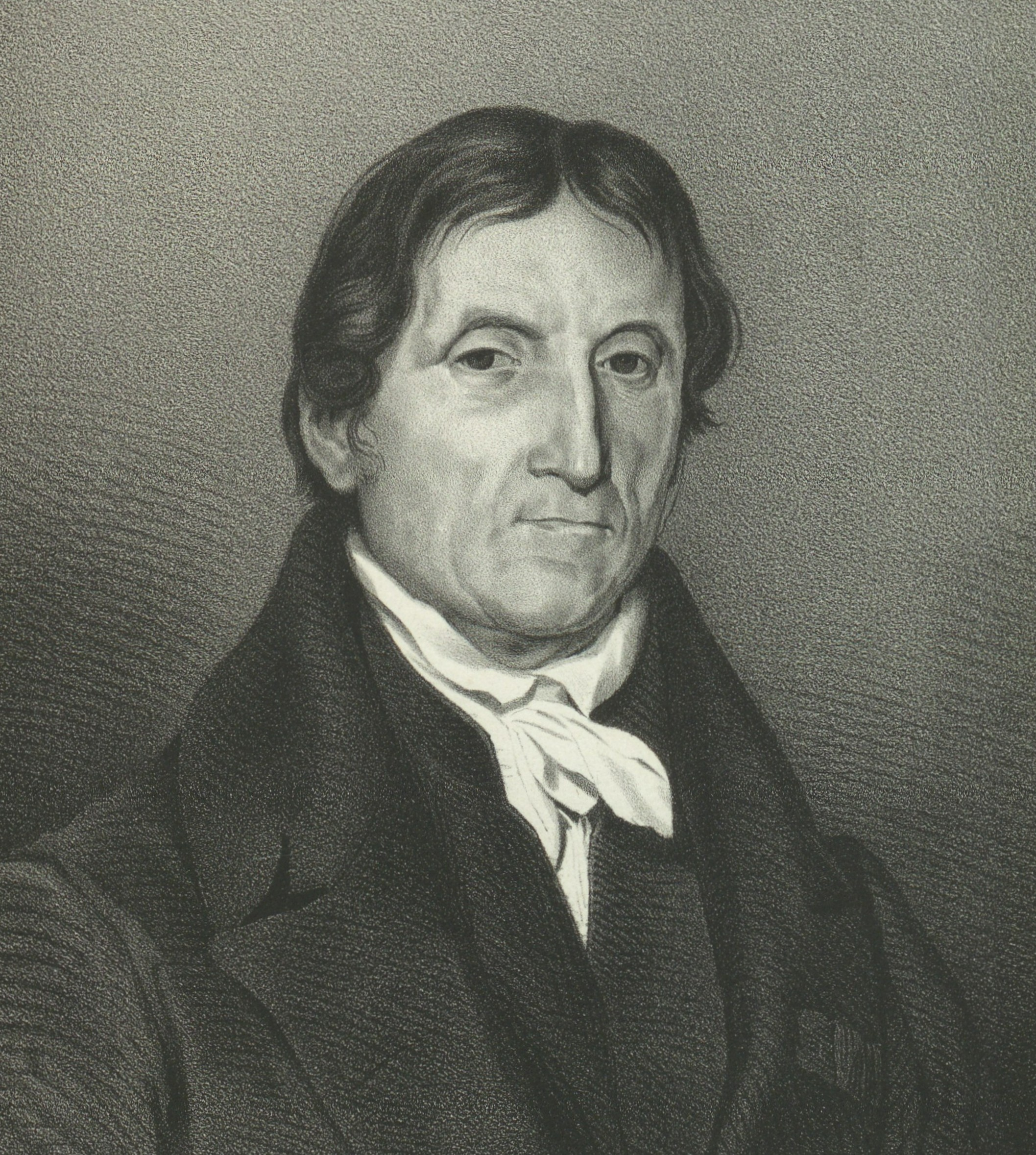
- Born: November 6, 1766; San Giorgio Canavese, Piedmont
- Died: August 10, 1837 (aged 70); Paris, France

Academic background
- Education: University of Turin

Carlo Giuseppe Guglielmo Botta (November 6, 1766, in San Giorgio Canavese, Piedmont – August 10, 1837, in Paris) was an Italian historian.

== Biography ==
He was born at San Giorgio Canavese in Piedmont. He studied medicine at the University of Turin, and obtained his doctor's degree when about twenty years old. Having rendered himself obnoxious to the government during the political commotions that followed the French Revolution, he was imprisoned for over a year; and upon his release in 1795, he withdrew to France, only to return to his native country as a surgeon in the French army, whose progress he followed as far as Venice. Here he joined the expedition to Corfu, from which he did not return to Italy until 1798. At first, he favored French policy in Italy, contributed to the annexation of Piedmont by France in 1799, and was an admirer of Napoleon, but he afterwards changed his views, realizing the necessity for the union of all Italians and for their freedom from foreign control.

After the separation of Piedmont from France in 1814, he retired into private life, but, fearing persecution at home, became a French citizen. In 1817, he was appointed rector of the University of Rouen, but in 1822 was removed owing to clerical influence. Amid all the vicissitudes of his early manhood, Botta had never allowed his pen to be long idle, and in the political quiet that followed 1816, he naturally devoted himself more exclusively to literature. Botta was elected a member of the American Philosophical Society in 1816 and a member of the American Antiquarian Society in 1821. In 1824 he published a history of Italy from 1789 to 1814 (4 vols.), on which his fame principally rests; he himself had been an eyewitness of many of the events described. His continuation of Guicciardini, which he was afterwards encouraged to undertake, is a careful and laborious work, but is not based on original authorities and is of small value.

Though living in Paris, a careful exclusion of all Gallicisms, as a reaction against the French influences of the day, is one of the marked features of his style.

== Death ==
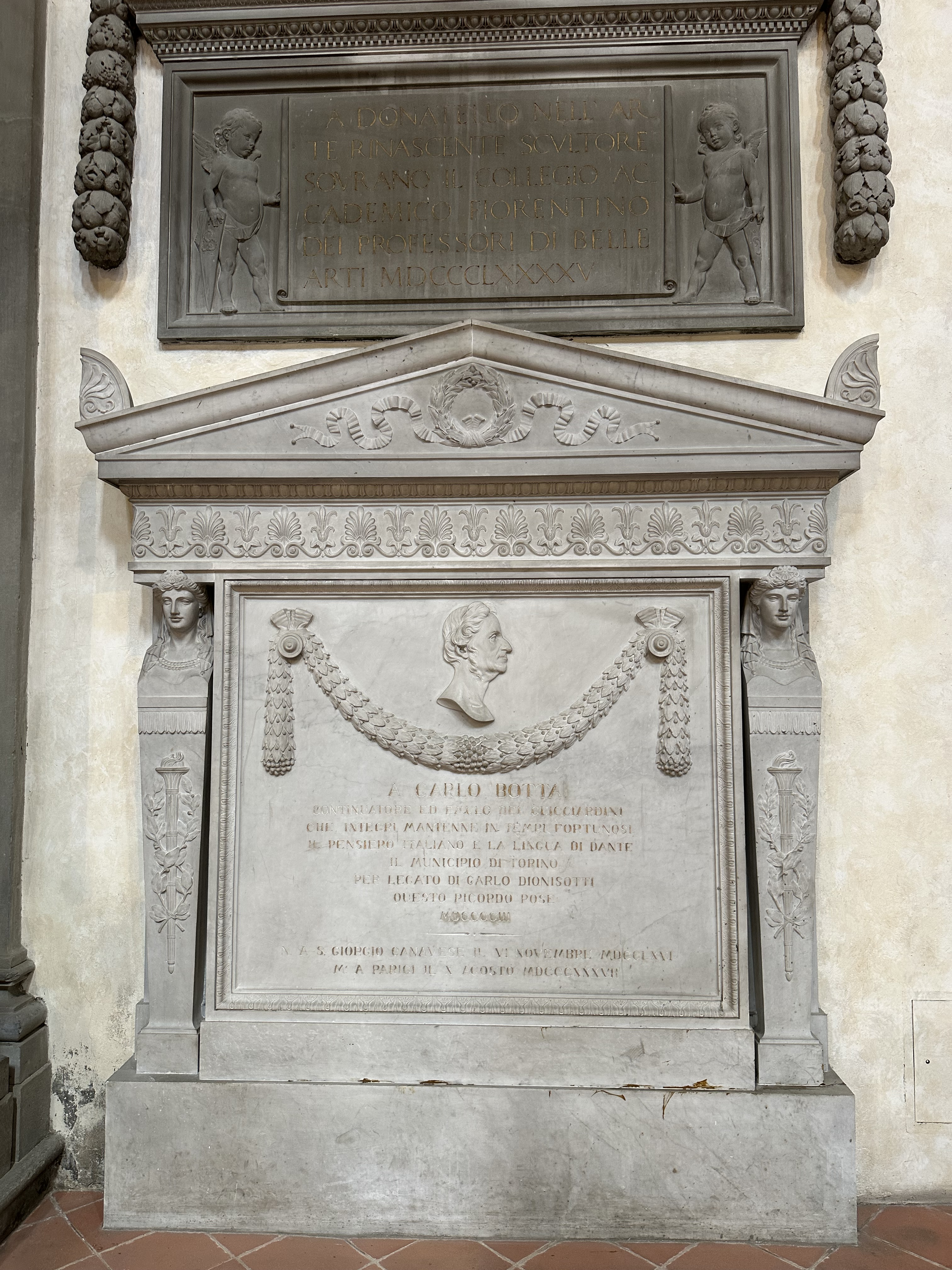
Carlo Botta tomb at Santa Croce, Florence

Botta died at Paris on August 10, 1837, in comparative poverty, but in the enjoyment of an extensive and well-earned reputation.

== Family ==
His son, Paul-Émile Botta (1802–1870), was a distinguished traveller and Assyrian archaeologist, whose excavations at Khorsabad (1843) were among the first efforts in the line of investigation afterwards pursued by Layard.

== Works ==
The works of Carlo Botta are:

- Storia naturale e medica deli Isola di Corfu (1798)
- an Italian translation of Born's Joannis Physiophili specimen monachologiae (1801);
- Souvenirs d'un voyage en Dalmatie (1802)
- Storia della guerra dell' Independenza d'America (1809)
- Camillo, a poem (1815)
- Storia d'Italia dal 1789 al 1814 (1824, new ed., Prato, 1862);
- Storia d'Italia in continuazione al Guicciardini (1832, new ed, Milan, 1878).
