= Eugène Flandin =

French scholar, artist and politician (1809–1889)

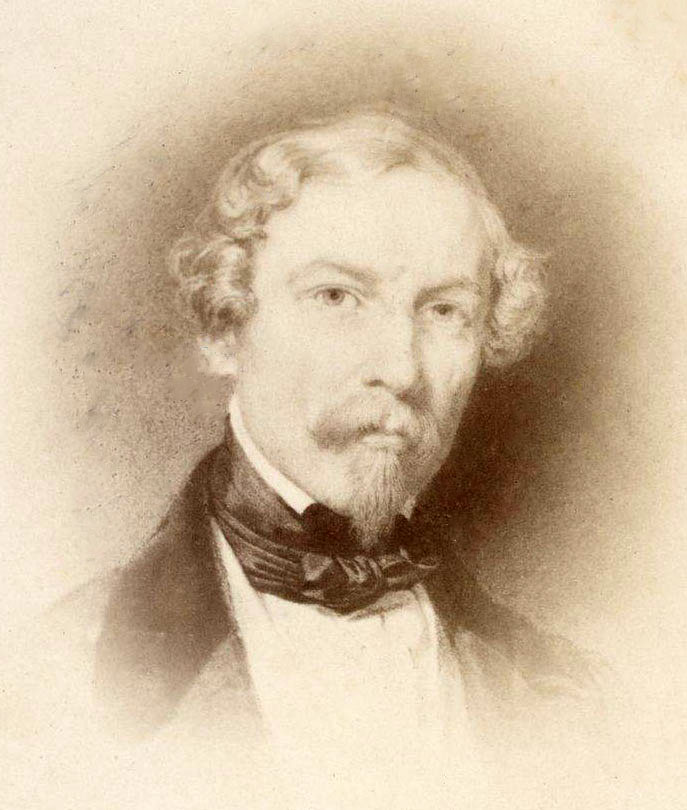
- Born: Jean-Baptiste Eugène Napoléon Flandin; 15 August 1809; Naples, French Empire
- Died: 29 September 1889 (aged 80); Tours, France

Jean-Baptiste Eugène Napoléon Flandin (15 August 1809 in Naples – 29 September 1889 in Tours), French orientalist, painter, archaeologist, and politician. Flandin's archeological drawings and some of his military paintings are valued more highly by museum authorities than his purely artistic paintings. He is most renowned for his famous drawings and paintings of Iranian monuments, landscapes, and social life made during his travels with the architect Pascal Coste between 1839 and 1841. Flandin's observations on Iran and international politics in the mid-19th century also continue to provide important documentary information.

== First Trip to Iran ==
In 1839, Flandin was, along with Coste, made a laureate of the Institut de France, and they both joined the embassy of the Comte de Sercey to Iran (1839–41). After parting from de Sercey's mission, they left Isfahan (31 May 1841) with very limited financial means and retinue. They pursued their periplus towards Hamadān, Kangāvar, Bīsotūn, Ḥolwān, etc. They went back to Isfahan and then on to Shiraz and the Persian Gulf (Būšehr), returning to Tehran via Shiraz, Isfahan, and Kashan. They then traveled to Tabrīz, where disastrous sanitary conditions hampered their return through Trabzon or Tiflis so that they had to take the Tabrīz-Baghdad route through Kurdistan instead. Flandin's courage during this journey was praised by Coste, who also noted his intrepidity and his violent temper (Notes I, pp. 162 f., 367 f.). Their timetable and work were strictly organized. After Flandin's return to France, he was awarded the Légion d’honneur.

== Archaeological work ==
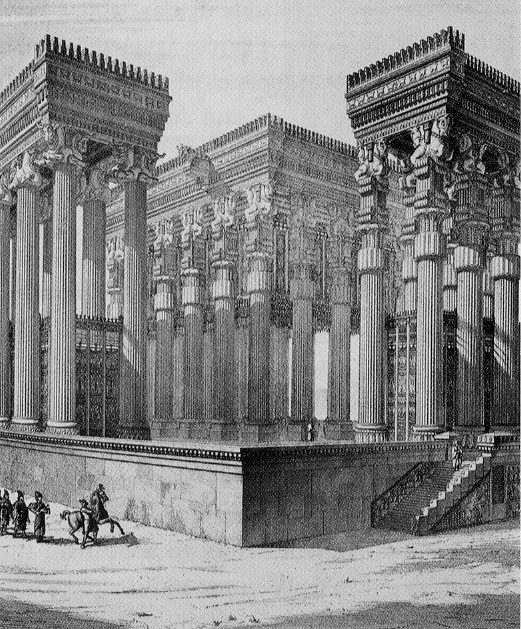
A 19th-century reconstruction of Persepolis, by Flandin and Pascal Coste

In March 1843, after fruitless searching for the site of Nineveh, Paul-Émile Botta (1802–70) discovered the Assyrian capital of Dur Sharrukin on the site of modern Khorsabad. Botta mistook the place for the actual site of Nineveh (Assyro-Babylonian cuneiform had not yet been deciphered). In October, Flandin was appointed to Botta's mission by the Académie des inscriptions et belles-lettres to draw the excavated remains and inscriptions. He also participated in the excavations which ended in October 1844.

== Significance of his writings ==
Despite its many predecessors, Flandin's Voyage en Perse remains a model of its kind and an important source, particularly on early Qajar Iran, due to both its text and its illustrations. It provides many precious observations on history, archeology, arts, architecture, geography, social and court life, royal and provincial administration, military organization, etc. Itineraries are carefully noted. A table of distances between clearly identified stages is given in “time necessary at the ordinary pace of a horse”.

Flandin was trained in classical, military, and Orientalist painting; archeological drawing; writing and reporting; military and civil administration. His work included observations, accounts, and pictures. There is hardly any illustrated book on Iran, particularly one dealing with the Qajar era, without reproductions of his celebrated paintings of monuments, bazaars, personages and costumes, street scenes, landscapes, etc. All this work, supplemented with precise written observations, was accomplished despite the many hardships endured by Coste and Flandin during their travels. However, Flandin's work in archeological drawing was, soon after his Oriental expeditions, superseded by the new art of photography. Daguerreotype and calotype made it possible to prepare pictures, notably of archeological remains, quickly and precisely, although archeological drawing still remains an indispensable complement to research and publication.

== See also ==
- List of Orientalist artists
- Orientalism
