= Dur-Sharrukin =

Assyrian capital in the time of Sargon II; located in modern-day Iraq

Dur-Šarru-kīn
- 𒂦𒈗𒁺 (Akkadian)
- Khorsabad
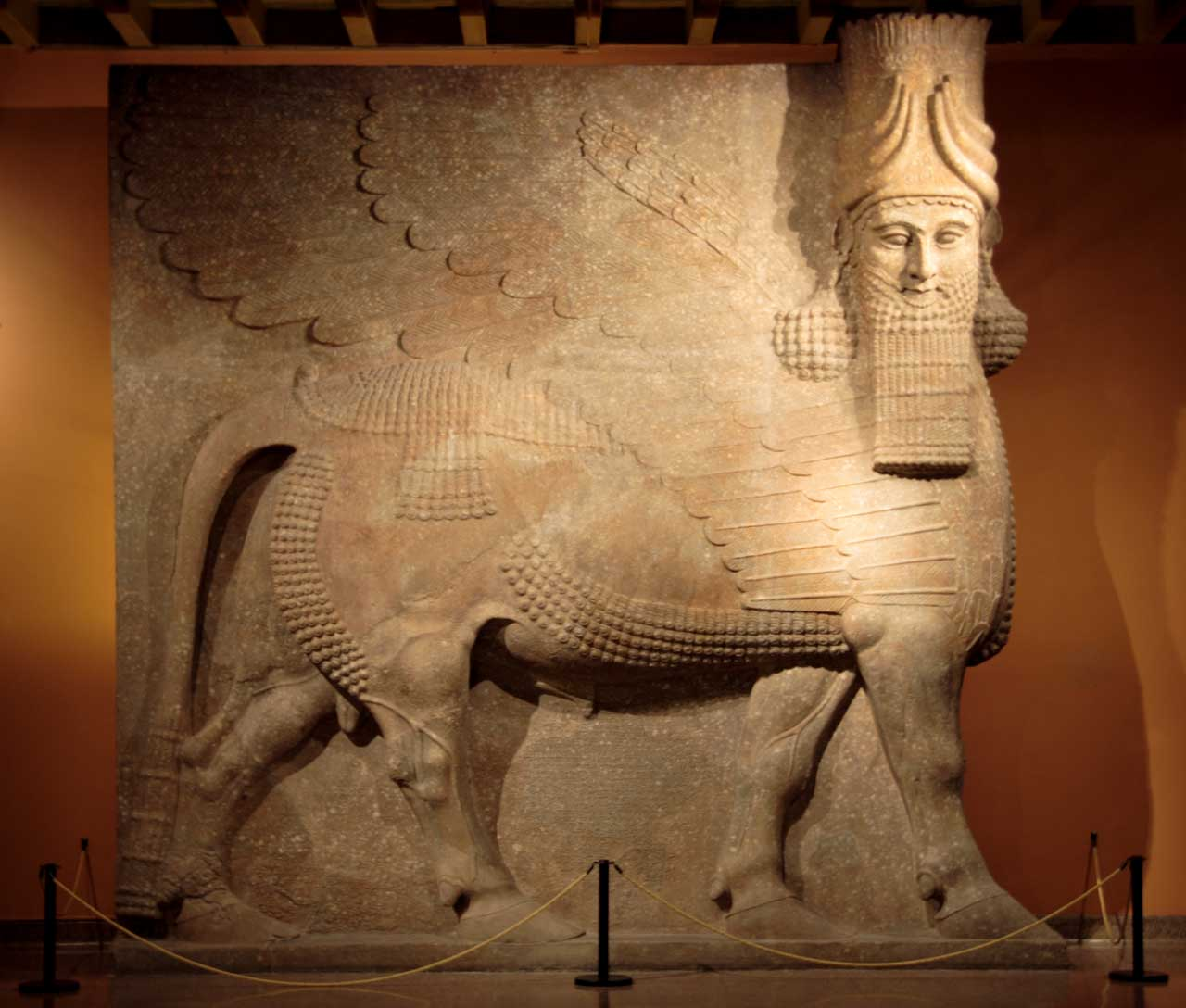
- A human-headed winged bull known as a lamassu from Dur-Sharrukin. Neo-Assyrian Period, c. 721–705 BC

- Location within Iraq
- 36°30′34″N 43°13′46″E
- Type: Settlement
- Periods: Neo-Assyrian Empire
- Cultures: Assyrian
- Location: Khorsabad, Nineveh Governorate, Iraq
- Region: Mesopotamia

History
- Built: In the decade preceding 706 BC
- Abandoned: Approximately 605 BC

Site notes
- Length: 1,760 m (5,770 ft)
- Width: 1,635 m (5,364 ft)
- Area: 2.88 km^{2} (1.11 sq mi)
- Excavation dates: 1842–1844, 1852–1855 1928–1935, 1957
- Archaeologists: Paul-Émile Botta, Eugène Flandin, Victor Place, Edward Chiera, Gordon Loud, Hamilton Darby, Fuad Safar
- Condition: Severely Damaged
- Public access: Inaccessible

Dur-Sharrukin (Neo-Assyrian Akkadian: 𒂦𒈗𒁺, romanized: Dūr Šarru-kīn, "Fortress of Sargon"; Arabic: دور شروكين, Syriac: ܕܘܪ ܫܪܘ ܘܟܢ), present day Khorsabad, was the Assyrian capital in the time of Sargon II of Assyria. Khorsabad is a village in northern Iraq, 15 km northeast of Mosul. The great city was entirely built in the decade preceding 706 BC. After the unexpected death of Sargon in battle, the capital was moved 20 km south to Nineveh.

== History ==
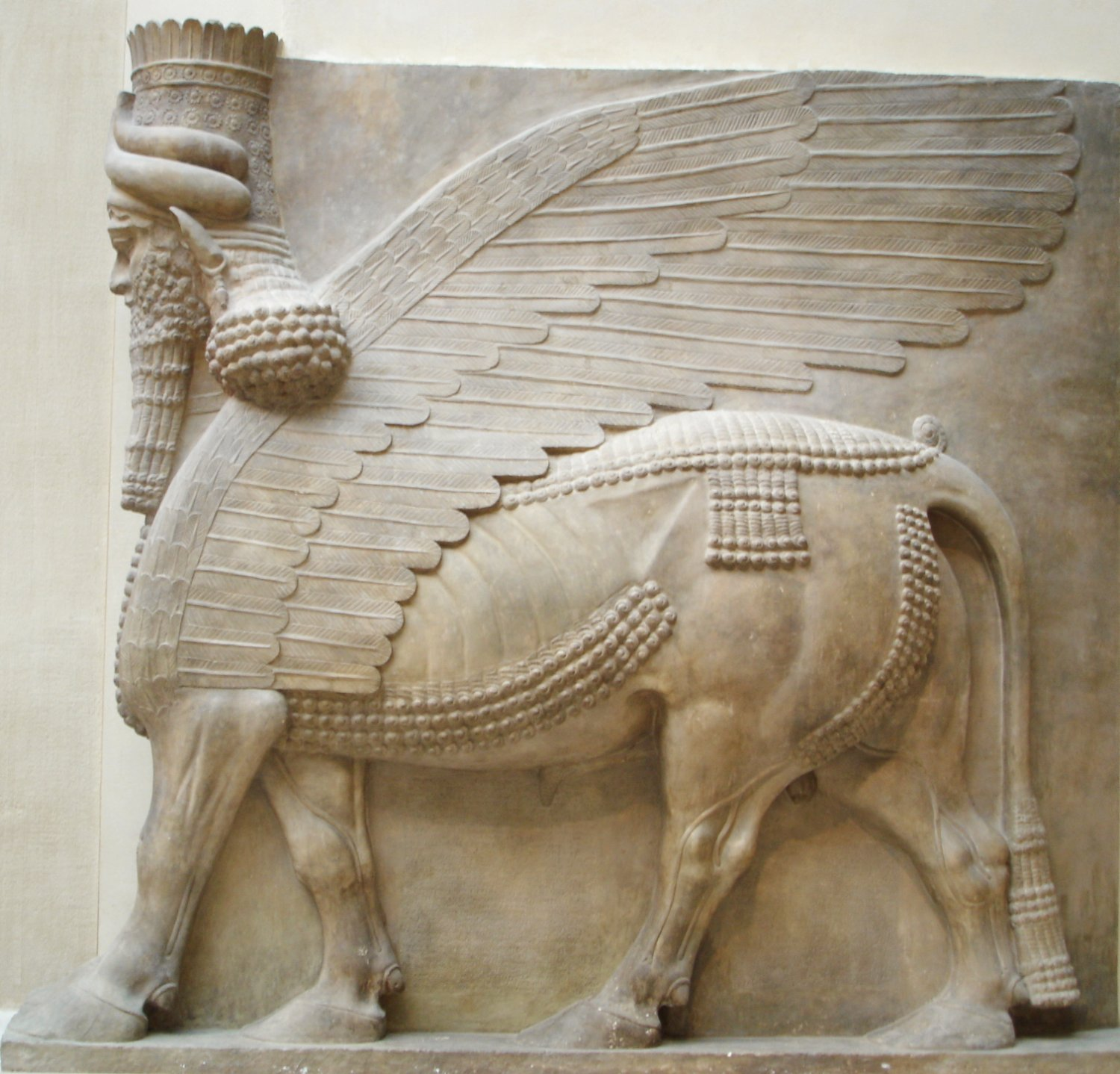
Lamassu found during Botta's excavation, now in the Louvre Museum.

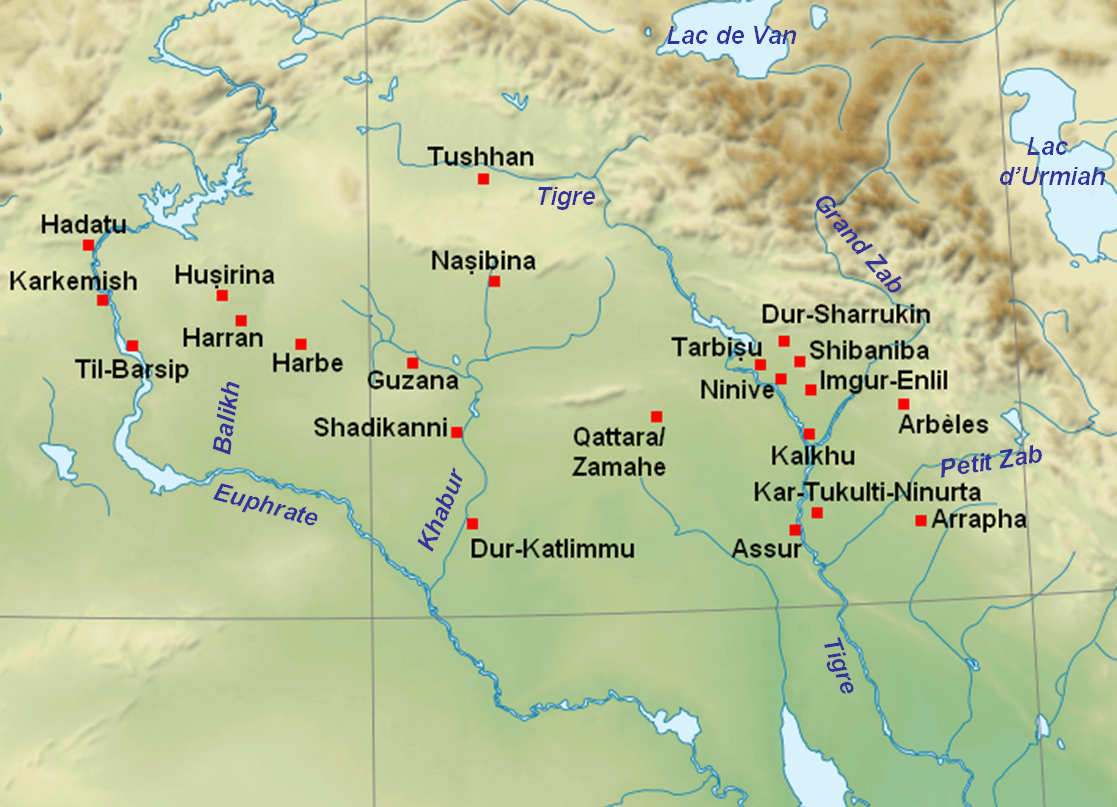
Mesopotamia in the Neo-Assyrian period (place names in French)

Sargon II ruled from 722 to 705 BC. The demands for timber and other materials and craftsmen, who came from as far as coastal Phoenicia, are documented in contemporary Assyrian letters. The debts of construction workers were nullified in order to attract a sufficient labour force. The land in the environs of the town was taken under cultivation, and olive groves were planted to increase Assyria's deficient oil-production. The great city was entirely built in the decade preceding 706 BC, when the court moved to Dur-Sharrukin, although it was not completely finished yet. Sargon was killed during a battle in 705. After his unexpected death his son and successor Sennacherib abandoned the project, and relocated the capital with its administration to the city of Nineveh, 20 km south. The city was never completed and it was finally abandoned a century later when the Assyrian empire fell.

=== Destruction by ISIL ===
On 8 March 2015 the Islamic State of Iraq and the Levant reportedly started the plunder and demolition of Dur-Sharrukin, according to a Kurdish official from Mosul, Saeed Mamuzini. The Iraqi Tourism and Antiquities Ministry launched the related investigation on the same day. Only one looting tunnel has been found.

== Description ==
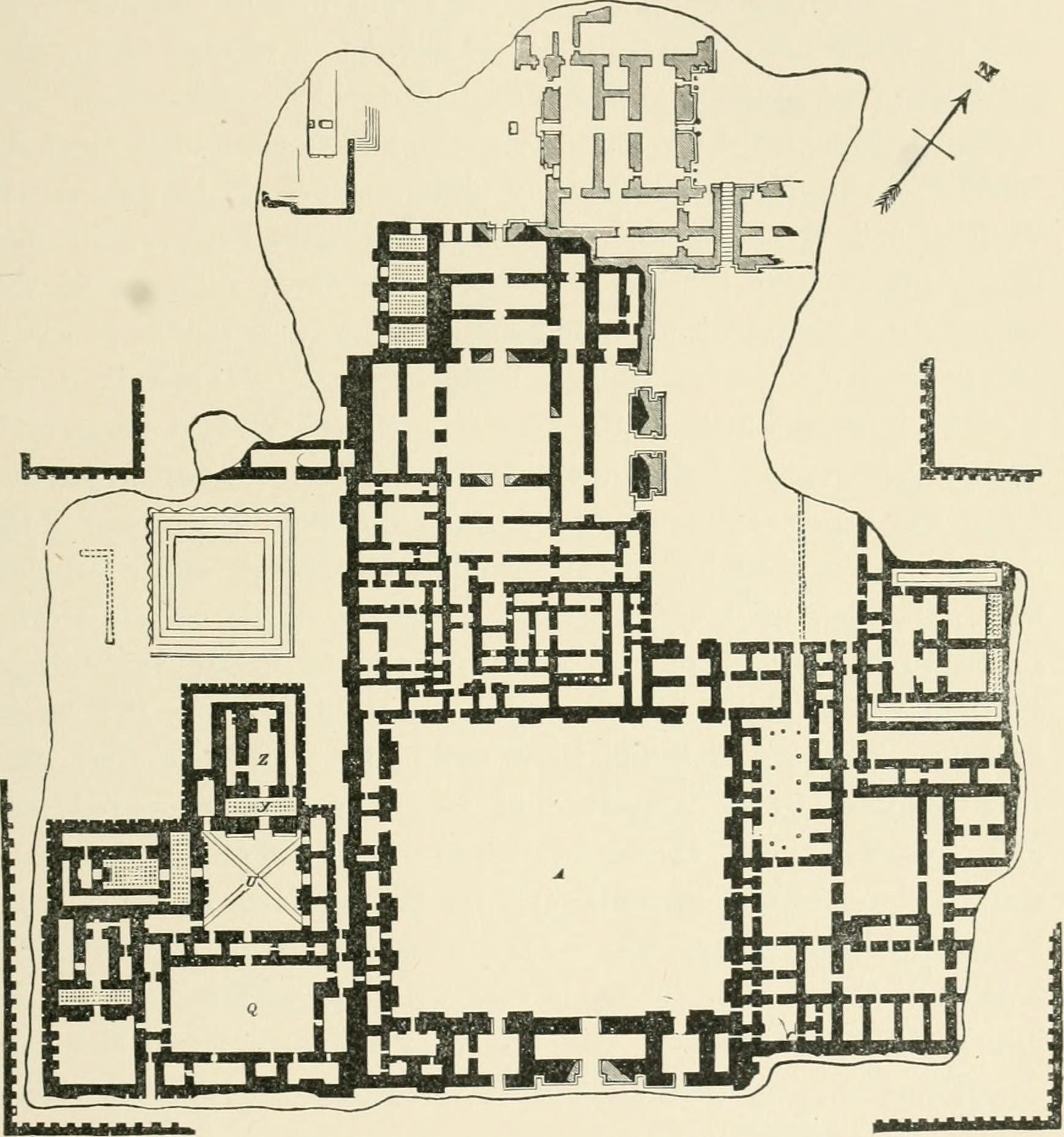
Plan of Palace of Sargon Khorsabad Reconstruction 1905

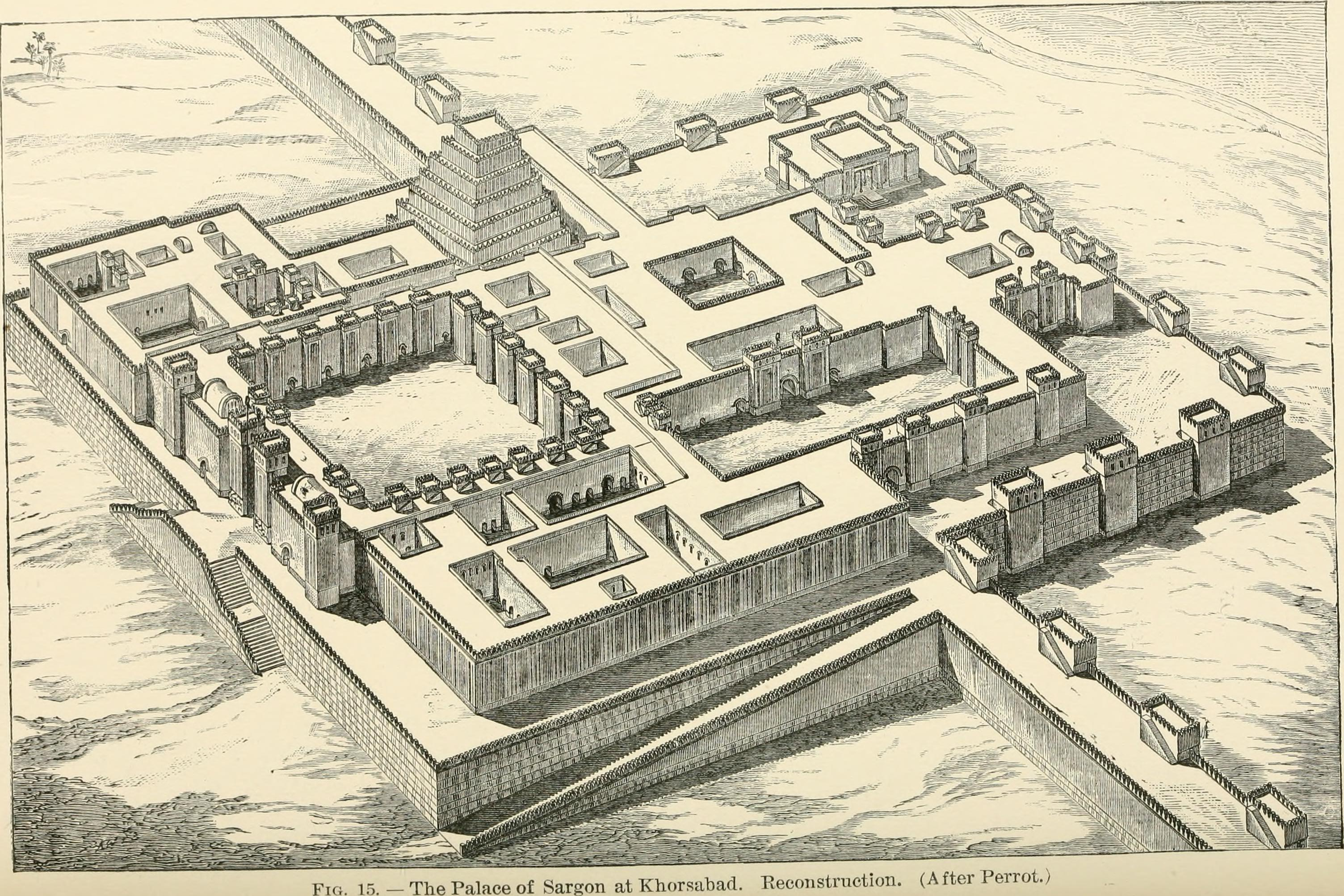
Reconstructed Model of Palace of Sargon at Khorsabad 1905

The town was of rectangular layout and measured 1758.6 by 1635 metres. The enclosed area comprised 3 square kilometres, or 288 hectares. The length of the walls was 16280 Assyrian units, which according to Sargon himself corresponded to the numerical value of his name. The city walls were massive and 157 towers protected its sides. Seven gates entered the city from all directions. A walled terrace contained temples and the royal palace. The main temples were dedicated to the gods Nabu, Shamash and Sin, while Adad, Ningal and Ninurta had smaller shrines. A temple tower, ziggurat, was also constructed, which notably displays the only confirmed ziggurat with a helical ramp, rather than staircases directly up to the prominence. The palace complex was situated on the northern wall of the city. At the entrance of the palace were a ramp and a large doorway with the god-protector of the city Lamassu on one side. The palace was adorned with sculptures and wall reliefs, and the gates were flanked with winged-bull shedu statues weighing up to 40 tons. Sargon supposedly lost at least one of these winged bulls in the river.

In the south-west corner of the city was located a secondary citadel, used as a control point against internal riots and foreign invasions. In addition to the great city, there was a royal hunting park and a garden that included "all the aromatic plants of Hatti and the fruit-trees of every mountain", a "record of power and conquest", as Robin Lane Fox has observed. Surviving correspondence mentions the moving of thousands of young fruit trees, quinces, almonds, apples and medlars.

On the central canal of Sargon's garden stood a pillared pleasure-pavilion which looked up to a great topographic creation: a man-made Garden Mound. This Mound was planted with cedars and cypresses and was modelled after a foreign landscape, the Amanus mountains in north Syria, which had so amazed the Assyrian kings. In their flat palace-gardens they built a replica of what they had encountered.

== Archaeology ==
Dur-Sharrukin is roughly a square with a border marked by a city wall 24 meters thick with a stone foundation pierced by seven massive gates. A mound in the north-east section marks the location of the palace of Sargon II. At the time of its construction, the village on the site was named Maganuba.

=== Early excavations ===
While Dur-Sharrukin was abandoned in antiquity and thus did not attract the same level of attention as other ancient Assyrian sites, there was some awareness of the origins of the mound well before European excavation. For instance, the medieval Arab geographer Yaqut Al-Hamawi recorded that the site was called Saraoun or Saraghoun, which demonstrates the original Assyrian name was not completely forgotten before the city's rediscovery. He also reported that shortly after the early Muslim conquests, "considerable treasures were found amongst the ruins," though the extent of these early excavations are unknown. It was during the medieval period as well that the village of Khorsabad was founded on the top of the mound.

Once the European presence in northern Iraq became more substantial in the mid-nineteenth century, archaeological exploration of the site of Dur-Sharrukin was neglected in favor of seemingly more promising sites such as Nineveh or Nimrud. This situation changed in April 1843, when the French Consul General at Mosul, Paul-Émile Botta, who had been excavating at Kuyunjik (the contemporary village atop the mound of Nineveh) without success, was approached by a resident of the village of Khorsabad. The English archaeologist Austen Henry Layard recorded the event as follows:

"The small party employed by M. Botta were at work on Kouyunjik, when a peasant from a distant village chanced to visit the spot. Seeing that every fragment of brick and alabaster uncovered by the workmen was carefully preserved, he asked the reason of this, to him, strange proceeding. On being informed that they were in search of sculptured stones, he advised them to try the mound on which his village was built, and in which, he declared, many such things as they wanted had been exposed on digging for the foundations of new houses. M. Botta, having been frequently deceived by similar stories, was not at first inclined to follow the peasant's advice, but subsequently sent an agent and one or two workmen to the place. After a little opposition from the inhabitants, they were permitted to sink a well in the mound; and at a small distance from the surface they came to the top of a wall which, on digging deeper, they found to be built of sculptured slabs of gypsum. M. Botta, on receiving information of this discovery, went at once to the village, which was called Khorsabad. He directed a wider trench to be formed, and to be carried in the direction of the wall. He soon found that he had entered a chamber, connected with others, and surrounded by slabs of gypsum covered with sculptured representations of battles, sieges, and similar events. His wonder may easily be imagined. A new history had been suddenly opened to him-the records of an unknown people were before him."

The interplay between local mediators and European archaeologists in Layard's account effectively captures the necessary cooperation which enabled these early discoveries. With this initial excavation, the archaeological investigation of ancient Mesopotamia began in earnest. Unlike Kuyunjik, the Assyrian ruins at Khorsabad were much closer to the surface of the mound, and therefore it was not long before Botta and his team reached the ancient palace, leading to the discovery of numerous reliefs and sculptures.

Unfortunately, this excitement was somewhat dulled by the destruction of many of these early discoveries due to sudden exposure to the outside environment. Botta's consular duties also took up a majority of his time, preventing him from organizing systematic excavations of the site, and local Ottoman authorities grew suspicious of the true intentions behind the excavations, which at this time were technically illegal, as Botta had yet to receive official permission from Constantinople for his work, a common situation with early European excavations. These difficulties caused formal excavations to cease by October 1843. Still, Botta's initial reports back to France sparked considerable scholarly interest in the project, and eventually he received more funding and an artist, Eugène Flandin, from France. By spring of 1844 then, Botta resumed further excavations of the site, which required him to purchase the village of Khorsabad itself and resettle it at the foot of the mound. However, this new site was in swampy terrain, and malaria and other diseases were a constant threat to the residents and workers. The extensive finds convinced Botta that he had uncovered the true site of Nineveh, though this would be subsequently refuted by excavations at Kuyunjik by Layard and others.

By October of that year, Botta had uncovered enough of the palace to cease further excavations and attempt to deliver some of the findings to France, which required an extensive operation of carts to transport the reliefs and sculptures to Mosul, which were then transported by raft and ship to Basra on the Persian Gulf and then to Paris, where they arrived in 1847. These were the first major Assyrian finds to arrive in Europe, and they fuelled a growing fascination with the ancient civilization which would lead to further excavations.

=== Qurnah disaster ===
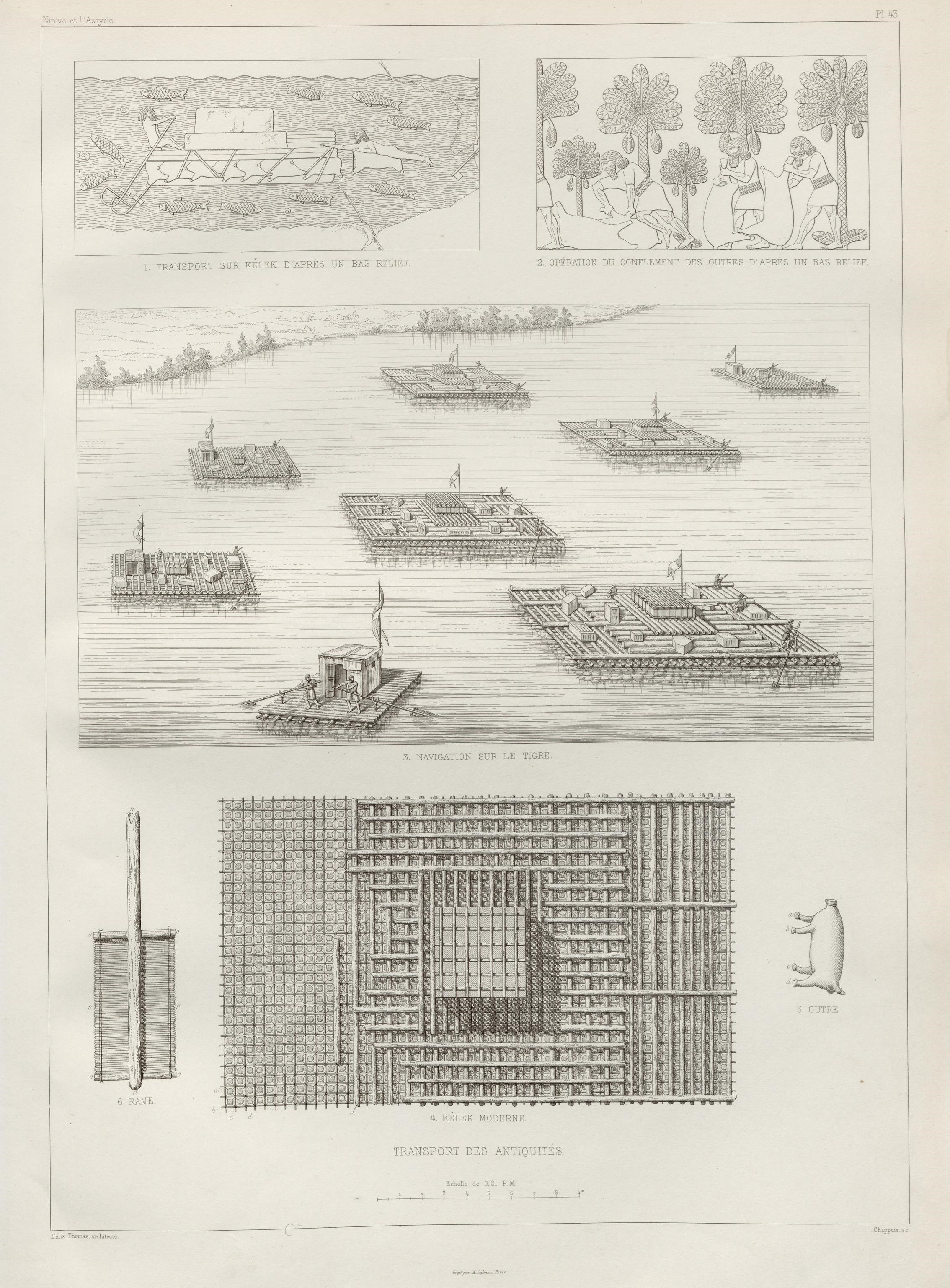
Convoy of rafts (Keleks) floating down the Tigris river loaded with antiquities in 1855 (V Place 1867)

By 1852, excavations of the site had been resumed by the new French consul, Victor Place, and in 1855 another shipment of antiquities was ready to be sent back to Paris. A cargo ship and four rafts were prepared to carry the artifacts, but even this substantial effort was over-whelmed by the sheer number of items to be transported. Additionally, shortly after the convoy reached Baghdad, Place was summoned to his new consular post in Moldavia due to the ongoing Crimean War, and had to leave the shipment in the hands of a French schoolteacher, M. Clement to finalise its return to Paris.

More antiquities from Rawlinson's expedition to Kuyunjik and Fresnel's to Babylon were also added to the shipment. The troubles began once the convoy left Baghdad in May 1855, as the banks of the river Tigris were controlled by local sheikhs who were hostile to the Ottoman authorities and frequently raided shipping sailing by. During the journey, the convoy was boarded several times, forcing the crew to relinquish most of their money and supplies in order to be allowed further passage on the river.

Once the convoy reached Al-Qurnah (Kurnah) it was assaulted by local pirates led by Sheikh Abu Saad, whose actions sank the main cargo ship and forced the four rafts aground shortly afterwards. The entire shipment was almost completely lost, with only 28 of over 200 crates eventually making it to the Louvre in Paris. Subsequent efforts to recover the lost antiquities, including a Japanese expedition in 1971–1972, have largely been unsuccessful.

=== 20th century excavations ===
The site of Khorsabad was excavated between 1928–1935 by American archaeologists from the Institute for the Study of Ancient Cultures in Chicago. Work in the first season was led by Edward Chiera and concentrated on the palace area. A colossal lamassu estimated to weigh 40 tons was uncovered outside the throne room. It was found split into three large fragments. The torso alone weighed about 20 tons. This was shipped to Chicago. The remaining seasons were led by Gordon Loud and Hamilton Darby. Their work examined one of the city gates, continued work at the palace, and excavated extensively at the palace's temple complex. Since Dur-Sharrukin was a single-period site that was evacuated in an orderly manner after the death of Sargon II, few individual objects were found. The primary discoveries from Khorsabad shed light on Assyrian art and architecture.

In 1957, archaeologists from the Iraqi Department Antiquities led by Fuad Safar excavated at the site, uncovering the Temple of Sibitti.

=== 21st century excavations ===
Archeologists returned to excavating in the area in 2023, after political conditions had limited their work in early 21st century, and unearthed in Dur-Sharrukin a massive sculpture of lamassu weighing almost 20 tons. It had been first documented in the 19th century, then partially excavated in the 1990s, and later reburied to safeguard it. The head of the statue was missing as it had been removed by looters decades ago. It had later been retrieved by Iraqi authorities, and is currently on display in the Iraq Museum in Baghdad.

== Gallery ==
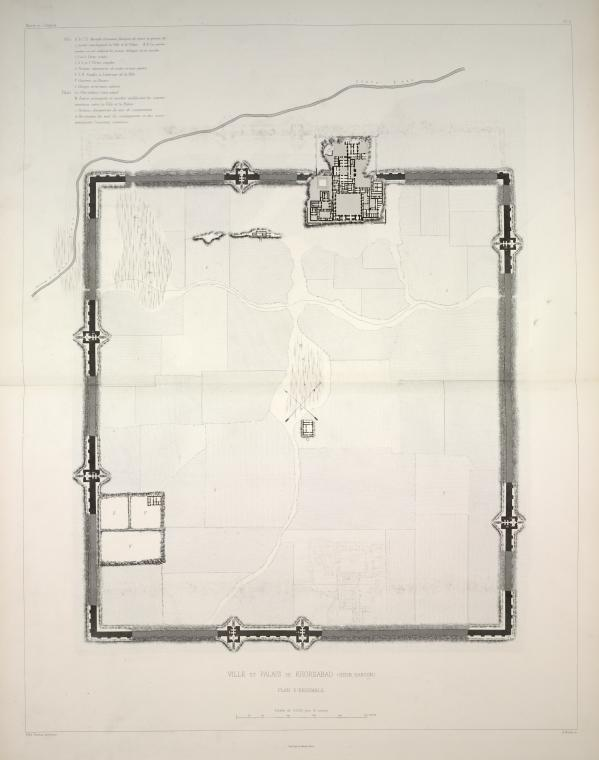
Plan of Dur-Sharrukin, 1867

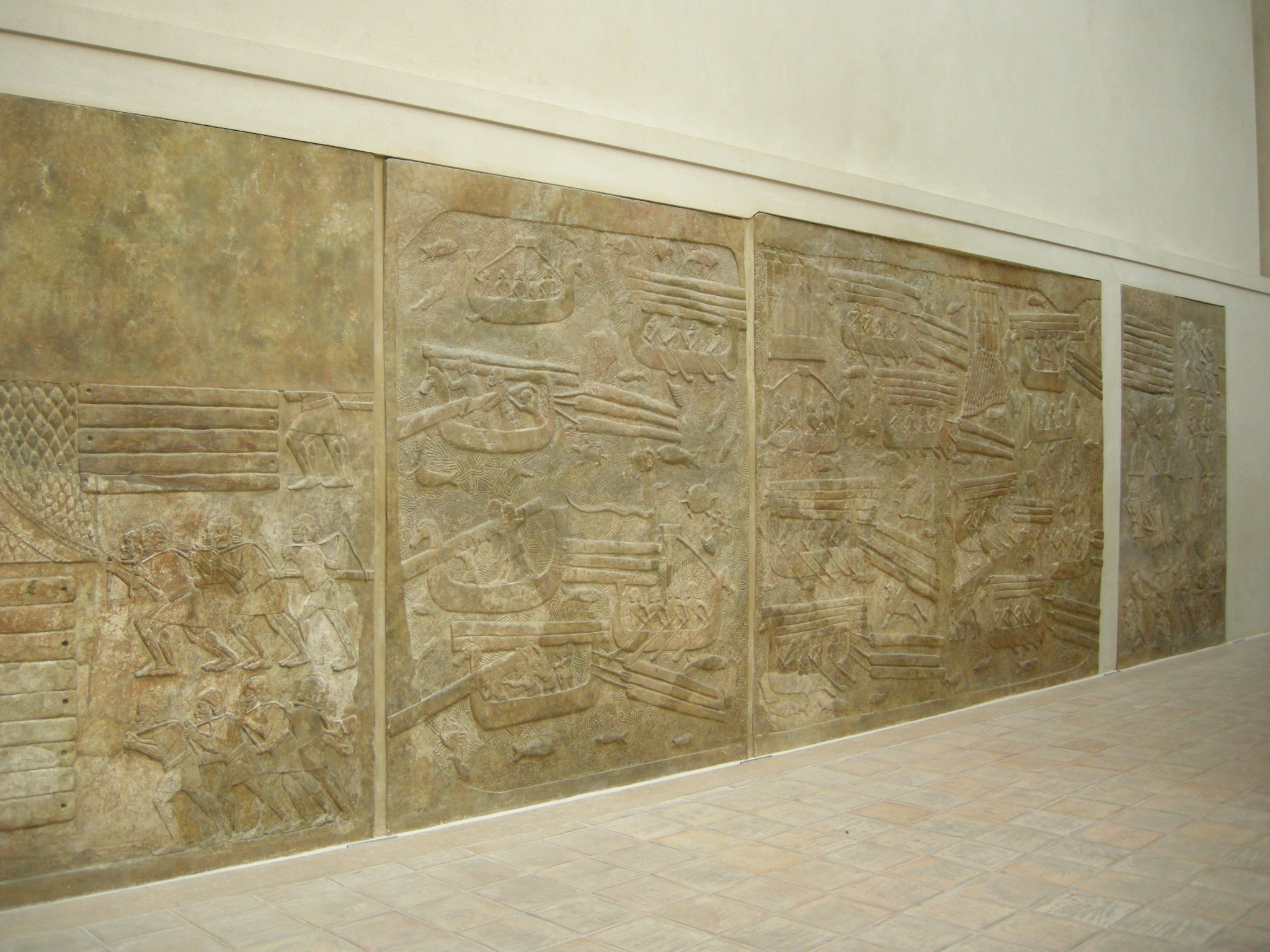
The Timber Transportation relief at the Louvre

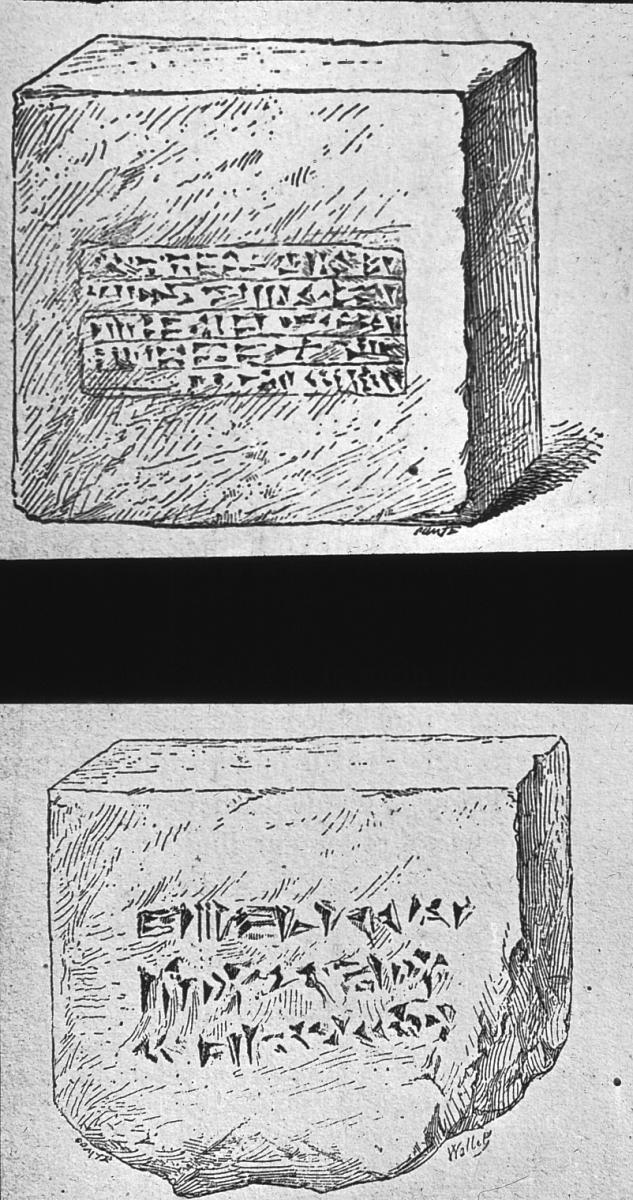
Khorsabad brick, Assyria. Babylonian; Louvre Brooklyn Museum Archives, Goodyear Archival Collection

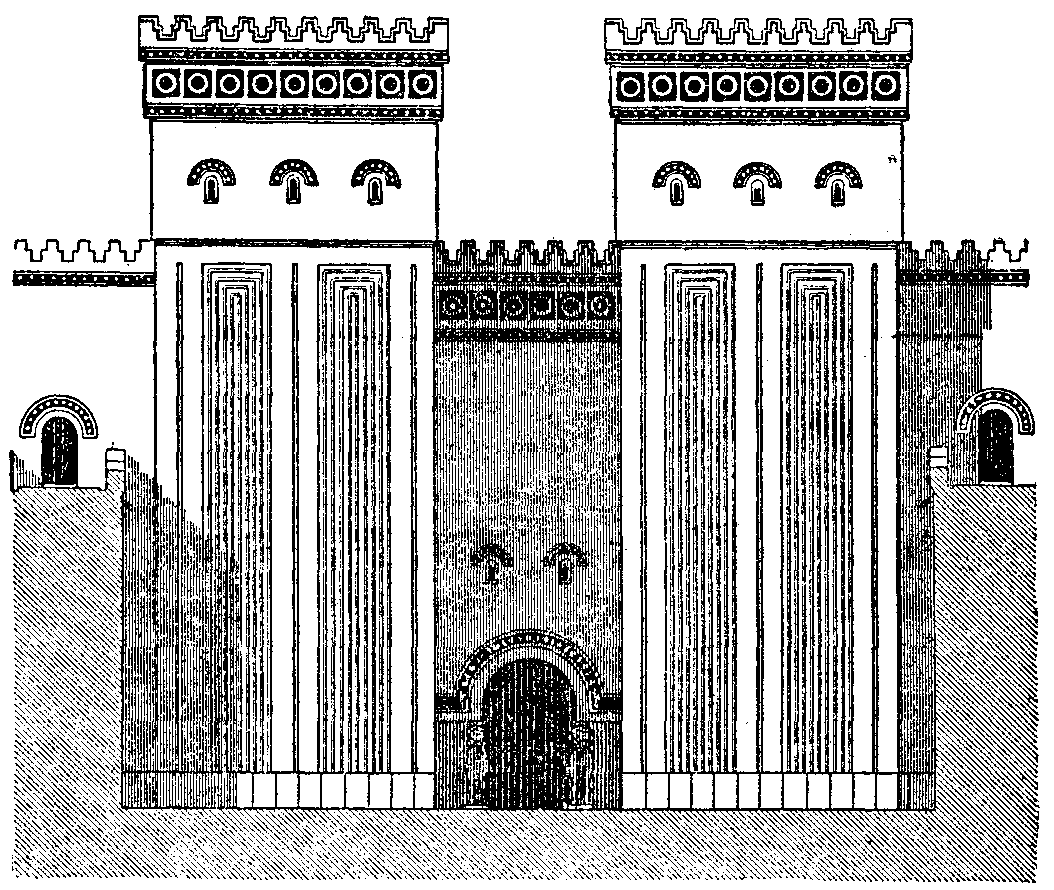
Palace of Dur-Sharrukin

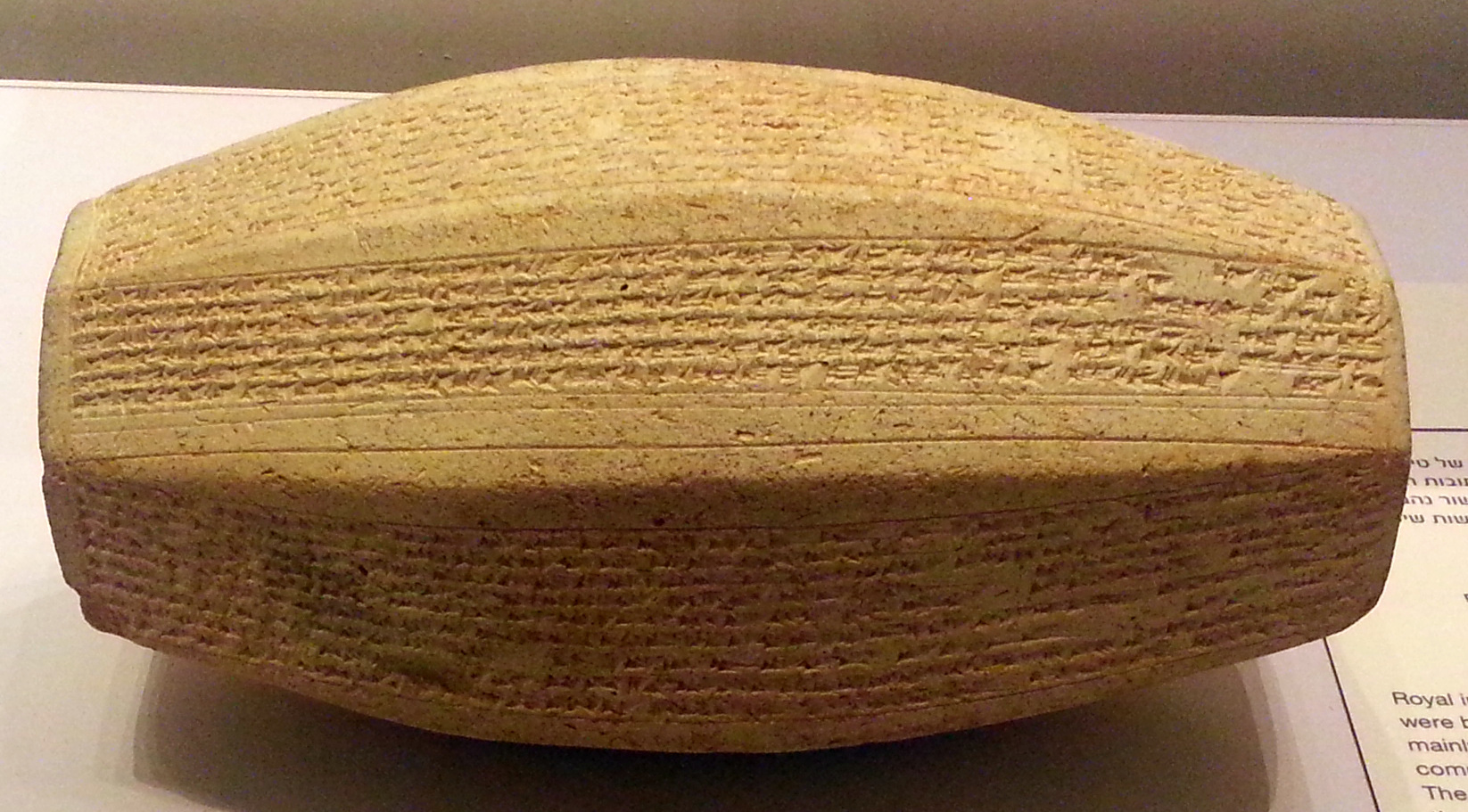
Dur-Sharrukin foundation cylinder

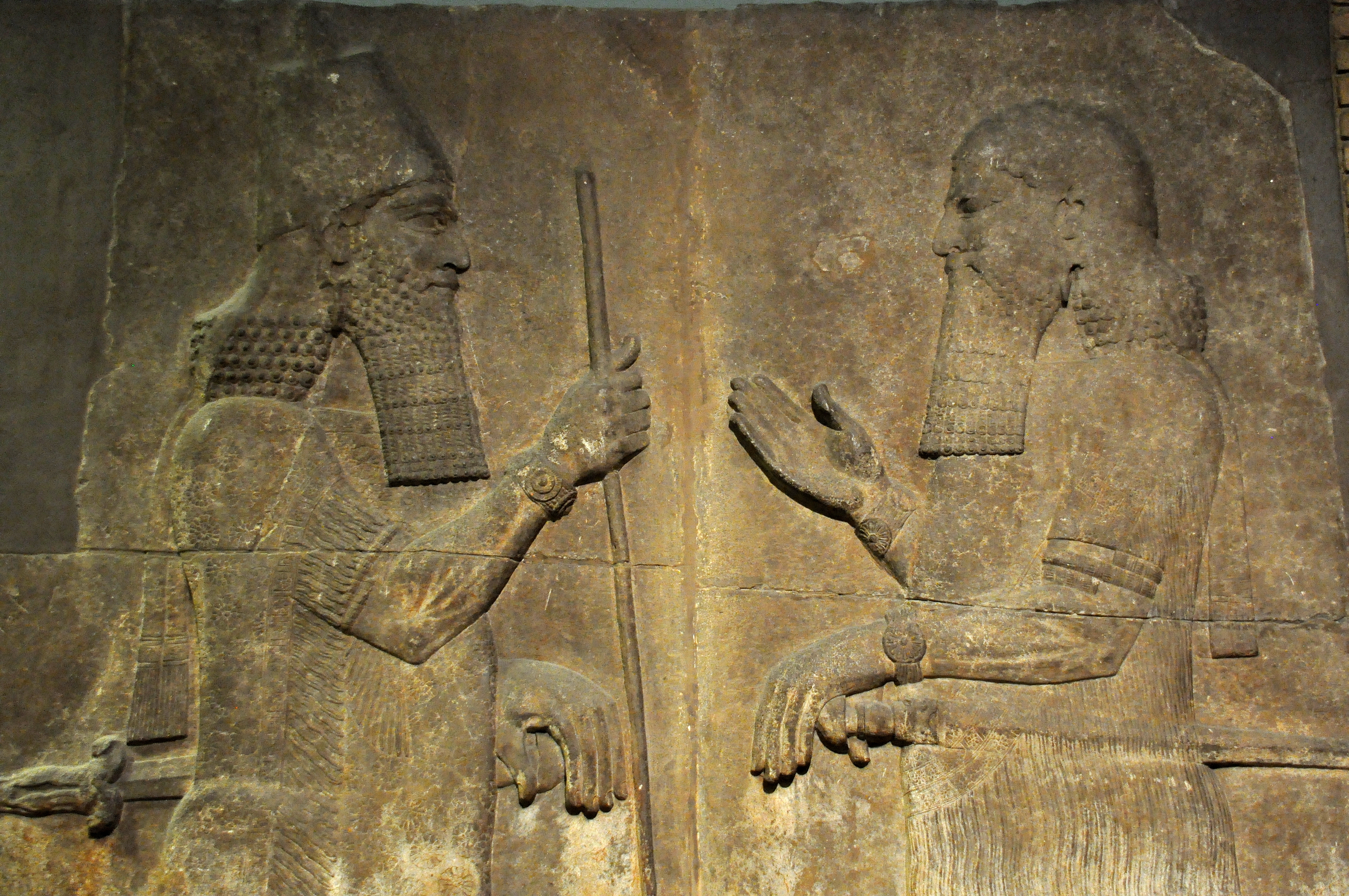
Sargon II (left) faces a high-ranking official, possibly Sennacherib his son and crown prince. 710–705 BCE. From Khorsabad, Iraq. The British Museum, London

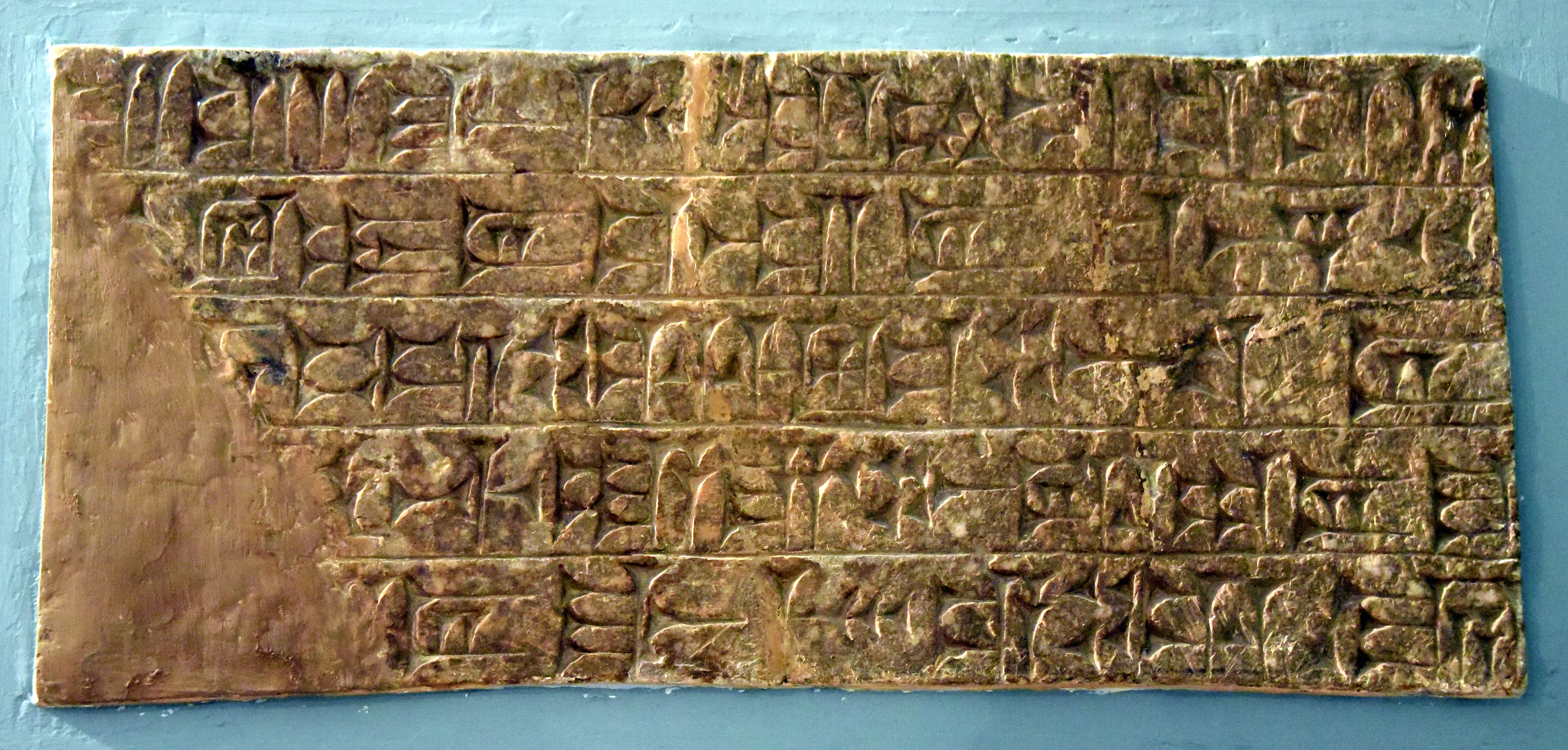
Part of a door-sill from Khorsabad, describing the construction of Sargon II's palace, the British Museum

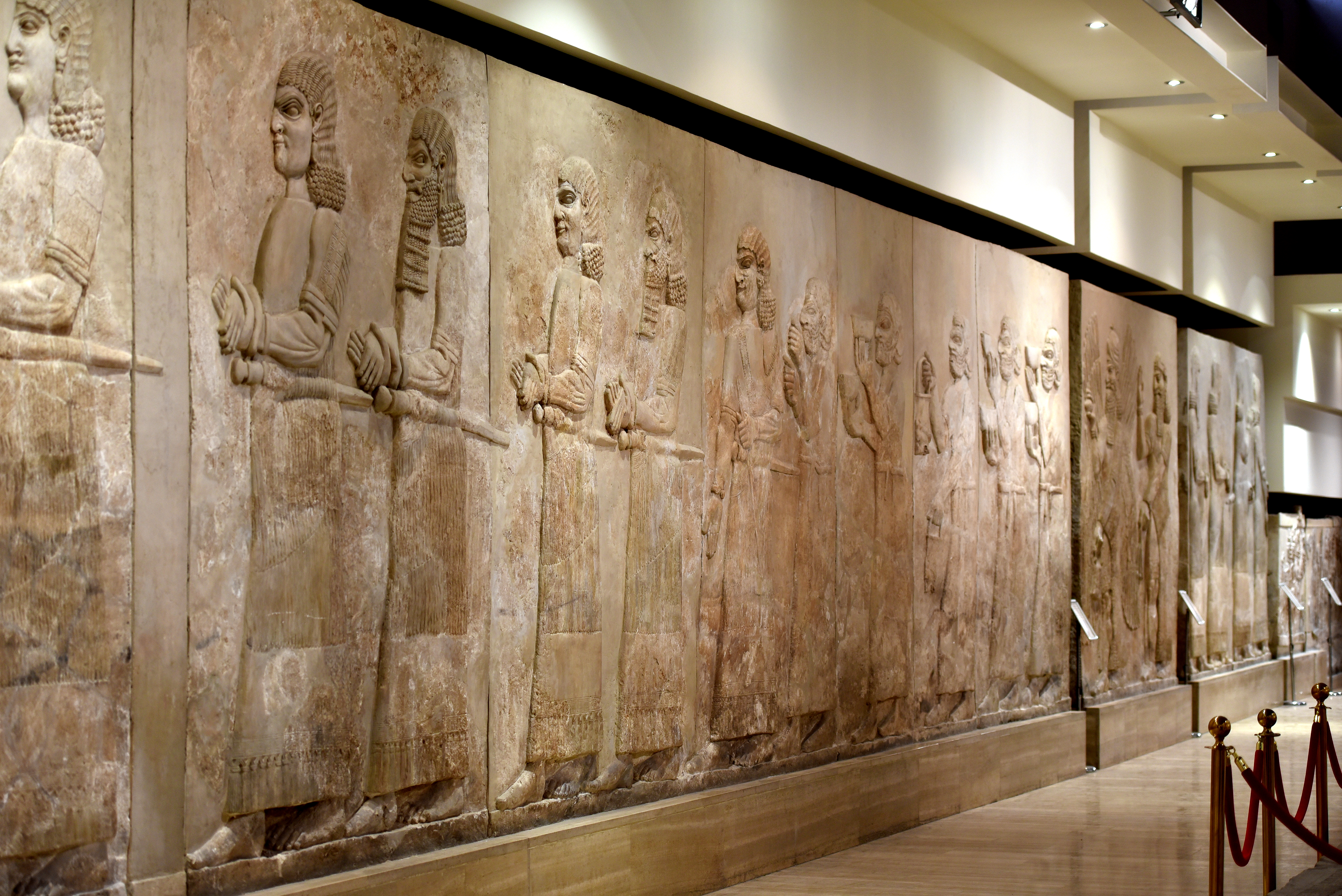
Tributary scene from the Royal Palace at Khorsabad, Iraq. The Iraq Museum

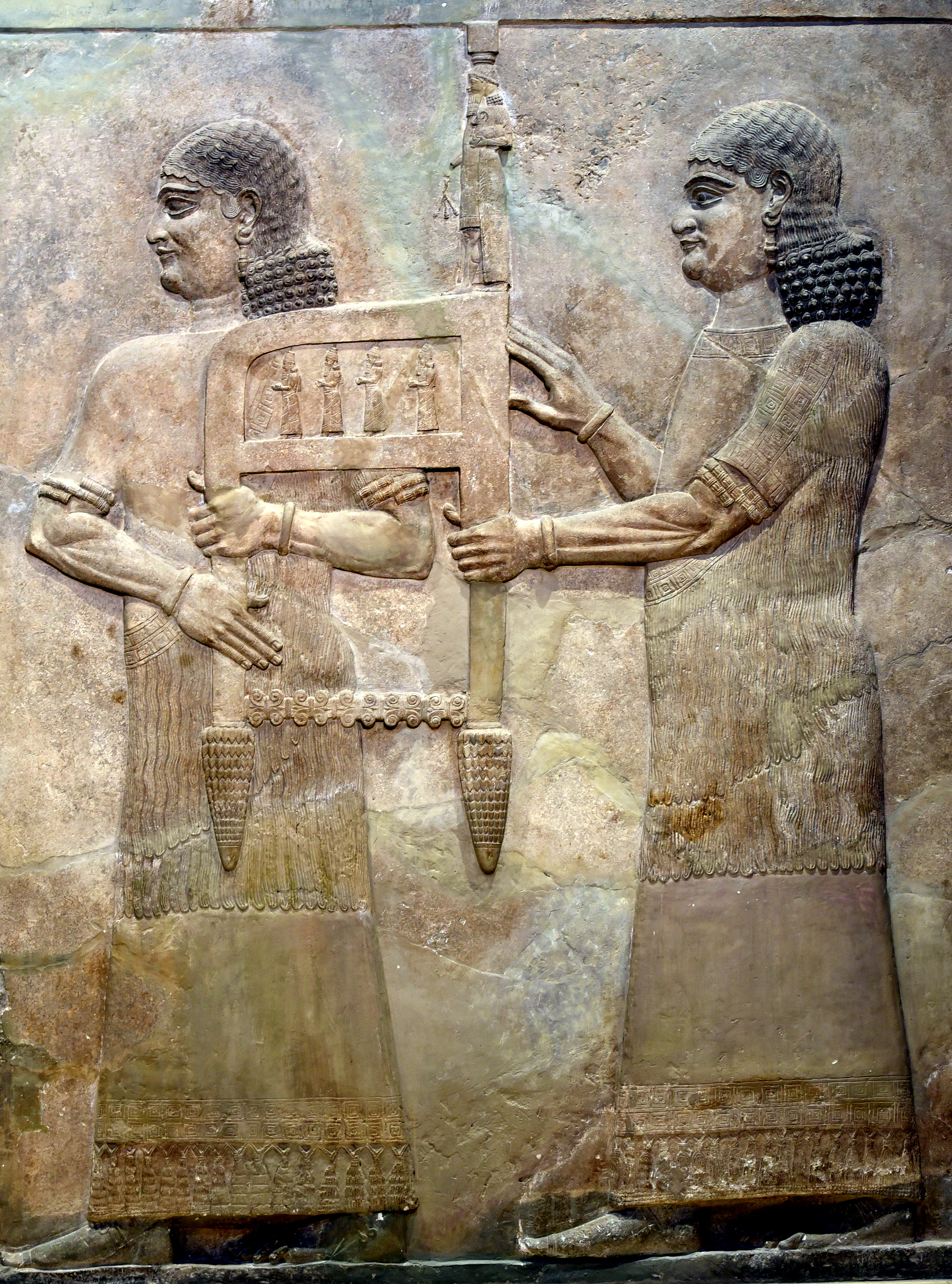
Assyrian attendants carrying the throne of Sargon II, part of a tributary scene from Khorsabad, Iraq. Iraq Museum

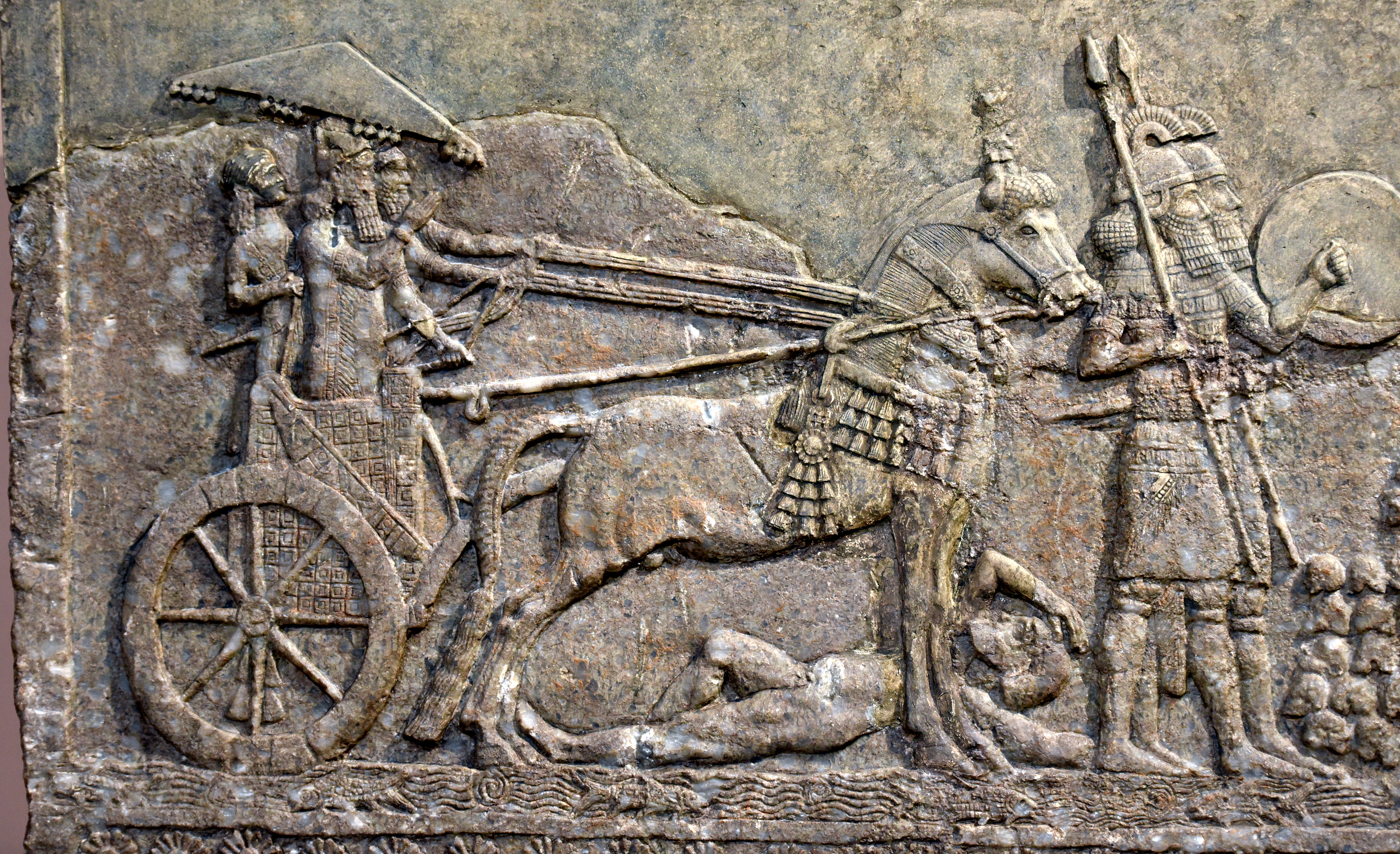
Sargon II in his royal chariot, tramping a dead or dying enemy, part of a war scene from Khorsabad, Iraq. The Iraq Museum

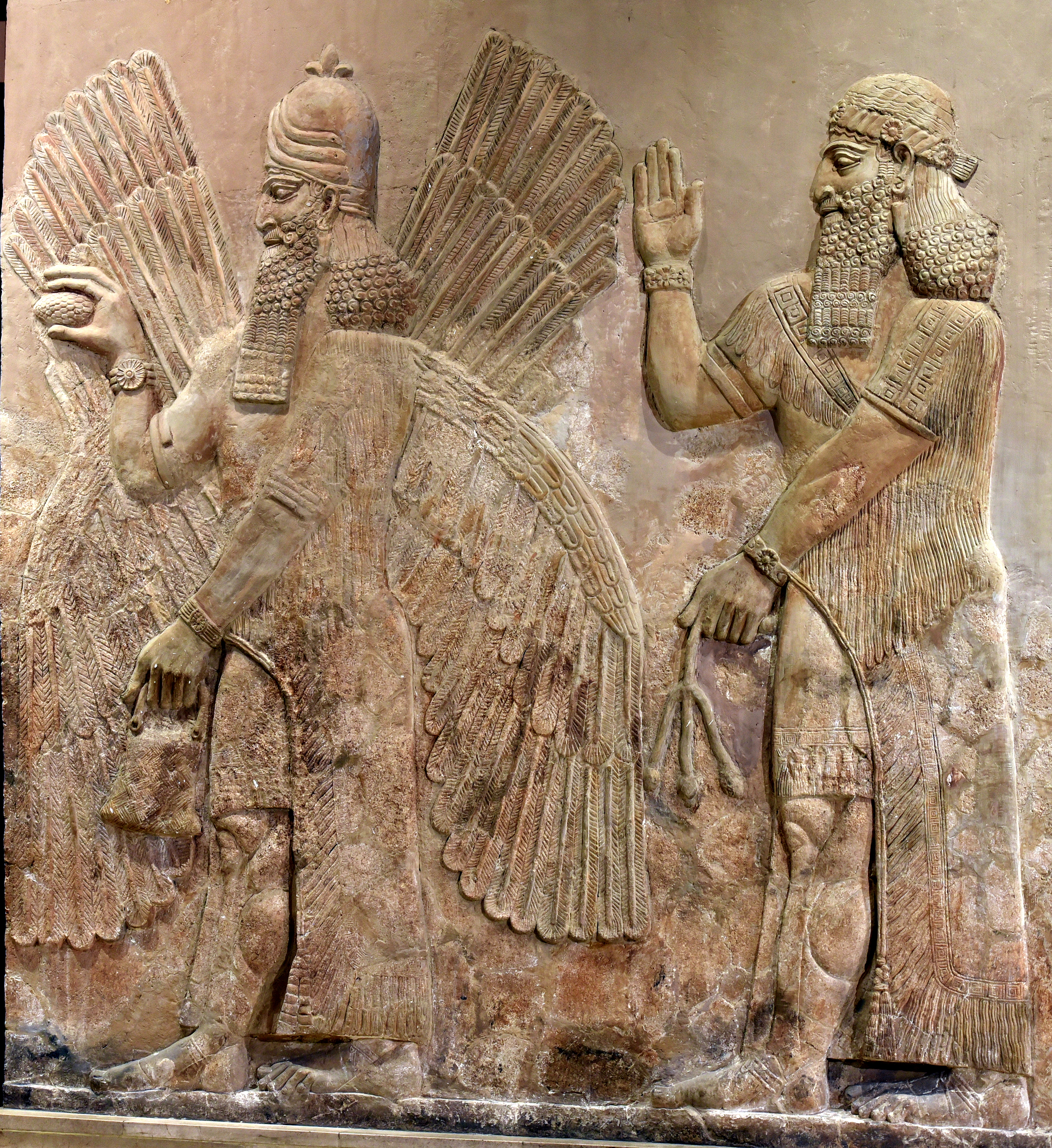
Assyrian human-headed protective spirit from Khorsabad, Iraq. The Iraq Museum

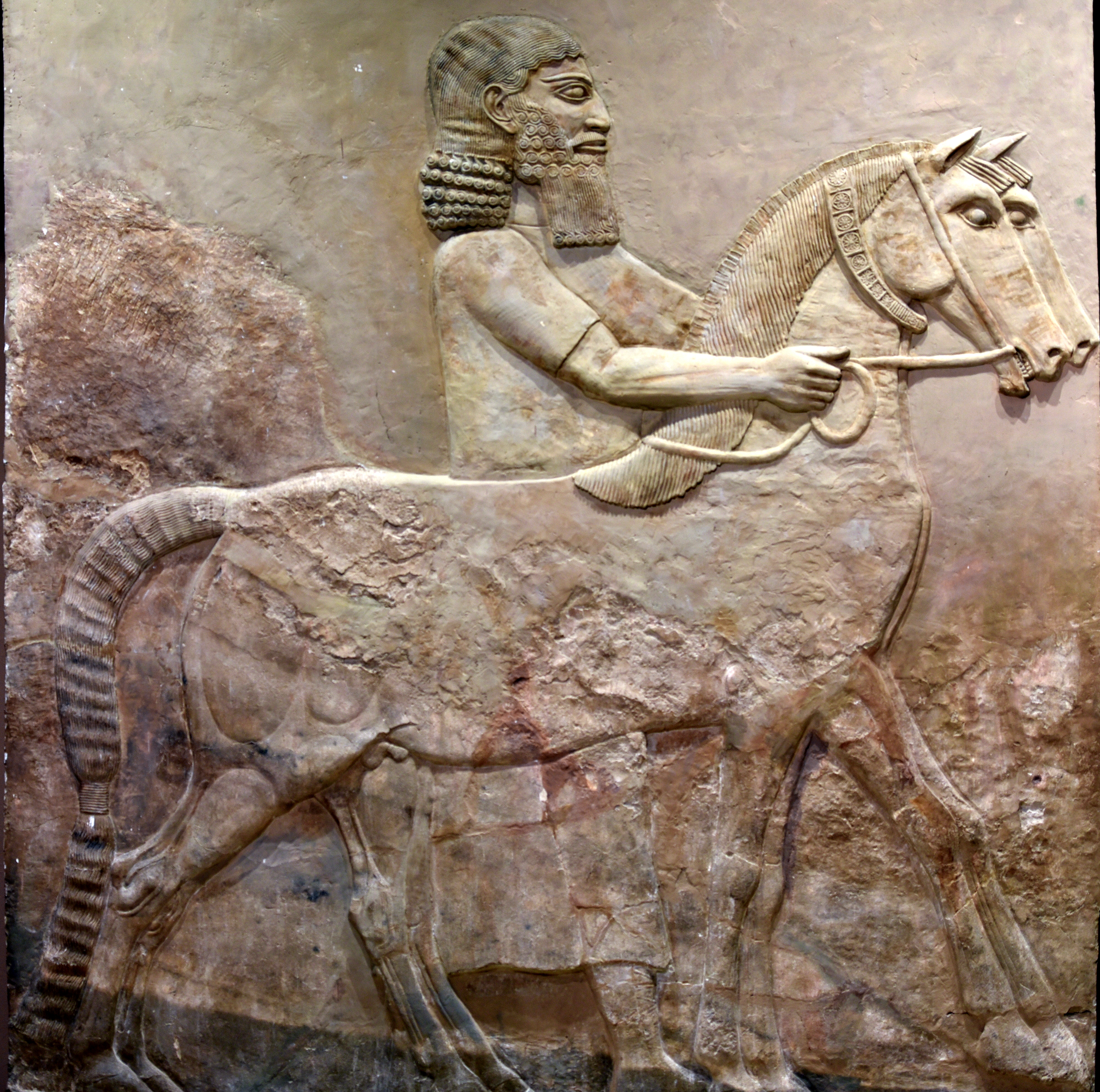
A pair of horses and an Assyrian groom, from Khorsabad, Iraq. Iraq Museum

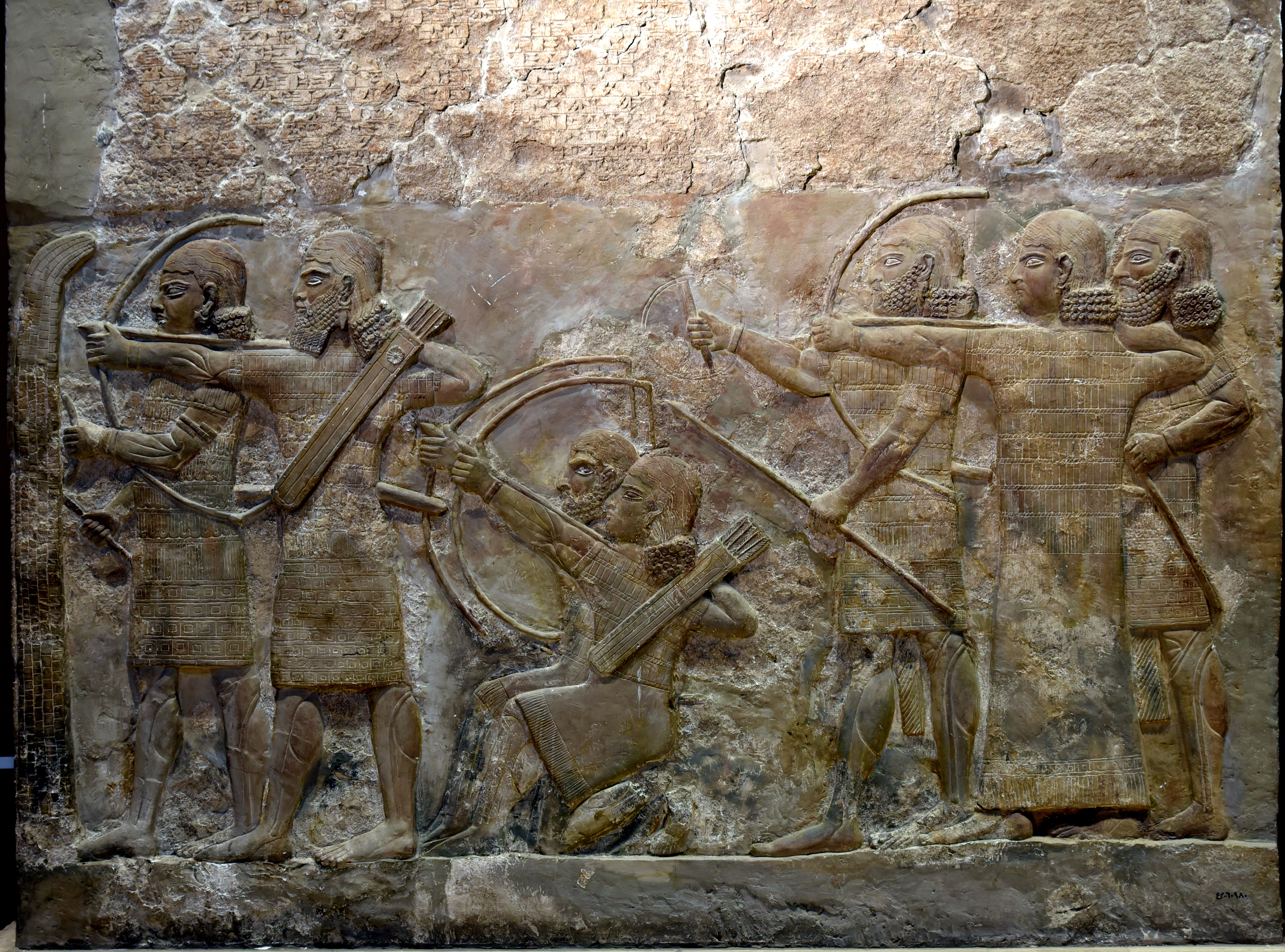
Assyrian archers attacking a city. From Khorsabad, Iraq. The Iraq Museum

1853 excavation of the gate of Sargon's palace

== See also ==
- Cities of the ancient Near East
- Destruction of cultural heritage by ISIL
- Short chronology timeline
- List of megalithic sites
