= Paul-Émile Botta =

French archaeologist

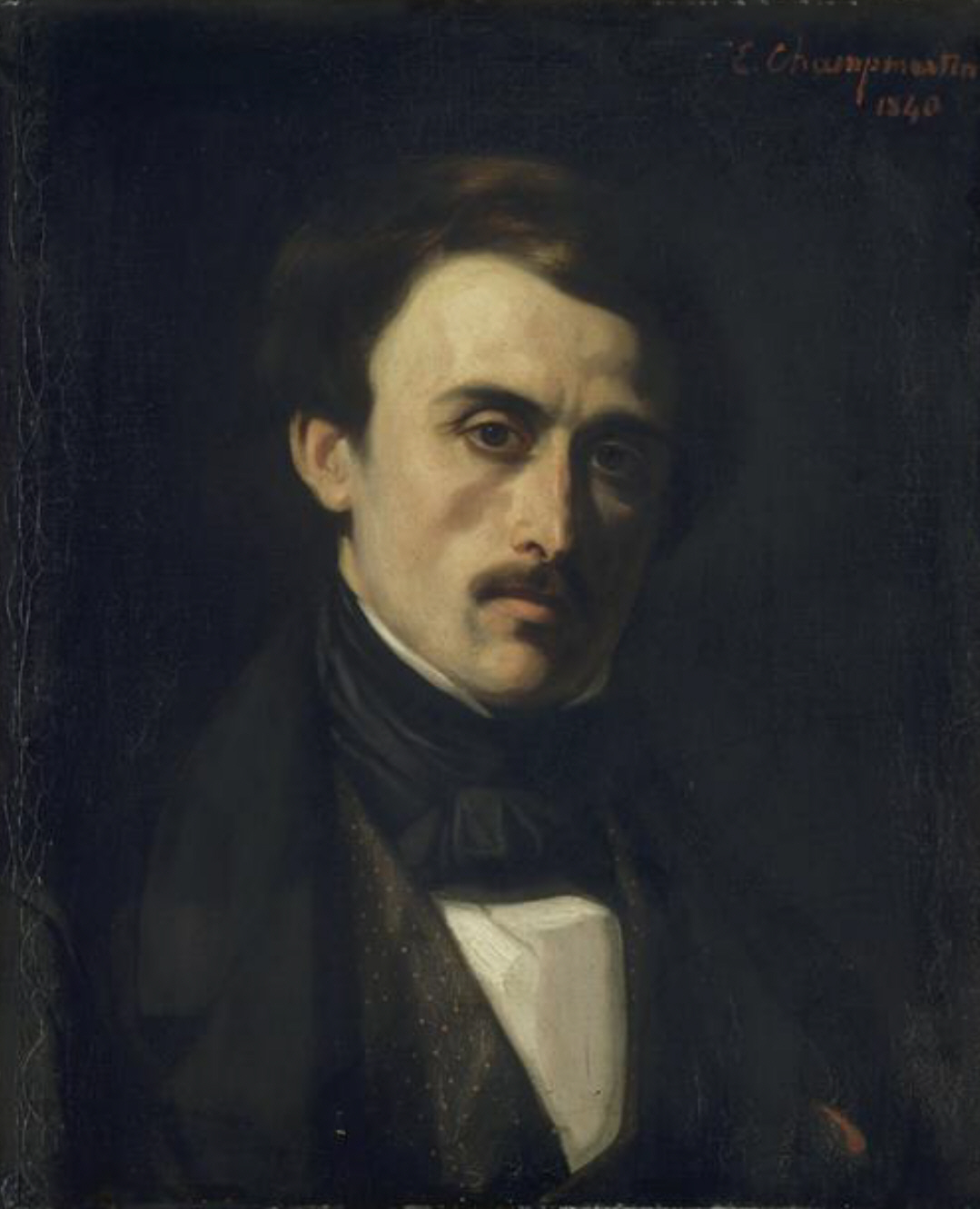
- Born: December 6, 1802; Turin, Italy
- Died: March 29, 1870 (aged 67); Achères
- Scientific career
- Fields: archeology
- Doctoral advisor: Henri Marie Ducrotay de Blainville

Paul-Émile Botta (6 December 1802 – 29 March 1870) was an Italian-born French archeologist who served as Consul in Mosul (then in the Ottoman Empire, now in Iraq) from 1842, and who discovered the ruins of the ancient Assyrian capital of Dur-Sharrukin.

== Life ==
He was born Paolo Emiliano Botta in Turin, Italy, on December 6, 1802. His father was Italian historian Carlo Giuseppe Guglielmo Botta (1766–1837). In 1822 they moved to Paris where he studied under Henri Marie Ducrotay de Blainville.

Botta was selected to be naturalist on a voyage around the world. Although he had no formal medical training, he also served as the ship surgeon. The Heros under Captain Auguste Bernard Duhaut-Cilly (1790–1849) left Le Havre April 8, 1826, and sailed south through the Atlantic Ocean, stopping in Rio de Janeiro and around Cape Horn. They traveled up the coast stopping at Callao, Mexico, and Alta California. Jean Baptiste Rives (1793–1833), the former secretary of the Kingdom of Hawaii, had convinced investors from the family of Jacques Laffitte to finance the voyage to promote trade to California and Hawaii, but Rives disappeared along with some of the cargo. After visiting the Hawaiian Islands they reached China on December 27, 1828. In late July, 1829, the Heros returned to Le Havre.

On January 5, 1830, Botta defended his doctor's thesis. In 1831 he sailed to Cairo, where he met Benjamin Disraeli. Some historians think the French traveler Marigny in Disraeli's novel Contarini Fleming was based on Botta. In 1836 Botta was sent to Yemen to collect plants on behalf of the Paris Natural History Museum.

The French Government appointed Botta as Consul at Mosul in 1842. While there he discovered the ruins of the ancient Assyrian capital of Dur-Sharrukin, and on his return to France in 1845 brought with him many artifacts from it. This achievement earned him a spectacular reputation as an Orientalist.

In 1848 after the French Revolution of 1848, Botta became French consul in Jerusalem, and, after his failed diplomatic mission in Constantinople in 1851, he was consul in Tripoli from 1855 to 1868. Due to his bad health he returned to France. He died on March 29, 1870, in Achères, France.

== Mosul ==
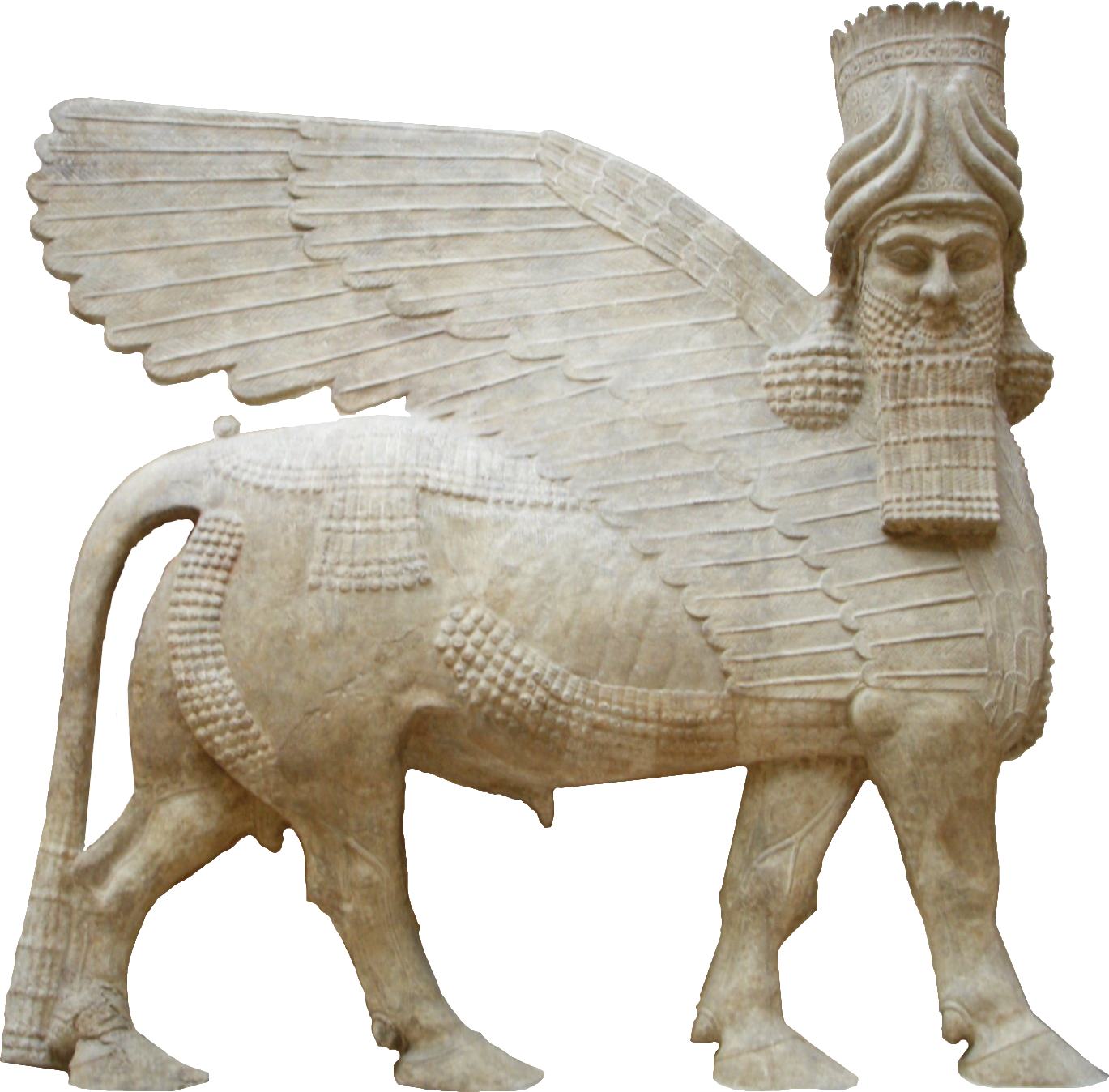
Lamassu. Bas-relief from the m wall, k door, of king Sargon II's palace at Dur-Sharrukin in Assyria (now Khorsabad in Iraq), c. 713–716 BC. (From Botta's excavations in 1843–1844).

Botta was chosen as French Consular Agent in part because of Julius von Mohl's inspiration. Mohl, of the French Asiatic Society, had read Claudius Rich's Memoirs and Narrative, concluding Mosul held possibilities for excavation. Botta's skills as a naturalist, historian, languages and diplomatic service made him an obvious choice to lead such an investigation. Arriving in 1842, Botta first bought antiquities, bricks and clay fragments, and then initially investigating the Nabi Yunus mound before he faced opposition. He then turned his attention on Kuyunjik in December, where he spent a year with only a few inscribed bricks and pieces of alabaster. Then, in March 1843, an Arab described Khorsabad and numerous inscribed bricks to be found there. His workers soon turned up limestone walls with relief sculpture containing Assyrian figures. This was Dur-Sharrukin, or "Sargon's Town", the capital of King Sargon II. Botta sent a dispatch to Mohl stating, "I believe myself to be the first who has discovered sculptures which with some reason can be referred to the period when Nineveh was flourishing." Botta uncovered chambers, halls, and corridors, walls of bas-relief Assyrian scenes and gods, plus doorways flanked by winged bulls with human heads

The French government, highly gratified at the surprising success of its consul, supplied him with ample means for further research as well as the artist Eugène Flandin to document Botta's discoveries. Flandin arrived in May 1844, illustrating alabaster sculptures before they were ruined by the desert heat. Botta continued excavating from 1843 until 1846, and attempted to ship some down the Tigris, the first a failure but the second a success. These were exhibited in the Louvre a few months later. Botta continued excavating until 1846, when nine other archaeologists took over. This group included Austen Layard and Emile Burnouf. Botta published his Ninevah findings in his Monuments de Ninive découverts et décrits par Botta, mesurés et dessinés par Flandin.

The Consulate at Mosul was suppressed by the French Second Republic, and Botta was sent to the Levant.

== Legacy ==
- Botta was also a naturalist. He collected mammals, birds, reptiles, and insects in California in the 1820s and 1830s, as well as in Mesopotamia. The rubber boa (Charina bottae), a Western United States endemic, is named in his honor.
- Botta's pocket gopher described by Joseph Fortuné Théodore Eydoux and Paul Gervais commemorates his name.
- A street in central Jerusalem, where the French General Consulate is presently located, is named in his honor.
