= Babylon =

Ancient Mesopotamian city in Iraq

- Arabic: بابل Bābil; Akkadian: 𒆍𒀭𒊏𒆠Bābilim; Sumerian: 𒆍𒀭𒊏𒆠 KÁ.DIG̃IR.RA^{KI}; Imperial Aramaic: 𐡁𐡁𐡋 Bāḇel; Classical Syriac: ܒܒܠ Bāḇel; Old Persian: 𐎲𐎠𐎲𐎡𐎽𐎢 Bābiru; Ancient Greek: Βαβυλών Babylṓn; Hebrew: בָּבֶל Bāvel; Elamite: 𒀸𒁀𒉿𒇷 Babili; Kassite: Karanduniash, Karduniash; Classical Mandaic: ࡁࡀࡁࡉࡋ
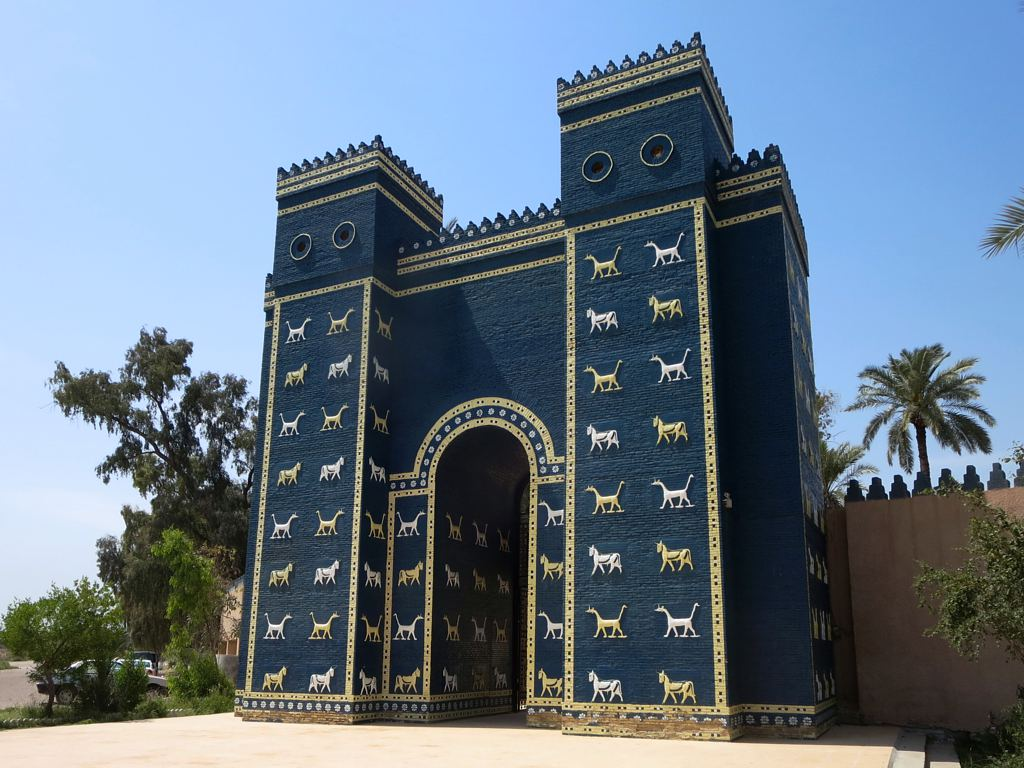
- Replica of the Ishtar Gate

- Location within Iraq Location within Near East
- 32°32′33″N 44°25′16″E
- Type: Settlement
- Cultures: Sumerian, Akkadian, Amorite, Kassite, Assyrian, Chaldean, Achaemenid, Hellenistic, Parthian, Sasanian, Caliphates
- Location: Hillah, Babil Governorate, Iraq
- Region: Mesopotamia
- Part of: Babylonia

History
- Built: c. 2200 BC
- Abandoned: c. 1000 AD

Site notes
- Area: 9 km^{2} (3.5 sq mi)
- Archaeologists: Hormuzd Rassam, Robert Koldewey, Taha Baqir, recent Iraqi Assyriologist
- Condition: Ruined
- Owner: Public

UNESCO World Heritage Site
- Official name: Babylon
- Criteria: Cultural: (iii), (vi)
- Designated: 2019 (43rd session)
- Reference no.: 278
- Region: Arab States

Babylon (/ˈbæbɪlɒn/ BAB-il-on) was an ancient city located on the lower Euphrates river in southern Mesopotamia, within modern-day Hillah, Iraq, about 85 kilometres (53 miles) south of modern-day Baghdad. Babylon functioned as the main cultural and political centre of the Akkadian-speaking region of Babylonia. Its rulers established two important empires in antiquity, the 19th–16th century BC Old Babylonian Empire, and the 7th–6th century BC Neo-Babylonian Empire. Babylon also served as a regional capital of other empires, such as the Achaemenid Empire. Babylon was one of the most important urban centres of the ancient Near East until its decline during the Hellenistic period. Nearby ancient sites include Kish, Borsippa, Dilbat, and Kutha.

Both the Hanging Gardens and Walls of Babylon were ranked among the Seven Wonders of the Ancient World. The gardens purportedly existed between approximately 600 BC and AD 1, but some scholars question their historical reality, as they are not mentioned in any extant Babylonian text.

The earliest known mention of Babylon as a small town appears on a clay tablet from the reign of Shar-Kali-Sharri (2217–2193 BC), of the Akkadian Empire. Babylon was a religious and cultural centre at this point but was neither an independent state nor a large city, merely a town of the Akkadian Empire. The collapse of the Akkadian Empire was followed by a few decades under the south Mesopotamian Gutian Dynasty, then the Third Dynasty of Ur ruling the whole of Mesopotamia, including the town of Babylon.

The town became part of a small independent city-state in the early second millennium BC. The Amorite king Hammurabi founded the Old Babylonian Empire in the 18th century BC. He built Babylon into a major city and declared himself its king. Southern Mesopotamia became known as Babylonia, and Babylon eclipsed Nippur as the region's holy city. The empire waned under Hammurabi's son Samsu-iluna, and Babylon spent long periods under Assyrian, Kassite and Elamite domination. After the Assyrians destroyed and then rebuilt it, Babylon became the capital of the short-lived Neo-Babylonian Empire, from 626 to 539 BC. After the fall of the Neo-Babylonian Empire, the city came under the rule of the Achaemenid, Seleucid, Parthian, Roman, Sassanid, and Muslim empires. The last known habitation of the town dates from the 11th century AD, when it was referred to as the "small village of Babel".

It has been estimated that Babylon was the largest city in the world c. 1770 – c. 1670 BC, and again c. 612 – c. 320 BC. It was perhaps the first city to reach a population above 200,000 in an area of about 900 ha (3.5 sq mi). The main sources of information about Babylon—excavation of the site itself, references in cuneiform texts found elsewhere in Mesopotamia, references in the Bible, descriptions in Herodotus and other classical authors, and second-hand summaries of the work of Ctesias and Berossus—present an incomplete and sometimes contradictory picture of the ancient city, even at its peak in the sixth century BC.

UNESCO recognized Babylon as a World Heritage Site in 2019. The site receives thousands of visitors each year, almost all of them Iraqis. Local construction is rapidly increasing, threatening to encroach upon the ruins.

== Names ==
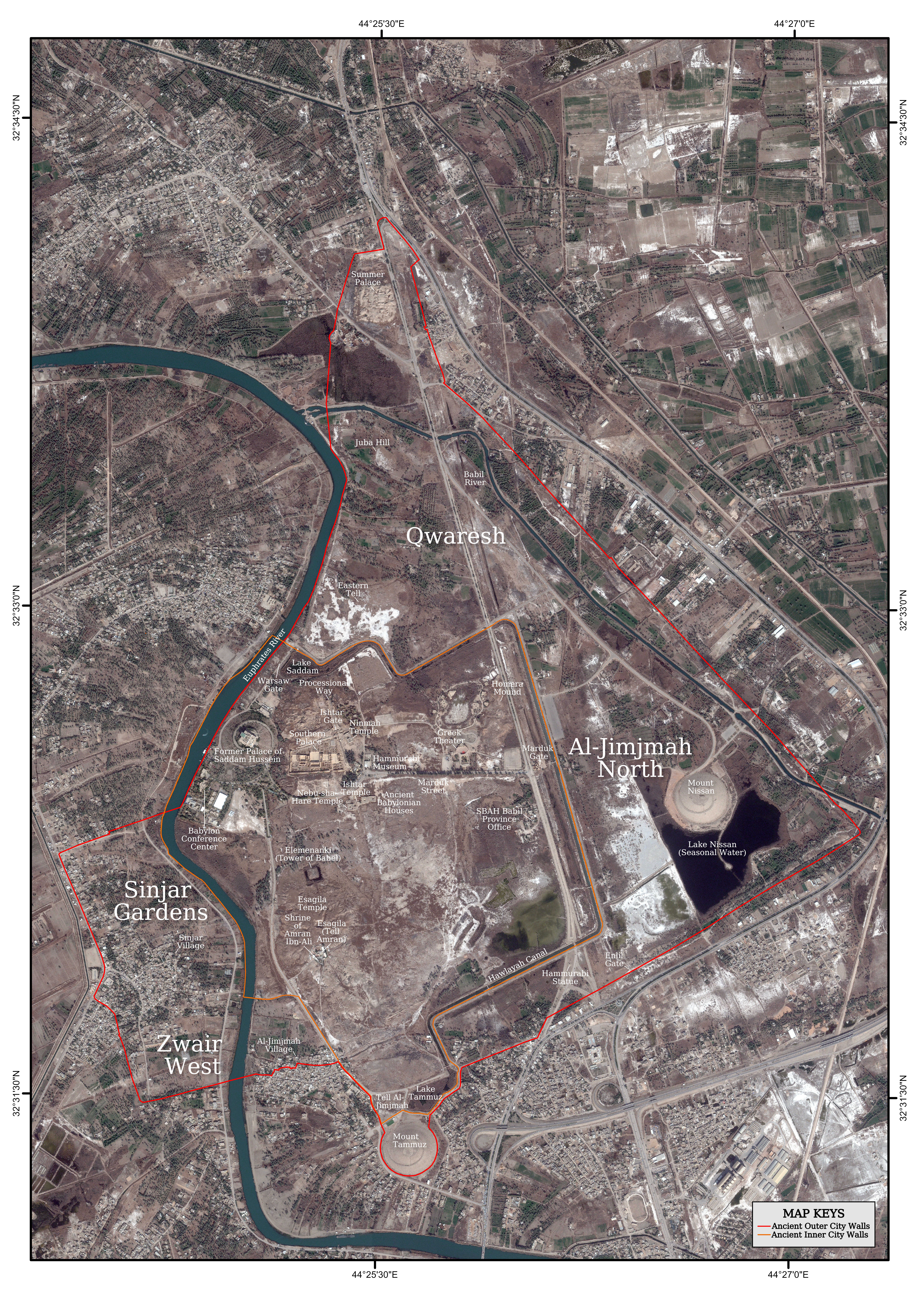
A map of Babylon, with major areas and modern-day villages

The spelling Babylon is the Latin representation of Koine Greek Babylṓn (Βαβυλών), derived from the native Akkadian: 𒆍𒀭𒊏𒆠, romanized: Bābilim, lit. 'gate of the god(s)'. The cuneiform spelling is KÁ.DIG̃IR.RA^{KI}, corresponding to the Sumerian phrase Kan dig̃irak. The sign 𒆍 (KÁ) is the logogram for "gate", 𒀭 (DIG̃IR) means "god", and 𒊏 (RA) represents the coda of the word dig̃ir (-r) followed by the genitive suffix -ak. The final 𒆠 (^{KI}) is a determinative indicating that the previous signs are to be understood as a place name.

Archibald Sayce, writing in the 1870s, postulated that the Semitic name was a loan-translation of the original Sumerian name. However, the "gate of god" interpretation is increasingly viewed as a Semitic folk etymology to explain an unknown original non-Semitic placename. I. J. Gelb in 1955 argued that the original name was Babilla, of unknown meaning and origin, as there were other similarly named places in Sumer, and there are no other examples of Sumerian place-names being replaced with Akkadian translations. He deduced that it later transformed into Akkadian Bāb-ili(m), and that the Sumerian name Kan-dig̃irak was a loan translation of the Semitic folk etymology rather than the original name. The retranslation of the Semitic name into Sumerian would have taken place at the time of the "Neo-Sumerian" Third Dynasty of Ur (Bab-Il).

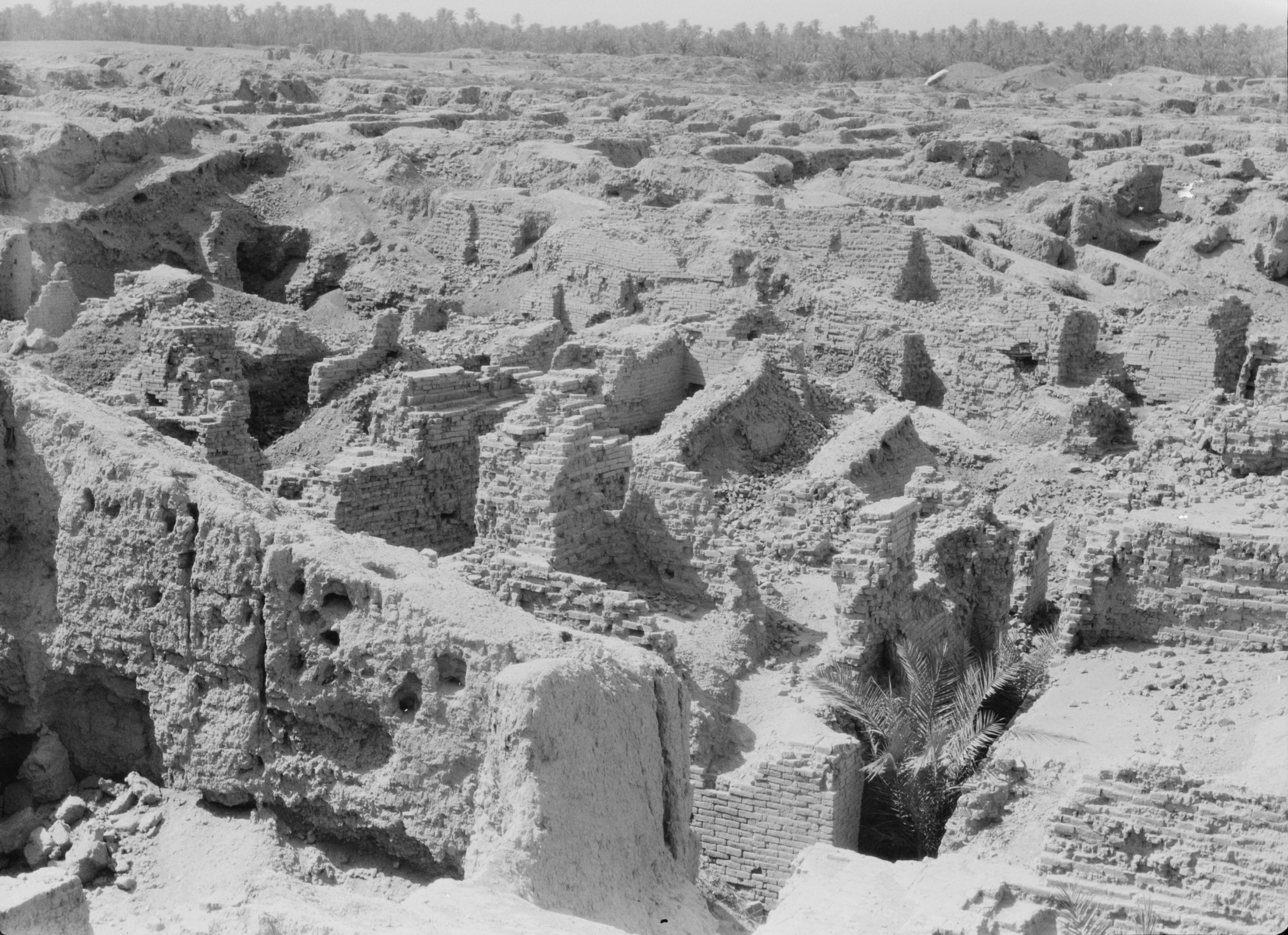
Babylon in 1932

A fragmentary limestone votive inscription dated by paleography to the Early Dynastic II period (c. 2700 BC) was suggested to include the name of Babylon. It read "en_{5}-[si] BAR.KI.BAR dumu a-hu-ì-lum ̆lu-ì-lum-be-l[í] lú-ur-kù-bí dím é ^{d}amar-utu mu-gub-am_{6}". Proposed as being in the Akkadian language though earlier than that language is attested, it refers to an unknown lord who was the governor (ENSI) of BAR.KI.BAR who constructed a temple for (possibly) Marduk, suggesting that the city might be Babylon. During the ED III period, sign placement was relatively fluid and so the KI sign could be seen as the determinative, with the name of the city as BAR.BAR, perhaps pronounced Babbar. Paul-Alain Beaulieu proposes that the original name could mean "shining", "glowing", or "white". It would be likely that it was later read as Babbir, and then Babbil by swapping the consonant r with l. The attribution to Marduk and to Babylon is considered doubtful.

The earliest reasonably firm mention of the city of Babylon comes from one of Shar-Kali-Sharri's year names, which reports the founding of temples of Annunitum and Ilaba in KÁ.DINGIR^{ki}, thought to be Babylon, indicating that the folk etymology was already widely known in the Akkadian Empire (c. 2334–2193 BC) period. However, the original form of the name (Babbar/Babbir) was not forgotten, as seen from the phonetic spelling ba-ab-bí-lum in the Ur III period, and the spellings Pambalu and Babalu in the Kassite period.

Another attested spelling for the city of Babylon is TIN.TIR.KI, attested sparsely in the Old Babylonian period, known mostly from later Neo-Babylonian copies, and was in widespread usage in the 1st Millennium BC. The spelling E.KI also appears in the 1st Millennium BC.

In the Hebrew Bible, the name appears as Babel (Hebrew: בָּבֶל, romanized: Bāḇel; Classical Syriac: ܒܒܠ, romanized: Bāḇēl, Imperial Aramaic: בבל Bāḇel; in Arabic: بَابِل Bābil), interpreted in Genesis 11:9 to mean "confusion", from the verb bilbél (בלבל, "to confuse"). The modern English verb, to babble ("to speak foolish, excited, or confusing talk"), is popularly thought to derive from this name, but there is no direct connection.

In some instances, ancient records use "Babylon" as a name for other cities, including Borsippa within Babylon's sphere of influence, and Nineveh for a brief period after the Assyrian sack of Babylon.

== Archaeology ==
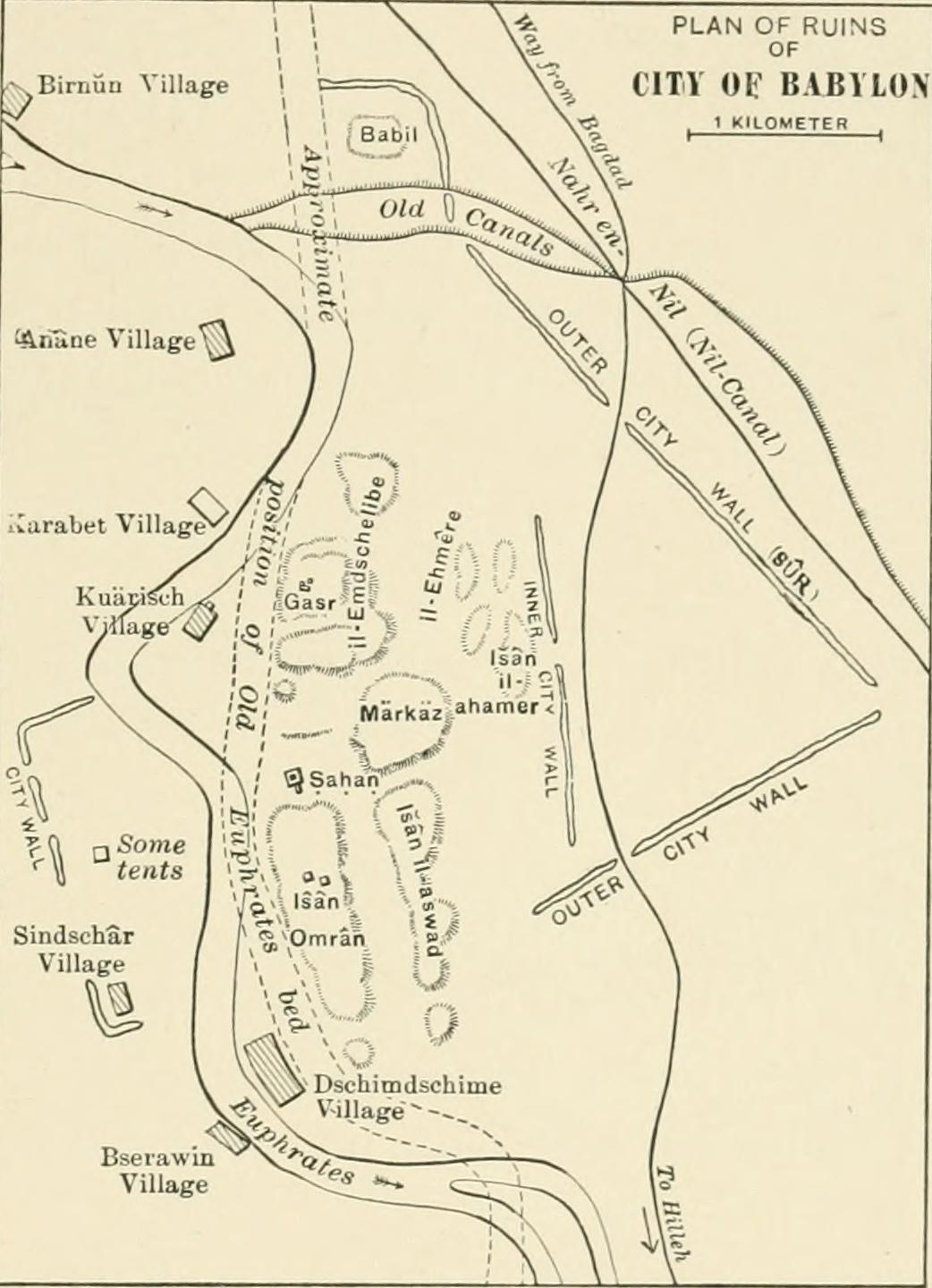
A map of ruins in 1905, with locations and names of villages

From the accounts of modern travellers, I had expected to have found on the site of Babylon more, and less, than I actually did. Less, because I could have formed no conception of the prodigious extent of the whole ruins, or of the size, solidity, and perfect state, of some of the parts of them; and more, because I thought that I should have distinguished some traces, however imperfect, of many of the principal structures of Babylon. I imagined, I should have said: "Here were the walls, and such must have been the extent of the area. There stood the palace, and this most assuredly was the tower of Belus." – I was completely deceived: instead of a few insulated mounds, I found the whole face of the country covered with vestiges of building, in some places consisting of brick walls surprisingly fresh, in others merely of a vast succession of mounds of rubbish of such indeterminate figures, variety and extent, as to involve the person who should have formed any theory in inextricable confusion.

— Claudius J. Rich, Memoir on the Ruins of Babylon (1815), pp. 1–2.

The site covers an area of about 1,000 hectares (3 3/4 mi^{2}), with about 450 hectares (1 3/4 mi^{2}) within the several kilometer (mile) long city walls, containing a number of mounds, the most prominent of which are Kasr, Merkes (13 meters; 43 ft above the plain), Homera, Ishin-Aswad, Sahn, Amran, and Babil. It is roughly bisected by the Shatt Al-Hillah, a branch of the Euphrates river, which has shifted slightly since ancient times. The local water table has risen, making excavation of lower levels difficult. Prior to the heavy use of baked bricks in the reign of Neo-Babylonian ruler Nebuchadnezzar II (605–562 BC), construction at Babylon was primarily of unbaked brick, with the occasional use of baked bricks or bitumen.

- Kasr – also called Palace or Castle, it was the location of the Neo-Babylonian ziggurat Etemenanki of Nebuchadnezzar II. It lies in the center of the site and rises to 19 meters (62 ft) above the plain.
- Amran Ibn Ali – about 22 meters (72 ft) high and at the south of the site. It is the site of Esagila, a temple of Marduk that also contained shrines to Ea and Nabu.
- Homera – a reddish-colored mound on the west side. Most of the Hellenistic remains are here. Most of the remains of the ziggurat Etemenanki were heaped here when it was demolished by Alexander the Great in 331 BC.
- Babil – a mound about 25 meters (82 ft) high at the northern end of the site. Its bricks have been subject to looting since ancient times. It held a palace built by Nebuchadnezzar.

Subsequent excavation, looting, and reconstruction have reduced these original heights found by the German excavators.

=== Excavations ===
Claudius Rich, working for the British East India Company in Baghdad, excavated Babylon in 1811–12 and again in 1817. Captain Robert Mignan explored the site briefly in 1827. In 1829, he completed a map of Babylon which includes the location of several villages. William Loftus visited there in 1849. Austen Henry Layard made some soundings during a brief visit in 1850 before abandoning the site.

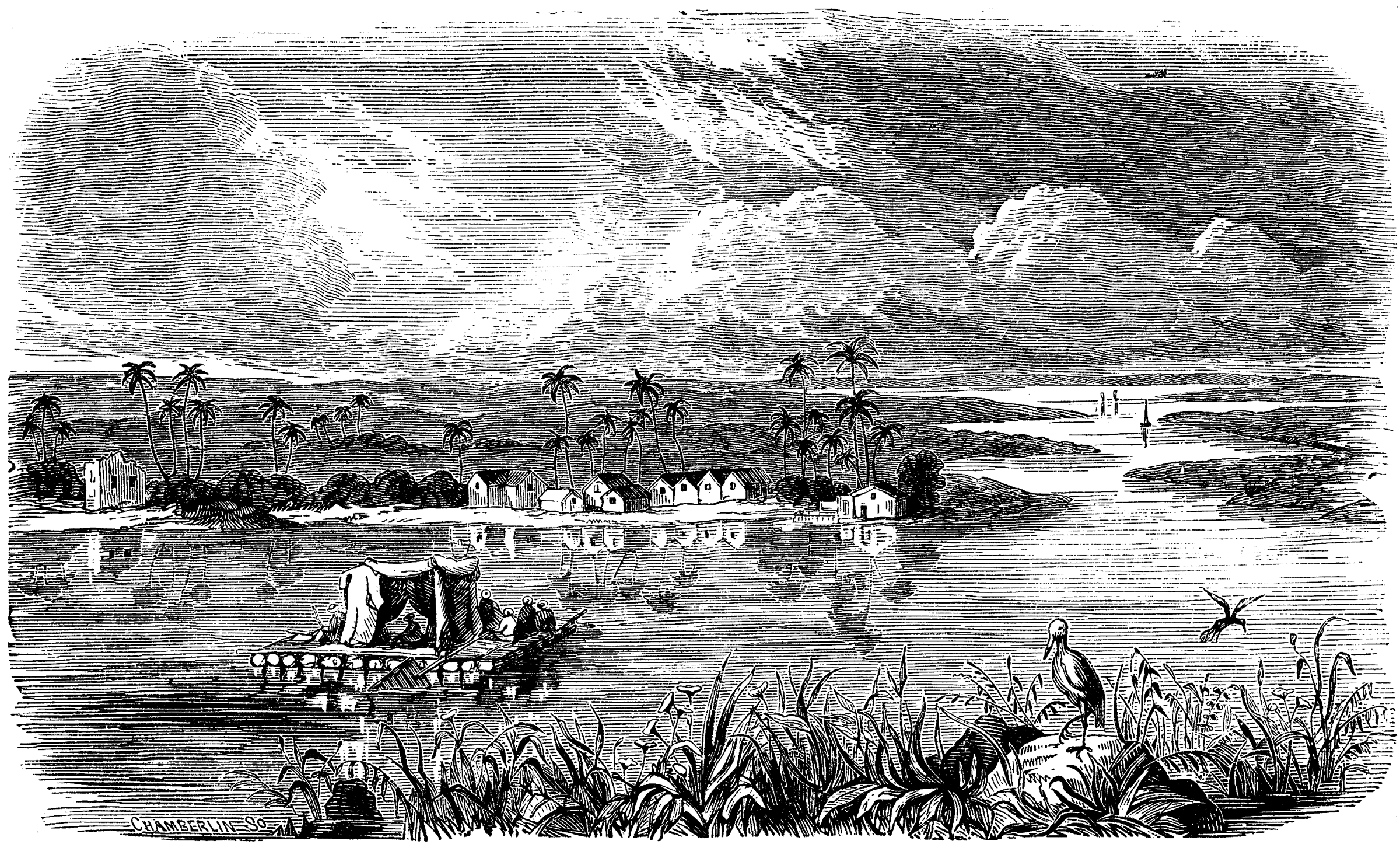
The location of the Qurnah Disaster, where hundreds of cases of antiquities from Fresnel's mission were lost in 1855

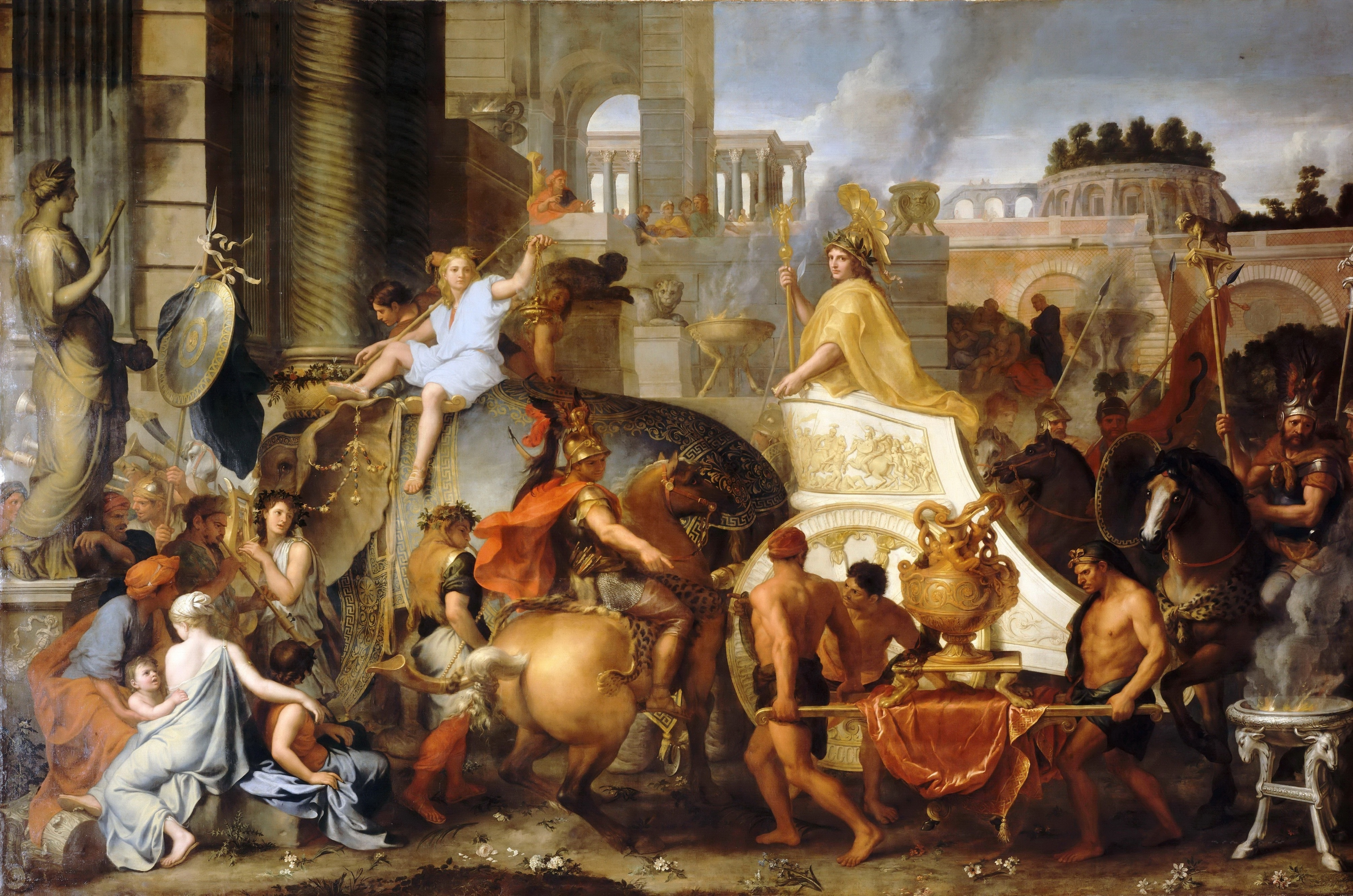
"Entry of Alexander into Babylon", a 1665 painting by Charles LeBrun, depicts Alexander the Great's uncontested entry into the city of Babylon, envisioned with pre-existing Hellenistic architecture.

Fulgence Fresnel, Julius Oppert and Felix Thomas heavily excavated Babylon from 1852 to 1854. Much of their work was lost in the Qurnah Disaster, when a transport ship and four rafts sank on the Tigris river in May 1855. They had been carrying over 200 crates of artifacts from various excavation missions, when they were attacked by Tigris river pirates near Al-Qurnah. Recovery efforts, assisted by the Ottoman authorities and British Residence in Baghdad, loaded the equivalent of 80 crates on a ship for Le Havre in May 1856. Few antiquities from the Fresnel mission made it to France. Subsequent efforts to recover the lost antiquities from the Tigris, including a Japanese expedition in 1971–72, have been largely unsuccessful.

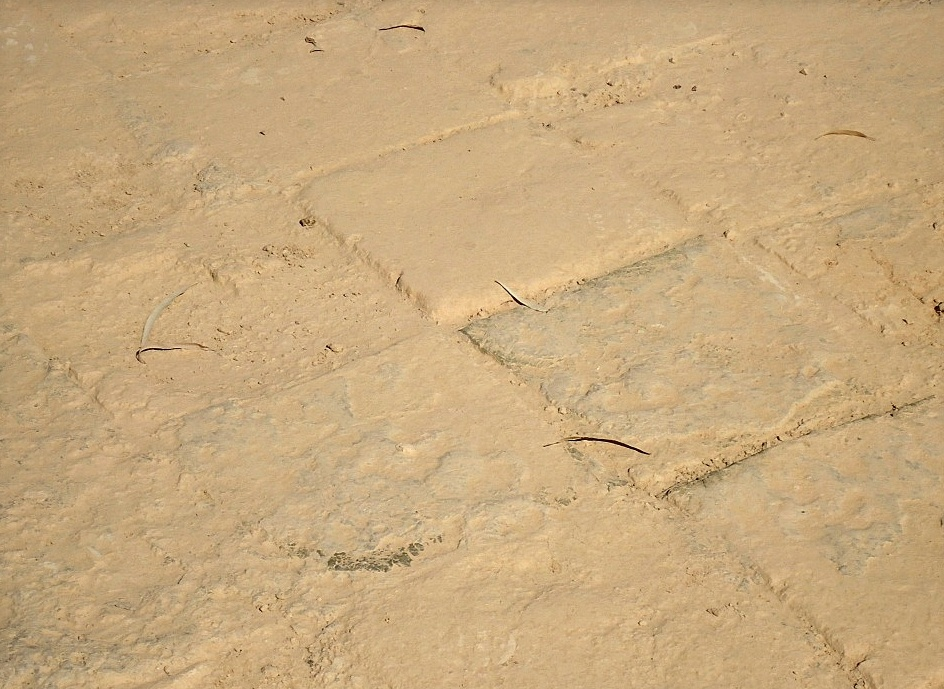
Original tiles of the processional street. Ancient Babylon, Mesopotamia, Iraq.

Henry Rawlinson and George Smith worked there briefly in 1854. The next excavation was conducted by Hormuzd Rassam on behalf of the British Museum. Work began in 1879, continuing until 1882, and was prompted by widespread looting of the site. Using industrial scale digging in search of artifacts, Rassam recovered a large quantity of cuneiform tablets and other finds. The zealous excavation methods, common at the time, caused significant damage to the archaeological context. Many tablets had appeared on the market in 1876 before Rassam's excavation began.

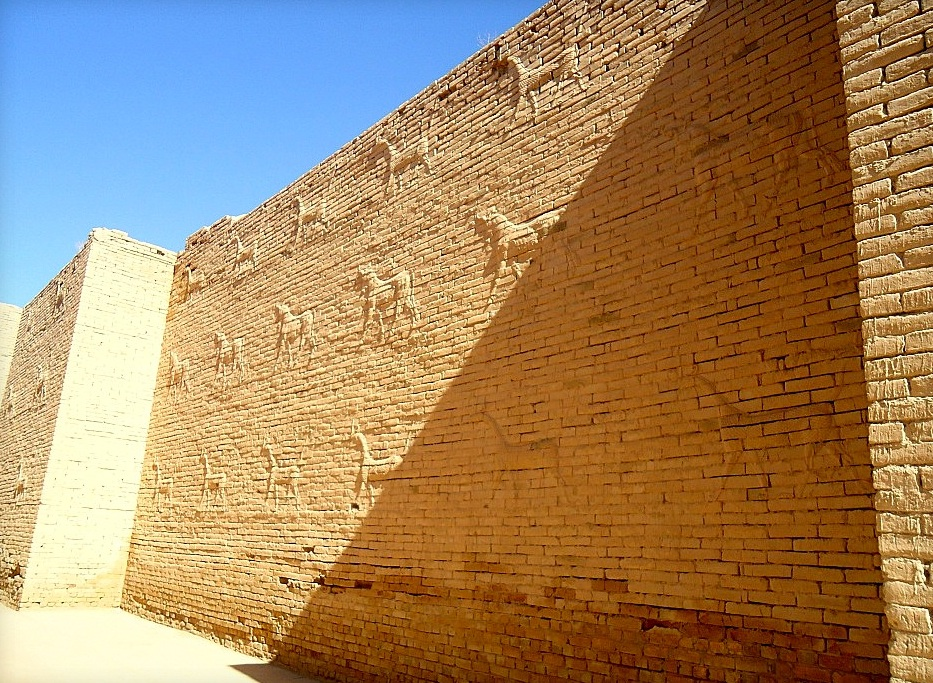
Mušḫuššu (sirrush) and aurochs on either side of the processional street. Ancient Babylon, Mesopotamia, Iraq.

A team from the German Oriental Society led by Robert Koldewey conducted the first scientific archaeological excavations at Babylon. The work was conducted daily from 1899 until 1917. A major problem for Koldewey was the large scale mining of baked bricks, which began in the 19th century and which were mainly sourced from the time of Nebuchadnezzar II. At the time, excavations for brick mining, for various building projects, including the Hindiya dam were under way. The primary efforts of the dig involved the temple of Marduk and the processional way leading up to it, as well as the city wall.

Artifacts, including pieces of the Ishtar Gate and hundreds of recovered tablets, were sent back to Germany, where Koldewey's colleague Walter Andrae reconstructed them into displays at the Vorderasiatisches Museum Berlin. The Koldewey expedition recovered artifacts from the Old Babylonian period. These included 967 clay tablets, with 564 tablets from the Middle Babylonian period, stored in private houses, with Sumerian literature and lexical documents. The German archaeologists fled before oncoming British troops in 1917, and again, many objects went missing in the following years.

Further work by the German Archaeological Institute was conducted by Heinrich J. Lenzen in 1956 and Hansjörg Schmid in 1962, working the Hellenistic, Parthian, Sasanian, and Arabic levels of the site. Lenzen's work dealt primarily with the Hellenistic theatre, and Schmid focused on the temple ziggurat Etemenanki.

A topographical survey at the site was conducted in 1974, followed in 1977 by a review of the stratigraphical position of the main monuments and reconsideration of ancient water levels, by the Turin Centre for Archaeological Research and Excavations in the Middle East and Asia, and the Iraqi-Italian Institute of Archaeological Sciences. The focus was on clearing up issues raised by re-examination of the old German data. Additional work in 1987–1989 concentrated on the area surrounding the Ishara and Ninurta temples in the Shu-Anna city-quarter of Babylon.

A number of Iraqi excavations have occurred at Babylon, the earliest in 1938. From 1979 to 1981 excavation and restoration work was conducted at the Ninmah Temple, Istar Temple, and the Southern Palace. Occasional excavations and restorations continued in the 1970s and 1980s.

During the restoration efforts in Babylon, the Iraqi State Organization for Antiquities and Heritage conducted extensive research, excavation and clearing, but wider publication of these archaeological activities has been limited. Most of the known tablets from all modern excavations remain unpublished.

== Sources ==
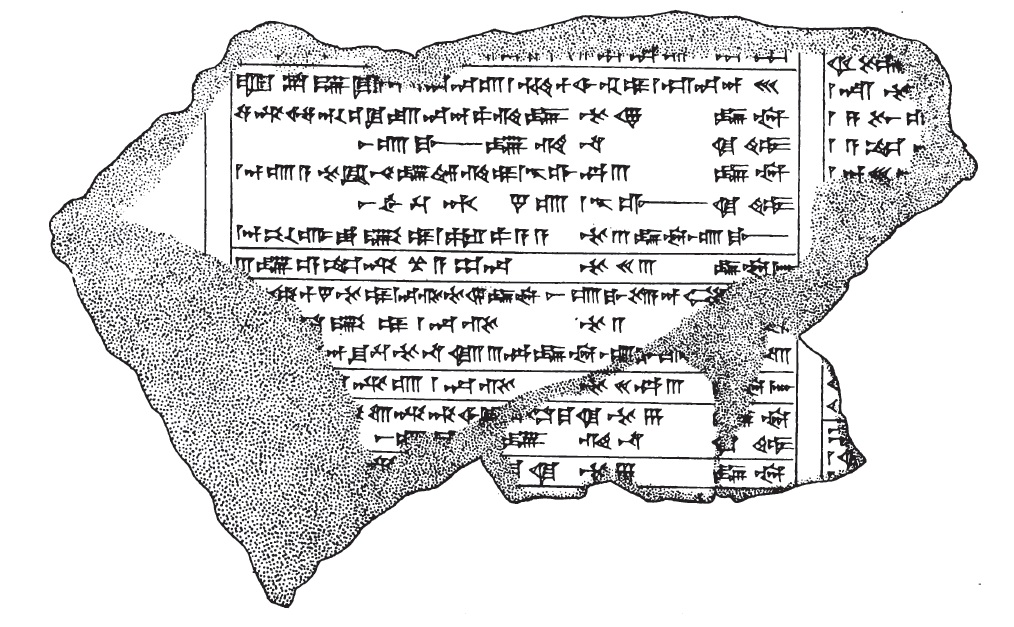
Illustration by Leonard William King of fragment K. 8532, a part of the Dynastic Chronicle listing rulers of Babylon grouped by dynasty

The main sources of information about Babylon—excavation of the site itself, references in cuneiform texts found elsewhere in Mesopotamia, references in the Bible, descriptions in other classical writing, especially by Herodotus, and second-hand descriptions citing the work of Ctesias and Berossus—present an incomplete and sometimes contradictory picture of the ancient city, even at its peak in the sixth century BC. Babylon was described, perhaps even visited, by a number of classical historians including Ctesias, Herodotus, Quintus Curtius Rufus, Strabo, and Cleitarchus. These reports are of variable accuracy and some of the content was politically motivated, but these still provide useful information.

Historical knowledge of early Babylon must be pieced together from epigraphic remains found elsewhere, such as at Uruk, Nippur, Sippar, Mari, and Haradum.

=== Early references ===
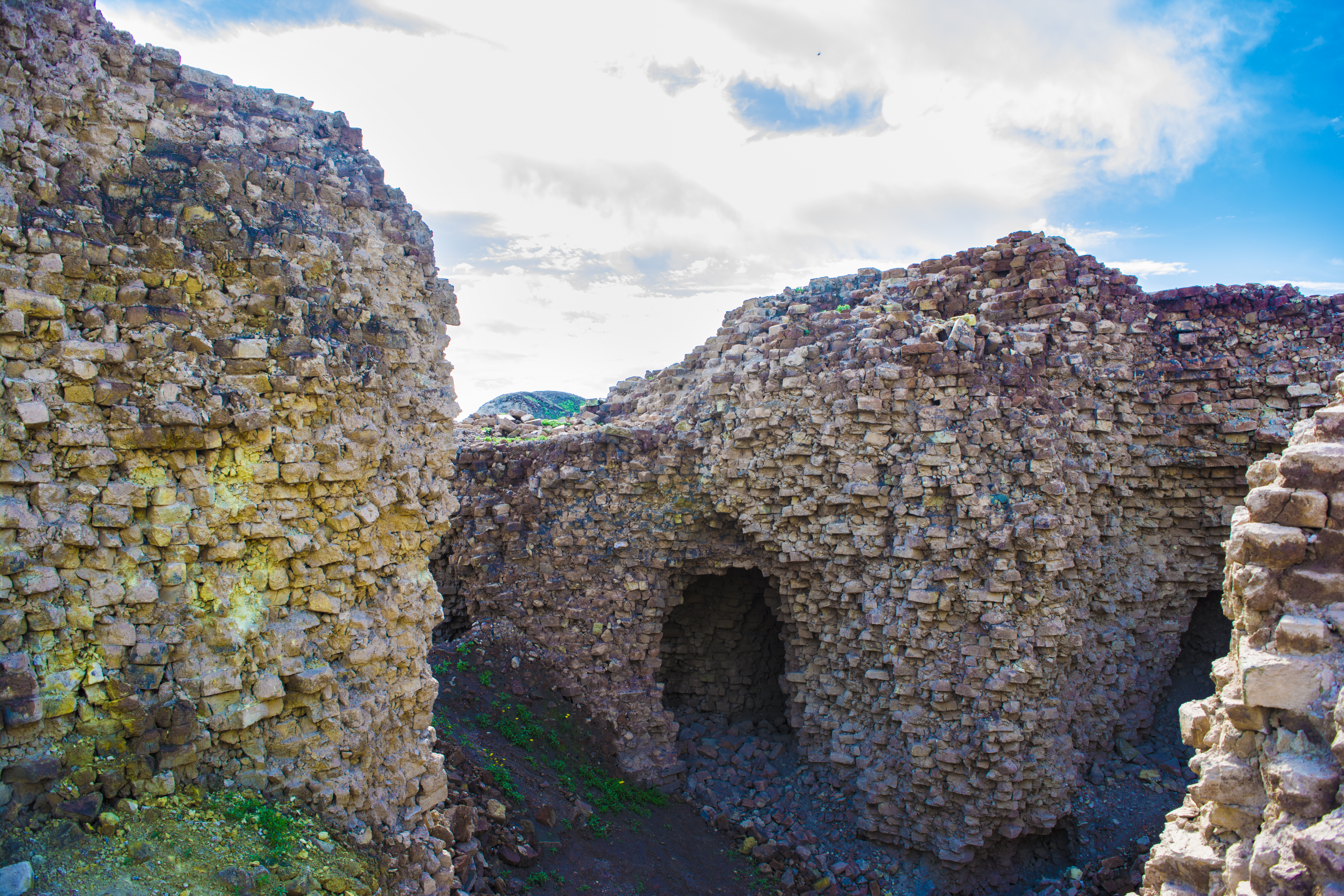
Brick structures in Babylon, 2016

The earliest known mention of Babylon as a small town appears on a clay tablet from the reign of Shar-Kali-Sharri (2217–2193 BC) of the Akkadian Empire. References to the city of Babylon can be found in Akkadian and Sumerian literature from the late third millennium BC. One of the earliest is a tablet describing the Akkadian king Šar-kali-šarri laying the foundations in Babylon of new temples for Annūnı̄tum and Ilaba. Babylon also appears in the administrative records of the Third Dynasty of Ur, which collected in-kind tax payments and appointed an ensi as local governor.

The so-called Weidner Chronicle (also known as ABC 19) states that Sargon of Akkad, c. 23rd century BC in the short chronology, had built Babylon "in front of Akkad" (ABC 19:51). A later chronicle states that Sargon "dug up the dirt of the pit of Babylon, and made a counterpart of Babylon next to Akkad". (ABC 20:18–19). Van de Mieroop has suggested that those sources may refer to the much later Assyrian king Sargon II of the Neo-Assyrian Empire, rather than Sargon of Akkad.

=== Classical dating ===
Ctesias, quoted by Diodorus Siculus and in George Syncellus's Chronographia, claimed to have access to manuscripts from Babylonian archives, which date the founding of Babylon to 2286 BC, under the reign of its first king, Belus. A similar figure is found in the writings of Berossus, who, according to Pliny, stated that astronomical observations commenced at Babylon 490 years before the Greek era of Phoroneus, indicating 2243 BC. Stephanus of Byzantium wrote that Babylon was built 1002 years before the date given by Hellanicus of Lesbos for the siege of Troy (1229 BC), which would date Babylon's foundation to 2231 BC. All of these dates place Babylon's foundation in the 23rd century BC. However, cuneiform records have not been found to correspond with these classical, post-cuneiform accounts.

== History ==
The Queen of the Night relief. The figure could be an aspect of the goddess Ishtar, Babylonian goddess of sex and love.

The earliest attested mention of Babylon dates to the late 3rd millennium BC, during the reign of the Akkadian ruler Shar-Kali-Sharri, one of whose year names mentions the construction of two temples there. Babylon was ruled by an ensi (governor) for the empire. Some of the known governors were Abba, Arši-aḫ, Itūr-ilum, Murteli, Unabatal, and Puzur-Tutu. After that, nothing is heard of the city until the time of Sumu-la-El. After around 1950 BC, Amorite kingdoms appeared in Uruk and Larsa in the south.

=== Old Babylonian period ===
A map showing the Babylonian territory upon Hammurabi's ascension in 1792 BC and upon his death in 1750 BC

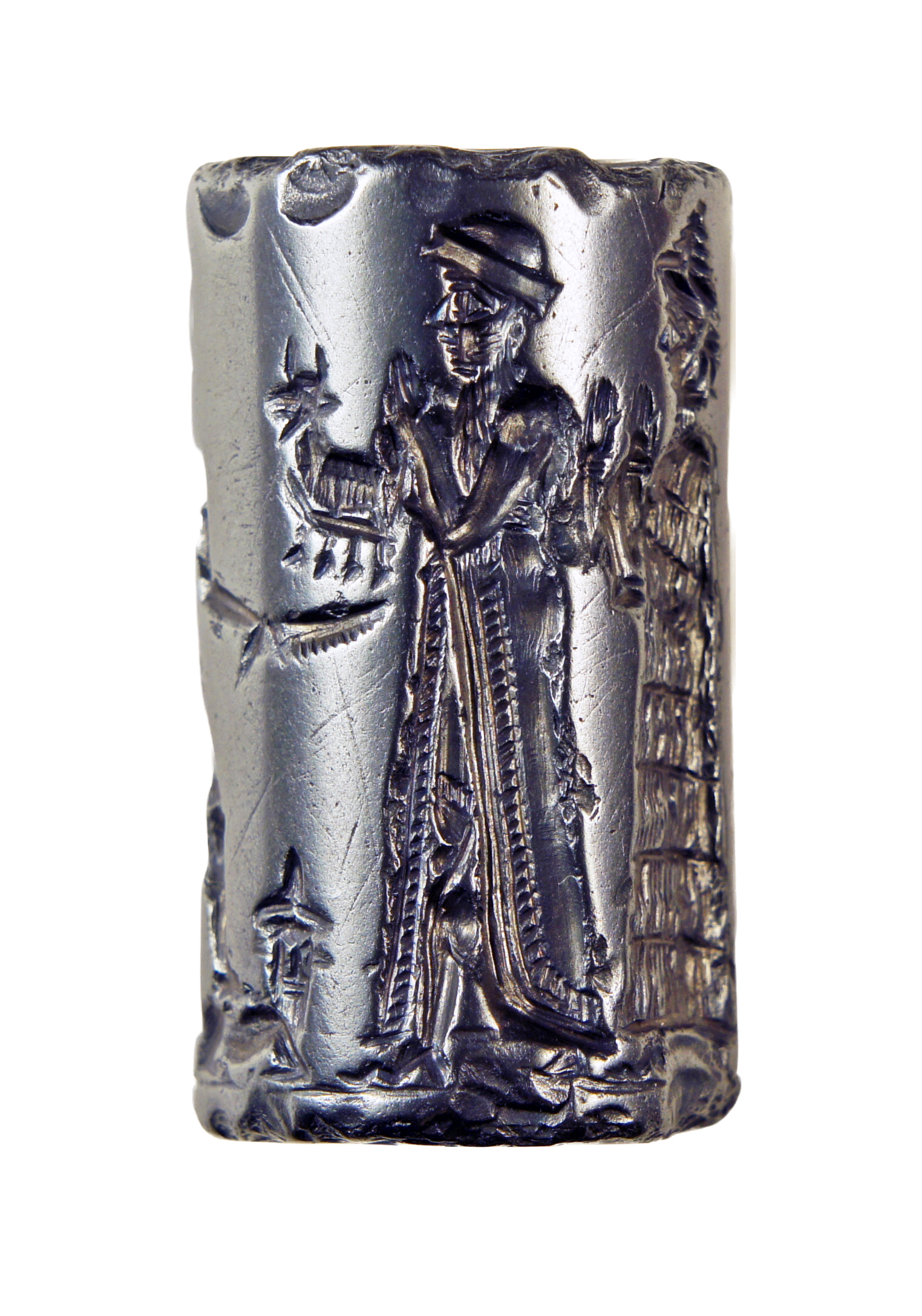
Old Babylonian cylinder seal, hematite. This seal was probably made in a workshop at Sippar (about 65 km or 40 mi north of Babylon on the map above) either during, or shortly before, the reign of Hammurabi. It depicts the king making an animal offering to the sun god Shamash.

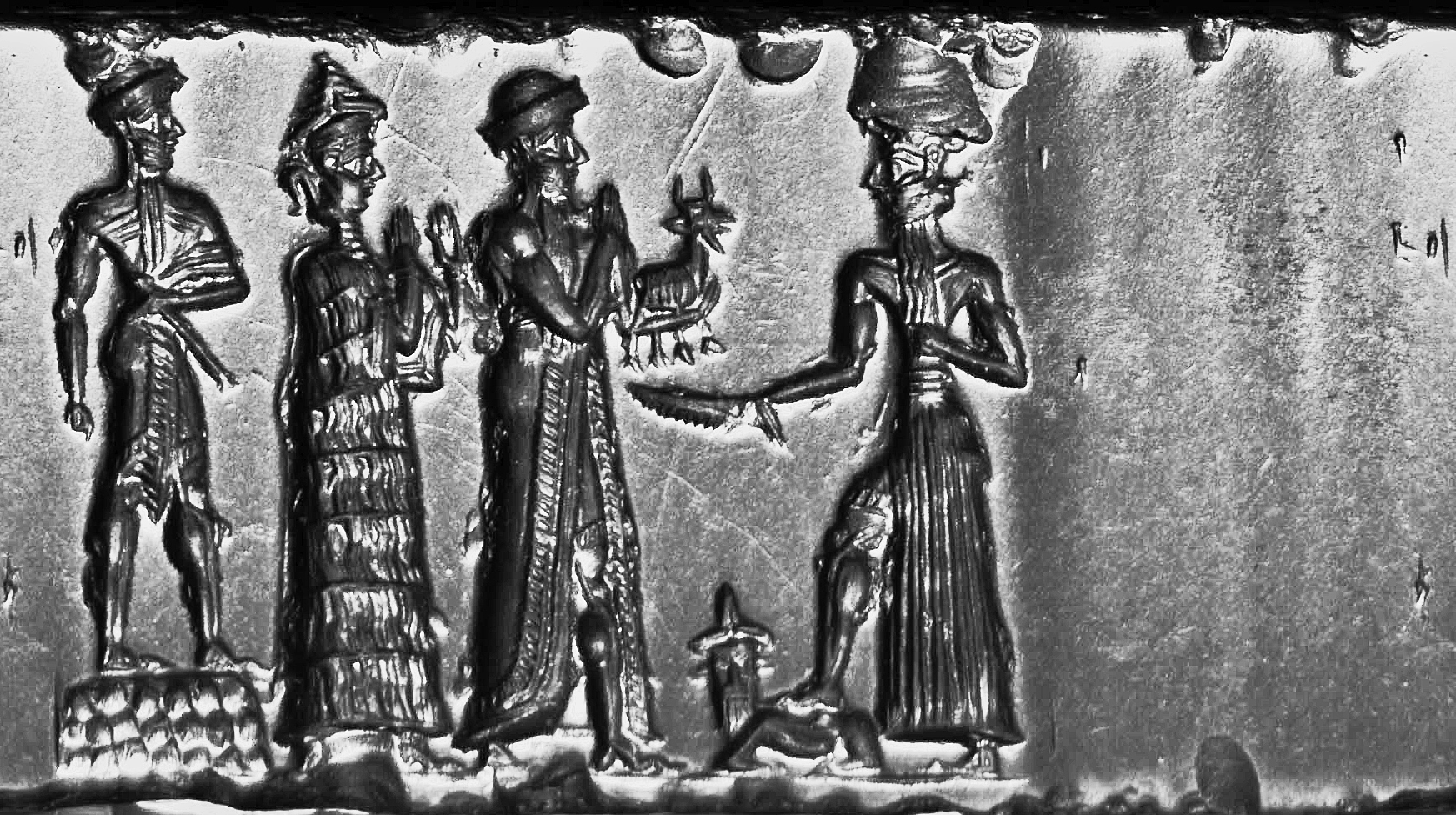
Linescan camera image of the cylinder seal above, reversed to resemble an impression

According to a Babylonian king list, Amorite rule in Babylon began (c. 19th or 18th century BC) with a chieftain named Sumu-abum, who declared independence from the neighboring city-state of Kazallu. Sumu-la-El, whose dates may be concurrent with those of Sumu-abum, is usually given as the progenitor of the First Babylonian dynasty. Both are credited with building the walls of Babylon. In any case, the records describe Sumu-la-El's military successes establishing a regional sphere of influence for Babylon.

Babylon was initially a minor city-state and controlled little surrounding territory. The first four Amorite rulers did not assume the title of king. The older and more powerful states of Elam, Isin, and Larsa overshadowed Babylon until it became the capital of Hammurabi's short-lived empire about a century later. Hammurabi (r. 1792–1750 BC) is famous for codifying the laws of Babylonia into the Code of Hammurabi. He conquered all of the cities and city states of southern Mesopotamia, including Isin, Larsa, Ur, Uruk, Nippur, Lagash, Eridu, Kish, Adab, Eshnunna, Akshak, Shuruppak, Bad-tibira, Sippar, and Girsu, coalescing them into one kingdom, ruled from Babylon. Hammurabi also invaded and conquered Elam to the east, and the kingdoms of Mari and Ebla to the northwest.

After the reign of Hammurabi, the whole of southern Mesopotamia came to be known as Babylonia. From this time, Babylon supplanted Nippur and Eridu as the major religious centers of southern Mesopotamia. Hammurabi's empire was destabilized after his death. The far south of Mesopotamia broke away, forming the native Sealand Dynasty, and the Elamites appropriated territory in eastern Mesopotamia. The Amorite dynasty remained in power in Babylon, which again became a small city-state. After the destruction of the city, the Kassites rose to control the region. Texts from Old Babylon often include references to Shamash, the sun god of Sippar, treated as a supreme deity, and to Marduk, considered his son. Marduk was later elevated to a higher status, and Shamash was lowered, perhaps reflecting Babylon's rising political power.

=== Middle Babylon ===
In 1595 BC, (Note: Please see Chronology of the ancient Near East for more discussion on dating events in the 2nd millennium BC, including the Sack of Babylon.) the city is thought to have been sacked by Mursili I, ruler of the Hittite Empire sometime during the 31-year reign of Samsu-Ditana, last ruler of the First Dynasty of Babylon. This is based on a line in the century later Telepinu Proclamation reading "Subsequently he marched to Babylon, and he destroyed Babylon, and defeated the Hurrian troops, and brought captives and possessions of Babylon to Hattusa." Originally, it was thought that cult statues of Babylon, including Marduk, were carried off to the Kingdom of Ḫana, but the source Agum-Kakrime Inscription is now generally considered a much later forgery. Thereafter, the Kassite dynasty took power in the city of Babylon, renaming it Karduniash, ushering in a dynasty that lasted for 435 years, until 1160 BC.

Babylon was weakened during the Kassite era, and as a result, Kassite Babylon began paying tribute to the pharaoh of Egypt, Thutmose III, following his eighth campaign against Mitanni. Kassite Babylon eventually became subject to the Middle Assyrian Empire (1365–1053 BC) to the north, and Elam to the east, with both powers vying for control of the city.

By 1155 BC, after continued attacks and annexing of territory by the Assyrians and Elamites, the Kassites were deposed in Babylon. An Akkadian South Mesopotamian dynasty then ruled for the first time. However, Babylon remained weak and under Assyrian domination. Its ineffectual native kings were unable to prevent new waves of foreign West Semitic settlers from the deserts of the Levant, including the Arameans and Suteans in the 11th century BC, and finally the Chaldeans in the 9th century BC, entering and appropriating areas of Babylonia for themselves. The Arameans briefly ruled in Babylon during the late 11th century BC.

=== Assyrian period ===
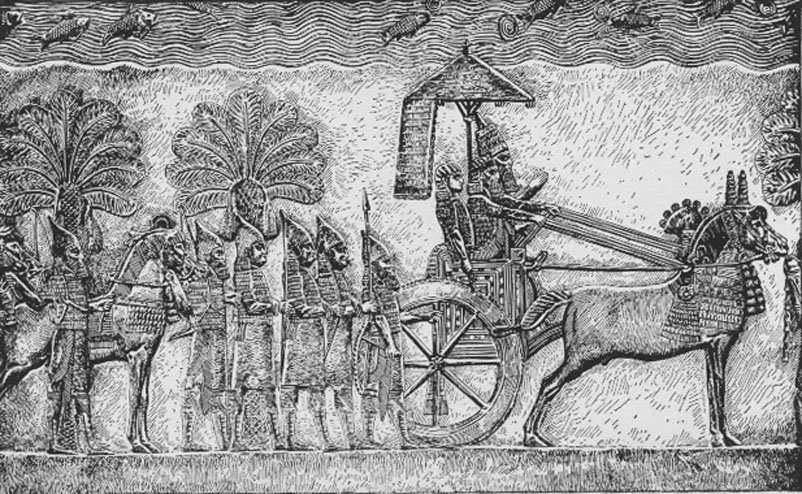
Sennacherib of Assyria during his Babylonian war, relief from his palace in Nineveh

During the rule of the Neo-Assyrian Empire (911–609 BC), Babylonia was under constant Assyrian domination or direct control. During the reign of Sennacherib of Assyria, Babylonia was in a continual state of revolt, led by a chieftain named Marduk-apla-iddina II, in alliance with the Elamites, and suppressed only by the complete destruction of the city of Babylon. In 689 BC, its walls, temples, and palaces were razed, and the rubble was thrown into the Arakhtu, the sea bordering the earlier Babylon to the south. The destruction of the religious center shocked many, and the subsequent murder of Sennacherib by two of his own sons while praying to the god Nisroch was considered an act of atonement.

Consequently, his successor, Esarhaddon, hastened to rebuild the old city and make it his residence for part of the year. After his death, Babylonia was governed by his elder son, the Assyrian prince Shamash-shum-ukin, who eventually started a civil war in 652 BC against his own brother, Ashurbanipal, who ruled in Nineveh. Shamash-shum-ukin enlisted the help of other peoples against Assyria, including Elam, Persia, the Chaldeans, and Suteans of southern Mesopotamia, and the Canaanites and Arabs dwelling in the deserts south of Mesopotamia.

Once again, Babylon was besieged by the Assyrians, starved into surrender, and its allies were defeated. Ashurbanipal celebrated a "service of reconciliation", but did not venture to "take the hands" of Bel. An Assyrian governor named Kandalanu was appointed as ruler of the city. Ashurbanipal did collect texts from Babylon for inclusion in his extensive library at Ninevah.

=== Neo-Babylonian Empire ===
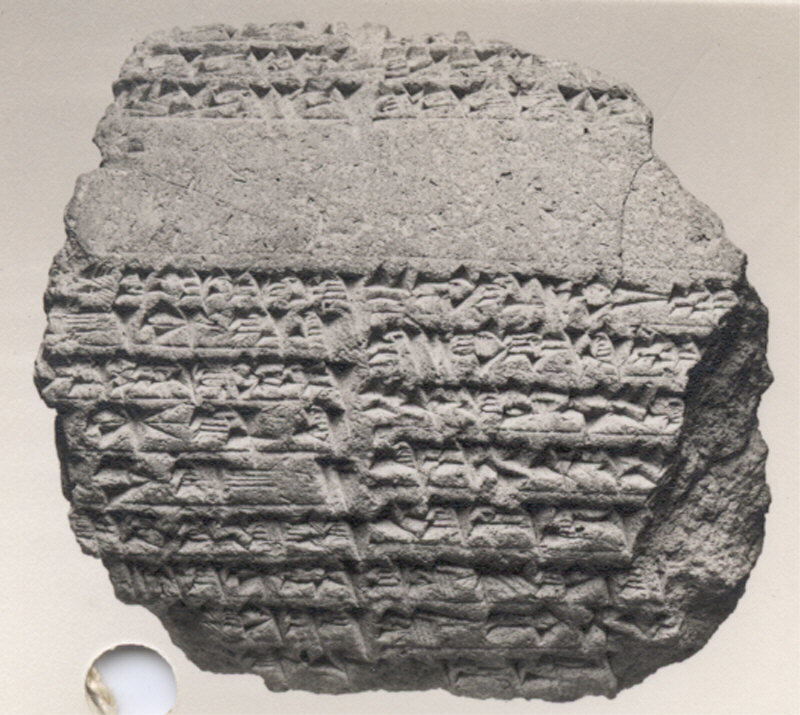
A cuneiform cylinder from reign of Nebuchadnezzar II, honoring the exorcism and reconstruction of the ziggurat Etemenanki by Nabopolassar.

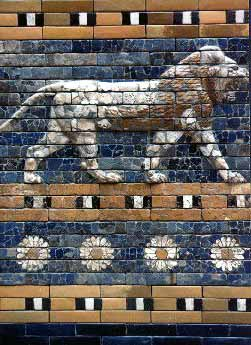
Detail of a relief from the reconstruction of the Ishtar Gate in the Pergamon Museum, Berlin

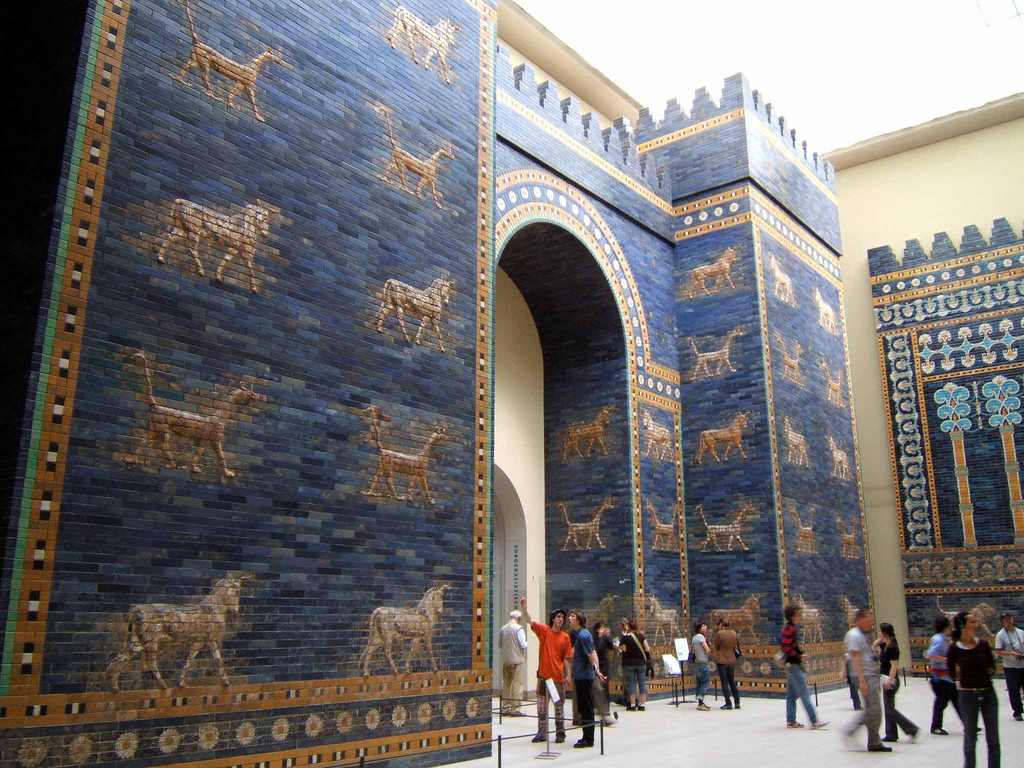
A reconstruction of the blue-tiled Ishtar Gate, Pergamon Museum, Berlin, which was the northern entrance to Babylon. It was named for the goddess of love and war. Bulls and dragons, symbols of the god Marduk, decorated the gate.

Under Nabopolassar, Babylon escaped Assyrian rule, and the allied Medo-Babylonian armies destroyed the Assyrian Empire between 626 BC and 609 BC. Babylon thus became the capital of the Neo-Babylonian (sometimes called the Chaldean) Empire.

With the recovery of Babylonian independence, a new era of architectural activity ensued, particularly during the reign of his son Nebuchadnezzar II (604–561 BC). Nebuchadnezzar ordered the complete reconstruction of the imperial grounds, including the Etemenanki ziggurat, and the construction of the Ishtar Gate—the most prominent of eight gates around Babylon. A reconstruction of the Ishtar Gate is located in the Pergamon Museum in Berlin.

Nebuchadnezzar is also credited with the construction of the Hanging Gardens of Babylon, one of the Seven Wonders of the Ancient World, said to have been built for his homesick wife, Amytis. Whether the gardens actually existed is a matter of dispute. German archaeologist Robert Koldewey speculated that he had discovered its foundations, but many historians disagree about the location. Stephanie Dalley has argued that the hanging gardens were actually located near the Assyrian capital, Nineveh.

Nebuchadnezzar is also notoriously associated with the Babylonian exile of the Jews, the result of an imperial pacification technique used also by the Assyrians, in which ethnic groups in conquered areas were deported en masse to the capital. According to the Hebrew Bible, he destroyed Solomon's Temple and exiled the Jews to Babylon. The defeat was also recorded in the Babylonian Chronicles.

=== Persian conquest ===
In 539 BC, the Neo-Babylonian Empire fell to Cyrus the Great, the king of Persia, with a military engagement known as the Battle of Opis. Babylon's walls were considered impenetrable. The only way into the city was through one of its many gates or through the Euphrates River. Metal grates were installed underwater, allowing the river to flow through the city walls while preventing intrusion. The Persians devised a plan to enter the city via the river. During a Babylonian national feast, Cyrus's troops diverted the Euphrates River upstream, allowing Cyrus's soldiers to enter the city through the lowered water. The Persian army conquered the city's outlying areas while the majority of Babylonians in the city center remained unaware of the breach. The account was elaborated upon by Herodotus.

Herodotus also described a moat, an enormously tall and broad wall, cemented with bitumen and with buildings on top, and a hundred gates to the city. He writes that the Babylonians wear turbans and perfume and bury their dead in honey, that they practice ritual prostitution, and that three tribes among them eat nothing but fish. The hundred gates can be considered a reference to Homer. Following Archibald Henry Sayce's pronouncement in 1883, Herodotus's account of Babylon has largely been considered to represent Greek folklore rather than an authentic account of a voyage to Babylon. However, recently, Dalley and others have suggested taking Herodotus' account seriously.

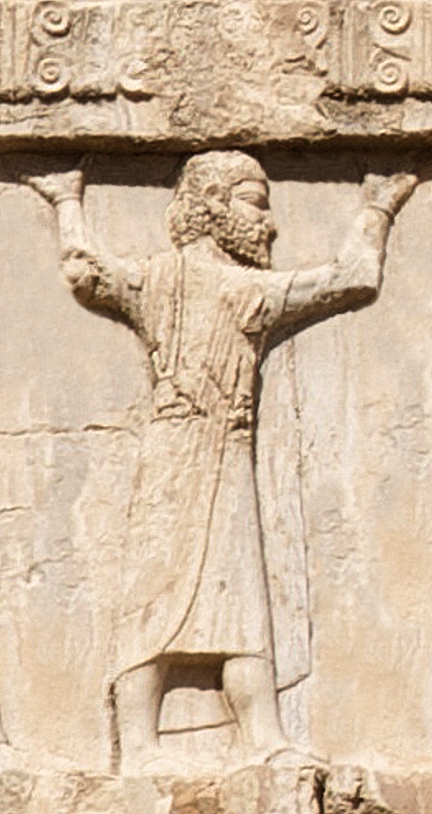
A Babylonian soldier in the Achaemenid army, c. 470 BC, Xerxes I tomb

According to 2 Chronicles 36 of the Hebrew Bible, Cyrus later issued a decree permitting captive people, including the Jews, to return to their own lands. The text found on the Cyrus Cylinder has traditionally been seen by biblical scholars as corroborative evidence of this policy; that interpretation is disputed, though, because the text identifies only Mesopotamian sanctuaries but makes no mention of Jews, Jerusalem, or Judea.

Under Cyrus and the subsequent Persian king Darius I, Babylon became the capital city of the 9th Satrapy (Babylonia in the south and Athura in the north), as well as a center of learning and scientific advancement. In Achaemenid Persia, the ancient Babylonian arts of astronomy and mathematics were revitalized, and Babylonian scholars completed maps of constellations. The city became the administrative capital of the Achaemenid Empire and remained prominent for over two centuries. Many important archaeological discoveries have been made, providing a better understanding of that era.

The early Persian kings had attempted to maintain the religious ceremonies of Marduk, who was the most important god, but by the reign of Darius III, over-taxation and the strain of numerous wars led to a deterioration of Babylon's main shrines and canals, and the destabilization of the surrounding region. There were numerous attempts at rebellion, and in 522 BC (Nebuchadnezzar III), 521 BC (Nebuchadnezzar IV), and 482 BC (Bel-shimani and Shamash-eriba), native Babylonian kings briefly regained independence. However, these revolts were quickly repressed, and Babylon remained under Persian rule for two centuries, until Alexander the Great's entry in 331 BC.

=== Hellenistic period ===
In October of 331 BC, Darius III, the last Achaemenid king of the Persian Empire, was defeated by the forces of the Ancient Macedonian ruler Alexander the Great at the Battle of Gaugamela, occupying Babylon. Under Alexander, Babylon again flourished as a center of learning and commerce. However, following Alexander's death in 323 BC in the palace of Nebuchadnezzar, his empire was divided amongst his generals, the Diadochi, and decades of fighting soon began. Babylon was within the Seleucid Empire throughout most of this period, and declined somewhat in importance but remained active.

=== Renewed Persian rule ===
Under the Parthian and Sassanid Empires, Babylon (like Assyria) became a province of these Persian Empires for nine centuries, until after AD 650. Although it was captured briefly by Trajan in AD 116 to be part of the newly conquered province of Mesopotamia, his successor, Hadrian, relinquished his conquests east of the Euphrates river, which became again the Roman Empire's eastern boundary.

However, Babylon maintained its own culture and people, who spoke varieties of Aramaic, and who continued to refer to their homeland as Babylon. Examples of their culture are found in Judaism's Babylonian Talmud, the Gnostic Mandaean religion, the East Syrian Rite of Christianity, and Manichaeism, the religion founded by Mani. Christianity was introduced to Mesopotamia in the 1st and 2nd centuries, and Babylon was the seat of a bishop of the Church of the East until well after the Early Muslim conquests. Coins from the Parthian, Sasanian, and Arabic periods excavated in Babylon demonstrate the continuity of settlement there.

=== Muslim conquest ===
Babylon (2022)

In the mid-7th century, Mesopotamia was conquered and settled by the expanding Muslim empire, and a period of Islamization followed. Babylon was dissolved as a province, and Aramaic and Church of the East Christianity eventually became marginalized. Ibn Hawqal (10th century) and Arab scholar al-Qazwini (13th century) describe Babylon (Babil) as a small village. The latter described a well-referred-to as the "Dungeon of Daniel" that was visited by Christians and Jews during holidays. The grave-shrine of Amran ibn Ali was visited by Muslims.

According to medieval Arabic writings, Babylon was a popular site to extract bricks, which were used to build cities from Baghdad to Basra.

In many cases, European travellers could not find the city's location or mistook Fallujah for it. Benjamin of Tudela, a 12th-century traveller, mentions Babylon, but it is not clear if he went there. Others referred to Baghdad as "Babylon" or "New Babylon" and described various structures encountered in the region as the Tower of Babel. Pietro della Valle travelled to the village of Babil in Babylon in the 17th century and noted the existence of both baked and dried mudbricks cemented with bitumen.

=== Modern era ===
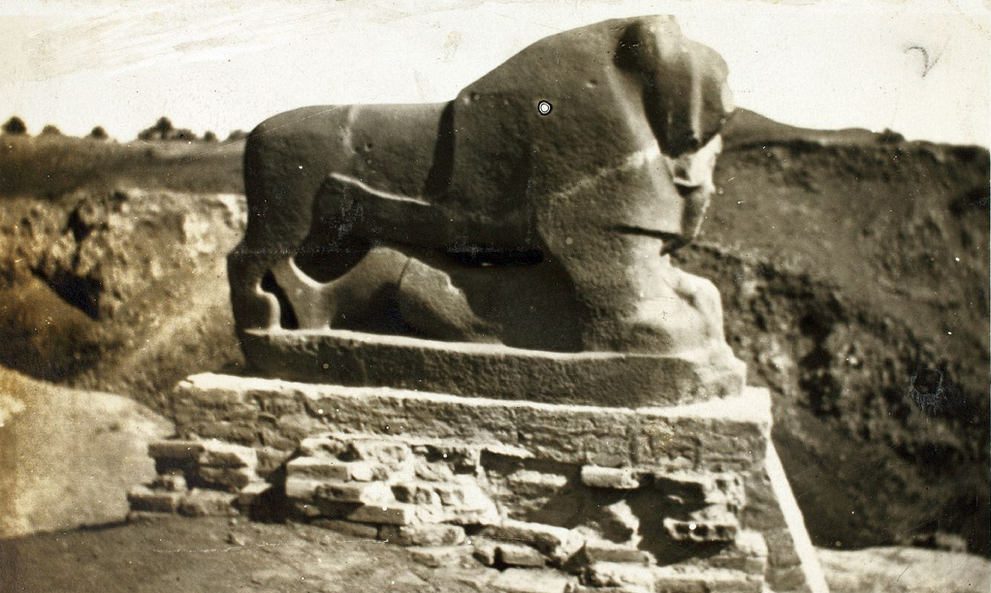
The Lion of Babylon

The eighteenth century saw an increasing flow of travellers to Babylon, including Carsten Niebuhr and Pierre-Joseph de Beauchamp, as well as measurements of its latitude. Beauchamp's memoir, published in English translation in 1792, provoked the British East India Company to direct its agents in Baghdad and Basra to acquire Mesopotamian relics for shipment to London.

By 1905, there were several villages in Babylon, one of which was Qwaresh, with about 200 households, located within the ancient inner city walls. The village grew due to the need for laborers during the German Oriental Society excavations between 1899 and 1917.

==== Iraqi government ====
The site of Babylon has been a cultural asset to Iraq since the creation of the modern Iraqi state in 1921. The site was officially protected and excavated by the Kingdom of Iraq under British Administration, which later became the Hashemite Kingdom of Iraq, and its successors: the Arab Federation, the Iraqi Republic, Ba'athist Iraq (also officially called the Iraqi Republic), and the Republic of Iraq. Babylonian images periodically appear on Iraqi postcards and stamps. In the 1960s, replicas of the Ishtar Gate and the Ninmakh Temple were built on site.

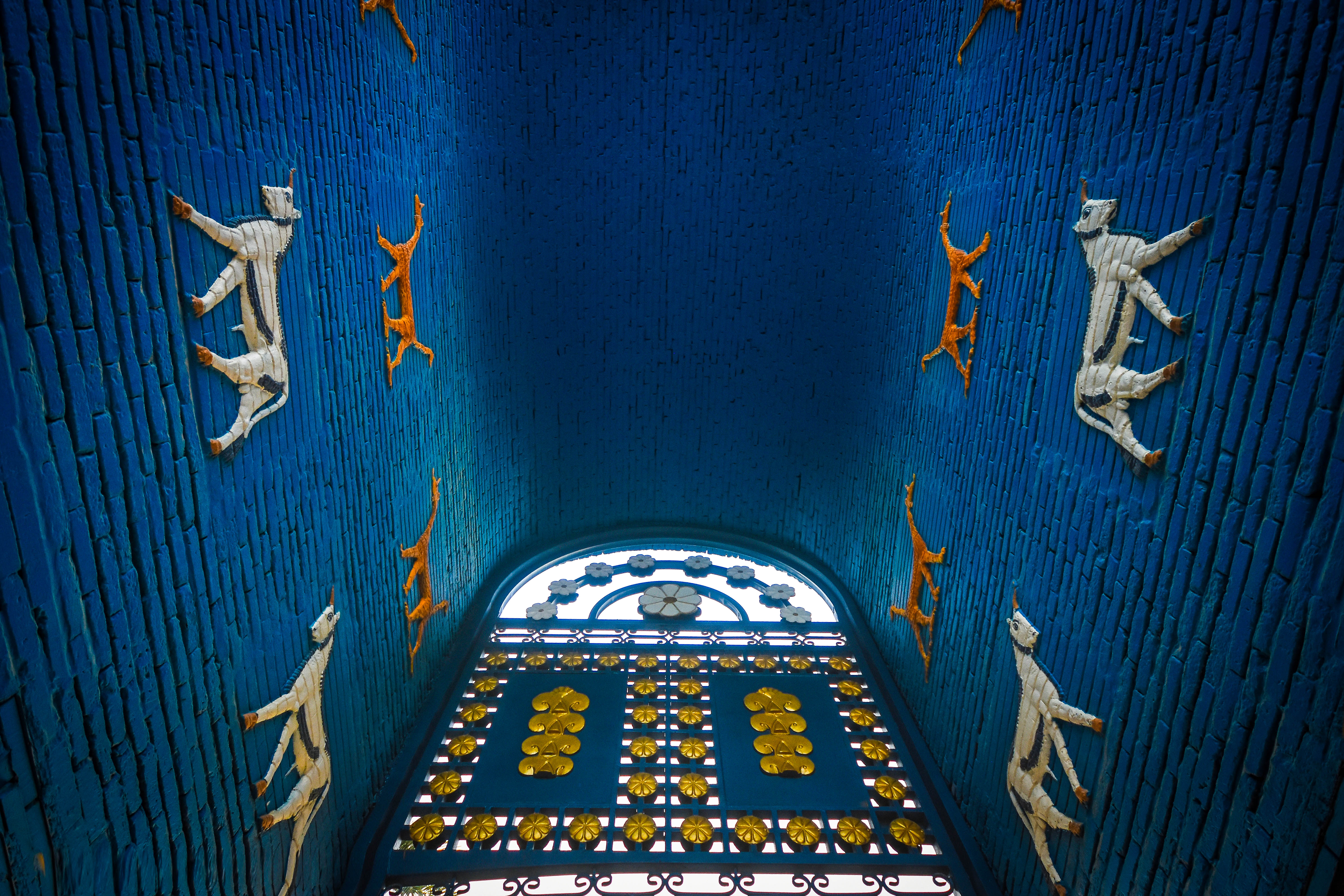
Inside the replica gate built in 1930

In February 1978, the Ba'athist government of Iraq under Saddam Hussein began the "Archaeological Restoration of Babylon Project": reconstructing features of the ancient city atop its ruins. These features included the Southern Palace of Nebuchadnezzar, with 250 rooms, five courtyards, and a 30-meter (98 ft) entrance arch. The project reinforced the Processional Way, the Lion of Babylon, and an amphitheater constructed in the city's Hellenistic era. In 1982, the government minted a set of seven coins, displaying iconic features of Babylon. The Babylon International Festival was held in September 1987 and annually thereafter until 2002, except in 1990 and 1991, to showcase this work. The proposed reconstruction of the Hanging Gardens of Babylon and the Ziggurat of Ur never took place.

Hussein installed a portrait of himself and Nebuchadnezzar at the entrance to the ruins and inscribed his name on many of the bricks, in imitation of Nebuchadnezzar. One frequent inscription reads "This was built by Saddam Hussein, son of Nebuchadnezzar, to glorify Iraq." These bricks became sought after as collector's items after Hussein's downfall. Similar projects were conducted at Nineveh, Nimrud, Assur and Hatra, to demonstrate the magnificence of Arab achievement.

In the 1980s, Hussein completely removed the village of Qwaresh, displacing its residents. He later constructed a modern palace in that area called Saddam Hill, over some of the old ruins, in the pyramidal style of a ziggurat. In 2003, he intended to have a cable car line constructed over Babylon, but plans were halted by the 2003 invasion of Iraq.

==== Under US and Polish occupation ====
A World Monuments Fund video on conservation of Babylon

Following the 2003 invasion of Iraq, the area around Babylon came under the control of US troops, before being handed over to Polish forces in September 2003. US forces under the command of General James T. Conway of the I Marine Expeditionary Force were criticized for building the military base "Camp Alpha", with a helipad and other facilities on ancient Babylonian ruins during the Iraq War. US forces occupied the site for some time and caused irreparable damage to the archaeological record. In a report of the British Museum's Near East department, John Curtis described how parts of the archaeological site were levelled to create a landing area for helicopters, and parking lots for heavy vehicles. Curtis wrote of the occupation forces:

They caused substantial damage to the Ishtar Gate, one of the most famous monuments from antiquity [...] US military vehicles crushed 2,600-year-old brick pavements, archaeological fragments were scattered across the site, more than 12 trenches were driven into ancient deposits and military earth-moving projects contaminated the site for future generations of scientists.

A US military spokesman claimed that engineering operations were discussed with the "head of the Babylon museum". The head of the Iraqi State Board for Heritage and Antiquities, Donny George, said that the "mess will take decades to sort out" and criticised Polish troops for causing "terrible damage" to the site. Poland resolved in 2004 to place the city under Iraq's control, and commissioned the Report Concerning the Condition of the Preservation of the Babylon Archaeological Site, which it presented at a meeting in December 2004. In 2005, the site was handed over to the Iraqi Ministry of Culture.

In April 2006, Colonel John Coleman, former Chief of Staff of the I Marine Expeditionary Force, offered to apologize for the damage caused by military personnel under his command. He also claimed that the US presence had deterred far greater damage by other looters. An April 2006 article stated that UN officials and Iraqi leaders have plans to restore Babylon, making it into a cultural center.

Two museums and a library, containing replicas of artifacts and local maps and reports, were raided and destroyed.

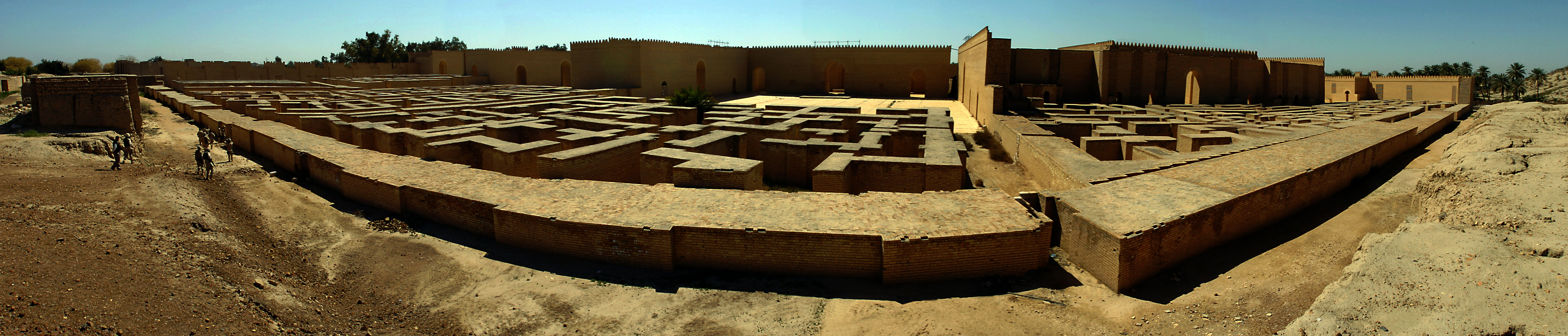
Panoramic view of ruins in Babylon, 2005

==== Present-day ====
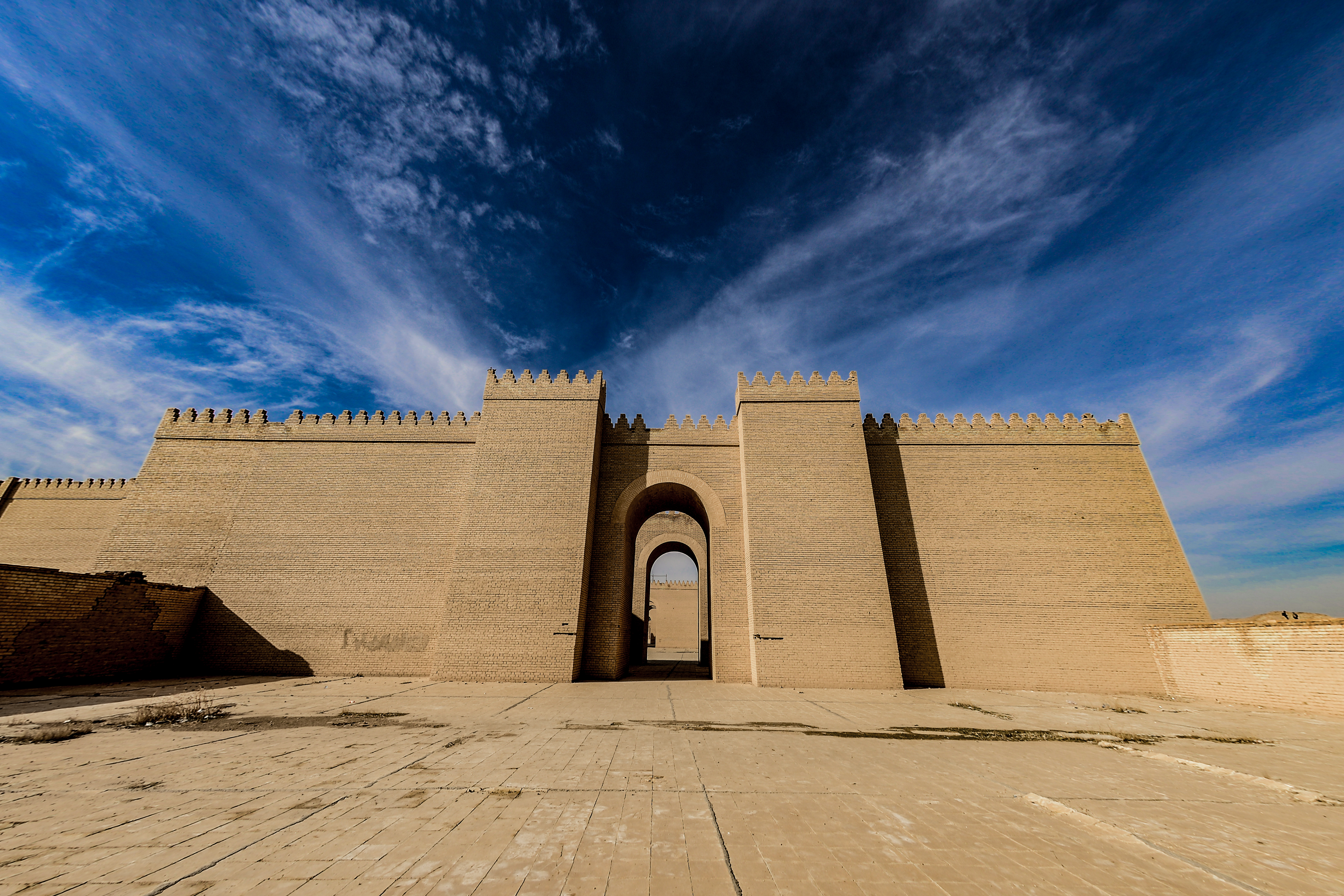
A gate in Babylon (2017)

In May 2009, the provincial government of Babil reopened the site to tourists. Over 35,000 people visited in 2017. An oil pipeline runs through an outer wall of the city. In July 2019, the site of Babylon was inscribed as a UNESCO World Heritage Site.

Thousands of people reside in Babylon within the perimeter of the ancient outer city walls, and communities in and around them are "rapidly developing from compact, dense settlements to sprawling suburbia despite laws restricting constructions". Modern villages include Zwair West, Sinjar Village, Qwaresh, and Al-Jimjmah, among which the first two are better off economically. Most residents primarily depend on daily wage earning or have government jobs in Al-Hillah. Some cultivate dates, citrus fruits, figs, fodder for livestock, and limited cash crops, although income from the land alone is not enough to sustain a family. Both Shi'a and Sunni Muslims live in Sinjar village, with mosques for both groups.

The State Board of Antiquities and Heritage (SBAH) is the main authority responsible for the conservation of the archaeological site. They are assisted by Antiquity and Heritage Police, and maintain a permanent presence there. The World Monuments Fund is involved in research and conservation. The SBAH Provincial Inspectorate Headquarters is located within the boundaries of the ancient inner city walls on the east side. Several staff members and their families reside in subsidized housing in this area.

== Cultural importance ==
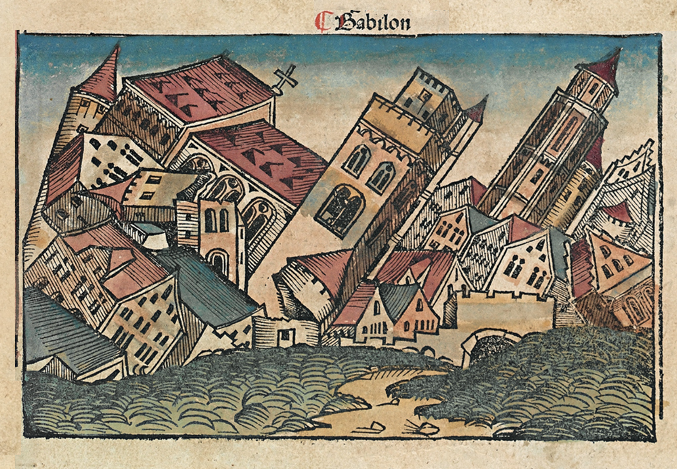
A 1493 woodcut in the Nuremberg Chronicle, depicting the fall of Babylon

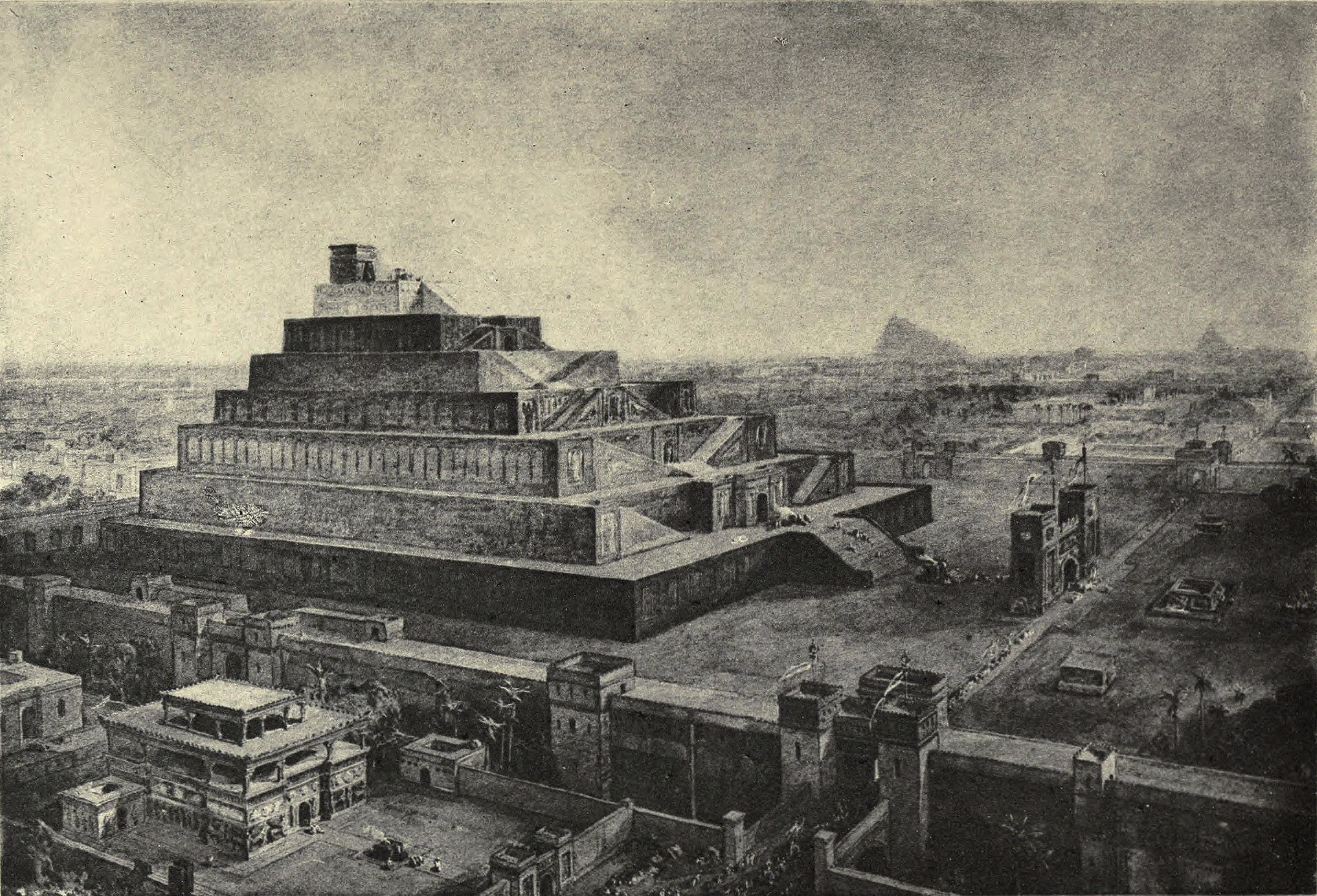
"The Walls of Babylon and the Temple of Bel (Or Babel)", by 19th-century illustrator William Simpson – influenced by early archaeological investigations

Before modern archaeological excavations in Mesopotamia, the appearance of Babylon was largely a mystery, and typically envisioned by Western artists as a hybrid between ancient Egyptian, classical Greek, and contemporary Ottoman culture.

Due to Babylon's historical significance as well as references to it in the Bible, the word "Babylon" in various languages has acquired a generic meaning of a large, bustling diverse city. Examples include:

- Babylon is used in reggae music as a concept in the Rastafari belief system, denoting the materialistic capitalist world, or any form of imperialist evil. It is believed that Babylon actively seeks to exploit and oppress the people of the world, specifically people of African descent. It is believed by Rastafarians that Babylon attempts to forbid the smoking of ganja because this sacred herb opens minds to the truth.
- Babylon 5 – A science fiction series set on a futuristic space station that acts as a trading and diplomatic nexus between many different cultures. Many stories focus on the theme of different societies and cultures uniting, respecting differences, and learning from each other rather than fighting or looking on each other with prejudice and suspicion.
- Babylon A.D. takes place in New York City, decades in the future.
- Babilonas (Lithuanian name for "Babylon") was a real estate development in Lithuania.
- "Babylon" is a song by Lady Gaga that uses allusions to ancient Biblical themes to discuss gossip.
- Eternals (2021) depicts Babylon on its greatest extent and is shown to be protected and aided in its development by the titular species team.

=== Biblical narrative ===
In Genesis 10:10, Babel (Babylon) is described as founded by Nimrod along with Uruk, Akkad and perhaps Calneh—all of them in Shinar ("Calneh" is now sometimes translated not as a proper name but as the phrase "all of them"). Another story is given in Genesis 11, which describes a united human race, speaking one language, migrating to Shinar to establish a city and tower—the Tower of Babel. God halts construction of the tower by scattering humanity across the earth and confusing their communication so they are unable to understand each other in the same language.

According to 2 Kings 20:12 and Isaiah 39 of the Hebrew Bible after Hezekiah, the king of Judah, became ill, Baladan, king of Babylon, sent a letter and gifts to him. Hezekiah showed all of his treasures to the delegation, and the prophet Isaiah later said to him: "Behold, the days come, that all that is in thine house, and that which thy fathers have laid up in store unto this day, shall be carried into Babylon: nothing shall be left, saith the LORD".

According to Daniel 5 the prophet Daniel lived in Babylon for most of his life. Nebuchadnezzar made Daniel ruler over the entire province of Babylon for having interpreted his dream. Years later, Belshazzar held a banquet, at which fingers of a hand appeared and wrote on a wall. Daniel was called to provide an interpretation of the writings, upon which he explained that God had put an end to Belshazzar's kingdom. Belshazzar was killed that very night, and Darius the Mede took over the kingdom.

Isaiah 13:19 says the following regarding Babylon: "And Babylon, the glory of kingdoms, the beauty of the Chaldees' excellency, shall be as when God overthrew Sodom and Gomorrah. It shall never be inhabited, neither shall it be dwelt in from generation to generation: neither shall the Arabian pitch tent there; neither shall the shepherds make their fold there." Jeremiah 50 says that Babylon "shall not be inhabited, but it shall be wholly desolate".

In Jewish tradition, Babylon symbolizes an oppressor against which righteous believers must struggle. In Christianity, Babylon symbolizes worldliness and evil. Prophecies sometimes symbolically link the kings of Babylon with Lucifer. Nebuchadnezzar II, sometimes conflated with Nabonidus, appears as the foremost ruler in this narrative.

The Book of Revelation in the Christian Bible refers to Babylon many centuries after it ceased to be a major political center. The city is personified by the "Whore of Babylon", riding on a scarlet beast with seven heads and ten horns, and drunk on the blood of the righteous. Some scholars of apocalyptic literature believe this New Testament "Babylon" to be a dysphemism for the Roman Empire. Other scholars suggest that Babylon in the book of Revelation has a symbolic significance that extends beyond mere identification with the first century Roman empire.

== Babylon in art ==
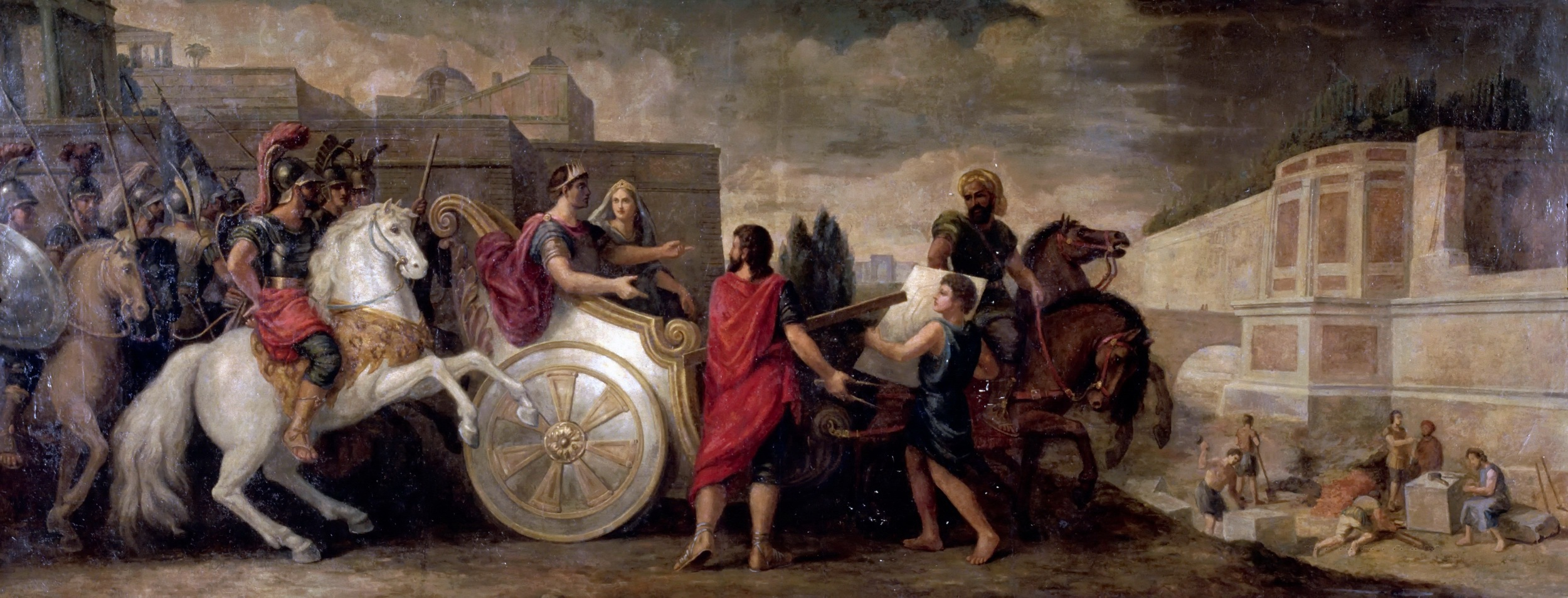
Nebuchadnezzar II ordering the construction of the Hanging Gardens of Babylon to please his consort Amytis, René-Antoine Houasse, 1676

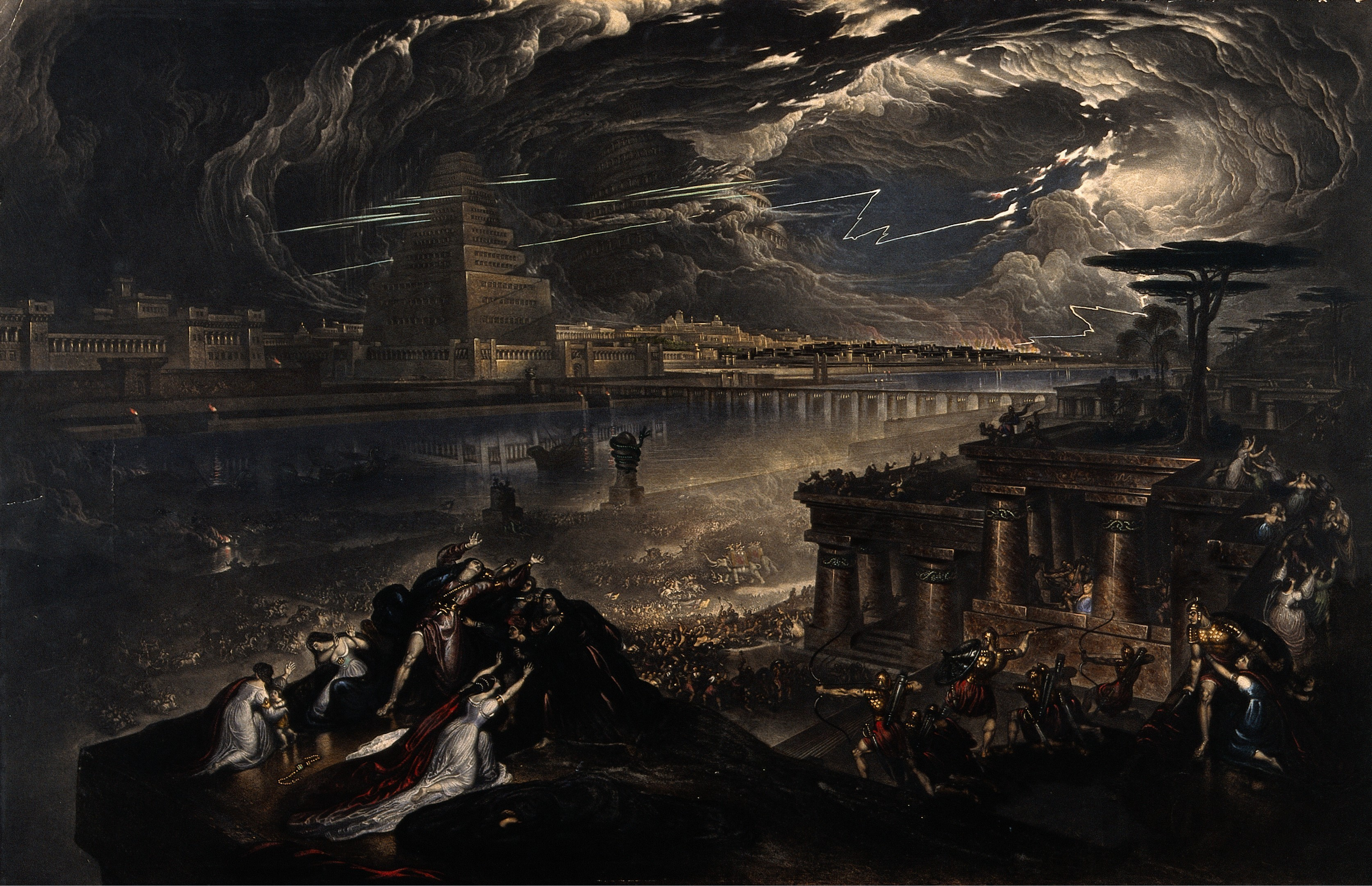
The Fall of Babylon, mezzotint by John Martin, 1831

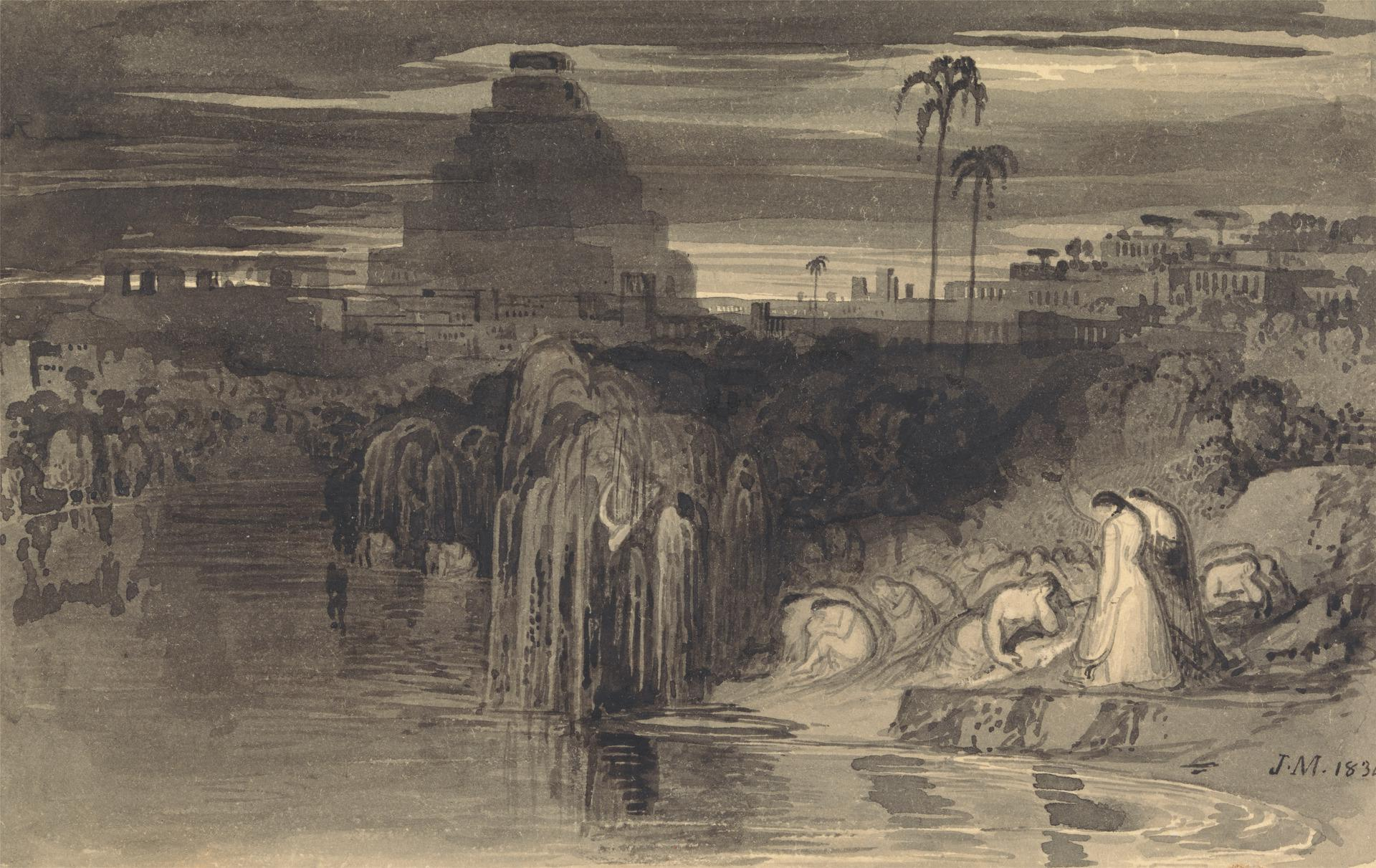
The Daughters of Jerusalem Weeping by the Waters of Babylon by John Martin, 1834

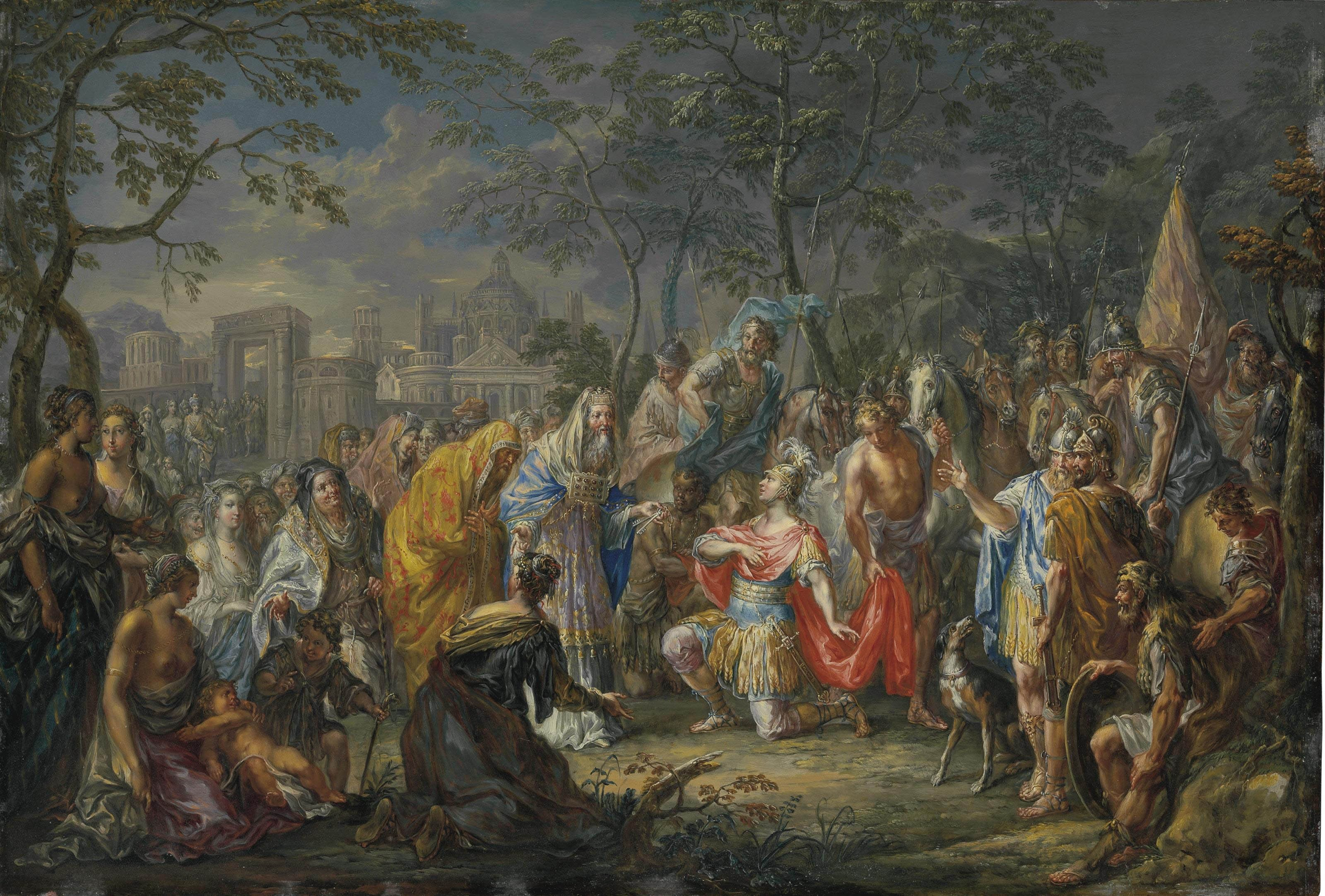
Alexander the Great receiving the keys of Babylon, by Johann Georg Platzer, c. 1740

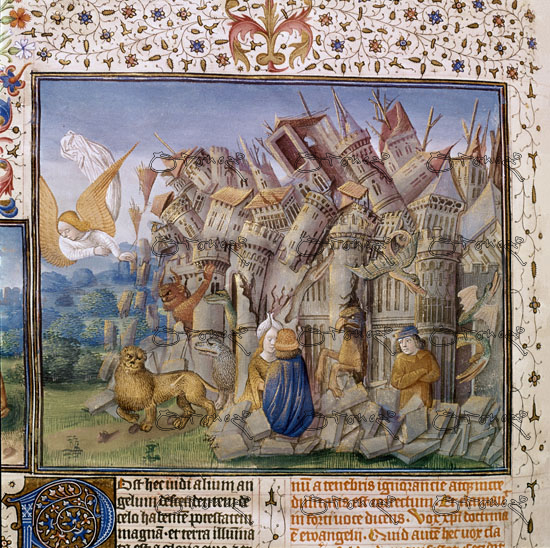
Figured Apocalypse of the Dukes of Savoy – Escorial E Vit.5 – Fall of Babylon, 15th century

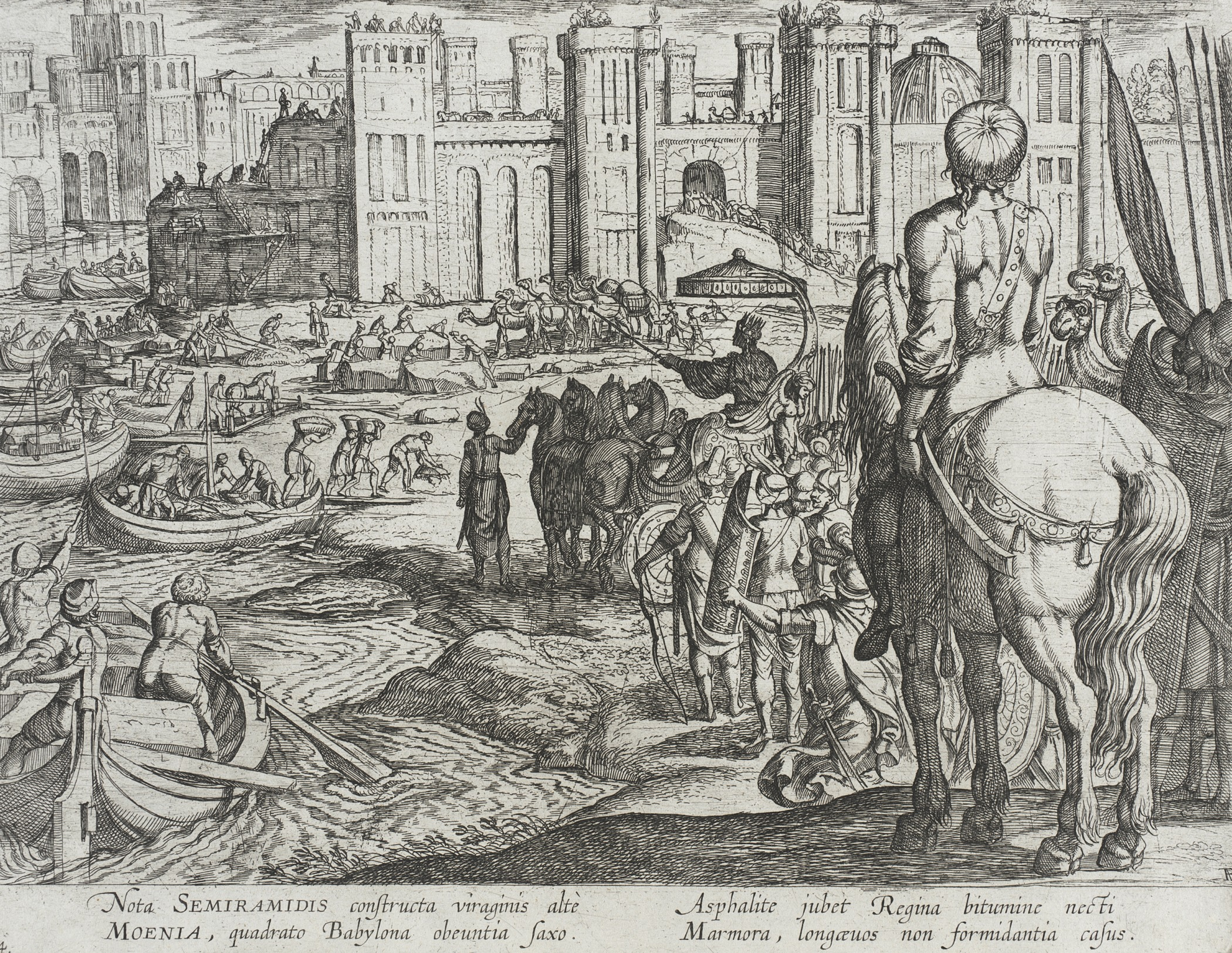
The Walls of Babylon by Antonio Tempesta, 1610

The Tower of Babel by Pieter Bruegel the Elder, 1563

== See also ==
- Akitu
- Cities of the ancient Near East
- Euphrates Tunnel – Legendary tunnel under the river Euphrates
- Jehoiachin's Rations Tablets
- List of Kings of Babylon
- Tomb of Daniel
