= Jacques Rousseau (diplomat) =

Swiss watchmaker (1683–1753)

Jacques Rousseau (1683, Geneva - 1753, Isfahan) was a Genevan watchmaker. He was sent on a diplomatic mission to Isfahan in Persia (now Iran) by Louis XIV of France in 1708. There he became jeweler to Shah Husayn of Persia at around the same time as his first cousin Isaac Rousseau (father of the writer and philosopher Jean-Jacques Rousseau) was jeweler-clockmaker to the Ottoman Sultan Ahmed III in Constantinople (1705-1711). Jacques died in Isfahan, where his tombstone is in the Christian (Armenian) Cemetery.

He was married to Reine de l’Estoile and his son Jean-François Rousseau and his grandson Jean-Baptiste Rousseau both also became diplomats to Persia and orientalists.
