= Jean Baptiste Rousseau =

Jean Baptiste Rousseau may refer to:

- Jean-Baptiste Rousseau (1671–1741), French playwright and poet
- Jean Baptiste Rousseau (fur trader) (1758–1812), influential fur trader and interpreter in Upper Canada
- Jean-Baptiste Rousseau (orientalist) (1780–1831), French orientalist
