= Jean-François Rousseau =

French diplomat

Jean-François Xavier Rousseau (16 October 1738, Isfahan, Iran - 12 May 1808, Aleppo) was a French diplomat and orientalist, nicknamed 'Rousseau of Persia' (Rousseau de Perse).

== Life ==
He was the son of the Geneva-born watchmaker and diplomat Jacques Rousseau (1683-1753) and Reine de l’Estoile. From 1757 Jean-François Rousseau was deputy director of the French East India Company at Basra while conducting diplomatic and trade missions in Persia. After the death of Claude Pirault, the Company's director, Rousseau took over his duties but not his title and continued successfully to defend French interests against competing claims, negotiated Persian-Ottoman relations and protected the rights of French resident aliens in the area.

In 1772 he married Anne-Marie Sahid, daughter of the Isfahan-born interpreter Joseph Sahid. The couple returned to France at the end of 1780, where Rousseau was appointed consul at Basra, returning in 1782. He was accompanied by the botanist André Michaux and in Aleppo also joined up with abbé Pierre-Joseph de Beauchamp, who was not only an astronomer but also vicar general of Baghdad. Rousseau, Michaux and de Beauchamp travelled with the caravan from Aleppo to Baghdad in September and October 1782. From 1783 Rousseau also acted as consul in Baghdad, a consulate previously attached to that in Basra.

Rousseau spoke seven foreign languages (Arabic, Persian, Turkish, Armenian, Portuguese, Italian and English) and was a major orientalist. His son Joseph succeeded him as consul at Basra in 1805, before becoming consul-general at Aleppo and to the Tripoli Eyalet.

== Sources ==
- Fisher, William Bayne; Jackson, Peter; Lockhart, Lawrence, eds. (1986). "The Safavid Period". The Cambridge History of Iran (Vol. 6). Cambridge: Cambridge University Press. p. 602. ISBN 978-0521200943.
