= Babilonas (shopping mall) =

- Location: Panevėžys, Lithuania
- Coordinates: 55°43′45″N 24°18′37″E
- Opened: 28 August 2007
- Developer: Ogmios group
- Manager: Justinas Lapinskas, Managing Director
- Owner: Ogmios group
- Architect: Gintautas Navickas
- Num. of stores: 78
- Num. of anchor tenants: 3: Topo centras (electronics, appliances, computers); Norfa XXL (food and groceries); Furniture store (several tenants in a single hall)
- Floor area: 1,798,161 m^{2} (19,355,240 sq ft) (2,181,316 m^{2} (23,479,490 sq ft) overall)
- Floors: 3
- Parking: 875
- Website: www.panevezys.molas.net

MOLAS Panevežys is a shopping and entertainment mall in Panevėžys, Lithuania (Klaipėdos street 143a). It is a part of a wider Babilonas real estate development.

== Shops and entertainment businesses ==
In the shopping mall, there are:

- 7 restaurants
- Cinema (Apollo Babilonas, 3 cinema halls).
- Separate hall for furniture sales (5,000 m^{2} (54,000 sq ft)).
- Electronics store (Topo centras, 1,545 m^{2} (16,630 sq ft)).

Various other stores and entertainment places (up to 400 m^{2} (4,300 sq ft)): clothes, sports and lifestyle, drinks, books.

The furniture retail hall is the largest in northeastern Lithuania (Aukštaitija).

The shopping center's anchor tenants include:

- Norfa XXL - Grocery anchor with 2,400 m^{2} (26,000 sq ft) of space.
- Sports Direct - Clothing anchor.
- Topo Centras - Electronics anchor with 1,545 m^{2} (16,630 sq ft) of space.
- Apollo Kinas - Cinema.
- Sinsay - 2nd clothing anchor with 1,100 m^{2} (12,000 sq ft) of space, as the largest Sinsay store in Lithuania.

One former tenant includes Tau.

== History ==
The construction of the shopping mall started in 2006 and ended in 2007.

In August 2008, the mall was expanded: the cinema and several additional shops were opened.

In 2007-2008, the primary market catered by the mall was that of household goods: furniture, construction, and interior décor. The other primary target market was that for entertainment (cinema, ice rink).

Since 2009, the market orientation changed: the number of interior goods stores lowered somewhat and at the same time number of stores selling soft goods such as clothing and shoes. In 2010, a supermarket (food store) opened for the first time in Babilonas as Tau.

In March 13, 2014, Norfa XXL opened in this shopping center with 2,400 m^{2} (26,000 sq ft) of retail space.

In 2024, the shopping center became MOLAS Panevežys.

== Image and architecture ==
As the name "Babilonas" means Babylon, the interior of Babilonas is modeled after the ancient Middle East. On the walls over the shop entrances there are frescoes with bulls and ancient people. In front of the main entrance, there are improvised columns. Inside a shopping center in a special terrarium a crocodile, named by children Babilonijus, lived for several years.
