= Jean-Baptiste Miroudot du Bourg =

French bishop (1722–1798)

Jean-Baptiste Miroudot du Bourg (6 August 1722, Vesoul – 24 May 1798, Hôpital des incurables, Paris) was a French bishop.

== Life ==
On 15 April 1776, he was made Latin bishop of Baghdad, the seat of a titular see under the bishop of Genoa and likewise appointed French consul to Baghdad. He set out for the city in 1781 with his nephew Joseph de Beauchamp as his vicar general, astronomer, and correspondent to the Académie des sciences. Miroudot stayed a few months in Aleppo, but did not move on to Baghdad, using health reasons as a pretext. He finally returned to France, where in 1783, he was dismissed as consul to Baghdad. On 24 February 1791, he assisted Talleyrand in the consecration of the first constitutional bishops, Louis-Alexandre Expilly de La Poipe, bishop of Finistère, and Claude Marolles, bishop of Aisne.
