= Pierre-Joseph de Beauchamp =

French diplomat, clergyman and astronomer (1752–1801)

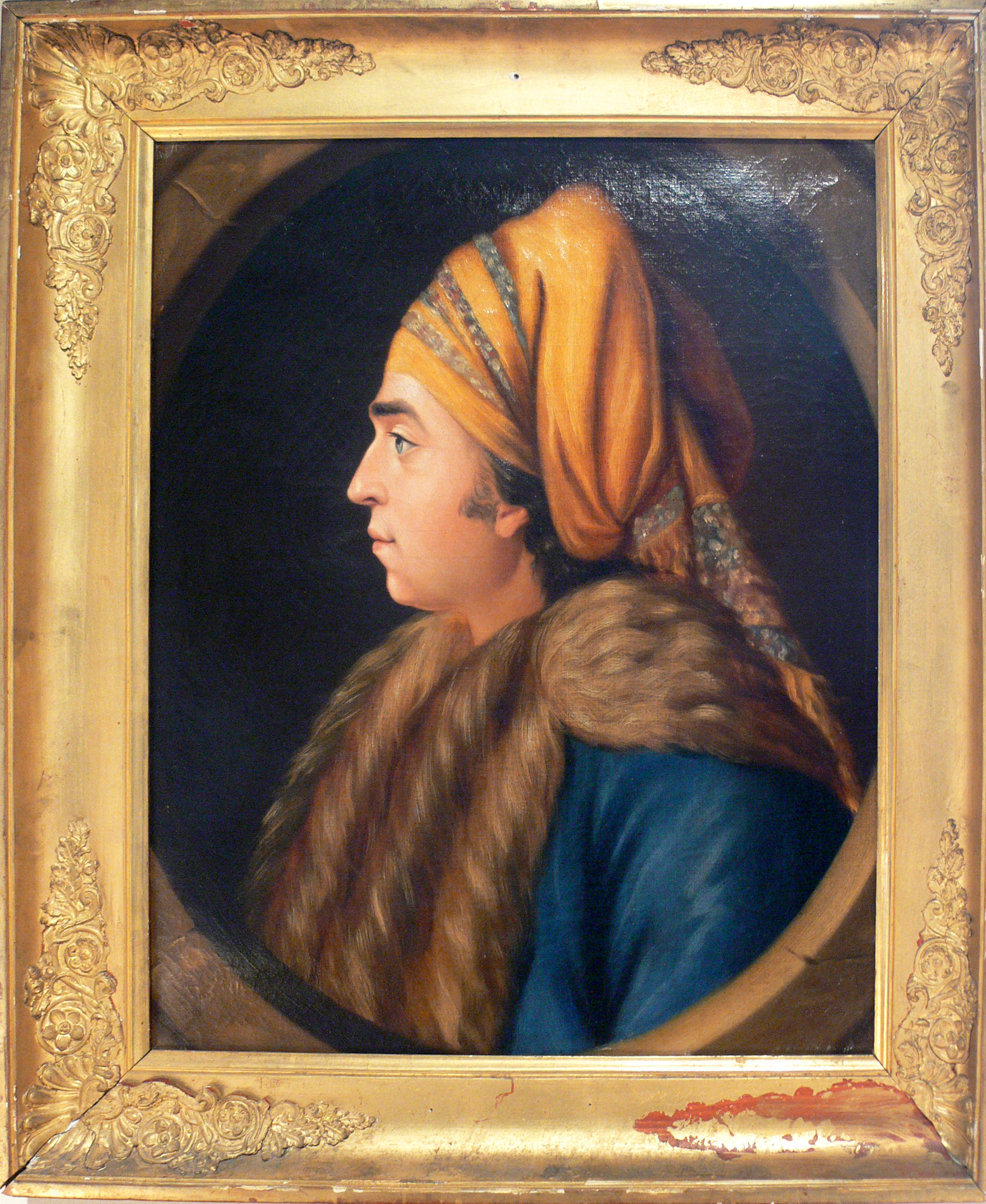
de Beauchamp by François-Marie Rosset, 1781.

Pierre Joseph de Beauchamp (28 June 1752, Vesoul 18 November 1801, Nice) was a French diplomat, clergyman and astronomer.

He was the son of the lawyer Xavier de Beauchamp. He was made vicar general to his uncle Miroudot du Bourg, titular bishop of Baghdad and set out for Aleppo with him in 1781. The following year he reached Baghdad with the French consul Jean-François Rousseau and the botanist André Michaux. After travelling to Persia, de Beauchamp returned to France in 1790.

He was made a member of the Institut d'Égypte on 7 September 1798, joining its physics section during the Institut's third session. From 3 March 1795 he became consul at Muscat, Oman. He was then sent on a conciliatory mission to Ottoman sultan in Constantinople by Napoleon Bonaparte. He left Alexandria on 13 February 1799, but his ship was captured by the Royal Navy en route. As the Ottomans had by now declared war on France, de Beauchamp, the French chargé d'affaires to Constantinople and the whole French ambassador's staff were all imprisoned at Yedi Kule. de Beauchamp died soon after his eventual return to France upon the Treaty of Amiens.

== Sources ==
- (in French) Régis Pluchet, L'extraordinaire voyage d'un botaniste en Perse. André Michaux : 1782–1785, éditions Privat, 2014.
- (in French) Edouard de Villiers du Terrage, Journal et souvenirs sur l'expédition d'Égypte, mis en ordre et publiés par le baron Marc de Villiers du Terrage, Paris, E. Plon, Nourrit, 1899, et L'expédition d'Égypte 1798–1801, Journal et souvenirs d'un jeune savant, Paris, Cosmopole, 2001 et 2003, p. 351.
- (in French) Yves Laissus, L'Égypte, une aventure savante 1798–1801, Paris, Fayard, 1998.
- (in French) Archives Nationales, AF IV 1687, dossier 2 : Pièces concernant le décès et le testament de l'astronome-diplomate Beauchamp, membre de l'Institut d'Égypte (November 1801).
- (in French) Bibliothèque Nationale de France, manuscrits, Fr. n.a. 10157 : Papiers de Beauchamp.
- (in French) Jean-Joseph Marcel, Supplément à toutes les biographies. Souvenirs de quelques amis d'Égypte [Sulkowski, Venture de Paradis, Gloutier, Ch. Magallon, Beauchamp, Belletête, Raige], par JJ. Marcel, Paris, H. Dupuy impr., 1834.
