= Jean-Baptiste Rousseau (orientalist) =

French orientalist

- Born: Jean-Baptiste-Louis-Jacques-Joseph Rousseau; 10 December 1780; Villeneuve-le-Roi
- Died: 22 February 1831 (aged 50); Marseille
- Occupations: Orientalist; Iranologist; Translators
- Spouse: Élisabeth Outrey

Jean-Baptiste-Louis-Jacques-Joseph Rousseau, most often called Jean-Baptiste Rousseau or Joseph Rousseau, (10 December 1780 – 22 February 1831) was an early 19th-century French orientalist.

He was the son of Jean-François Rousseau or Rousseau of Persia (1753–1808), consul of France in Basra and Baghdad and Anne-Marie Sahid. Jean-Baptiste Rousseau, married with Élisabeth Outrey, was himself consul in Basra in 1805, consul général in Aleppo and to the Tripoli Eyalet (1808).

== Works ==
- 1809: Description du pachalik de Bagdad, suivi d'une Notice historique sur les Wahabis
- 1813: Itinéraire de Perse par la voie de Bagdad
- 1817: Mélanges d’histoire et de littérature orientales
- 1818: Mémoire sur trois plus fameuses sectes du musulmanisme, les Wahabis, les Nosaïris et les Ismaélis
- 1818: Notice historique sur la Perse ancienne et moderne

== Sources ==
- France-Iran : quatre cents ans de dialogue, by Florence Hellot-Bellier, Studia Iranica, Cahier 34, 2007, Paris.
