= Al Khiyoot =

Al Khiyoot الخيوط
- Village
- Interactive map of Al Khiyoot
- Country: Iraq
- Governorate (muhafazat): Basra Governorate
- District: Al-Qurna District

Al Khiyoot (Arabic: الخيوط) is a village in Basrah Governorate, located in southern Iraq on the west bank of the Tigris river, north of Al Qurnah.
