= Muzeraa, Iraq =

Village in Iraq

Al-Basrah in Iraq.

Muzeraa (مزيرعة ) is a village in of Basrah Governorate, south Iraq. It is a31°0′57″N 47°25′50″E, on the east side of the Tigris River at the point where the Tigris, Euphrates and Shatt Al-Arab Rivers converge. It is opposite the city of Al Qurnah and near the Manjoor Oil Fields.

The topography is flat, the elevation is 4 m above sea level and the climate arid.

The area suffered greatly during the Iran–Iraq War, during which it was a major battlefield, and again after the 1991 Iraqi uprising.
