= Al Sweelh, Iraq =

Town in Basra Governorate, Iraq

Coordinates: 30.992°N 47.439°E

Al-Basrah in Iraq.

Al Sweelh (السويله) is a town of Basra Governorate in Iraq on the west bank of the Shatt al-Arab River, and is linked to the town of Al Qurnah by road bridge.

The topography is flat, the elevation is 4m above sea level and the climate arid. The area suffered greatly during the Iran–Iraq War, during which it was a major battlefield, and again after the 1991 Iraqi uprising.
