= Qurnah disaster =

Shipwreck at the confluence point of the Tigris and Euphrates rivers

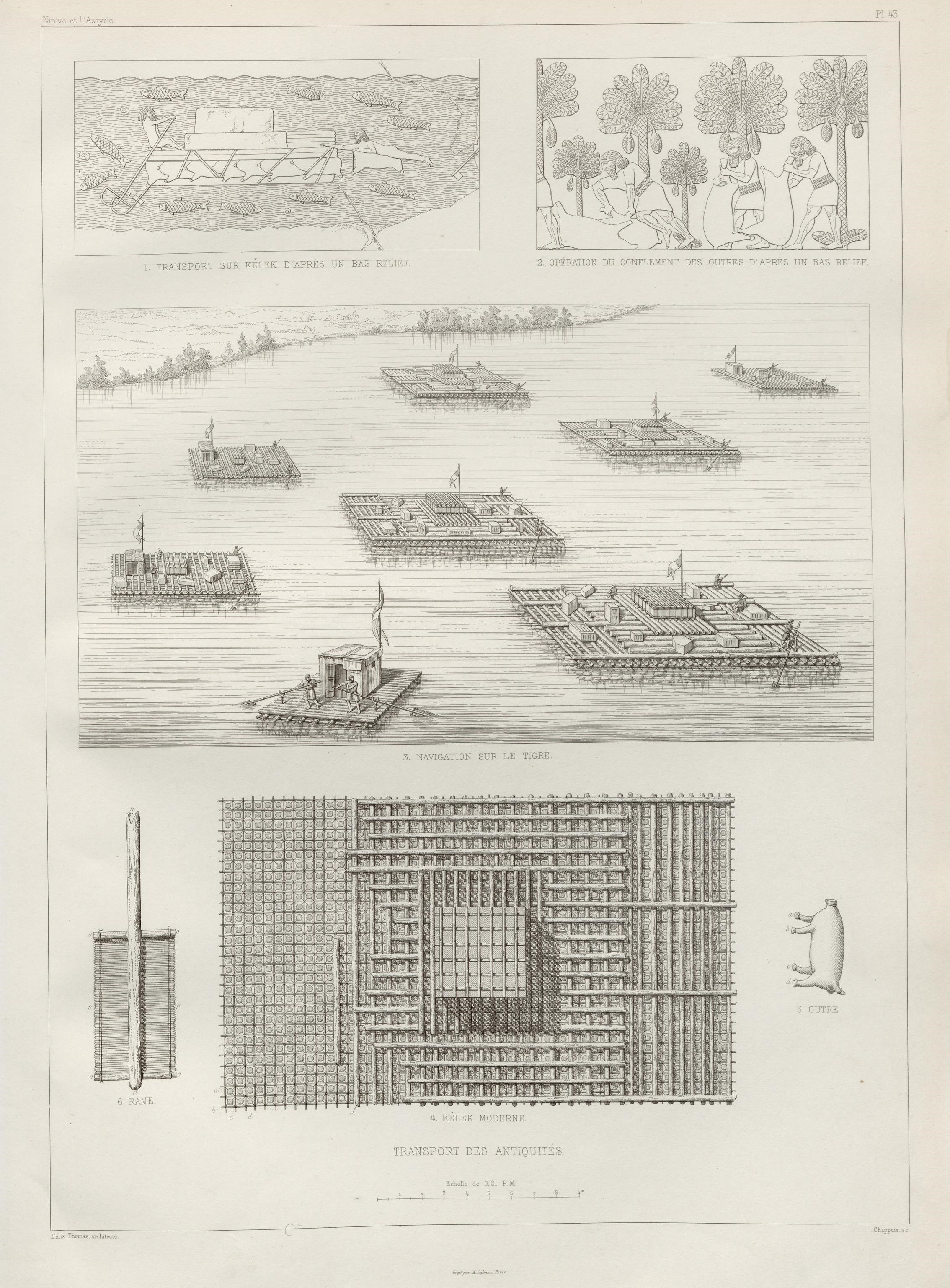
Convoy of rafts (Keleks) floating down the Tigris river loaded with antiquities in 1855 (V Place 1867)

The Qurnah disaster was a May 1855 shipwreck at Al-Qurnah, in modern Basra Governorate Iraq, near the confluence point of the Tigris and Euphrates rivers. It represents one of the most high-profile disasters in the history of archaeology. In the words of British Assyriologist C.J. Gadd, "the loss was, literally, immense, for there is no longer any exact information as to what this vast cargo contained".

The disaster took place during a period of civil unrest, during a period of fighting between the Al-Muntafiq confederation and the Ottoman Empire. The fighting ended with an Al-Muntafiq leader being appointed as provincial governor and tax farmer by the Ottomans, creating problems with the tribes not allied to their confederation.

== Background ==
Excavations at Dur-Sharrukin were being carried out by the new French consul, Victor Place, and in 1855 another shipment of antiquities was ready to be sent back to Paris. Antiquities from Rawlinson's expedition to Kuyunjik and Fresnel's to Babylon were subsequently added to the shipment.

Place, who was French consul at Mosul, had to leave the shipment when it reached Baghdad, as he had been summoned to his new consular post in Moldavia due to the ongoing Crimean War. He appointed a Swiss language professor named A. Clément as his consular agent and to manage the shipment the rest of the way.

In 1850 the two largest winged lions from Nimrud were lost in a river accident 3/4 of a mile from the Tigris at Qurnah. In 1851 Hormud Rassam had loaded 14 crates of sculptures from Kuyunjik, along with a few from Nimrud, onto a raft which was then attacked by "Arabs" (alternately "Bedween") at Kalah Sharkat (alternately "Kalah Shirqa") who smashed the sculptures and threw them into the river, being interested only in the wood of the crates and raft. Contents included wall panels and the "Patriarch’s vase", a Late Abbasid jar.

== Cargo ==
A cargo ship and four rafts were prepared to carry the artifacts, but even this substantial effort was overwhelmed by the sheer number of items to be transported. The cargo, mainly intended for the British Museum but including 80 cases intended for the Prussian Government as well as 40 cases with remains from the French Mission to Mesopotamia and Media, included:

- Austen Henry Layard and Julius Oppert dug briefly at Kish in early 1852 and those finds were part of the lost cargo
- Excavation notes of Victor Place
- Leaden foundation tablets from Khorsabad and their inscribed stone box
- 2 winged, human-headed Lamassu bulls, weighing almost 30 tonnes each
- 2 winged genies, weighing almost 13 tonnes each
- Over 150 crates of all dimensions, including basalt and alabaster statues, bas-reliefs, and many inscribed objects in iron, bronze, gold and silver

Two rafts reached Basrah with a cargo containing:

- 1 bull
- 1 winged genie
- 20-28 twenty crates containing bas-reliefs

== Disaster ==
The troubles began once the convoy left Baghdad in May 1855, as the banks of the river Tigris were controlled by local sheikhs who were hostile to the Ottoman authorities and frequently raided ships sailing by. During the journey, the convoy was boarded several times, forcing the crew to relinquish most of their money and supplies in order to be allowed further passage on the river.

Once the convoy reached Al-Qurnah (Kurnah) it was assaulted by local pirates led by Sheikh Abu Saad, whose actions sank the main cargo ship and forced the four rafts aground shortly afterwards.

The entire shipment was almost completely lost with only 28 of over 200 crates eventually making it to the Louvre in Paris.

== Recovery efforts ==
Subsequent efforts to recover the lost antiquities, including a Japanese expedition in 1971–2, have been mostly unsuccessful. The Japanese work, by the Japan Mission for the Survey of the Under-Water Antiquities at Qurnah, under the auspices of the Society for Near Eastern Studies in Japan, the Directorate General of Antiquities of Iraqi Government and the Chunichi Newspapers, began October, 1971 and continued until 31 January 1972. The effort began with examining the Tigris riverbed from the junction point with the Euphrates river to 7 kilometers upstream using sonar. This identified 24 possible points of interest which were then examined by dredging and by divers, finding nothing. The team then surveyed the areal location, reviewed the historical material, and spoke to local elders.

== See also ==
- Cities of the ancient Near East
