= Fulgence Fresnel =

French orientalist

- Born: 16 April 1795; Mathieu, Calvados
- Died: 30 November 1855 (aged 60); Baghdad
- Occupations: Assyriologist; Orientalist; Translator; Diplomat
- Relatives: Augustin-Jean Fresnel (brother); Léonor Mérimée (uncle); Prosper Mérimée (cousin)

Fulgence Fresnel (/ˈfreɪn-, ˈfrɛn.ɛl, -əl/ FRAYN-, FREN-el, -əl or /freɪˈnɛl/ fray-NEL; French: [fylʒɑ̃s fʁɛnɛl]; (15 April 1795 – 30 November 1855) was a French Orientalist. He was brother of physicist Augustin Fresnel (1788–1827). Fresnel was an Orientalist scholar who led one of the first archaeological teams to excavate in Mesopotamia.

== Education ==
As a young man, Fresnel studied sciences, literature, and languages, and translated a few works by Berzelius, stories by German novelist Johann Ludwig Tieck (1773–1853) and fragments of a Chinese novel (Fragments chinois, 1822–23). He was a pupil of Sylvestre de Sacy (1768–1838) in Paris, and in 1826 he undertook studies of the language and history of the Arabs at Maronite College in Rome.

== Career ==
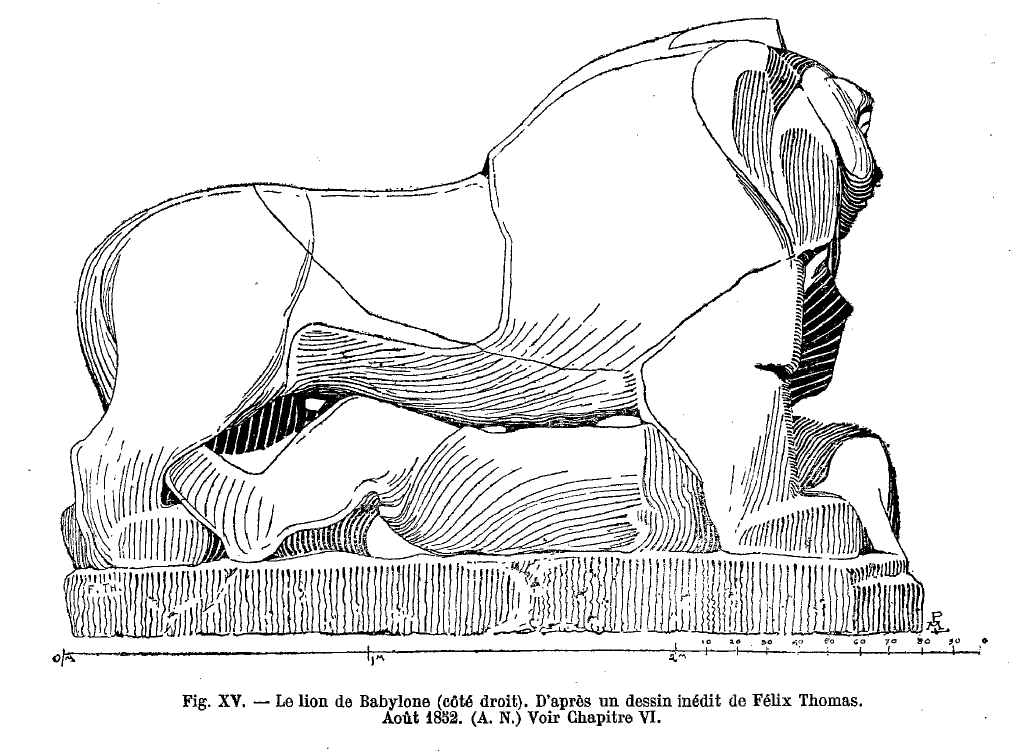
A mission drawing of the Lion of Babylon drawn by Thomas in 1852

Fresnel was appointed French consular agent in Cairo in 1837, and then consul in the Red Sea port city of Jeddah. In Arabia, he became a proficient speaker of local dialects, and during this time period, he came into contact with descendants of the Himyarites. Fresnel is credited as the first European to provide a translation of ancient Himyarite inscriptions. He also wrote the first description of the Shehri language. He was a prominent member of the Société Asiatique and considered one of France's leading Arabists of the period. He was named chevalier de la Légion d'honneur in 1849.

In 1851, he was put in charge of the French scientific expedition to Mesopotamia, where he was accompanied by assyriologist Jules Oppert, the architect, Felix Thomas and expedition administrator Edouard Perreymond. The expedition suffered misfortunes from ill health, uncertainties due to the Arab unrest in the Ottoman Empire and ultimately critical financial issues. Nevertheless, it has been argued that the expedition discovered the true location of ancient Babylon.

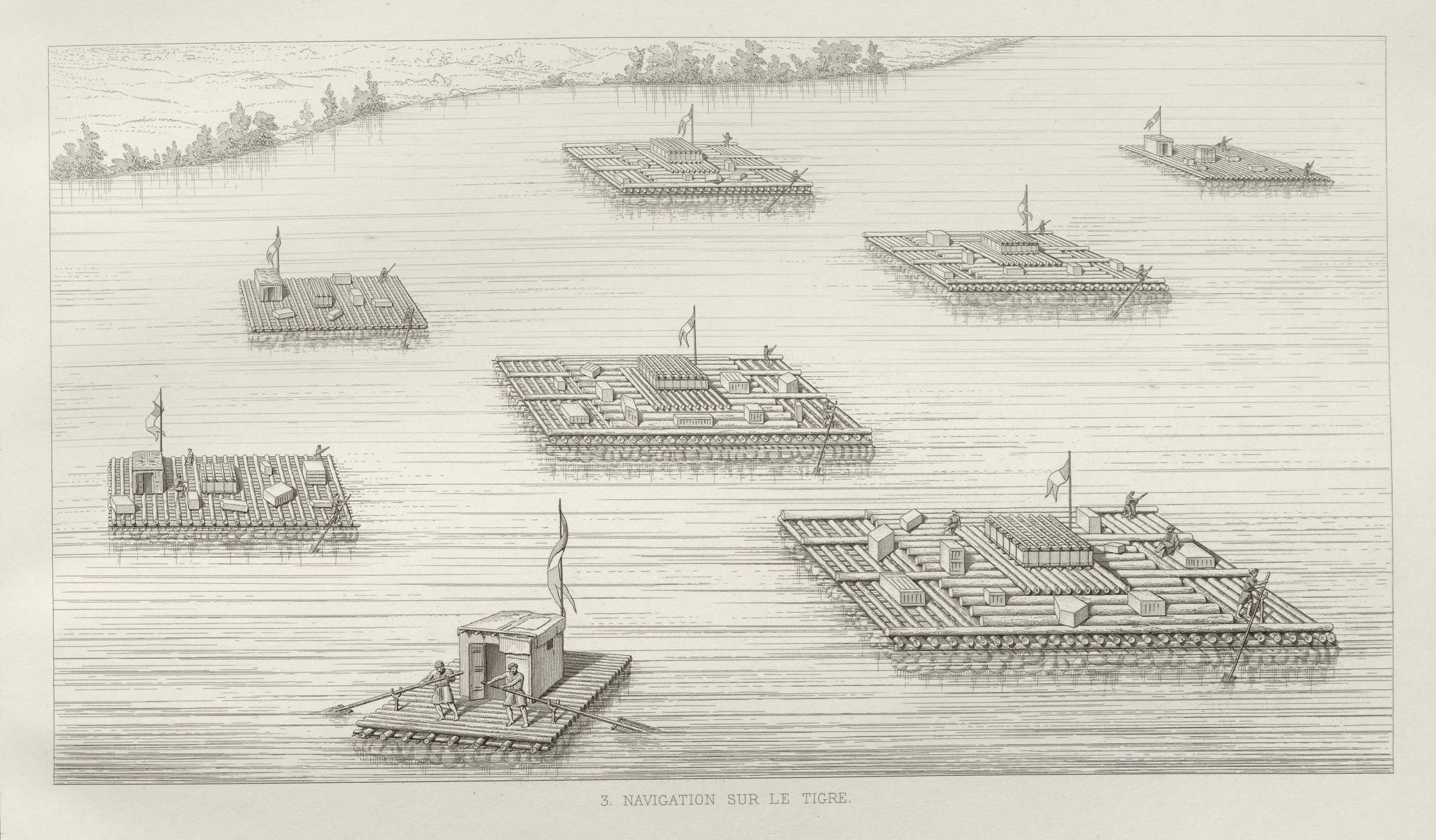
Rafts carrying the mission's excavations down the River Tigris (Victor Place 1867)

Much of the mission's work was subsequently lost in May 1855 when the rafts transporting it were attacked and sunk on the river Tigris. Subsequent efforts to recover the over 200 cases of lost antiquities at Al-Qurnah, including a Japanese expedition in 1971-2, have as yet been unsuccessful. One notable feature of the expedition was the use of a new and still secret procedure for making casts, developed by Lattin de Laval.

Oppert and Thomas had already left the expedition in 1854, while Fresnel chose to remain in the Middle East. Further to the Al-Qurnah Disaster noted above, he died of consumption in Baghdad on 30 November 1855. Perreymond his assistant, also died there in 1858, having been unable to return to France.

Fresnel's notes on the expedition were included in the treatise, Expedition Scientifique En Mésopotamie: Exécutée Par Ordre Du Gouvernement De 1851 À 1854 by Julius Oppert first published in 1858. A detailed report by Maurice Pillet on the travails and eventual unravelling of Fresnel's mission to Babylon was published in 1922.

== Personal life ==
Fresnel was born in Mathieu, Calvados in 1795 and was the youngest of four sons of an architect. He married in 1849 to a Galla (Abyssinian) woman he had bought out of slavery during his time in Egypt. She would remain in Geneva while he led the mission to Mesopotamia.

== See also ==
- Orientalism
- Oriental studies
- The Al-Qurnah Disaster
- Fulgence Fresnel on data.bnf.fr

== Bibliography ==
- Pillet, Maurice (1922). L'expédition scientifique et artistique de Mésopotamie et de Médie, 1851-1855 (in French). Paris: Éditions Champion
- Oppert, Jules; Fresnel, Fulgence; Thomas, Félix (1859–1863). Expédition scientifique en Mésopotamie, exécutée... de 1851 à 1854 (in French). Paris: Imprimerie Imperiale
- Larsen, M.T.(2014) The Conquest of Assyria: Excavations in an Antique Land, Routledge
- H.P. Blavatsky Collected Writings (biography)
- Namio Egami, "The Report of The Japan Mission For The Survey of Under-Water Antiquities At Qurnah: The First Season," (1971–72), 1-45,
- Gustave Vapereau (1858) "Dictionnaire universel des contemporains", Paris, Louis Hachette, 1858, p. 703. (in French)
- France Archives, Fouilles de Fulgence Fresnel en Mésopotamie. 1851-1869. (in French)

== Selected publications ==
- L'Arabie vue en 1837-1838, Paris, Imp. nationale, 1871;
- « Lettre à M. Caussin de Perceval », 27 avril 1850, Journal asiatique, octobre 1850;
- Cinquième Lettre sur l'histoire des Arabes avant l'islamisme à M. Stanislas Julien, Djeddah, février 1838;
- « L'Arabie », dans Revue des deux Mondes, vol. 17, 1839
- Expédition scientifique en Mésopotamie, exécutée… de 1851 à 1854, par MM. Fulgence Fresnel, Félix Thomas et Jules Oppert, publiée par Jules Oppert;
- Extraits d'une lettre de M. Fresnel… à M. Jomard,… sur certains quadrupèdes réputés fabuleux;
- Lettre sur la géographie de l'Arabie;
- Lettre sur la topographie de Babylone, écrite à M. Mohl;
- Lettres sur l'histoire des Arabes avant l'islamisme, 1837;
- Lettres… à M. Mohl;
- Mémoire de M. Fresnel, consul de France à Djeddah, sur le Waday (1848-1850);
- Notice sur le voyage de M. de Wrède dans la vallée de Doan et autres lieux de l'Arabie méridionale;
- Notice sur les sources du Nil, à l'occasion d'une découverte récente;
- Nouvelles et mélanges. Lettre à M. le rédacteur du ″Journal asiatique″, 2 mai 1839;
- Pièces relatives aux inscriptions himyarites découvertes par M. Arnaud, [Signé : Arnaud et F. Fresnel];
- Recherches sur les inscriptions himyariques de San'à, Khariba, Mareb, etc..

== Translations ==
- Jöns Jacob Berzelius, De l'emploi du chalumeau dans les analyses chimiques et les déterminations minéralogiques, translated from Swedish by F. Fresnel, Paris, 1843
