= Nuri Ja'far =

Iraqi psychologist (1914–1991)

- نوري جعفر
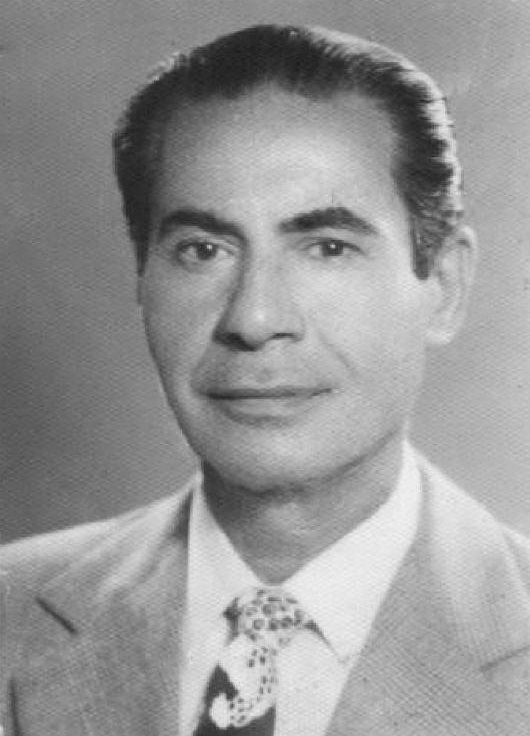
- Jafar c. 1960s
- Born: Nuri Ja'far Ali al-Chalabi; 1914; Al-Qurna, Basra vilayet, Ottoman Empire
- Died: 7 November 1991 (aged 77); Tripoli, Great Socialist People's Libyan Arab Jamahiriya
- Occupations: Psychologist; education philosopher; academic

Academic background
- Education: University of Baghdad, Cairo University, Ohio University
- Website: nourijaffar.com

Nuri Ja'far Ali al-Chalabi (Arabic: نوري جعفر علي الجلبي), better known as Nuri Ja'far (Arabic: نوري جعفر, romanized: Nūrī Jaʻfar; 1914 – 7 November 1991), was an Iraqi psychologist, philosopher of education, and author. He wrote more than fifty works on pedagogy, psychology, history, philosophy, thought and literature. After graduating from the Higher Teachers' House in Baghdad, he went to the United States, and received a master's degree from Ohio University in 1948 and a doctorate in philosophy from the same university in the following year. He was a student of John Dewey and majored in neuropsychology.

In his late years, he moved to Libya to teach at the University of Tripoli, until his death. Although Ja'far died in 1991, controversy about his death has continued by biographers.

== Early years and education ==
=== Life in Iraq ===
Ja'far was born in Al-Qurnah, Basra vilayet. His father, a farmer, and mother, Halimah bint Muhammad Ali Chalabi, were first cousins. Ja'far, referring to his mother, stated that "she was calm, very tolerant, and read the Qur'an, and that was in the 1920s". He also had a brother, Radhi. In 1926, when an elementary school opened in Al-Qurnah, his mother urged his father to enrol him and his brother in the school. The father agreed to enrol only Nuri, not Radhi, because he believed the school would treat Nuri's hyperactivity with punishment. Nuri once stated about his enrolment as follows:

My father took me to the school, and my mother gave me the Qur'an. We entered the interview with a good principal, Mr. Yassin Al-Mulla Huwaysh. My father said: " This is my son, I want to enroll him, and he is reciting the Qur'an." The principal asked me to read... I shivered unbearably so that the Qur'an fell from my hand, I picked it up, kissed it. I opened it not on the appointment, and I didn't look at it, I was shivering. I started reading the verses that I memorized amazingly.... The principal said come near me. He looked and found me holding the Qur'an upside down... He encouraged me, and enrolled me in the second grade.

In school, Ja'far got interested in mathematics, the Arabic language and history. After graduating from high school, he was appointed as a teacher at Al-Qurna Primary School from 18 October 1936 to 31 October 1938. He then worked as an educational inspector from October 1942 until August 1943 in Karbala and Basra. He resigned from the Ministry of Education and was off-duty from 25 October 1943 to 10 January 1950.

=== Higher educations ===
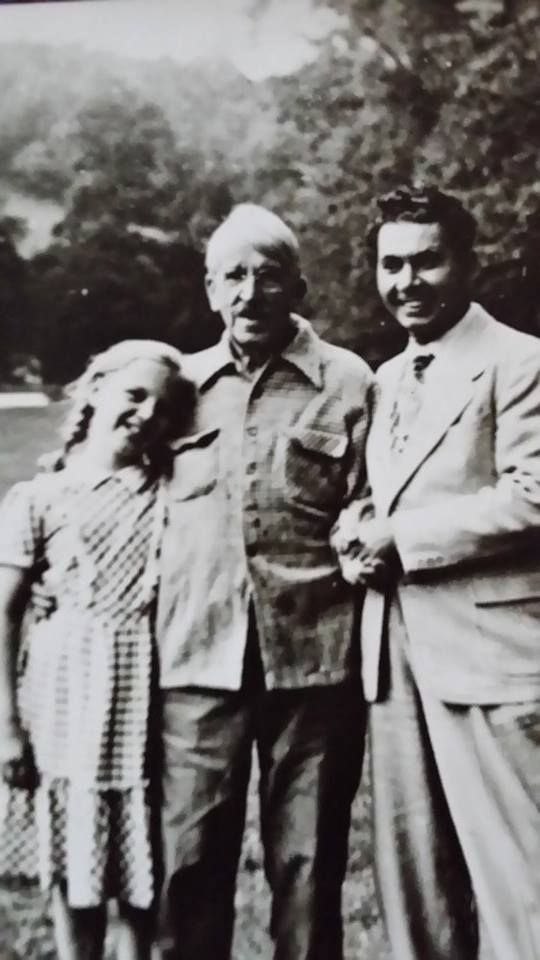
Ja'far with his professor John Dewey, 1949.

He continued his higher education, held the baccalaureate degree and his papers and went to the capital, Baghdad, to the College of Medicine to fulfil his childhood dream, but was denied admission due to financial conditions. After seeing his tattered clothes, the dean, Harry Sinderson, asked if he would be able to spend 5 dinars on his studies once a month. Ja'far replied "Neither I nor my father saw these 5 dinars [in our life]". Sinderson rejected him from the College of Medicine, which prompted him to visit the Higher Teachers' House, where Matti Al-Aqrawi supported in his matriculation and assisted him.

He graduated from the Higher Teachers' House, which later became the University of Baghdad. Even though he wanted to enter the Faculty of Medicine, and said in an interview "if I had to choose – after I got to know my specialty – I would only enter the Faculty of Education, and if I was asked to specialize, I would only specialize in education and psychology, because in fact it's part of me."

After obtaining a bachelor's degree with distinction, he became a teaching assistant at the Higher Teachers' House, then went to Cairo to study at the Higher Education Institute in the 1940s. Then he was able to get a scholarship to the US in 1945 to complete his education there in master's and doctorate degrees after five years. He studied philosophy of education. John Dewey was his professor and friend and colleague in the educational field. He had personal relations with him while Dewey was retired and not his doctoral advisor, he was personally associated with him. Nuri Ja'far used to stay with him at home and discussing with him. He stayed with Dewey in his apartment in New York for a whole month, reading and memorizing his works, and at the time he was an Iraqi prominent scholarship student to the US. He received a master's degree from Ohio University in 1948, and a doctorate in philosophy from the same university in 1949.

== June 1954 Iraqi parliamentary election ==
In 1950, he returned to Iraq and was appointed as director general in the Ministry of Planning from 1959 to 1963, during which time he was researching and writing poetry. He once tried to enter the Iraqi parliament but in what is believed to be an electoral fraud of the June 1954 Iraqi parliamentary election under government of Nuri al-Said, the results of the victory of more than 11 seats for the leftist and democrats were annulled. In the opinion of Tawfiq al-Tamimi, what happened to the Nur Ja'far in the constituency of his city, al-Qurna, is a glaring example of this fraud, "when the government of Nuri al-Said destroyed the ballot boxes that were filled in the name of Dr. Nuri Jaafar, the candidate for his city al-Qurna district, with his leftist colleague Amer al-Hasak and replaced them with their candidates who were not natives of the city". However, Nuri Jaafar did not give up. He continued his protest and criticism, filled the pages with newspapers about the fraud scandal and canceling the elections until he was summoned by the then Prime Minister Arshad al-Umari, and a convulsive dialogue took place between them. Al-Tamimi expressed that Nuri Jaafar was dismissed from his teaching job after this conversation in which Al-Umari asked Jaafar to stop his criticism of the government and exposing the process of electoral fraud, but Nuri Jaafar refused and said: "I will continue to write in the newspapers, to explain the electoral tragedy of Al-Qurna. The government to do whatever it wants." He later wrote a book about this fraud and published it in 1954, Falsification facts of the parliamentary electoral.

== Academic career ==
Upon his return of to Baghdad, from 1950 until 1963 he was a professor at the College of Education (formerly High Teachers House), where he graduated. He was dismissed from his academic career in Iraq after the November 1963 coup d'état. His name was in newly-government list of more than 100 professors in various scientific and humanistic disciplines, arranged by their political views, along with other academics, such as Mahdi Makhzumi, Ali Jawad Al-Taher, Abdul-Jabbar Abdullah and others. According to statement No. 13, Nouri's sequence was No. 4. The list of the statement stipulated to "seizure of their movable and immovable funds." From 1963 to 1991 he taught in the following universities in Saudi Arabia, Libya, Morocco, United Kingdom, Kuwait, Canada and United States: 1964, Professor and Head of the Department of Psychology in the Faculties of Education and Sharia in Umm al-Qura University; 1965–1969, Professor and Head of the Department of Psychology at the Faculty of Arts in University of Benghazi; 1970 – 1973, Professor and Head of the Department of Psychology at the Faculty of Arts in Mohammed V University; 1974, Visiting professor of psychology at the University of Sheffield; 1975 – 1983, Experienced Professor at the College of Education, University of Baghdad; 1977, Professor at the Faculty of Arts, Kuwait University; 1983, Professor at the University of Montreal; 1984, Professor Emeritus at Purdue University; Finally, 1991, Professor of Postgraduate Studies, Department of Psychology at Al-Fateh University.

== Death ==
Although it is widely mentioned that he was killed by a Libyan taxi driver on his way to the Tripoli International Airport to travel to London, his family members who were with him stated that he died one year after the so-called taxi incident. His youngest daughter, Nujood said he died in 1991 at the age of 77 due to a heart ailment:

We were with him, me, Kholoud and my brother Ali, and a few minutes before he fell asleep, he asked us to write on his behalf, and he insisted, "write quickly before I go." After he lay on the bed, Kholoud felt his breathing stopped and became silent, as he had left us.. and I did not understand at the time that he begged us to write because he would leave or he could not leave his science until his last moments.

Nujood states that her father's murder by the Libyan driver is completely unfounded.

Another source stated that he died on 7 November 1991 in Salah al-Din Hospital in Tripoli, Libya, due to complications from the flu, and confirms that everything published about his death of the assassination by a thief is untrue. Kadhim Abbud Fatlawi spoke to one of Ja'far's relatives called Muhammad bin Jassim Al-Chalabi, just stated that he passed in Tripoli, Libya, on 29 Rabi' al-Thani 1412/6-7 November 1991 the same as Kamel Salman al-Jaburi, another Iraqi biographer.

== Personal life ==
Nur Ja'far married later in life to a woman who was 20 years younger than him who came from an upper-class family and died in 1975 in the UK. They had three daughters and one son: Alya', Kholood, Najood (born May 1964) and Ali. Nur Ja'far once described himself "I am the head of a family, a father, a mother, a friend and a loyal guard". In the words of his youngest daughter Nujoud, "My father became our mother and father at the same time, feeling unparalleled tenderness and care to fill the void with our mother's departure in 1975 in an indescribable way, embracing us with his loyal love. He enlisted his life and sacrificed the rest of his life for his knowledge and for us, as he used to repeat to our ears: Your mother left you as a trust."

== Works ==
He wrote more than 50 books in Arabic and English, including:

- Arabic: التربية وفلسفتها، عرض وتحليل ونقد للفلسفة المختلفة, romanized: al-Tarbiyah wa-falsafatuhā : ʻarḍ wa-taḥlīl wa-naqd lil-falsafāt al-mukhtalifah, lit. 'Falsification facts of the parliamentary electoral', 1950
- Arabic: وقائع تزوير انتخابات النواب, romanized: waqāʾiʻ tazwīr intikhābāt al-nuwwab, 1954
- Arabic: التاريخ مجاله وفلسفته, romanized: al-Tārīkh majāluhu wa-falsafatuh, 1954
- Arabic: جون ديوي، حياته وفلسفته, romanized: John Dewey, ḥayātuh wa-falsafatuh, 1954
- Arabic: العلوم الطبيعية؛ دراسة للعوم الفيزيائية والكيميائية والرياضية وأثرها في سير المدينة الحديثة, romanized: al-ʻUlūm al-ṭabīʻīyah : dirāsah ʻāmmah lil-ʻulūm al-fīziyāʼīyah wa-al-kīmiyāʼīyah wa-al-riyāḍīyah wa-atharuhā fī sayri al-madīnah al-ḥadīthah, 1955
- Arabic: علي ومناوئوه, romanized: ʻAlī wa-munāwiʼūh, 1956
- Arabic: فلسفة الحكم عند الإمام, romanized: Falsafat al-ḥukm ʻinda al-imām ʻAlī, 1957
- Arabic: المبادئ والرجال, romanized: al-Mabādiʼ wa-al-rijāl, 1958
- Arabic: الثورة، مقدماتها ونتائجها, romanized: al-Thawrah, muqaddimātuhā wa-natāʼijuhā, 1958
- Arabic: فلسفة التربية, romanized: Falsafat al-tarbīyah, 1959
- Arabic: اقتراحات لتطوير التعليم في العراق, romanized: iqtirāḥāt li-taṭwīr al-taʻlīm fī al-ʻIrāq, 1962
- Arabic: الفكر، طبيعته وتطوره في ضوء علم الحديث, romanized: al-Fikr, ṭabīʻatuhu wa-taṭawwuruh: ṭabīʻat al-insān fī ḍawʼ al-ʻilm al-ḥadīth, 1970
- Arabic: الجهاز المركزي العصبي, romanized: al-Jihāz al-Markazī al-ʻaṣabī, 1971
- Arabic: اللغة والفكر, romanized: ī al-lughah wa-al-fikr, 1971
- Arabic: الأصالة في شعر أبي الطيب المتنبي، أصولها الدماغية وجذورها الاجتماعية في ضوء فسلجة بافلوف, romanized: al-Aṣālah fī shiʻr Abī al-Ṭayyib al-Mutanabbī : uṣūluhā al-dimāghīyah wa-judhūruhā al-ijtimāʻīyah fī ḍawʼ faslajat Bāflūf, 1976
- Arabic: الصراع بين الأمويين ومبادئ الإسلام, romanized: al-Ṣirāʻ bayna al-Umawīyīn wa-mabādiʼ al-Islām, 1978
- Arabic: التقدم العلمي والتكنولوجي ومضامينه الاجتماعية والتربوية, romanized: al-Taqaddum al-ʻIlmi wa-al-tiknūlūjī wa-maḍāmīnuhu al-ijtimaāʻīyah wa-al-tarbawīyah, 1978
- Arabic: طبيعة الإنسان في ضوء فسلجة بافلوف, 1978
- Arabic: الأصالة في مجال العلم والفن, romanized: al-Aṣālah fī majāl al-ʻilm wa-al-fann, 1979
- Arabic: الفکر التربوي الاشتراكي, 1981
- Arabic: الجوانب السيكولوجية في أدب الجاحظ, romanized: al-Jawānib al-sāykūlūjīyah fī adab al-Jāḥiẓ, 1981
- Arabic: آراء ومواقف تربوية ونفسية صائبة في التراث العربي الإسلامي, romanized: Ārāʼ wa-mawāqif tarbawīyah wa-nafsīyah ṣāʼibah fī al-turāth al-ʻArabī al-Islāmī, 1982
- Arabic: دور المؤسسات التربوية في مجال التنمية الاقتصادية في الوطن العربي, romanized: Dawr al-muʼassasāt al-tarbawīyah fī majāl al-tanmiyah al-iqtiṣādīyah fī al-waṭan al-ʻArabī, 1983
- Arabic: الخيال العلمي في أدب الأطفال, romanized: al-khayāl al-ʻilmī fī adab al-aṭfāl, 1985
- Arabic: طبيعة النوم والأحلام في ضوء علوم الدماغ, 1986
- Arabic: مع الحريري في مقاماته, romanized: maʻa al-Ḥarīrī fī maqāmātih, 1986
- Arabic: آفاق تربوية رحبة في التراث العربي الإسلامي, romanized: Āfāq tarbawīyah fī al-turāth al-ʻArabī wa-al-Islāmī, 1987
- Arabic: رعاية الطفل في الأسرة, romanized: riʻāyat al-ṭifl fī al-usrah, 1987
- Arabic: آراء حديثة في تفسير نمو الطفل وتربيته, romanized: ārāʼ ḥadīthah fī tafsīr numuw al-ṭifl wa-tarbiyatuh, 1978
- Arabic: الحب بين القلب والدماغ, romanized: al-Ḥubb bayna al-qalb wa-al-dimāgh, 1987
- Arabic: أدب قصص الخيال العلمي وعالم الأطفال, romanized: adab qiṣaṣ al-khayāl al-ʻilmī wa ʻālam al-aṭfāl, 1987
- Arabic: كتابان بين الجاحظ وجورج برناد شو وجائزة نوبل, romanized: Kitābān : Bayna al-Jāḥiẓ wa-Jūrj Barnārd Shaw. Wa-, Jāʼizat Nūbil, 1990
- Arabic: مجالات التربية الخاصة, 1991

In English:

- The Philosophy of Boyd H. Bode with Special Consideration of Its Meaning for Education in Iraq, 1949
- Creativity and Brain Mechanism, 1976
- Fandamentals of Neuropsychology, 1988
