= Felix Thomas =

French architect and painter

- The archaeological team at Khorsabad, photo by G. Tranchard, 1853
- Born: 1815; Nantes, France
- Died: 1875 (aged 59–60); Nantes, France
- Education: Beaux-Arts
- Known for: Archaeological draftsman, architect, illustrator, painter
- Notable work: Nineveh et Assyria, 1867
- Movement: Orientalist painting and illustration

Félix Thomas (1815–1875) was a French architect and painter.

He was born in Nantes and after graduating from high school Clemenceau, he studied architecture and drafting at the Polytechnique before being admitted to the Beaux-Arts where he studied art under Louis-Hippolyte Lebas. His skills as a draftsman led him to work as project architect on several major archaeological excavations in Mesopotamia and Assyria during the early 1850s. Archaeological work provided opportunities for Thomas to demonstrate his skills as an illustrator and interpreter of historic architectural buildings and he co-authored an important early book on the archaeology of Nineveh in Assyria. He turned to full-time painting in his later life and is noted for works within the Orientalist genre.

== Career ==
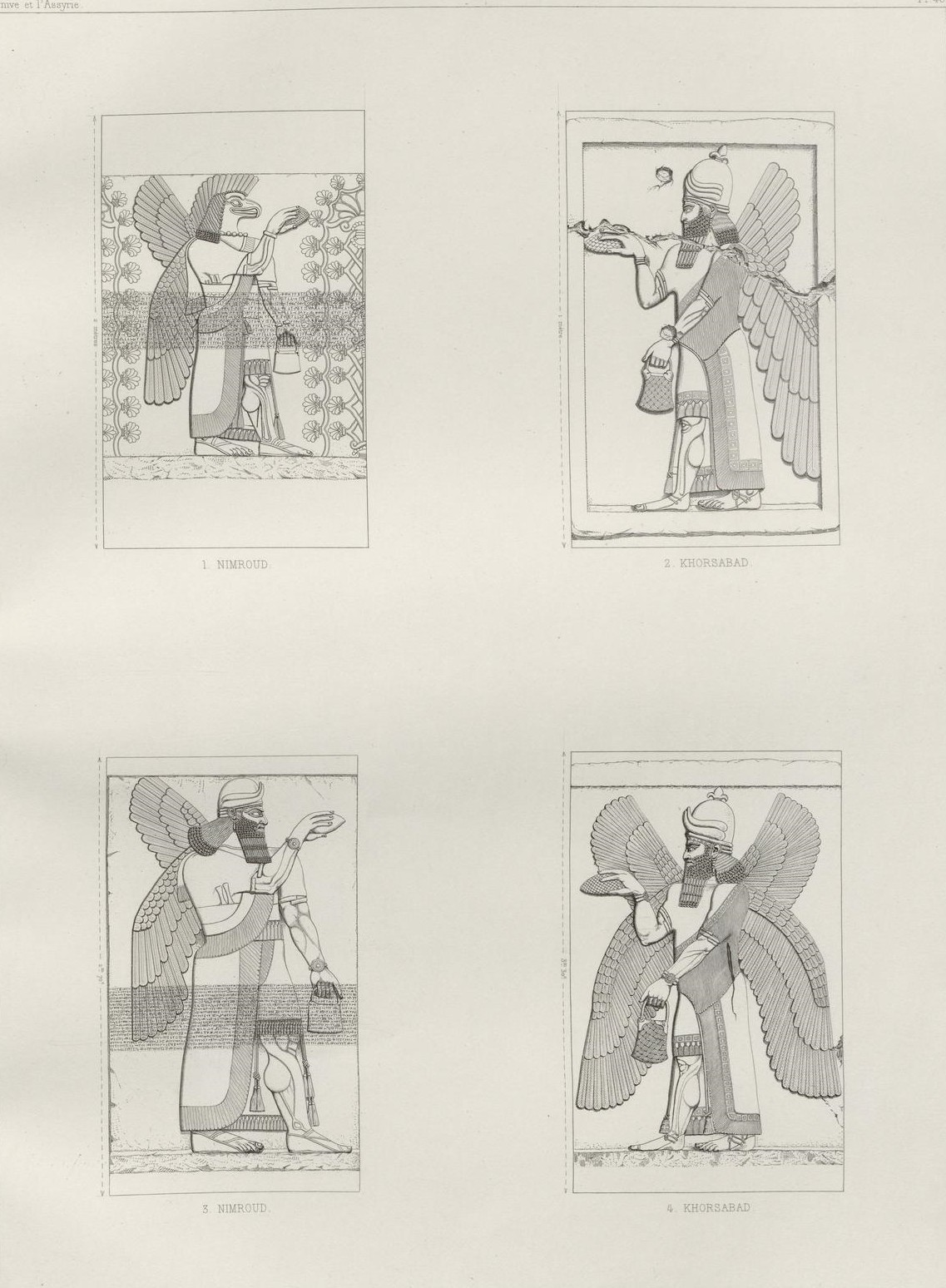
Illustration from the book, Nineveh and Assyria by Victor Place and Felix Thomas, 1867

Initially, Thomas trained as an architect or draftsman at l'Ecole Polytechnique (1834–35). He subsequently studied art at Beaux-Arts where he was a pupil of Louis-Hippolyte Lebas who specialised in the history of architecture. In 1845, Thomas won the first Prix de Rome for a project in Architecture Cathedral. In 1849 he submitted 14 drawings of Neptune's Temple at Paestum which were very well received. In 1850, he travelled to Greece and on his way stopped at Constantinople and Smyrna.

In the early 1850s, Thomas joined several archaeological expeditions in Mesopotamia and Assyria in his capacity as an architect. The first of these expeditions was led by Fulgence Fresnel and Julius Oppert, commencing in 1851. Thomas was expected to describe the monuments and buildings that were discovered as well as to carry out quantity surveys, draw plans, prepare sketches and generally assist with documentation and drawings. He was also required to make casts and stampings of inscriptions, using the new and still secret procedure developed by Lattin de Laval. Due to ill-health, Thomas left Fresnel's Mesopotamian mission prematurely. In spite of that, he still managed to contribute twelve maps to the book of the expedition, Expedition Scientifique En Mésopotamie: Exécutée Par Ordre Du Gouvernement De 1851 À 1854 by Julius Oppert.

After recovering from his illness, Thomas rejoined the archaeological team for the Assyrian excavation in 1852. The excavations, originally started by Paul-Emile Botta in 1843, were languishing, and the French government was determined to mount a large-scale operation in Assyria to showcase its dominance in the region. Victor Place, the new French Consul in Mosul hired Thomas to join the expedition as the project designer. The mission which involved the excavation of the palace of the Assyrian King Sargon II in Khorsabad (formerly Nineveh), would become the first systematic excavation of the site. Thomas made substantial contributions to the success of the excavation through his acute observations, the boldness of his reconstructions and the quality of his drawings which contributed to a rich understanding of the architecture of the Palace.

Many of the Assyrian antiquities were lost in May 1855 when the expedition's boat sank in the Qurnah Disaster on the Tigris, following an attack by local rebels. However, Thomas, who had left earlier, retained his sketches, plans and drawings which subsequently served to illustrate a pioneering text on Assyria and the Palace of King Sargon II entitled Ninevah and Assyria, jointly authored by Victor Place and Felix Thomas in around 1867. In this way, Thomas became a major collaborator and co-author of an important archaeological treatise.

On his return to France, Thomas gave up archaeology and devoted himself to painting. He joined the studio of Charles Gleyre who became his mentor. His travels in Italy, Greece, and Turkey and the Middle East inspired his artistic vision and he began painting works in the Orientalist genre. He enjoyed only modest success in his second career as a painter. Towards the end of his life, he divided his time between his studio in Nantes and Pornic on the Atlantic coast. The Baron de Girardot, in a book dedicated to him, said about him, "Modest to a fault, withdrawn and lonely, he painted for him."

Thomas died in Nantes in April 1875.

== Works ==
Thomas is known for the illustrations provided to several important archaeological texts. In his later life, he produced many fine Oriental paintings. One of his works is on display in the Louvre in Paris.

=== Publications and Illustrations ===
- Twelve of his illustrations were used in Expedition Scientifique En Mésopotamie: Exécutée Par Ordre Du Gouvernement De 1851 À 1854 by Julius Oppert.
- Thomas is co-author (with Victor Place), and illustrator of Nineveh and Assyria, first published in 1867

=== Gallery ===
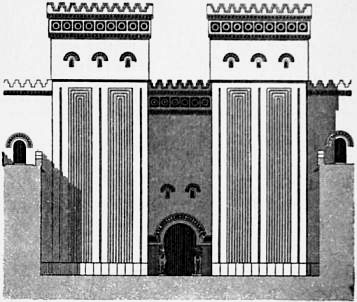
Entrance to the Palace of Khorsabad, illustration by Felix Thomas

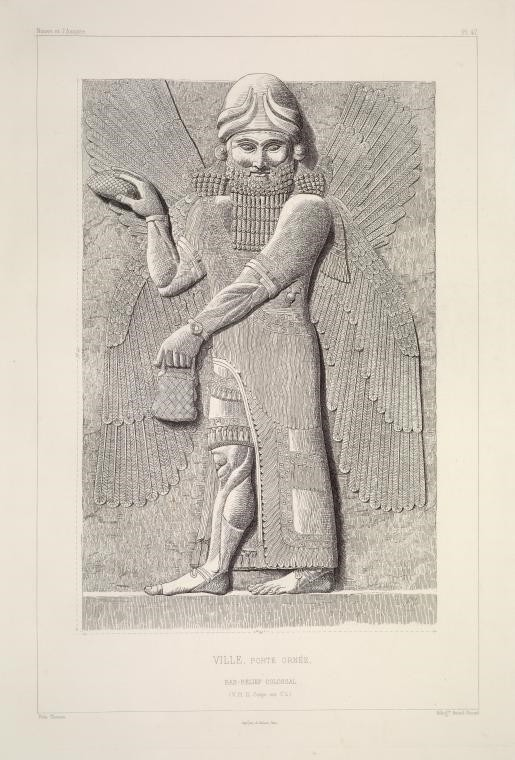
Bass Relief taken from the Palace of Khorsabad

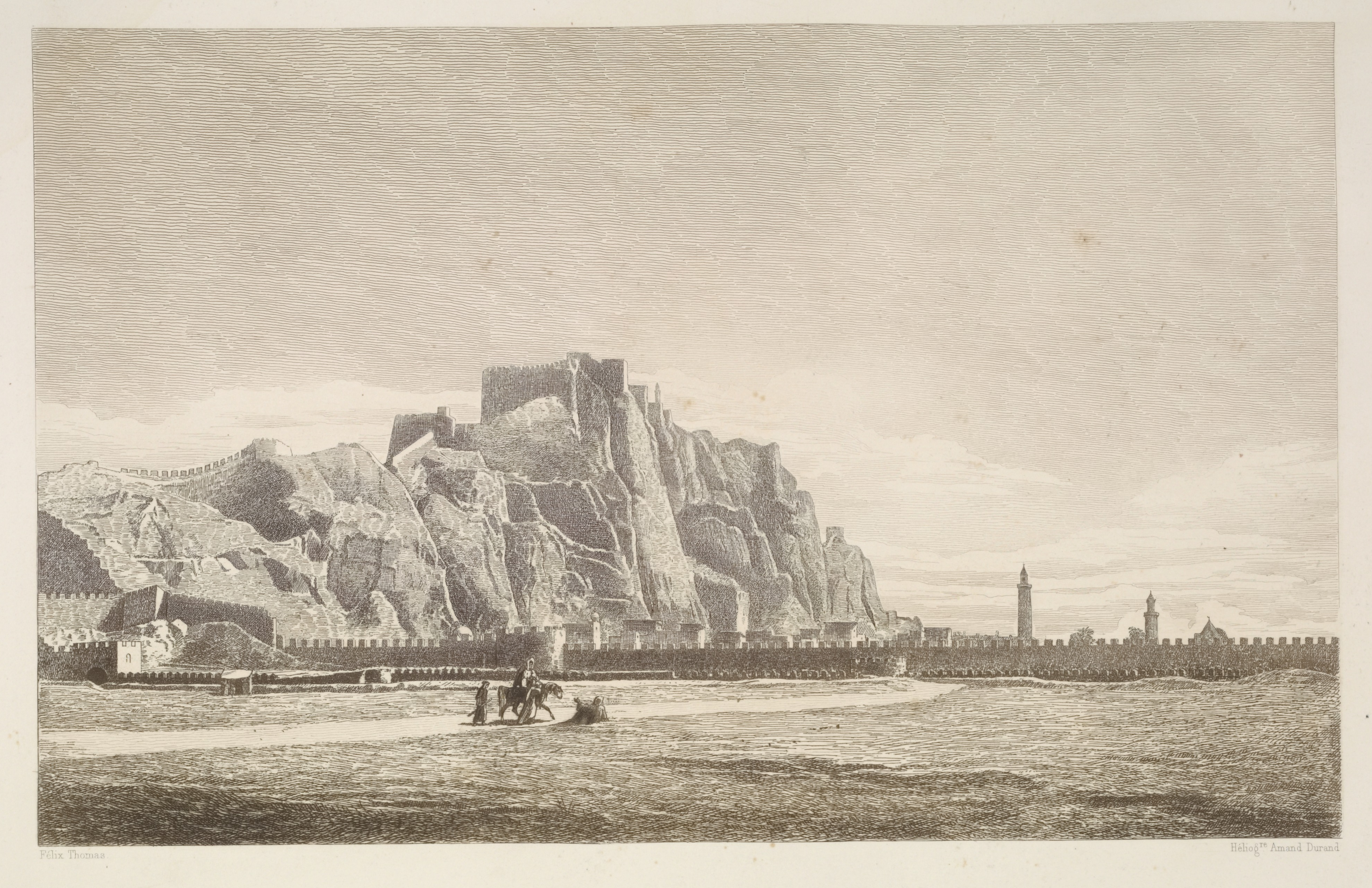
The City of Van, illustration in Ninevah and Assyria, 1867

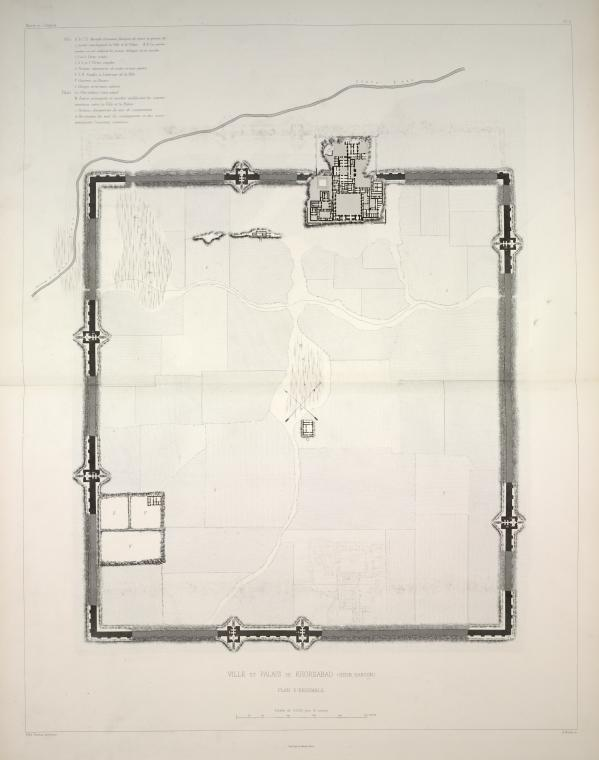
Plan of Khorsabad in Ninevah and Assyria, 1867

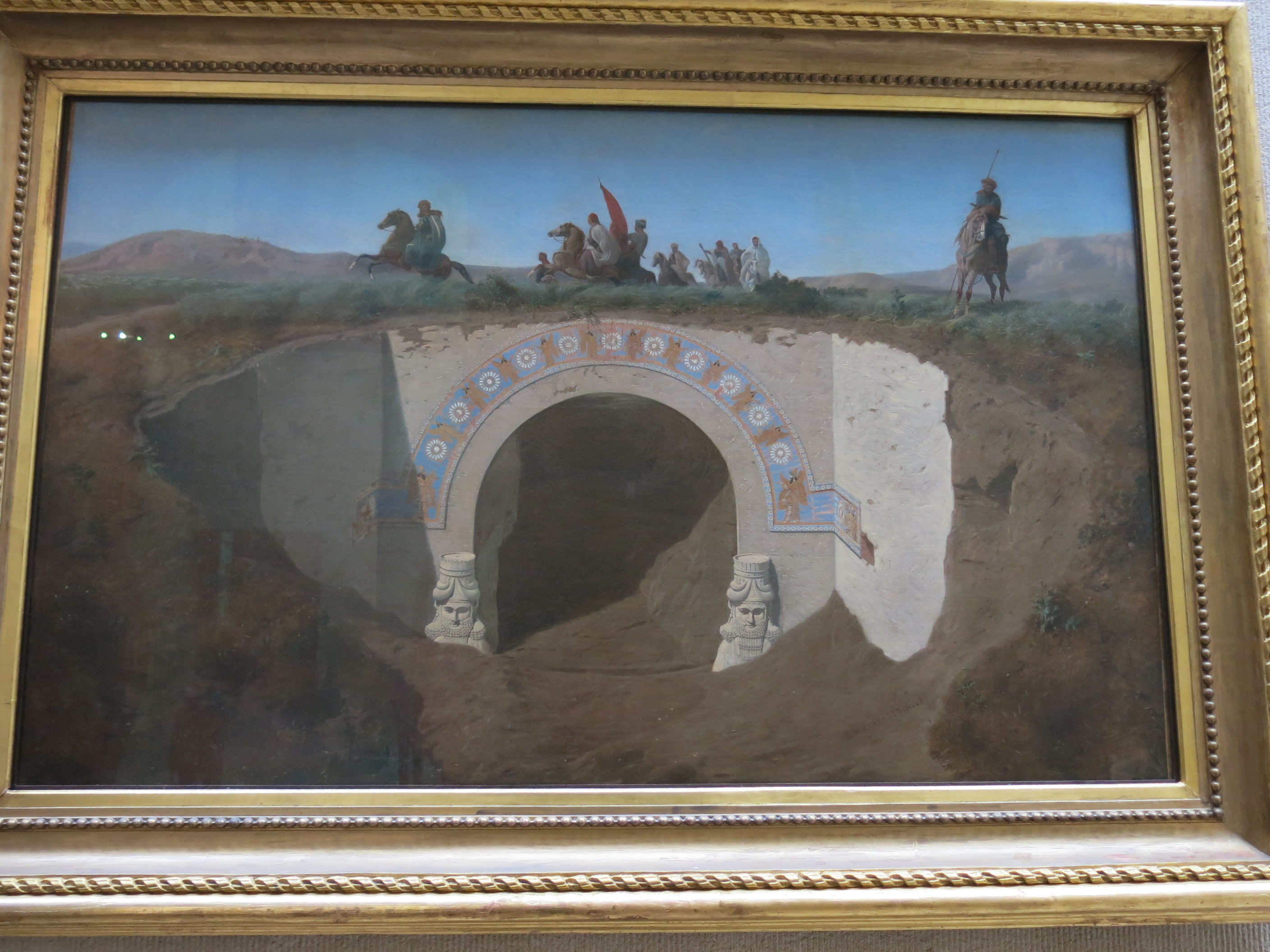
The Pacha visit the Mosul digs, c. 1863

=== Select list of paintings and drawings ===
- The Visit of the Pacha of Mosul to the Excavations at Khorsabad c. 1863 (now in the Louvre, Paris)
- Propylées de l'Acropole de'Athènes, 1859 (Exhibited at the Salon in 1859)
- Sentinelle devant les ruines de Ninive [Sentinel before the ruins of Nineveh], (Private collection)
- Les Pecheurs, n.d.
- Jument et Poulain au Bord, n.d.
- Jeune Femme en Lisière de Forêt, sous les Arbres, n.d.
- La Sentinelle devant les Ruines de Ninive, n.d.

== See also ==
- List of Orientalist artists
- Orientalism
- Orientalism in early modern France
- Oriental studies
