= Al-Qurna District =

Al-Qurna District Arabic: قضاء القرنة
- District
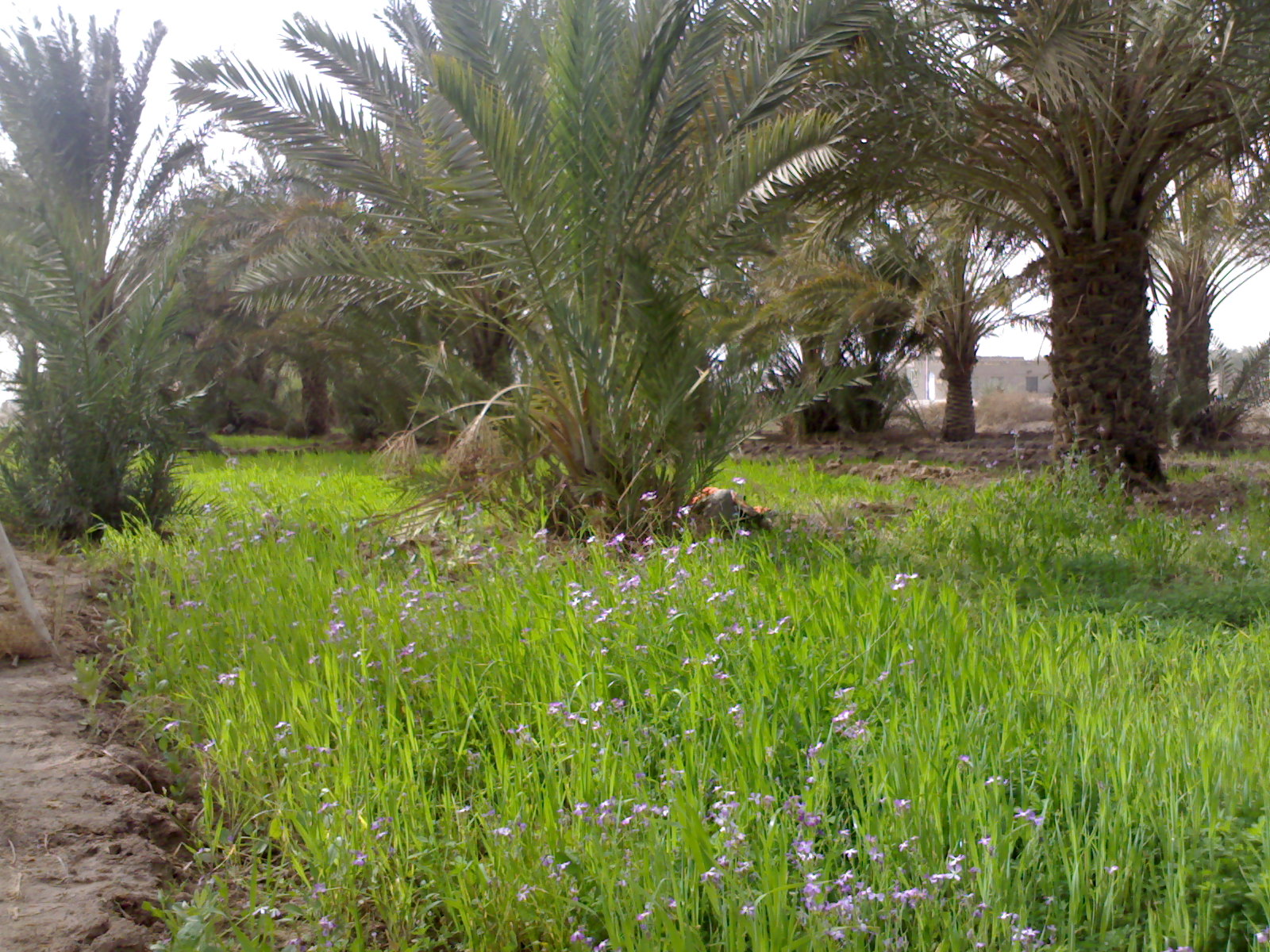
- A farm in the town of Al Qurna

- Location within Iraq
- Coordinates: 30°53′7″N 47°17′27″E
- Country: Iraq
- Governorate: Basra
- Seat: Al-Qurnah

Population (2024)
  - Total: 211,499
- Time zone: UTC+3 (AST)

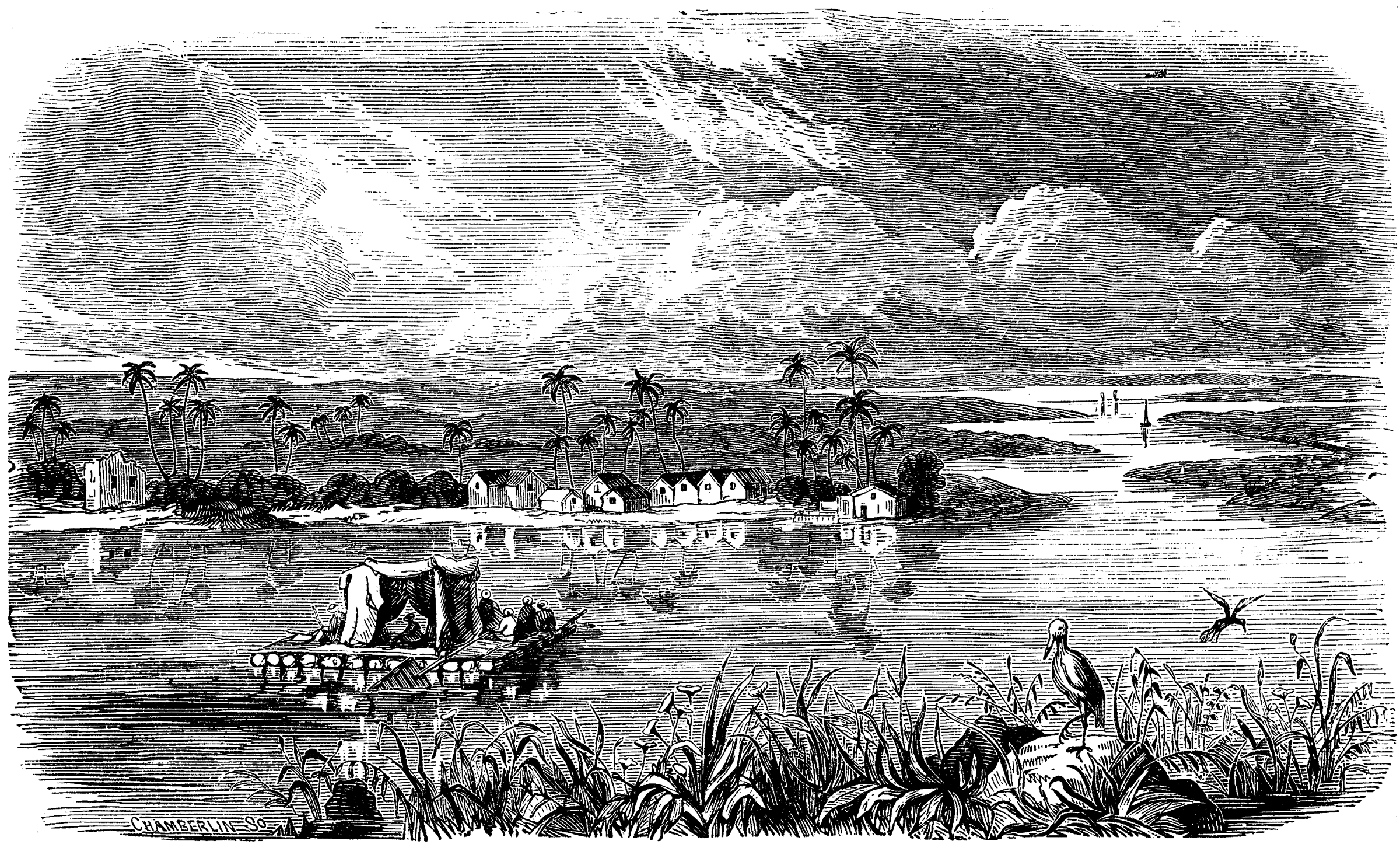
Al Kurnah District historical view

Al-Qurna District (Arabic: قضاء القرنة) is a district of Basra Governorate, Iraq. Its seat is the town of Al-Qurna. The West Qurna Field is located in the district.

The Iraqi marsh lands, which are known as the Garden of Eden, surround this area in the lower part of the Mesopotamian basin. The area had played a prominent part in the history of mankind and was inhabited since the dawn of civilization.
