= HMS Espiegle =

Eight ships of the Royal Navy have borne the name HMS Espiegle

- HMS Espiegle (1793) was a 16-gun French brig-sloop, launched at Bayonne in 1788. Nymphe and Circe captured her off Ushant on 30 November 1793. She was sold in 1802.
- HMS Espiegle (1794) was a French 12-gun aviso launched in 1793 at Saint-Malo. Iphigenia captured her in the Antilles on 16 March 1794. (Note: Both Demerliac and Winfield confuse the captor of this vessel with the captors of Espiegle (1793). The National Maritime Museum database and Winfield and Roberts have the correct attribution.) She was commissioned under Lieutenant John Fishley. The Navy sold her in 1800.
- HMS Espiegle (1804) was a 16-gun sloop, formerly the civilian vessel Wimbury (or Wembury), launched at Barnstaple in 1803. The Admiralty purchased her in 1804 and sold her in 1811 for breaking up.
- HMS Espiegle (1812) was an 18-gun Cruizer-class brig-sloop launched in 1812 and sold in 1832.
- HMS Espiegle (1844) was a 12-gun brig launched in 1844 and sold in 1861.
- HMS Espiegle (1880) was a Doterel-class composite screw sloop launched in 1880. She became a boom vessel in 1899, was renamed HMS Argo in 1904 and was sold in 1921.
- HMS Espiegle (1900) was a Cadmus-class sloop launched in 1900 and sold in 1923.
- HMS Espiegle (J216) was an Algerine-class minesweeper launched in 1942 and broken up in 1967.

A gun-boat named Espiegle served in the navy's Egyptian campaign between 8 March and 2 September 1801. Her officers and crew qualified for the clasp "Egypt" to the Naval General Service Medal, which the Admiralty issued in 1847 to all surviving claimants.
