= Julius Oppert =

French-German Assyriologist

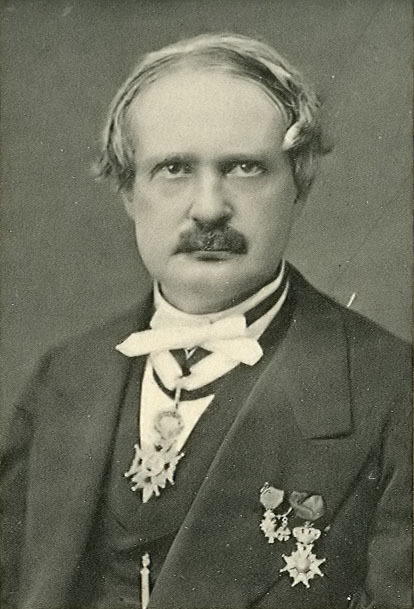
Julius Oppert

Julius (Jules) Oppert (9 July 1825 – 21 August 1905) was a French-German Assyriologist, born in Hamburg of Jewish parents.

== Career ==
After studying at Heidelberg, Bonn and Berlin, he graduated at Kiel in 1847, and the next year went to France, where he was a teacher of German at Laval and at Reims. His leisure was given to Oriental studies, in which he had made great progress in Germany.

In 1851 he joined the French archaeological mission to Mesopotamia and Media under Fulgence Fresnel. On his return in 1854, he was naturalized as a French citizen in recognition of his services. He occupied himself with analyzing the results of the expedition, with special attention to the cuneiform inscriptions he had collected. His account of the Fresnel mission and the results of his consequent study were published as Expédition Scientifique en Mésopotamie (1859–1863), with the second volume entitled Déchiffrement des inscriptions cunéiformes. The work was especially notable as most of the mission's excavations were lost in the Al Qurnah disaster.

In 1855 he published Écriture Anarienne, advancing the theory that the language spoken originally in Assyria was Turanian (related to Turkish and Mongolian), rather than Aryan or Semitic in origin, and that its speakers had invented the cuneiform writing system. Although the classification of the "Casdo-Scythian" inscriptions as Turanian would later be rejected by scholars, research would confirm Oppert in his identification of the distinctness of the Sumerian language (as he renamed it in 1869) and the origin of its script.

In 1856 he published Chronologie des Assyriens et des Babyloniens.

In 1857 he was appointed professor of Sanskrit and comparative philology in the school of languages connected with the National Library of France, and in this capacity he produced his Grammaire Sanscrite (1859). But his attention was chiefly given to Assyrian and cognate subjects.

In 1865 he published a history of Assyria and Chaldaea (Histoire des Empires de Chaldée et d'Assyrie) in the context of new archaeological findings. His Assyrian grammar, Éléments de la grammaire assyrienne, was published in 1868. In 1869 Oppert was appointed professor of Assyrian philology and archaeology at the College de France.

In 1876 Oppert began to focus on the antiquities of ancient Media and its language, writing Le Peuple et la langue des Médes (1879).

In 1881 he was admitted to the Academy of Inscriptions and in 1890, he was elected to its presidency. He was elected to the American Philosophical Society in 1891.

He died in Paris on 21 August 1905.

== Bibliography ==
Oppert was a voluminous writer upon Assyrian mythology and jurisprudence, and other subjects connected with the ancient civilizations of the East. Among his other works may be mentioned:

- L'Immortalité de l'âme chez les Chaldéens, (1875)
- Salomon et ses successeurs (1877)
- Doctrines juridiques de l'Assyrie et de la Chaldée (1877, with Joachim Menant).

A list of his articles may be found in Muss-Arnolt, "The Works of Jules Oppert", in Delitzsch and Haupt, Beiträge zur Assyriologie, ii.523-556, Leipzig, 1894.

== See also ==
- Felix Thomas
- Fulgence Fresnel
- Orientalism in early modern France
- Orientalism
- Oriental studies
