= Al-Qurnah =

Al-Qurnah القرنة
- City
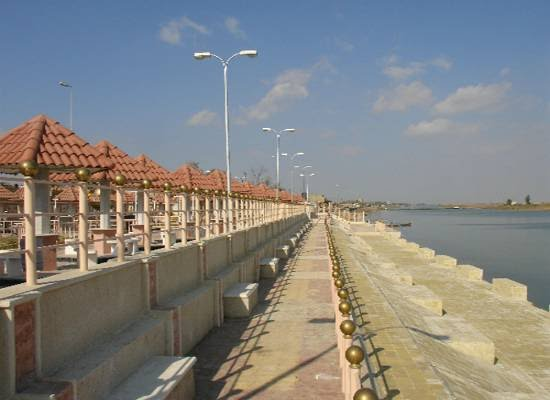
- Al-Qurnah on the Tigris and Euphrates

- Location within Iraq
- Coordinates: 31°0′57″N 47°25′50″E
- Country: Iraq
- Governorate: Basra Governorate
- District: Al-Qurna District
- Elevation: 13 ft (4 m)

Population (2018)
  - Total: 286,073
- District total
- Time zone: UTC+3 (GMT +3)
  - Summer (DST): UTC+4 (GMT +4)

Al-Qurnah (Kurnah or Qurna, meaning connection/joint in Arabic) is a town in southern Iraq about 74 km northwest of Basra, that lies within the conglomeration of Nahairat. Qurna is located at the confluence point of the Tigris and Euphrates rivers to form the Shatt al-Arab waterway. Local folklore holds Qurnah to have been the original site of biblical paradise, the Garden of Eden, and location of the Tree of Knowledge.

== History ==
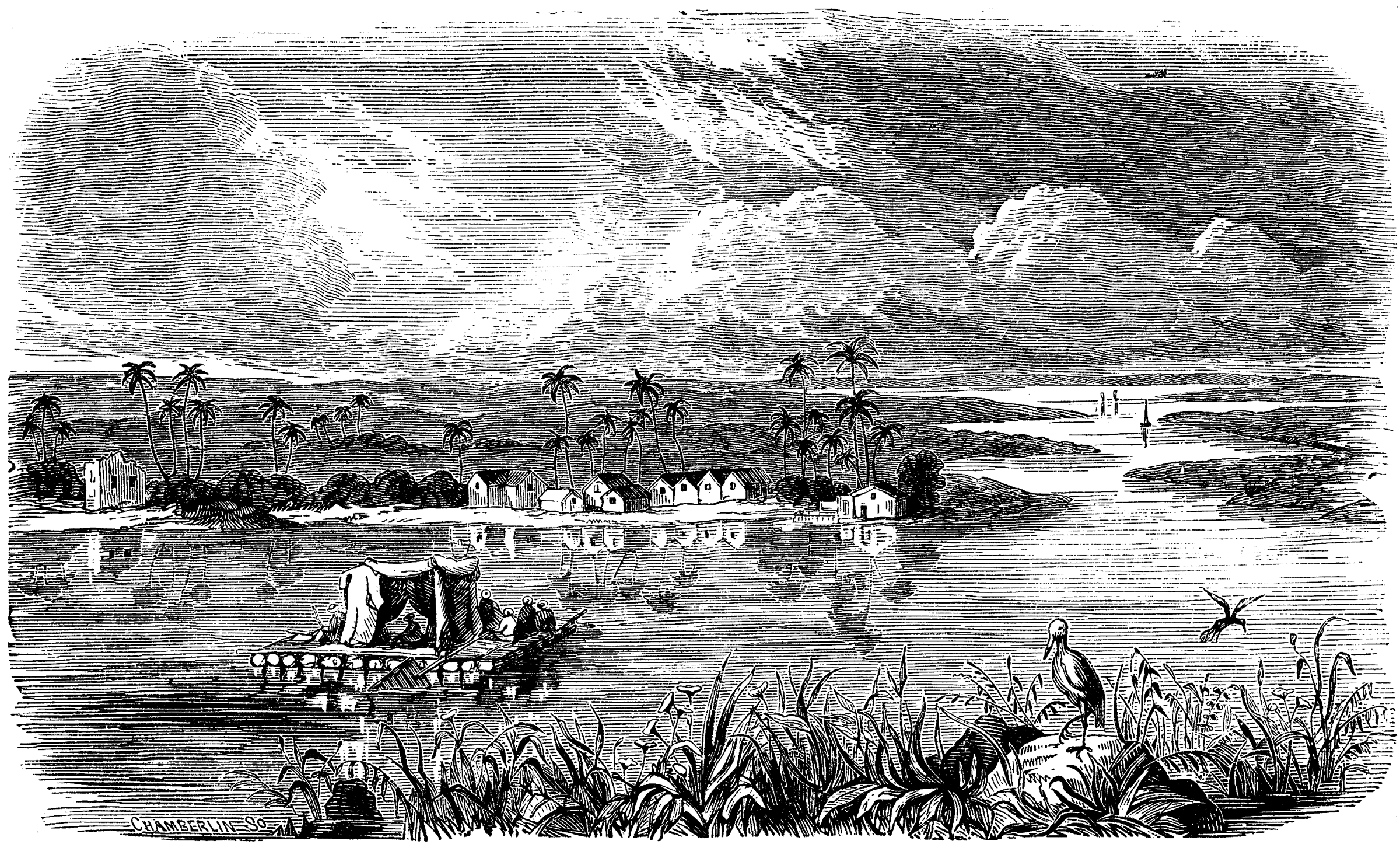
View of Al-Qurnah in 1885 (Ridpath)

Local folklore holds Qurnah to have been the site of the Garden of Eden and the location of a city built by general Seleucus Nicator I. An ancient tree is celebrated locally and shown to the tourists as the actual Tree of the Knowledge of Good and Evil of the Bible. The tree died some time ago and replacement trees were planted. The tomb of Ezra is also described to be nearby and found further upstream on the river Tigris.

In 1855, Al Qurnah was the site of the Qurnah Disaster, in which local tribes attacked and sank a convoy of a ship and rafts carrying 240 cases of antiquities discovered by Victor Place's mission to Khorsabad, Rawlinson's to Kuyunjik and Fresnel's to Babylon. The loss of priceless antiquities was a notable disaster for those researching the antiquities of the region. Subsequent efforts to recover antiquities lost in the Qurnah Disaster, including a Japanese expedition in 1971-2, were largely unsuccessful.

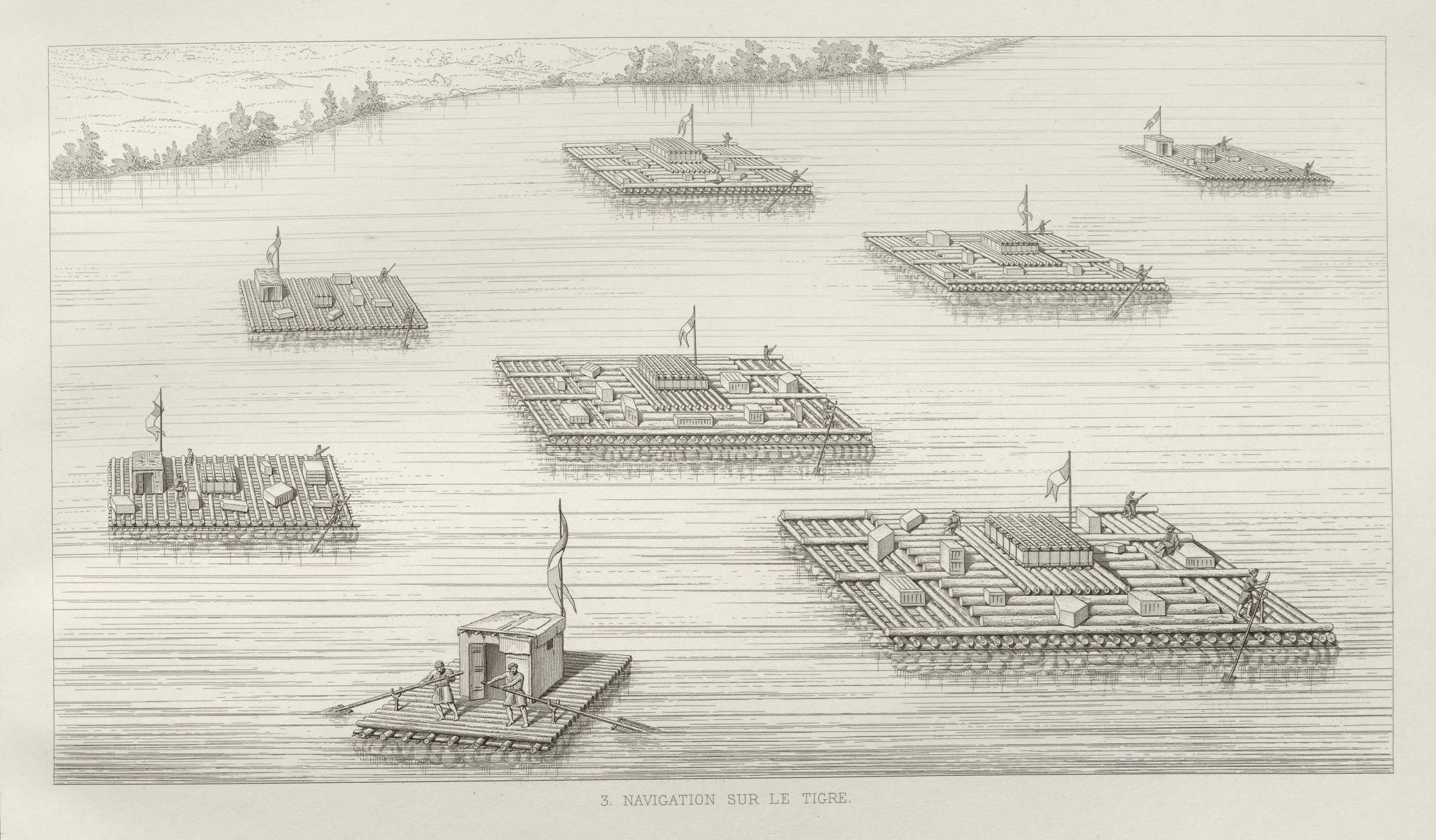
River rafts loaded with antiquities floating down River Tigris (V Place, 1867)

The town experienced the Battle of Qurna during the Mesopotamian Campaign of World War I, when the British defeated Ottoman troops who had retreated from Basra in 1914. The Battle of Qurna secured the British front line in Southern Mesopotamia, thereby protecting Basra and the oil refineries at Abadan in Persia (now Iran).

In 1977, Thor Heyerdahl sailed a reed boat from Al-Qurnah to show that migration between Mesopotamia with the Indus Valley civilization was possible. The voyage proved complicated because of the wars in the region and the vessel was eventually lost off Djibouti.

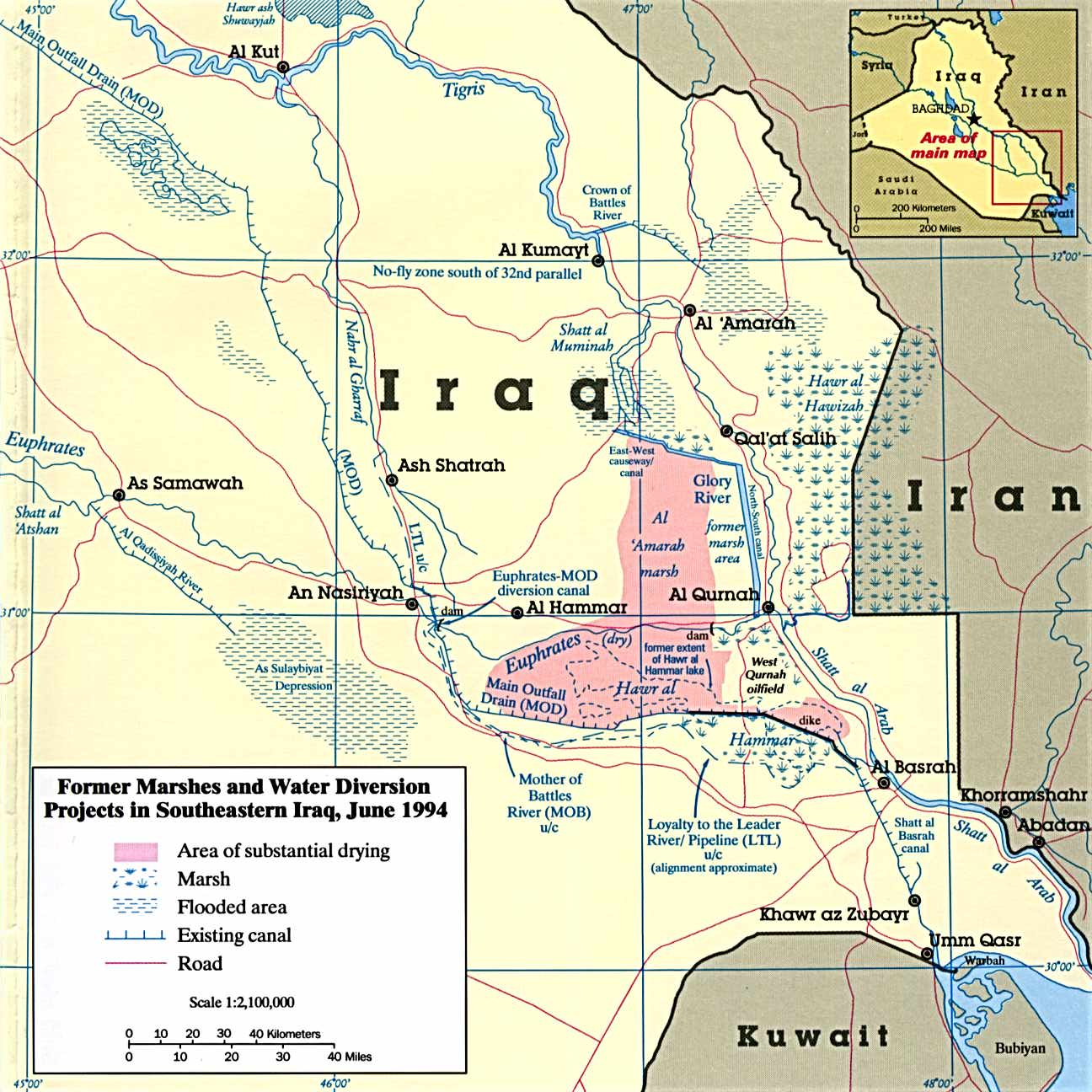
1994 map of the Al Qurnah area showing drainage of Marshes

After the First Gulf War (1991), the Iraqi government under Saddam Hussein diverted river water away from the local marshes, causing them to become completely desiccated. The wetlands have since shrunk to 58% of their pre-drainage area and are projected to drop below 50%. This loss has also been a result of Turkish and Iranian damming of the Tigris and Euphrates rivers. The UN has reported that the combined volume of these rivers has been reduced by 60%. These developments are said to have made the area more vulnerable to degradation and desertification.

== Recent developments ==
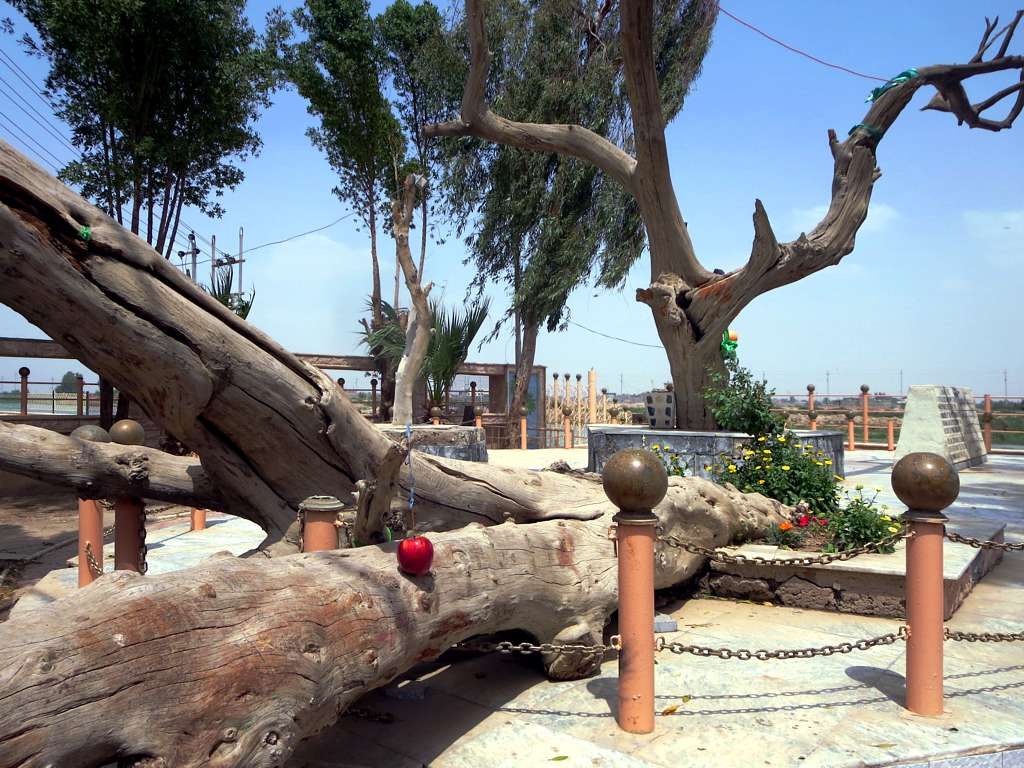
Al Qurnah is said to be location of the Tree of the Knowledge of Good and Evil.

The river front Qurnah Tourist Hotel was built during the Ba'athist period to encourage tourism for the region.

Majnoon Island near Al-Qurnah is a center for oil production of the giant Majnoon Oilfield. The area was built out of sand dunes and mud to create pathways for oil pipelines. The island was held by Iranian army during the Iran-Iraq war before Iraqi chemical weapons were deployed.

As of the start of the 2003 US invasion of Iraq, conditions of the city were already reportedly woeful. Cracked pavements and bullet holes in local properties, the looting of the local hospital and the poor condition of the tree of the knowledge of good and evil made the return of tourism to the area challenging. The local economic, environmental and social conditions in Al-Qurnah district have since been described as fragile.

== Notable people ==
- Nuri Ja'far (1914 – 7 November 1991), psychologist and philosopher of education.

== Gallery ==
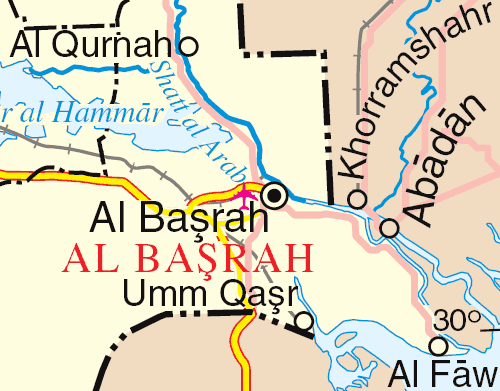
Basra area map.

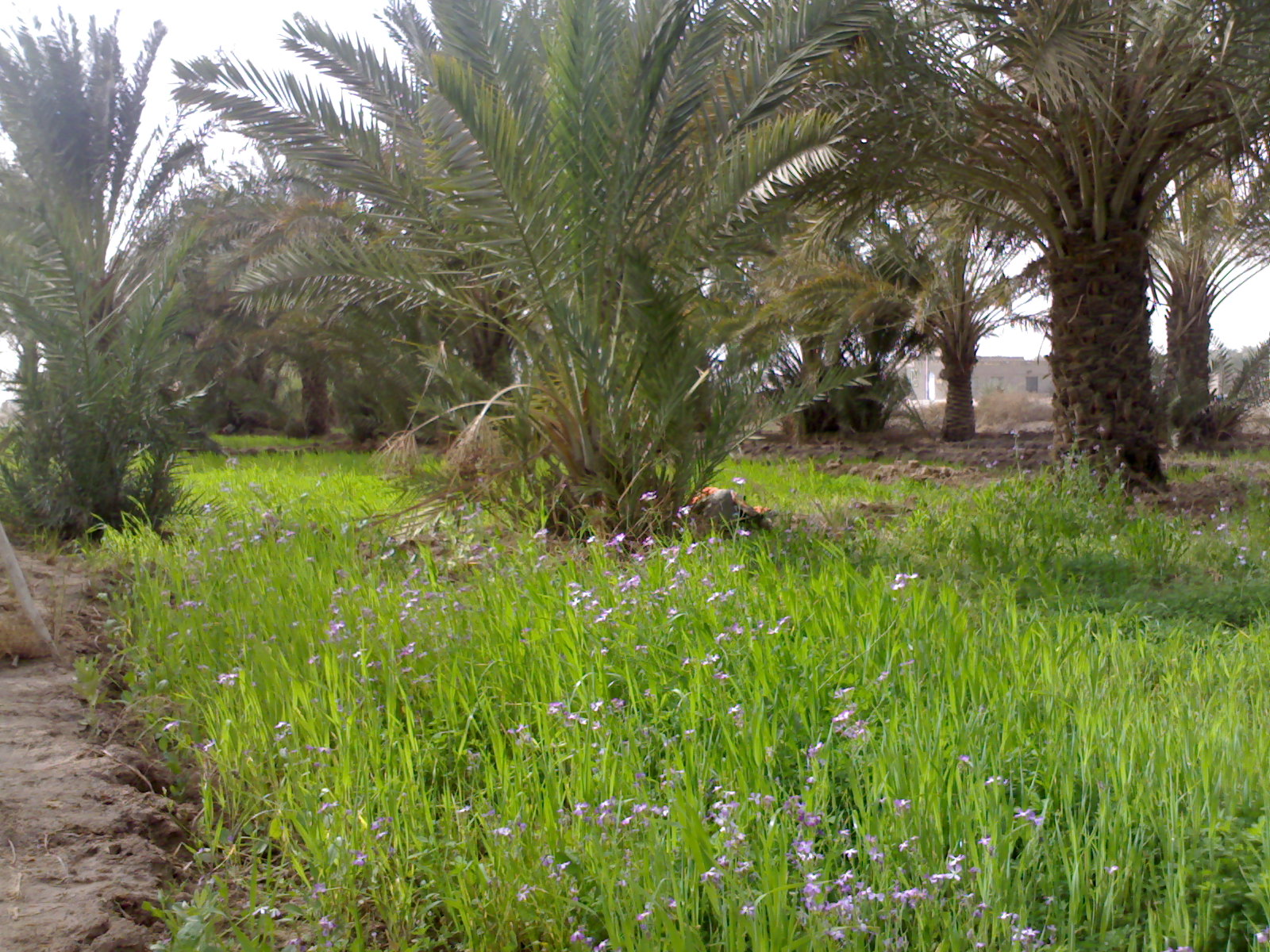
Farm outside Al Qurnah

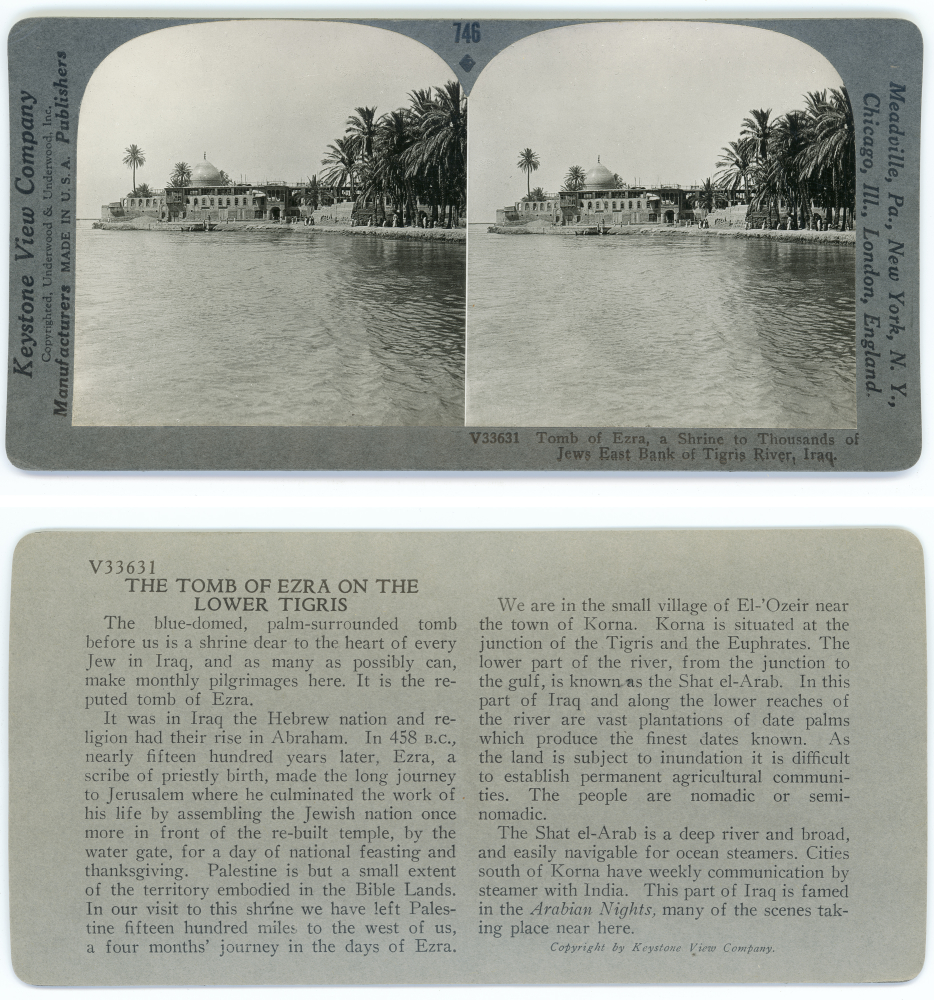
Shrine in Al Qurnah

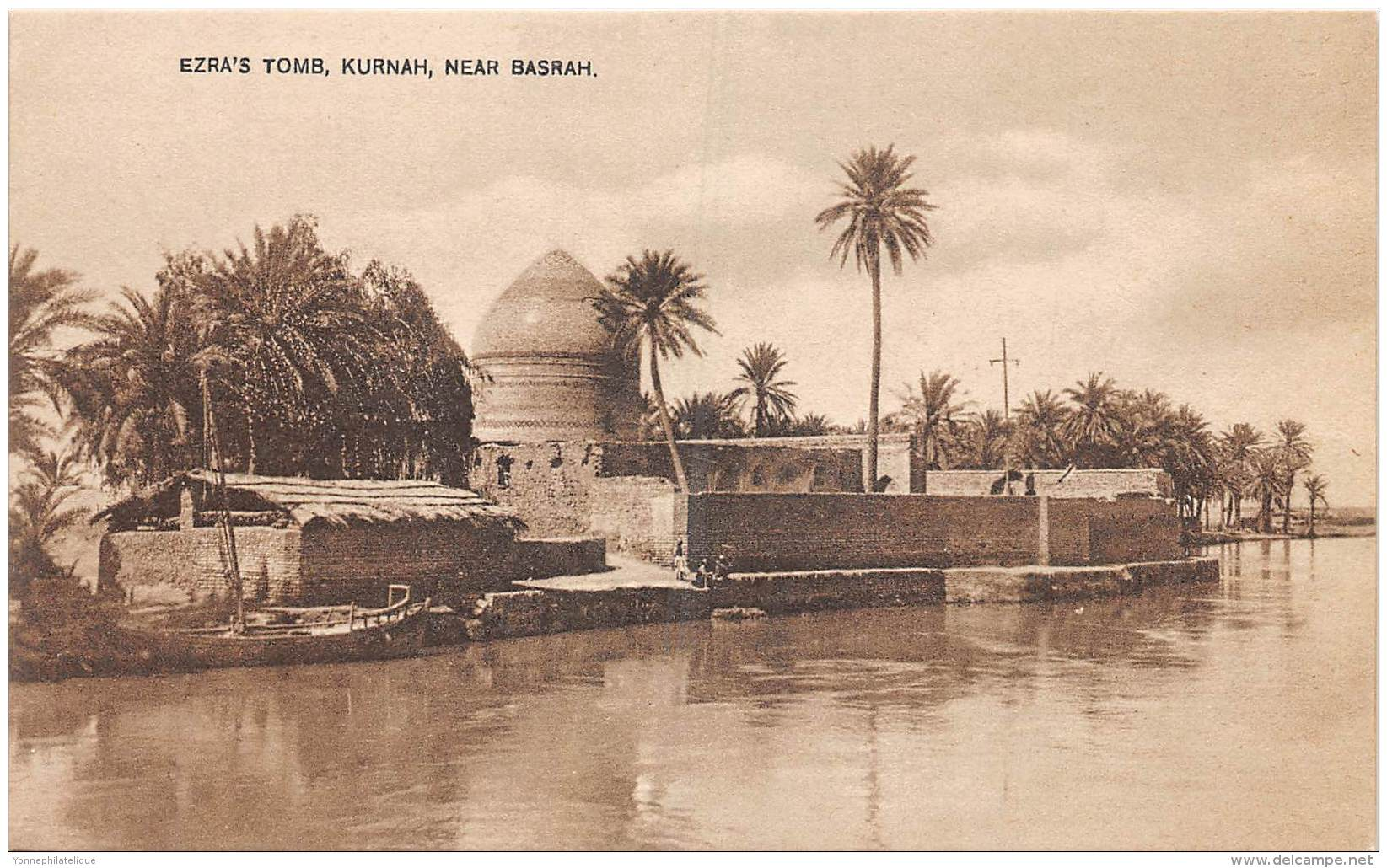
Ezra's Tomb in Kurnah

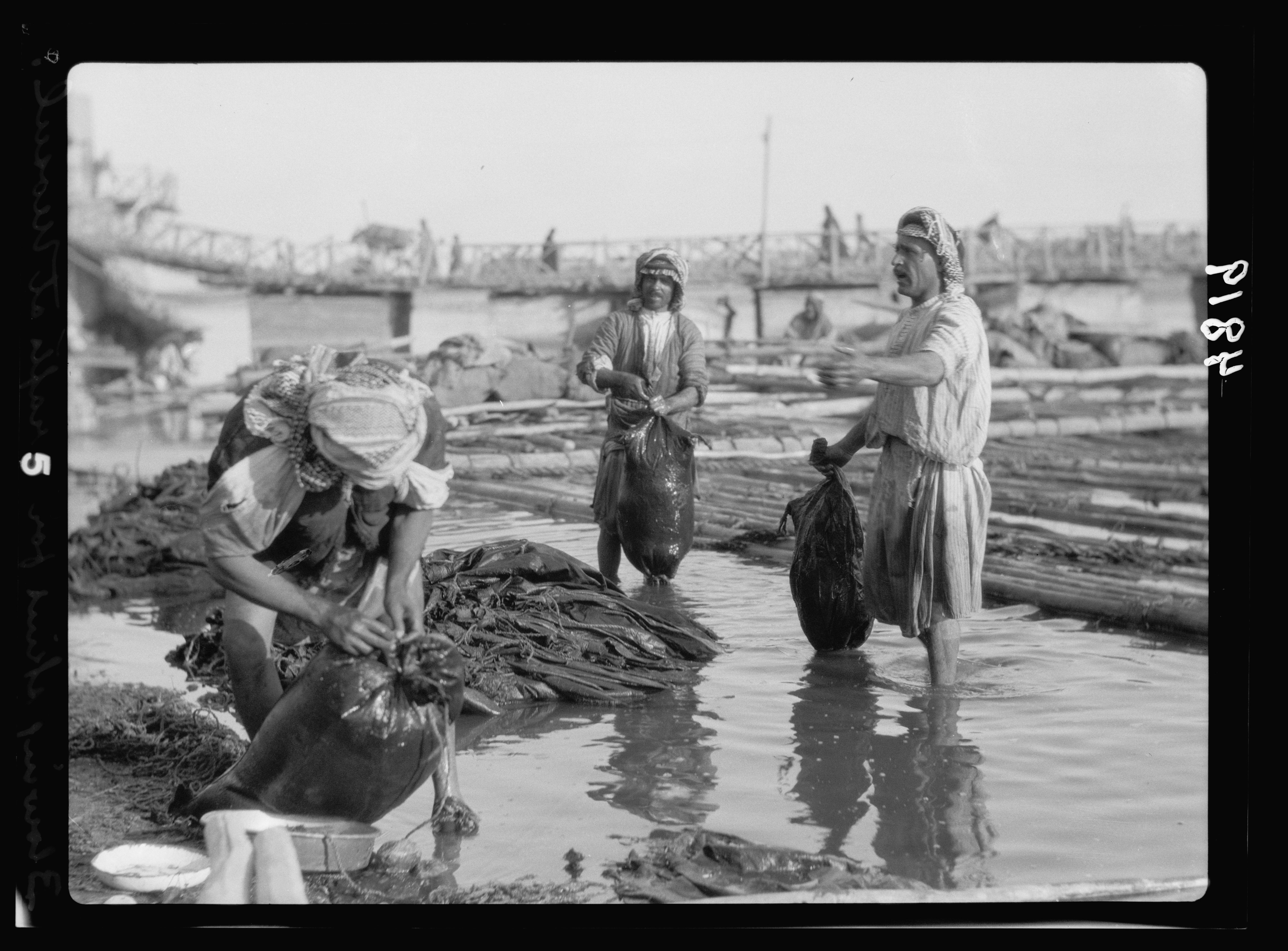
Rafts used for transport on the River Tigris

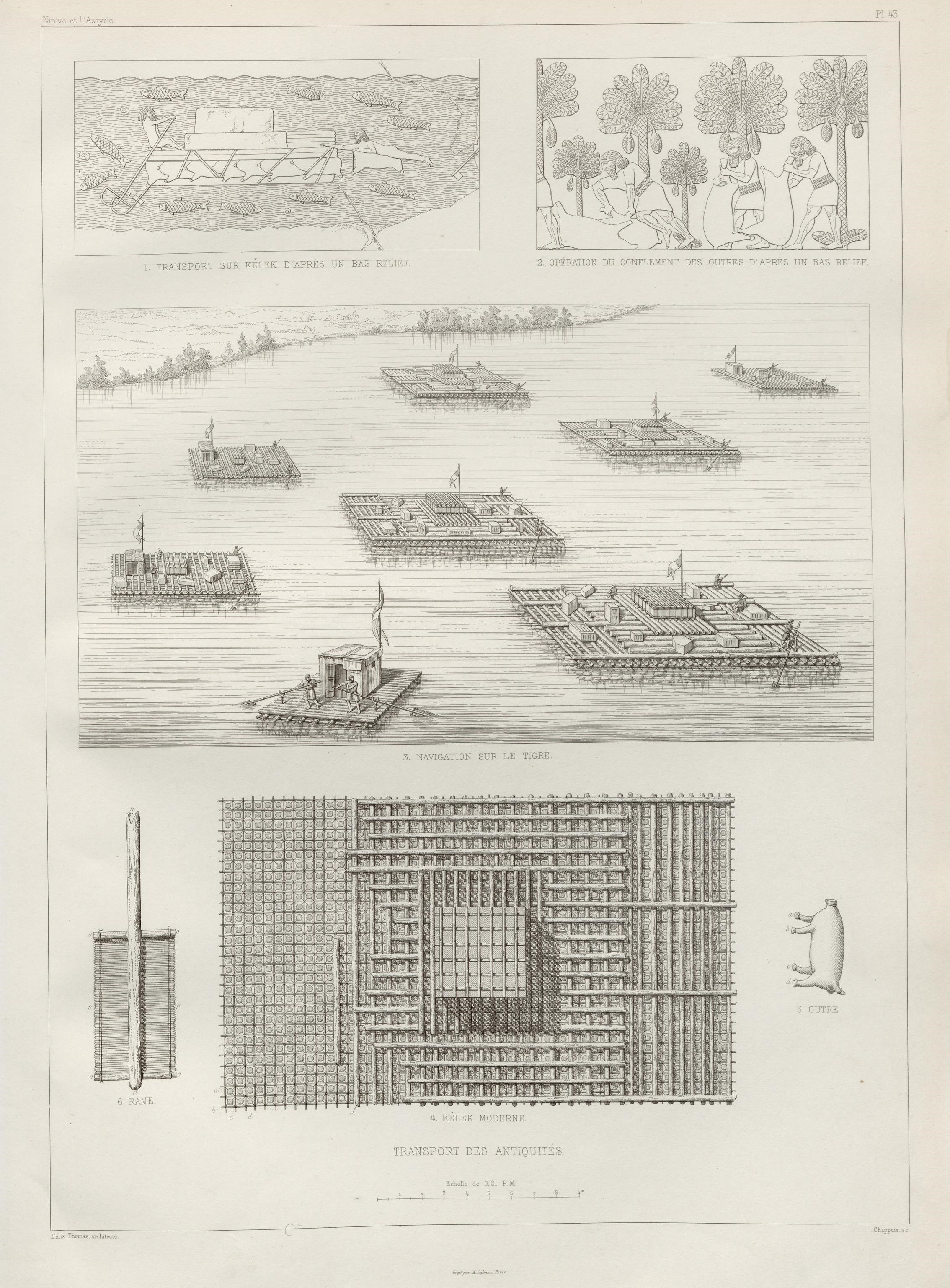
Depiction of rafts (Keleks) loaded with antiquities that sank near Al Qurnah in 1855 (Victor Place, 1867)

== See also ==
- Qurnah Disaster
- Battle of Qurna (1914)
- Operation Kheibar (1984)
- West Qurna Oil Field
- Draining of the Mesopotamian Marshes
- Ezra's Tomb
