= Mausoleum of Kumayl ibn Ziyad =

Shrine of a companion of Ali ibn Abi Talib in Najaf Province, Iraq

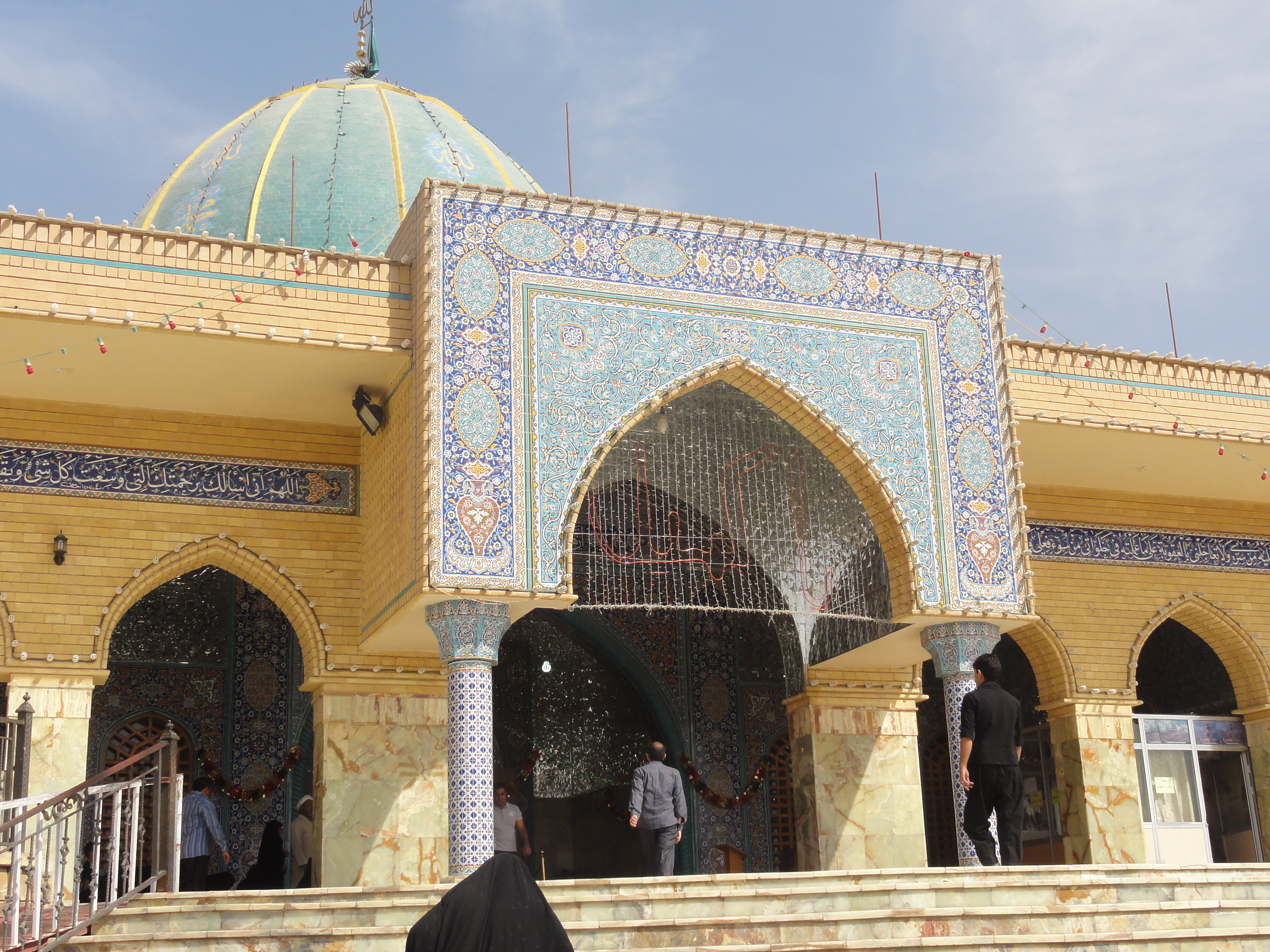

Religion
- Affiliation: Shi'a
- Province: Najaf province

Location
- Location: Najaf-Kufa metropolis, Iraq
- Interactive map of Mausoleum of Kumayl ibn Ziyad
- Coordinates: 32.006861°N 44.338920°E

Architecture
- Type: mausoleum
- Style: Modern
- Completed: 1950
- Dome: 1

The Mausoleum of Kumayl ibn Ziyad (Arabic: ضريح كميل بن زياد) is a shrine dedicated to Kumayl ibn Ziyad al-Nakha'i, a companion of the fourth Rashidun Caliph, Ali ibn Abi Talib. It is located on the metropolis of Najaf and Kufa, Iraq, adjacent to the Al-Hannanah Mosque.

== History ==
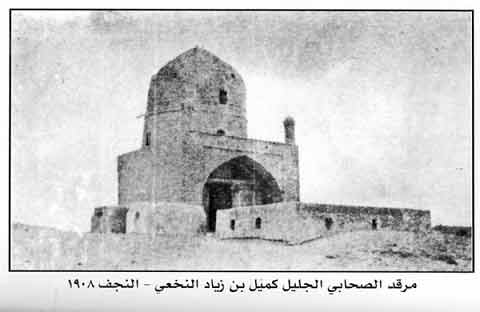
The original shrine building in the 1950s.

Kumayl ibn Ziyad was buried at the site after his killing at the hands of Al-Hajjaj ibn Yusuf, and a shrine was built over his grave. The shrine was first built in 1950 by Sheikh Ali al-Baghdadi, the custodian of the Imam Ali Shrine who ordered its construction. The place was subsequently expanded in the 1970s. The dome over the shrine was replaced in 2000 after a merchant, Hajj Abdul-Husayn al-Saraf, funded a restoration of the shrine. Then in 2007, the government of Najaf donated a sum of money to expand and repair the shrine. The courtyard of the shrine was reconstructed in 2009 and the drainage systems were repaired as well.

== Architecture ==
The shrine is a modern structure, the original building dating back to 1950. The dome of the shrine is covered with Qashani tiles which have the names of the 12 Imams inscribed on them. The grave of Kumayl is located underneath the dome, and aside from the Kumayl, the shrine also contains the graves of some other companions of Ali ibn Abi Talib. The floor and walls of the shrine are covered with Italian alabaster.

== Gallery ==
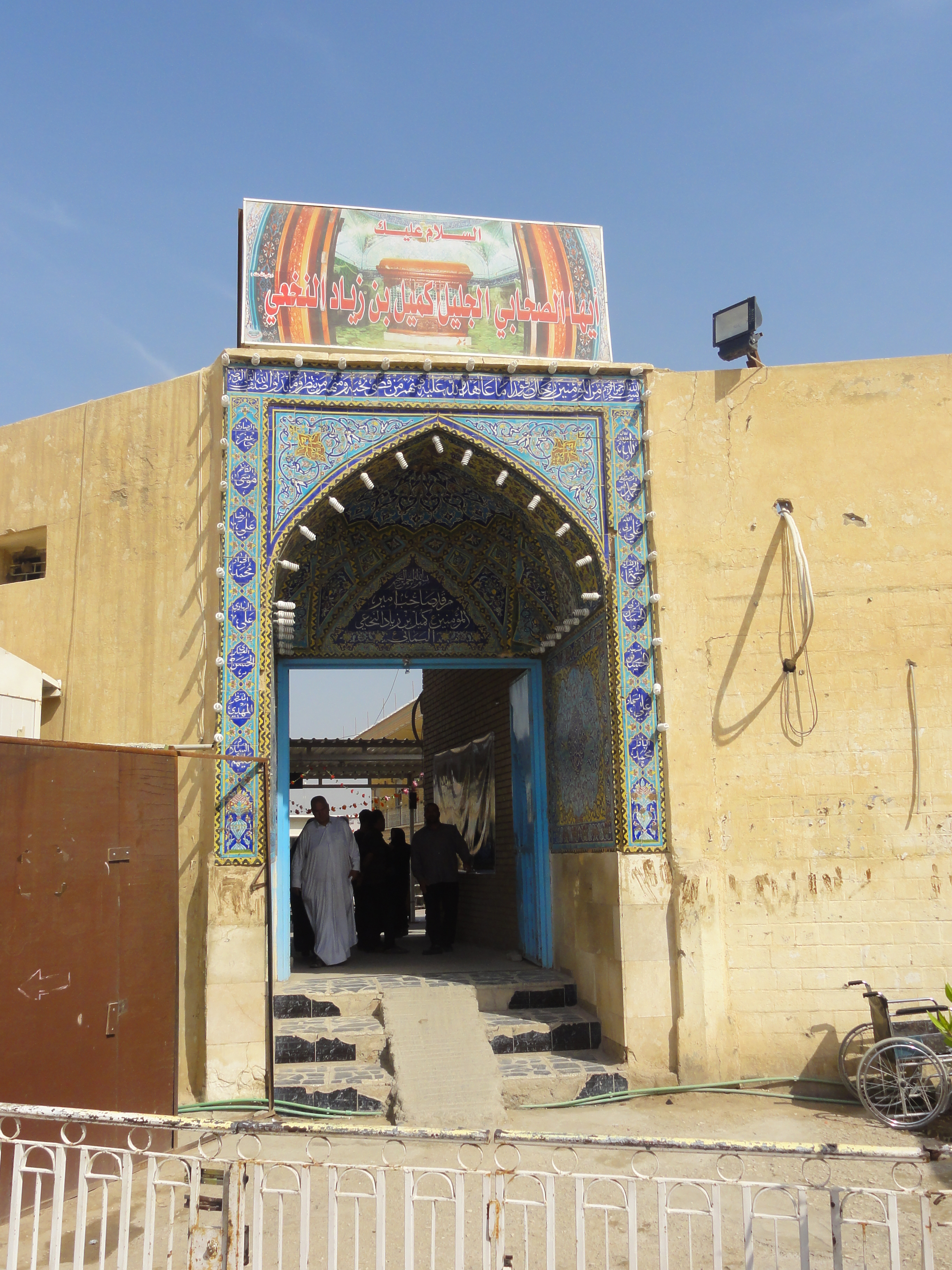
Entrance to the shrine of Kumayl ibn Ziyad

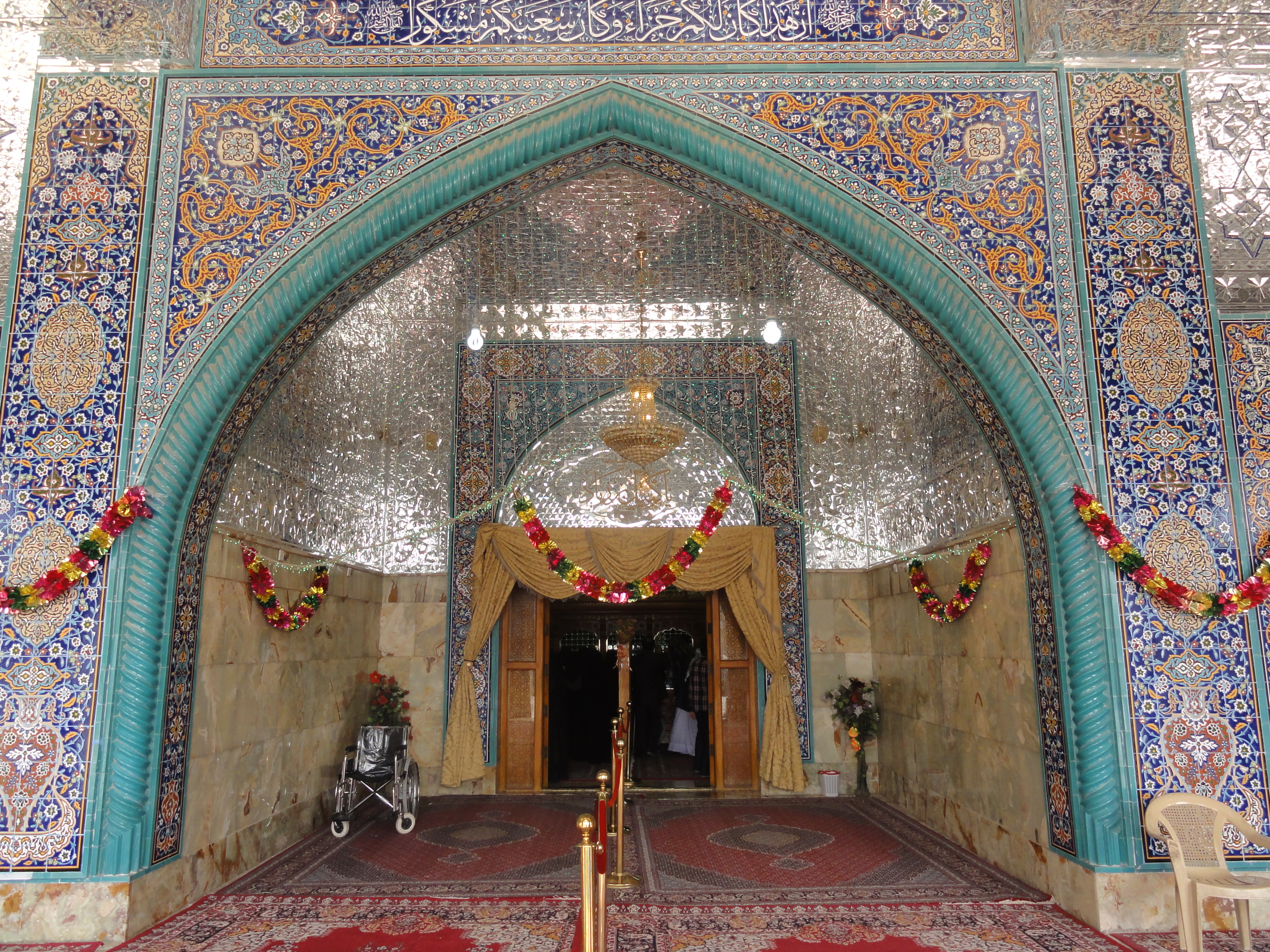
The doorway into the shrine

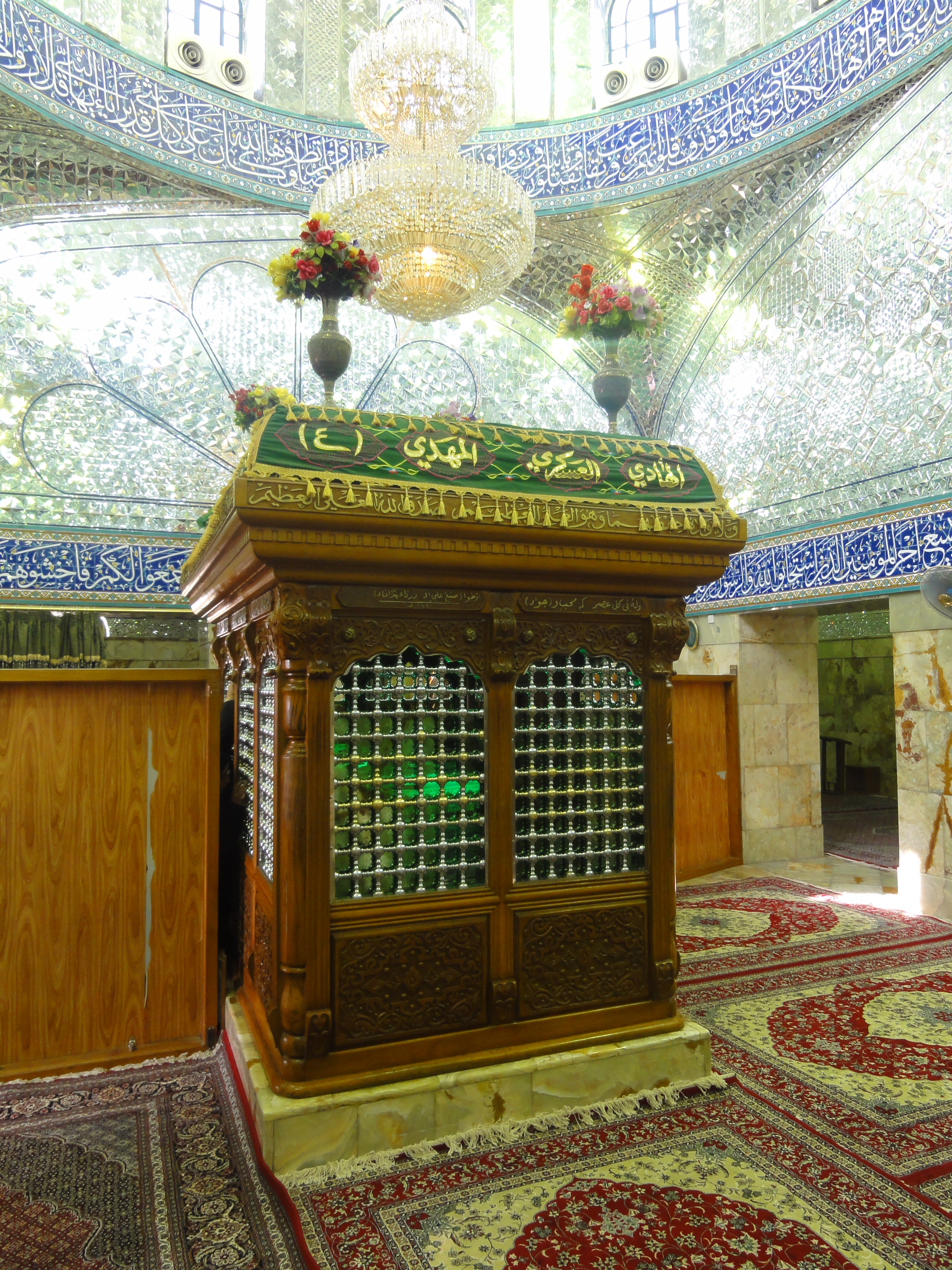
The grave of Kumayl, covered with a zarih

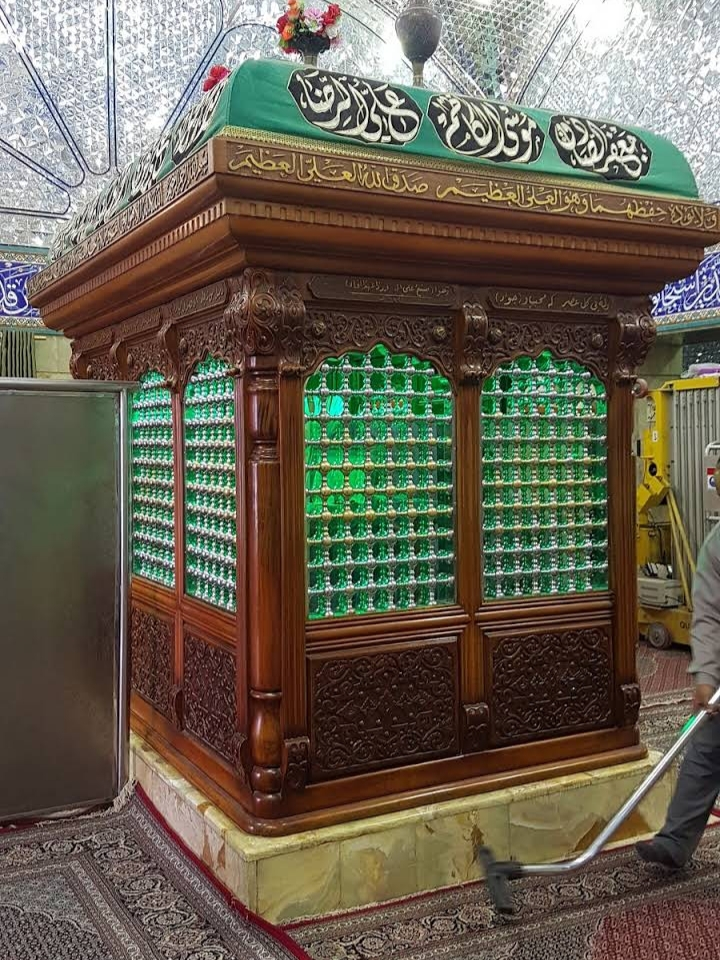
Closer view of the grave

== See also ==
- Imam Ali Mosque
- List of mosques in Iraq
