= Safina =

Safina may refer to:

== People ==
=== Given named ===
- Safina Saima Khar, Pakistani politician
- Safina Madhani (born 1984), Kenyan squash player
- Safina Sadullayeva (born 1998), Uzbek highjumper

=== Surnamed ===
- Ali Safina (born 1983), Pakistani actor
- Alessandro Safina (born 1963), Italian tenor
- Carl Safina (born 1955), American ecologist
- Safina (Russian: Сафина), the feminine form of Safin (Russian: Сафин), including:
  - Dinara Safina (born 1986, Russian: Динара Сафина), Russian tennis player
  - Karina Safina (born 2004, Russian: Карина Сафина), Russian figure skater for Georgia
  - Rushaniya Safina (born 1993), Uzbekistani soccer player
  - Yuliya Safina (born 1950, Russian: Юлия Сафина), Russian handball player

== Places ==
- Safina, Jordan, a village in northern Jordan

== Other uses ==
- Safina (political party), Kenyan political party.
- Safina Nuh, the Islamic rendering of Noah's Ark as described in Hud (sura)
- Safina-yi Tabriz, a 14th-century manuscript
- The Safina Center, U.S. nature conservancy
- 88 Aquarii, a star also named Safina
- TV Safina, a Tajikistani television channel

== See also ==
- SS Safina-E-Hujjaj, an oceanliner
- Syngnathus safina (S. safina), a species of pipefish
- Safin (disambiguation)
