= Saffin =

Saffin is a surname. Notable people with the surname include:

- Janelle Saffin (born 1954), Australian politician
- Jeannie Saffin (1921–1982), alleged victim of spontaneous human combustion
- John Saffin (1626–1710), Boston merchant

== See also ==
- Laffin
- Safin (name)
