= Sa'id ibn Jubayr =

Early Islamic scholar and jurist

Sa'id ibn Jubayr سعيد بن جبير

Personal life
- Born: c.665 Kufa, Umayyad Caliphate
- Died: c.714 Al-Hay, Umayyad Caliphate
- Era: Umayyad Era
- Region: Umayyad Caliphate

Religious life
- Religion: Islam

Muslim leader
- Influenced by: Ali ibn Husayn Zayn al-Abidin, Abd Allah ibn Abbas, Abd Allah ibn Umar

Sa‘īd ibn Jubayr (665–714) (Arabic: سعيد بن جبير), also known as Abū ‘Abd Allāh, was originally from Kufa, in modern-day Iraq. He was regarded as one of the leading members of the Tabi'in (d. ca. 712). Sa'īd is held in the highest esteem by scholars of the Sunni Islamic tradition and was considered one of the leading jurists of the time. He also narrated several hadith from Ibn Abbas.

== Life ==
Originally from Africa, in Abyssinia, or from Koufa (the sources differ, it could be that it was his ancestors who came from Africa)., formerly a slave, he was the freedman of the Banû Wâlibah, a clan of the Banû Asad Ibn Khuzaymah tribe. At the battle of Jamājim in 82 AH (699-701), Ibn al-Ash'ath and his followers, including 100,000 from amongst the mawāli, took on the army of al-Hajjāj (d. 714), the governor of the Iraqi provinces during the reign of the Umayyad caliph Abd al-Malik. Within their forces was a group known as the 'Battalion of Qur'an Reciters' headed by Kumayl ibn Ziyad an-Nakha`i and including Sa`īd ibn Jubayr. The revolt was brutally put down and Sa`īd was forced to flee to the outskirts of Mecca. He persisted in travelling to Mecca itself twice a year to perform the hajj and `umrah and would enter Kufa secretly to help resolve peoples' religious issues. He also was the first men to be associated with blindfolded chess games.

== Dialogue between Ibn Jubayr and al-Hajjaj ==
Sa'īd was finally apprehended and brought before al-Hajjāj. Excerpts from a transcript of their dialogue follows:Sa'īd ibn Jubayr entered upon al-Hajjāj, who asked his name (and he knew his name well):

Sa'īd: Sa'īd ibn Jubayr.

Al-Hajjaj: Nay, you are Shaqīy ibn Kusayr. (al-Hajjāj is playing with words here: Sa'īd means happy and Shaqī means unhappy; Jubayr means one who splints broken bones and Kusayr means one who breaks them.)

Sa'īd: My mother knew better when she named me.

Al-Hajjāj: You are wretched (shaqīta) and your mother is wretched" (shaqiyat). Then he told him: "By Allah, I will replace your dunya with a blazing Fire.

Sa'īd: If I knew you could do it, I would take you as a God.

Al-Hajjāj: I have gold and wealth.

Bags of gold and silver were brought and spread before Sa'īd ibn Jubayr in order to try him.

Sa'īd: O Hajjāj, if you gathered it to be seen and heard in showing off, and to use it to avert others from the way of Allah, then by Allah, it will not avail you against Him in any way. Saying this, he aligned himself towards Qiblah.

Al-Hajjāj: Take him and turn him to other than the Qiblah. By Allah, O Sa'īd ibn Jubayr, I will kill you with a killing with which I have not killed any of the people.

Sa'īd: O Hajjāj choose for yourself whatever killing you want, by Allah you will not kill me with a killing except that Allah will kill you with a like of it, so choose for yourself whatever killing you like.

Al-Hajjāj: Turn him to other than the Qiblah.

Sa'īd: Wherever you [might] turn, there is the Face of Allah.

Al-Hajjāj: Put him under the earth.

Sa'īd: From it (the earth) We created you, and into it We will return you, and from it We will extract you another time.

Al-Hajjāj was outdone and ordered the beheading of Sa'īd ibn Jubayr. Sa'īd was martyred in the month of Sha'bān, 95 AH (ca. May 714) at the age of 49. Al-Hajjāj is reported to have soon lost his senses and died within a month.

== Legacy ==
=== Sunni view ===
Ibn Hajar al-Asqalani, a 15th century Shafi`i Islamic scholar writes:

....He narrated hadiths from Ibn Abbas, Ibn Al-Zubayr, Ibn Umar, Ibn Maqal, Udayy Ibn Hatim, Abu Mas`uod al-Ansari, Abu Sa`id al-Khudri, Abu Hurayra, Abu Musa al-Ash`ari, al-Dahhak ibn Qays al-Fihri, Anas, `Amr ibn Maymun, Abu `Abdulrahman al-Sulami and lady `A'isha..... Ibn Abi Mughira said that when people of Kufa visit Ibn `Abbas they used to ask him for Fatwa, he used to say them: "Isn't Sa'id Ibn Jubayr among you?".... `Amr ibn Maymun said that his father said that Sa'id ibn Jubayr passed away and every one on the earth attained his knowledge... Abu al-Qasim al-Tabari said: "He is a reliable Imam and hujjah on Muslims".....Ibn Hibban said: "He was jurist, worshiper, righteous and pious".

From him are recorded by Imams Bukhari, Muslim, al-Tirmidhi, al-Nasa'i, Abu Dawud, Ibn Maja, Imam Ahmad ibn Hanbal, Imam Malik ibn Anas and Ibn Ishaq. Sa'id narrates 147 traditions in Sahih Bukhari and 78 in Sahih Muslim.

=== Shia view ===
According to Khulasat al-aqwal by Al-Hilli and Rijal al-Kashshi by Muhammad ibn 'Umar al-Kashshi he was a Shia Muslim. They point out, among many, that Sa'id ibn Jubayr was a follower and companion of Ali ibn Husayn Zayn al-Abidin, supported the Alid rebellion against the Umayyads, for which he was killed by the Umayyad appointed Al-Hajjaj ibn Yusuf.

Sa'id was asked by Abd al-Malik ibn Marwan to write a book concerning Quranic exegesis. His exegesis is mentioned by Ibn al-Nadim in his al-Fihrist under Shiite exegeses, without mentioning any other exegesis that is temporally prior to it.

His mausoleum is located in al-Hay city in the Wasit Province of Iraq. In Iraq, Rabi' al-Awwal 25 of every year is recognized as the anniversary of Sa'id ibn Jubayr's martyrdom. On this day people congregate in his mausoleum and honor the day. His mausoleum is a pilgrimage site for the Shia Muslims.

== See also ==
- Ibn Abbas
- Kumayl ibn Ziyad

== Bibliography ==
- al-Mufīd, Kitāb al-Irshād, Ansariyan Publications.
- al-Qarashi, B.S., The Life of Imam Zayn l-'Abidin, Ansariyan Publications, 2000.
- al-Sayyid, K., Saeed bin Jubayr, Ansariyan Publications, 1996.
- Jafri, S.H.M., The Origins and Early Development of Shi'a Islam, Oxford University Press, 2001.
- Madelung, W., The Succession to Muhammad (A study of the early Caliphate), Cambridge University Press, 1997.
- Weststeijn. J.K. & de Voogt, A.J., "Dreams in Tabari: Husayn, Jubayr, and those in God's favor in the Umayyad period", Le Muséon: Revue d'études orientales 120:225–29, 2007.
- Weststeijn, Johan, & Alex de Voogt, "Sa'id b. Gubayr: piety, chess and rebellion", Arabica, 49/3 (2002): 383–6.
