= Asbat ibn Muhammad =

9th-century Islamic scholar and imam

Asbat ibn Muhammad al-Qurashi al-Kufi
- Title: Al-Muhaddith
- Died: 200 AH (815/816 CE); Kufa

Religious life
- Religion: Islam

Muslim leader
- Influenced: Ishaq Ibn Rahwayh

Abu Muhammad Asbat ibn Muhammad al-Qurashi al-Kufi (Arabic: أبو محمد أسباط بن محمد القرشي الكوفي, died 200 AH (815/816 CE)) was a muhaddith from Kufa.
