= Al-Hannanah Mosque =

Shi'ite Mosque in Iraq

- مَسْجِد ٱلْحَنَّانَة
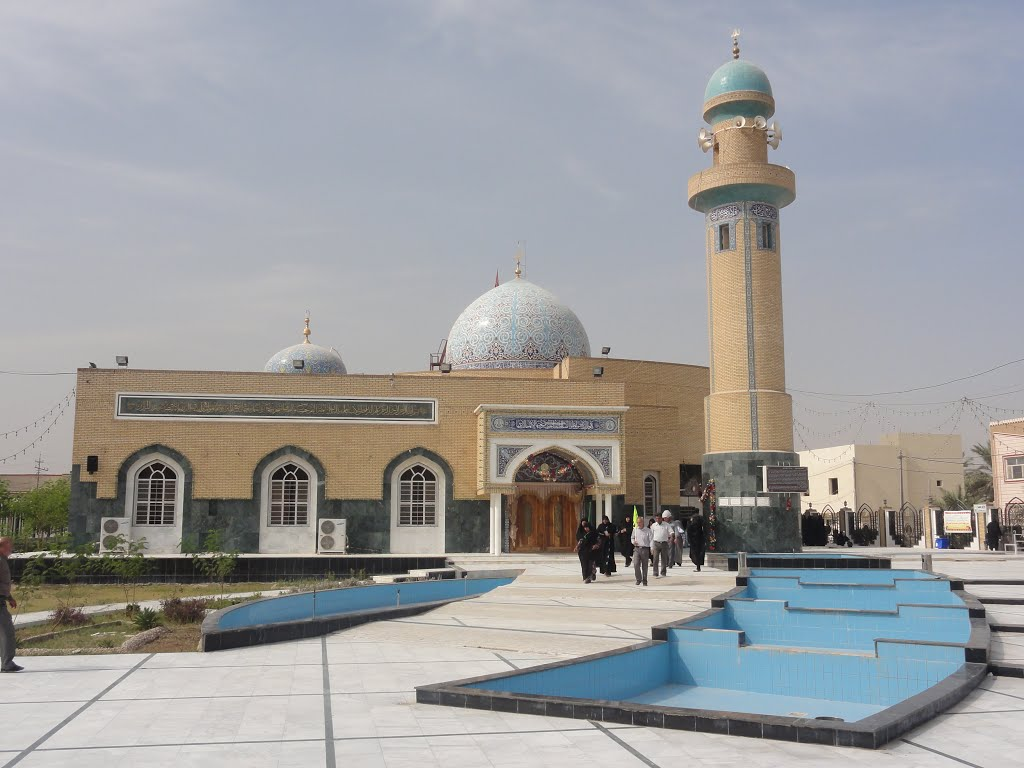
- The mosque in 2013

- Location of the mosque in Iraq

Religion
- Affiliation: Shia Islam
- Rite: Ziyarat
- Ecclesiastical or organizational status: Mosque and shrine
- Status: Active

Location
- Location: Kufa-Najaf Metropolis, Najaf Governorate
- Country: Iraq
- Interactive map of Al-Hannanah Mosque
- Coordinates: 32°00′18″N 44°20′04″E

Architecture
- Type: Islamic architecture
- Founder: Abbas I of Persia
- Completed: 462 AH (1069/1070 CE)

Specifications
- Dome: One
- Minaret: Two
- Site area: 7,400 m^{2} (80,000 sq ft)

The Al-Hannanah Mosque (Arabic: مَسْجِد ٱلْحَنَّانَة, romanized: Masjid al-Ḥannānah), also known as the Mosque of the Head (Arabic: مَسْجِد ٱلرَّأْس, romanized: Masjid ar-Raʾs), is a Shi'ite mosque, located in Najaf, in the Najaf Governorate of Iraq. The term "Mosque of the Head" is because the head of Husayn ibn Ali was kept in its middle, while being taken to his opponent Ubayd Allah ibn Ziyad, according to a hadith (narration) attributed to his descendant, Ja'far al-Sadiq.

== Specifications ==
The Al-Hannanah Mosque is located in the metropolis of Najaf and Kufah, near the grave of Kumayl ibn Ziyad, on a 7,400-square-metre (80,000 sq ft) site. According to Shaykh Al-Mufid, Sayyed Ibn Tawus and Shahid Awwal, when people arrived at the Al-Hannanah Mosque, they should recite two-unit prayers.

== History ==
Jaafar Mahbouba believes that this mosque was built along with the Imam Ali Shrine in 462 AH (1069/1070 CE). Al-Buraqi believed that this mosque was built by order of Abbas I of Persia, and due to this, he was known amongst the people of Najaf. According to Mohammad Hirz Eddin and Mirza Hadi el-Khurasani, Ghazan ibn Hulagu Khan ordered its construction.

According to a narration of Ja'far al-Sadiq, after Ali ibn Abi Talib died, his sons, Hasan and Husayn, carried his body from Kufa to Najaf. As they were passing, the pillars of the mosque inclined towards the body. The name Al-Hannanah means "to cry twice." This refers to two events: first, when Ali's burial shroud was brought to the mosque, and second, when the head of his son Husayn was brought through the mosque.

== Gallery ==
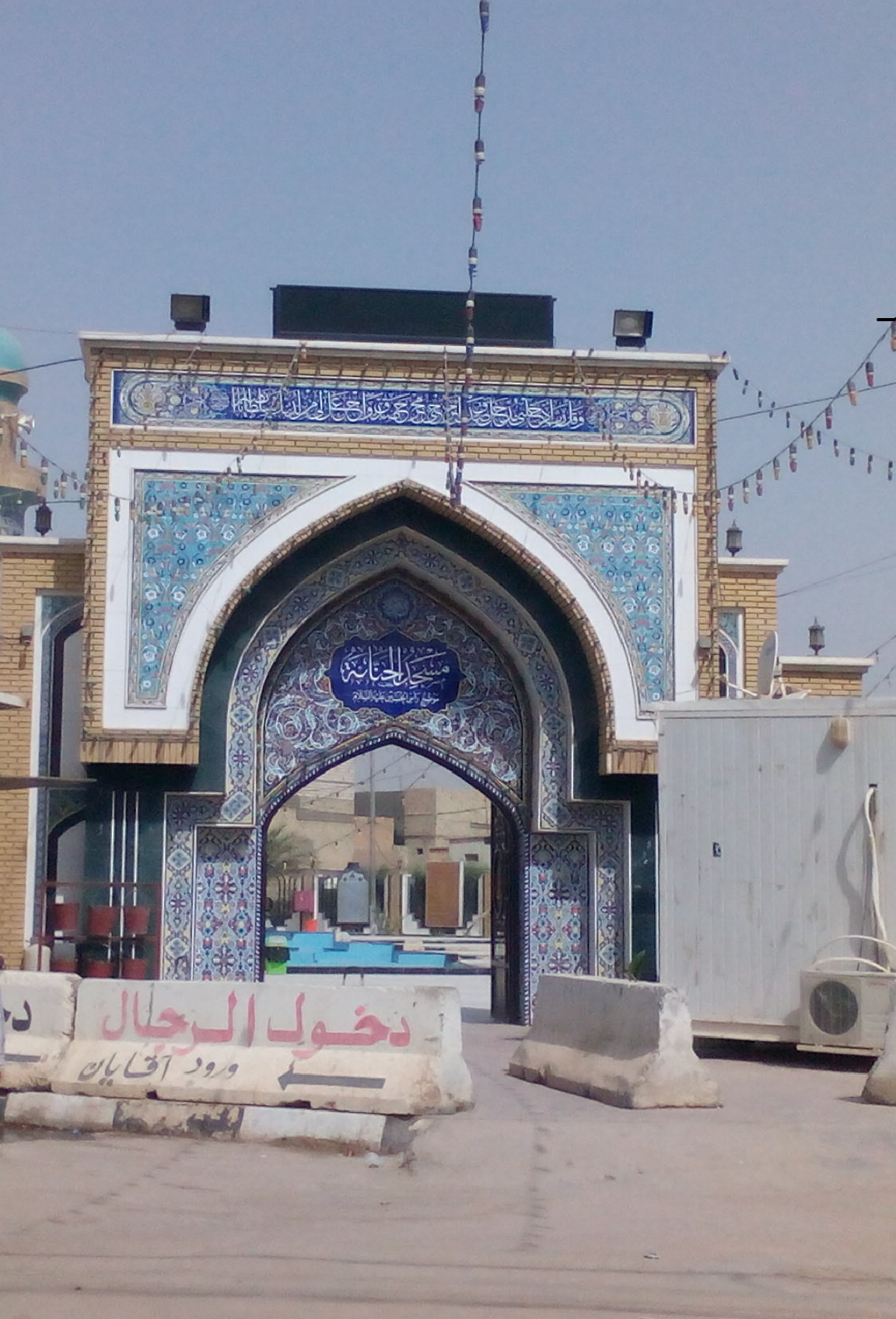
Iwan or entrance of the mosque

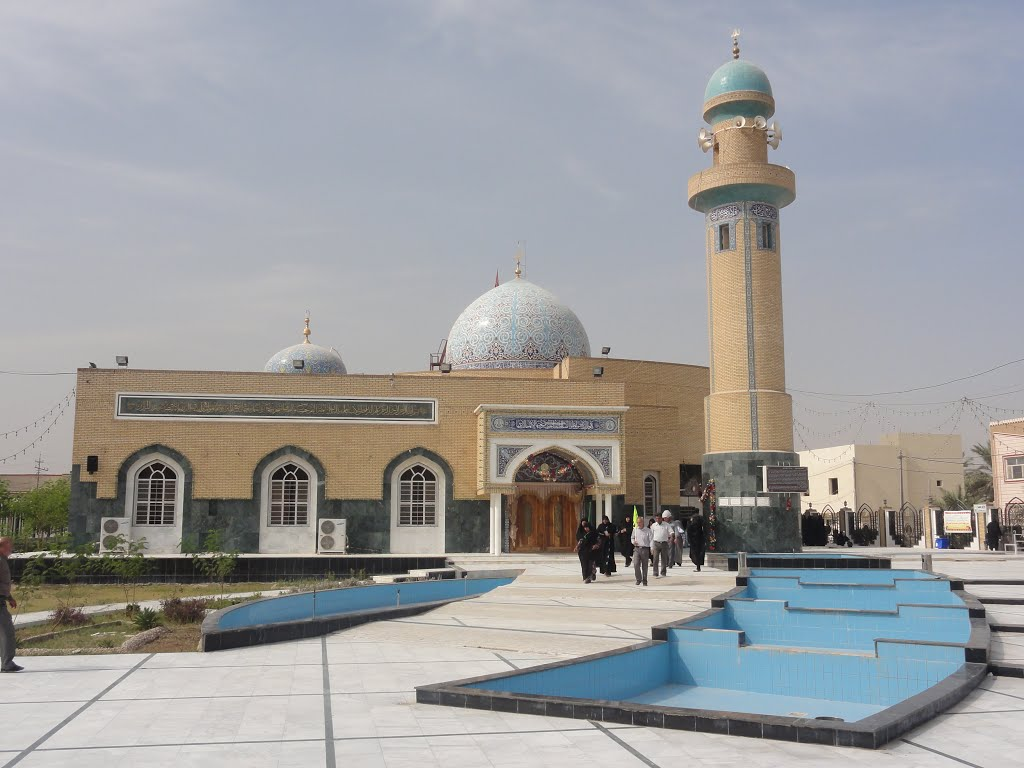
A larger view of the mosque

== See also ==
- Holiest sites in Shia Islam
- List of mosques in Iraq
- Shia Islam in Iraq
