= Laffin =

Laffin is a surname. Notable people with the surname include:

- Eric Laffin, French curler
- John Laffin (1922–2000), Australian military historian
- Dominique Laffin (1952–1985), French actress
- Mike Laffin, Canadian politician
- Christina Laffin, academic, researching Japanese literature and culture
- Josephine Laffin, Australian theologian
