= Safin (name) =

Safin (masculine) or Safina (feminine) is a given name and surname. It may refer to:

== Surname ==
- Alsou Safina, (born 1983), Russian singer known as Alsou
- Dinara Safina (born 1986), Russian tennis player
- Lenar Safin (born 1969), Russian politician
- Marat Safin (born 1980), Russian tennis player
- Marat Safin (footballer, born 1972), Russian footballer
- Ostap Safin (born 1999), Czech ice hockey player
- Rinnat Safin (1940–2014), Russian biathlete
- Sergey Safin, Russian boccia player
- Shazam Safin (1932–1985), Soviet wrestler
- Shukhrat Safin (1970–2009), Uzbekistani chess player
- Timur Safin (born 1992), Russian fencer
- Yuliya Safina (born 1950), Soviet/Russian handball player

== Given name ==
- Safin De Coque, Nigerian singer
- Safin Taki (born 1983), Swedish filmmaker

== Fictional characters ==
- Lyutsifer Safin, from the 2021 film No Time to Die

== See also ==
- Safina (disambiguation)
