= Kumayl ibn Ziyad =

Companion of Ali ibn Abi Talib

Kumayl ibn Ziyad al-Nakha'i
- كُمَيْلُ بْنُ زِيَادٍ النَّخْعِيُّ

Personal life
- Born: 633-4 CE
- Died: 708 CE Kufa
- Resting place: Mausoleum of Kumayl ibn Ziyad, Najaf
- Relations: Nakha (tribe)

Religious life
- Religion: Islam

Muslim leader
- Influenced by: Ali, Hasan ibn Ali

Kumayl ibn Ziyad al-Nakha'i (Arabic: كُمَيْلُ بْنُ زِيَادٍ النَّخْعِيُّ, romanized: Kumayl ibn Ziyād al-Nakhaʿī), born Kūmayl ibn Ziyād al-Nakhaʿī al-Madhḥijī was a prominent Tabi'un and a close companion of the first Shia Imam and fourth Rashidun caliph, Ali ibn Abi Talib. A member of the Nakha tribe of the Madhhij confederation, he is esteemed in Islamic tradition for his piety and his role in preserving the spiritual teachings of Ali.

Kumayl rose to political prominence during the caliphates of Uthman and Ali, famously serving as the governor of Hit. He is most widely recognized for transmitting Du'a Kumayl, a major supplication in the Shia tradition which he reportedly received from Ali. Historically, Kumayl was a vocal critic of the Umayyad administration and participated in the revolt of Ibn al-Ash'ath in 700. Following the failure of the uprising, he was captured and executed by the Umayyad governor Al-Hajjaj ibn Yusuf in 708.

== Early life and conversion ==
Kumayl ibn Ziyad belonged to the Nakha tribe, a prominent branch of the ancient Yemeni Madhhij confederation. His full lineage is recorded as Kumayl ibn Ziyad ibn Nahik ibn al-Haytham ibn Sa‘d ibn Malik ibn al-Harith ibn Suhban ibn Sa‘d ibn Malik ibn an-Nakha‘i.

Six months prior to his final expedition, the Islamic prophet Muhammad dispatched Khalid ibn al-Walid to Yemen to introduce Islam to the local population. Khalid's mission faced significant resistance, and the Yemenis reacted by throwing stones at him. Upon learning of this, Muhammad sent Ali to Yemen with a contingent of soldiers. When Ali arrived and began to speak of Islam, the crowd again threw stones and struck him. Ali ordered his soldiers to remain calm and maintained a composed demeanor. His display of good manners in the face of hostility impressed the Yemeni people. Consequently, many tribes, including the Kinda, Nakha, Hamadan, converted to Islam. It was during this time that Kumayl ibn Ziyad entered the faith, alongside Malik al-Ashtar, Hujr ibn Adi, and Uways al‑Qarani.

== Opposition to Uthman's administration ==
In 30 AH (650 CE), widespread dissatisfaction arose in Kufa regarding the conduct of the governor, Walid ibn Uqba, the half-brother of Uthman. Walid was accused of public intoxication and neglecting his religious duties; most notably, he was reported to have led the Fajr prayer while inebriated, performing four Raka'at instead of the prescribed two before asking the congregation if they wished for him to continue.

According to historical accounts by Abu Mikhnaf, Kumayl ibn Ziyad and his kinsman Amr ibn Zurara al-Nakha'i were the first to publicly call for the removal of Uthman and advocate for Ali as the rightful leader. This movement initially met with resistance from the provincial authorities; when Walid was informed of their activities, he initially intended to suppress them by force but was warned of the group's growing strength. Consequently, Uthman ordered the exile of Amr ibn Zurara to Damascus, describing him as a boorish bedouin.

Kumayl and other prominent Kufans, including Malik al-Ashtar, eventually formed a vocal delegation that traveled to Medina to petition Uthman directly. On this journey, the group stopped at Al-Rabadha to visit Abu Dharr al-Ghifari, a respected companion of Muhammad who was living in exile and whose health was rapidly declining. Abu Dharr expressed profound sorrow upon hearing of the political instability and tribal discontent in Kufa.

After the visit to Al-Rabadha, Malik and the delegation continued their journey to Medina. When they finally met with Uthman, they expressed their concerns about Al-Walid's conduct. Although their mission did not immediately succeed, Uthman eventually recalled Al-Walid and appointed Sa'id ibn al-As in his place.

As administrative policies grew stricter under the influence of Marwan I, public unrest culminated in the siege of the caliph's residence. During this period, Malik al-Ashtar led the Kufan rebel forces entering Medina. Although Ali sent his sons, Hasan and Husayn, to guard Uthman’s door and prevent violence, the situation escalated into Uthman's assassination. Following the event, Kumayl and Malik al-Ashtar were among the primary figures who urged Ali to accept the Caliphate, with Malik presenting Ali as the most qualified candidate due to his knowledge and proximity to Muhammad.

== Kumayl's description of Ali's Caliphate ==
In view of Imam Ali becoming the new caliph, Kumayl thought that the coming years would be peaceful. On the contrary, Kumayl narrates:

When Imam Ali ibn Abi Talib became caliph, we thought that the people would honor Imam Ali ibn Abi Talib, people would respect him. Those four-and-a-half years with Imam Ali ibn Abi Talib were the most turbulent years we ever faced in our live as human beings. I have never witnessed hatred like the hatred I witnessed against Imam Ali ibn Abi Talib. This man, when I was ten years of age, is the reason we the people of Yemen became Muslims. If it wasn't for him none of us would join the religion of Islam. And now when he becomes caliph, from every angle those who saw him give victory to Islam when he was younger. One by one they started coming out (against him). The confusion that began to effect us, the sahabah (companions) of Ali, was a confusion that you would never want to see. Because everyday there is an attack on our leader (Imam Ali) and there are wars against him. We finished the Jamal (a war), and they attacked him at Jamal. We finished Saffeen (another war), and they attacked him at Safeen. There were days where we sit with each other saying 'why is it that so many have a hatred for this man (Imam Ali)'. But the Imam would remain open with all of us. Any of us who approached him, he remained calm with us. He was a wall of unity for us.

Furthermore, even after the Battle of Sifeen, Kumayl narrates:

I remember one day after the Battle of Sifeen, we were walking past a house in Kufa, Imam Ameerul Momineen (Imam Ali) was with me. I heard from the house the most beautiful Quran being recited. A man recited the Quran in the middle of the night. I looked at Imam Ali ibn Abi Talib and said to him. 'O Imam this man reciting Quran, the words he is recites are so beautiful.' The Imam then looked at me and said 'Kumayl one day I will remind you about this man.'"

Months passed and the Khawaarij attacked Imam Ali at the Battle of Nahrawan. When the battle finished, Kumayl narrates:

Imam Ali ibn Abi Talib came up to me. He looked at me and said 'Kumayl do you see that man who has died over there from the Khawaarij army?' 'Mawla of course I see him.' He (Imam Ali) said 'Do you remember that night you and I were walking past a house and you said to me 'look how beautiful the Quran is from the man's house'?' I said to you 'wait there will be a day. That man laying there is that same man who was reciting the Quran.' What's the point of him reciting the Quran when he does not know my position within the Quran.

Kumayl further narrates:

Those years (referring to the caliphate of Imam Ali) were the most turbulent years for the companions of Ali. We lost Malik al-Ashtar. We lost Ammar ibn Yasir. One by one the companions of Ali ibn Abi Talib were dying. I myself was in a state of confusion.

== Kumayl the Governor of Hīt ==
Kumayl was appointed governor of Hīt, Iraq by Imam Ali who told him never to leave Hīt when situations got tough. Unfortunately, one day a situation occurred. Mu'awiya knew that if he could remove Shabath ibn Rib'i (also a companion of Imam Ali and the killer of Imam Husain ibn Ali, who was one of the last men to strike Imam Husain's neck, (the governor of Kafarqos, some say the city of Kirkeesya), then he could defeat Imam Ali. So Mu'awiya attacked the city of Kafarqos to try to remove Shabath ibn Rib'i.

Kumayl narrates:

I was in a state of confusion. Ali ibn Abi Talib had written to me saying' Kumayl never ever remove yourself from your city. I have put people in their different cities and they should never go and leave themselves.' When I saw Mu'awiya attack. I wondered how can I leave this city when it is under attack, even though Ali ibn Abi Talib told me not to leave my city? I was in utter confusion. I left my city alone. I went to defend Shabath ibn Rib'i, and when I did so I received a letter from him (Letter 61 in the Nahj al-Balagha).

=== Letter 61 from The Peak of Eloquence (Nahj al-Balagha) ===
It is wrong of a person to disregard and neglect the duty entrusted to him and try to take up the work entrusted to someone else - and at a time when he is not required to do it. Such an attribution indicates a weak and harmful mentality. Your desire to invade Kirkisiya and to leave your province undefended and unattended shows the confusion in your mind. By such an action you will convert yourself into a kind of bridge, which your enemy can cross conveniently to reach your friends. Thus you will be a useless auxiliary who has neither power nor prestige nor dignity; who cannot stop his enemy's in-roads, nor can crush him, and who cannot defend his subjects nor can he be of any use or help to his ruler.

Kumayl goes on to say: "I didn't know what to do. We were facing an absolute barrage of pressure from the attack at that time. We were holding on to Ameerul Momineen (Imam Ali) but Mu'awiya was launching attack after attack, and we did not know what our stand had to be."

== Secrets of the World ==
Eager to increase his understanding of this world, Kumayl ibn Ziyad loved to learn from his teacher, Imam Ali. Kumayl narrates:

There are times Ali ibn Abi Talib can see that you are going through difficulties. Those are the times when he takes you by the hand and reveals to you the secrets of this world. There are nights which I spent with Ali ibn Abi Talib where he increased my yaqeen (certainty) in Allah.

For example, the following discourse in which Imam Ali takes Kumayl to a graveyard outside Kufa:

O Kumayl ibn Ziyad, truly these hearts are vessels and the best of them are those which hold the most. So retain from me that which I say to you. People are divided into three types: a lordly knower (alim rabbani); one who seeks knowledge (muta'allim) for the sake of deliverance; and the common folk (hamaj ra'a) following just anyone, swaying with every current, not desiring to be illumined by the light of knowledge, nor seeking refuge from any strong support.

O Kumayl, knowledge is better than wealth, for knowledge guards you, while you must guard wealth; and wealth diminishes as it is spent, while knowledge increases as it is disbursed; and the results of wealth disappears with the disappearance of wealth.

O Kumayl ibn Ziyad, the wise apprehension of knowledge (ma'rifat al-'ilm) is a religion by which Allah is worshipped. Through it, man acquires obedience in his life and a good name after his death. And knowledge is a judge, while wealth is judged.

O Kumayl ibn Ziyad, those who hoard wealth perish even while they live, but the knowers endure for as long as time subsists; their (material) forms are absent, but their (spiritual) images in the hearts are present. Ah, what abundant knowledge is here (pointing to the chest); would that I could find one to bear it. Yes, I found one who was quick to understand, but he could not be trusted with it, exploiting the tools of religion for the sake of worldly gain, empowering himself with the grace of Allah against his slaves, and with his proofs against his friends. Then there was one who was obedient to the bearers of truth, but lacking heartfelt insight; at the first appearance of obscurity; doubt was kindled in his heart. So alas, neither this one nor that! Nor one who is greedy for pleasure, submissive to passion, nor one obsessed with acquisition and accumulation-neither of them is a guardian of religion in any respect. They resemble mothering so much as grazing cattle! Thus does knowledge die with death of its bearers.

But indeed, my Allah, the earth will never be empty of one who establishes the proof of Allah, whether overtly with publicity or fearfully in obscurity, lest Allah's proofs and elucidations come to naught. But such as these - how many are they and where? By Allah, they may be the smallest number, but with Allah they are the greatest rank. Through them Allah preserves his proofs and elucidations, so that they entrust them to their compeers and sow them in the hearts of those resembling them.

Through them, knowledge penetrates the reality of insight. They rejoice in their intimacy with the spirit of certainty; they make easy what the extravagant find harsh; they befriend that by which the ignorant are estranged. With their bodies they keep company with the world, while their spirits are tied to the transcendent realm.

They are vice-regents of Allah on his earth, summoners to his religion. Ah, how I long to see them! Go now, Kumayl as you will.

Another example, Imam Ali takes Kumayl outside of Kufa on a starry night with a breeze of wind. He narrates:

Kumayl, these hearts are containers (of knowledge). The best of them are those that best preserve knowledge. Therefore, preserve what I say to you.

There are three classes of people. The first class knows Allah. The second learns knowledge as means of salvation. And the third is rabble: followers of every crier, who bend with every breeze. These men do not seek to be illuminated by the light of learning, nor do they resort to any authority.

Kumayl, knowledge is better than wealth. Knowledge guards you while you guard wealth. Wealth is diminished by expenditure while knowledge is increased even by giving it away.

Kumayl, those who amass wealth die even as they live while those who have knowledge will continue to exist for as long as time lasts."

=== Hadith al-Haqiqa (Reality) ===
Kumayl narrates:

I was riding my horse behind Ali ibn Abi Talib. And while he was riding his horse and I am behind him, I called out to him, 'Whats the truth?' Imam Ali said 'Sorry'. I said 'What is the truth? Who are you?' He looked at me and said 'What have you got to do with the truth.' I said 'When you come to the door of bounties it is known that you never turn anyone away.' Imam Ali replied, 'What sprinkles in you, overflows in me. You want to know the truth who I am? You want to know the truth? You think you are close to me and you want to know the truth, you think you know the truth as to who I am? I will tell you what the truth is. The truth is the revelation of the splendor of the divine majesty without a sign.' I (Kumayl) said, 'I don't understand what you mean, tell me more.' He said 'It is the defacement of the conjecture through the clearing of the known.' I (Kumayl) said 'I don't understand, but continue telling me what is the truth.' He said 'It's the rendering of the veils by the triumph of mystery.' I said 'Tell me more.' He said 'It is the divine attraction, but through the apprehension of the known.' I said 'Tell me more.' He said 'It's that light of the morning eternity that continues to radiate through the unity of the temples and their disunity. That's who I am.' I did not have a clue as to what he meant. Imam Ali continue riding the horse and I continued riding behind him. Ali's final answer was: "Extinguish the lamp, for the Sun has risen."

== Du'as from Imam Ali saved by Kumayl ==
Kumayl ibn Ziyad saved many Du'as which he learned from Imam Ali. Two of these du'as are "Du'a Sabah" and "Du'a of Prophet Khidr" (renamed "Du'a Kumayl").

=== Du'a Sabah (Morning Supplication) ===
In the Name of Allah, the most Beneficent, the most Merciful

Oh God, Oh He who extended the morning's tongue in the speech of its dawning, dispatched the fragments of the dark night into the gloom of its stammering, made firm the structure of the turning spheres in the measures of its display, and beamed forth the brightness of the sun through the light of its blazing! Oh, He who demonstrates His Essence by His Essence, transcends congeneity with His creatures and is exalted beyond conformity with His qualities!

Oh, He who is near to the passing thoughts of opinions, far from the regards of eyes, and knows what will be before it comes to be! Oh, He who has put me at ease in the cradle of His security and sanctuary, awakened me to the favors and kindness that He has bestowed upon me, and held from the claws of evil with His hand and His force!

Bless, O God, the guide to Thee in the darkest night, him who, of Thy ropes, clings to the cord of the longest nobility; him whose glory is evident at the summit of stout shoulders, and whose feet were entrenched in spite of slippery places in ancient time; and [bless] his household, the good, the chosen, the pious,

And open for us, O God, the leaves of morning's door with the keys of mercy and prosperity! Clothe me, O God, with the most excellent robes of guidance and righteousness!

Plant, O God, through Thy awesomeness, the springs of humility in the watering place of my heart! Cause to flow, O God, because of Thy awesomeness, tears of moaning from the corner of my eyes! And chastise, O God, the recklessness of my clumsiness with the reins of contentment! My God, if mercy from Thee does not begin with fair success for me, then who can take me to Thee upon the evident path?

If Thy deliberateness would turn me over to the guide of hope and wishes, then who will annul my slips from the stumbles of caprice? If Thy deliberateness should turn me over to the guide of hope and wishes, then who will annul my slips from the stumbles of caprice? If Thy help should forsake me in the battle with the soul and Satan, then Thy forsaking will have entrusted me to where there is hardship and deprivation. My God, dost Thou see that I have only come to Thee from the direction of hopes or clung to the ends of Thy cords when my sins have driven me from the house of union?

So what an evil mount upon which my soul has mounted – its caprice! Woe upon it for being seduced by its own opinions and wishes! And destruction be upon it for its audacity toward its Master and Protector! My God, I have knocked upon the door of Thy mercy with the hand of my hope, fled to Thee seeking refuge from my excessive caprice and fixed the fingers of my love to the ends of Thy cords.

So pardon, O God, the slips and errors I have committed and release me from the foot-tangling of my robe. For Thou art my Master, my Protector, my Support and my Hope and Thou art the object of my search and my desire in my ultimate end and stable abode. My God, how couldst Thou drive away a poor beggar who seeks refuge in Thee from sins, fleeing? Or how couldst Thou disappoint one seeking guidance who repairs to Thy threshold, running?

Never! For Thy pools are full in the hardship of drought, Thy door is open for seeking and penetration and Thou art the goal of requests and the object of hopes. My God, these are the reins of my soul I have bound them with the ties of Thy will. These are the burdens of my sins I have averted them with Thy pardon and mercy. And these are my caprices that lead astray - I have entrusted them to the threshold of Thy gentleness and kindliness.

So make this morning of mine, O God, descend upon me with the radiance of guidance, and with safety in religion and this world! And [make] my evening a shield against the deception of enemies and a protection against the destructive blows of caprice!

Verily Thou art able over what Thou wilt! Thou givest the kingdom to whom Thou wilt, and Thou seizest the kingdom from whom Thou wilt; Thou exaultest whom Thou wilt, and Thou abasest whom Thou wilt; in Thy hand is the good; Thou art powerful over all things. Thou makest the night to enter into the day, and Thou makest the day to enter into the night; Thou bringest forth the living from the dead, and Thou bringest forth dead from the living; and Thou providest whomsoever Thou wilt without reckoning.

There is no god but Thou! Glory be to Thee, O God, and Thine is the praise! Who knows Thy measure without fearing Thee? Who knows what Thou art without awe of Thee? Through Thy power Thou hast joined disparate things, through Thy gentleness Thou hast cleaved apart the daybreak and through Thy generosity Thou hast illumined the dark shrouds of night. Thou hast made waters, sweet and salt, flow forth from hard shining stones, sent down out of rain-clouds water cascading, and appointed the sun and moon a blazing lamp for the creatures, without experiencing in that which Thou originated either weariness or effort.

So, O He who is alone in might and subsistence and dominates His slaves with death and annihilation, Bless Muhammad and his household, the god-fearing, answer my supplication hear my call, destroy my enemies and actualize through Thy bounty my hope and desire.

O best of those who is called to remove affliction and object of hope in every difficulty and ease! I have stated my need, so do not reject me, O my master, despairing of Thy exalted gifts. O All-generous! O All-generous! O All-generous! By Thy mercy, O Most Merciful of the merciful! And God bless the best of His creatures, Muhammad, and all his household!

Then prostrate and say:

My God, my heart is veiled, my soul deficient, my intelligence defeated, my caprice triumphant, my obedience little, my disobedience much and my tongue acknowledges sins. So what am I to do? O He who covers defects! O He who knows the unseen things! Forgive my sins, all of them, by the sacredness of Muhammad and the household of Muhammad! O All-forgiver! O All-forgiver! O All-forgiver! By Thy mercy, O Most Merciful of the merciful!

=== Du'a Kumayl ===
History

Kumayl narrates:

It was in the Mosque in Basrah, Iraq. Imam Ali ibn Abi Talib was giving us a talk. He said all of you should recite the Du'a of Prophet Khidr. This du'a should be recited either on the 15th of Shaban (Islamic month), or on a Thursday night, or whenever you can. This du'a removes evils from your life, removes all forms of envy, and removes any suffering that will exist in your life.

After the group of companions heard the du'a, they left to go home. Kumayl said, "I stayed behind. I said 'O Amir al-Momineen can you teach me the du'a? Because I don't just want to listen to a du'a, I want to make sure that the du'a spreads in the lives of people for ever'." Imam Ali then told Kumayl, "Allah may protect thee from the evils of the enemies and the plots contrived by impostors. O' Kumayl! in consideration of thy companionship and understanding, I grant thee this honour of entrusting this "Du'a" to thee." Kumayl wrote down the supplication to preserve it.

How and Why Did the Du'a's Name Change

The name of the Du'a changed from "Du'a of Prophet Khidr" to "Du'a Kumayl" because Kumayl memorized it and was one of the main people who spread the du'a. Over the years people began referring the du'a as "Du'a Kumayl" because he was the one who wrote it down and spread it to others.

The Du'a (Supplication)

In the Name of Allah, the most Beneficent, the most Merciful

O Allah! Bless Muhammad and his progeny.

O Allah! I beseech Thee by Thy mercy which encompasses all things, and by Thy power by which Thou overcometh all things, and submit to it all things, and humble before it all things, and by Thy might by which Thou hast conquered all things, and by Thy majesty against which nothing can stand up. And by Thy grandeur which prevails upon all things, and by Thy authority which is exercised over all things, and by Thy own self that shall endure forever after all things have vanished, and by Thy Names which manifest Thy power over all things, and by Thy knowledge which pervades all things, and by the light of Thy countenance which illuminates everything O Thou who art the light!

O Thou who art the most holy! O Thou who existed before the foremost! O Thou who shall exist after the last!

O Allah! Forgive me my such sins as would affront my continency O Allah! Forgive me my such sins as would bring down calamity. O Allah! Forgive me my such sins as would change divine favours into disfavours. O Allah! Forgive me my such sins as would hinder my supplication. O Allah! Forgive me such sins as bring down misfortunes or afflictions. O Allah! Forgive my such sins as would suppress hope.

O Allah! Forgive every sin that I have committed and every error that I have erred. O Allah! I endeavor to draw myself nigh to Thee through Thy invocation, and I pray to Thee to intercede on my behalf, and I entreat Thee by Thy benevolence to draw me nearer to Thee. And grant me that I should be grateful to Thee, and inspire me to remember and to invoke Thee.

O Allah! I entreat Thee begging Thee submissively, humbly and awestruck, to treat me with clemency and mercy, and to make me pleased and contented with what Thou hast allotted to me, and cause me to be modest and unassuming in all circumstances.

O Allah! I beg Thee as one who is passing through extreme privation, and who supplicates his needs to Thee, and his hope has been greatly raised by that which is with Thee.

O Allah! Great is Thy kingdom and exalted is Thy greatness. Thy plan is secret, Thy authority is manifest, Thy might is victorious and subduing, and Thy power is prevalent throughout. And it is not possible to escape from Thy dominion

O Allah! Except Thee I do not find any one able to pardon my sins nor to conceal my loathsome acts. Nor have I any one except Thee to change my evil deeds into virtues. There is no god but Thou. Glory and praise be to Thee. I have made my own soul to suffer> I had the audacity (to sin) by my ignorance, relying upon my past remembrance of Thee and Thy grace towards me.

O Allah! My Lord! How many of my loathsome acts hast Thou screened (from public gaze)? How many of my grievous afflictions (distresses) hast Thou reduced in severity? And how many of my stumbling hast Thou protected? How many of my detestable acts has Thou averted, and how many of my undeserving praises hast Thou spread abroad!?

O Allah! My trials and sufferings have increased, and my evilness has worsened. My good deeds have diminished and my yokes (of misdeeds) have become firm. And remote hopes restrain me to profit (by good deeds). And the world has deceived me with its allurements, and my own self has been affected by treachery and procrastination. Therefore, my Lord! I implore Thee by Thy greatness not to let my sins and my misdeeds shut out access to my prayers from reaching Thy realm. And not to disgrace me by exposing those (hidden ones) of which Thou hast knowledge, nor to hasten my retribution for those vices and misdeeds committed by me in secret, which were due to evil mindedness, ignorance, excessive lustfulness and my negligence.

O Allah! I beg Thee by Thy greatness to be compassionate to me in all circumstances, and well disposed towards me in all matters. My God! My Nourisher! Have I anyone except Thee from whom I can seek the dislodging of my evils and understanding of my problems? My God! My Master! Thou decreed a law for me but instead I obeyed my own low desires, and I did not guard myself against the allurements of my enemy. He deceived me with vain hopes whereby I was led astray, and fate helped him in that respect. Thus I transgressed some of its limits set for me by Thee, and I disobeyed some of Thy commandments. Thou hast therefore a (just) cause against me in all those matters, and I have no plea against Thy judgment passed against me. I have therefore become (justifiably) liable to Thy judgment and afflictions.

But now I have turned to Thee, my Lord, after being guilty of omissions and transgressions against my soul, apologetically, repentantly, brokenheartedly, entreating earnestly for forgiveness, yielding, and confessing (to my guilt). As I can find no escape from that which was done by me, and having no refuge to which I could turn except seeking Thy acceptance of my excuse, and admitting me into the realm of Thy capacious mercy.

O Allah! Accept my apology and have pity on my intense sufferings, and set me free from my heavy fetters (of evil deeds). My Nourisher! Have mercy on the infirmity of my body, the delicacy of my skin, and the brittleness of my bones.

O' Thou! who originated my creation and accorded me my individuality, and ensured my upbringing and welfare, and provided my sustenance, I beg Thee to restore Thy favours and blessings upon me as Thou didst in the beginning of my life.

O' my God! My master! My Lord! And my Nourisher! What! Wilt Thou see me punished with the fire kindled by Thee, despite my belief in Thy unity? And despite the fact that my heart has been filled with pure knowledge of Thee, and when my tongue has repeatedly praised Thee, and my conscience has acknowledged Thy love, and despite my sincere confessions (of my sins), and my humble entreaties submissively made to Thy divinity?

Nay, Thou art far too kind and generous to destroy one whom thyself nourished and supported, or to drive away from Thyself one whom Thou has kept under Thy protection, or to scare away one whom Thy self hast given shelter, or to abandon in affliction one Thou hast maintained and to whom Thou hast been merciful. I wish I had known o' my Master, my God and my Lord! Wilt Thou inflict fire upon faces which have submissively bowed in prostration to Thy greatness, or upon the tongues which have sincerely confirmed Thy unity, and have always expressed gratitude to Thee, or upon hearts which have acknowledged Thy divinity with conviction, or upon the minds which accumulated so much knowledge of Thee until they became submissive to Thee, or upon the limbs which strove, at the places appointed for Thy worship, to adore Thee willingly, and seek Thy forgiveness submissively? Such sort of harshness is not expected from Thee as it is remote from Thy grace, o' generous one!

O' Lord! Thou art aware of my weakness to bear even a minor affliction of this world, and its consequence, and adversity affecting the denizen of this earth, although such afflictions are momentary, short-lived and transient. How then can I bear the retributions and the punishments of the hereafter which are enormous and of intensive sufferings, of prolonged period and perpetual duration, and which shall never be alleviated for those who deserve the same as those retributions will be the result of Thy wrath; and Thy punishment which neither the heavens nor the earth can withstand and bear! My Lord! How can I, a weak, insignificant, humble, poor and destitute creature of Thine be able to bear them?

O' my God! My Lord! My King! And Master! Which of the matters shall I complain to Thee, and for which of them shall I bewail and weep? Shall I bewail for the pains and pangs of the punishment and their intensity, or for the length of sufferings and their duration? Therefore my Lord! If Thou wilt subject me to the penalties of hell in company of Thy enemies, and cast me with those who merited Thy punishments, and tear me apart from Thy friends and those who will be near to Thee, then my God, my Lord and my Master, though I may patiently bear Thy punishments, how can I calmly accept being kept away from Thee? I reckon that though I may patiently endure the scorching fire of Thy hell, yet how can I resign myself to the denial of Thy pity and clemency? How can I remain in the fire while I have hopes of Thy forgiveness?

O' my Lord! By Thy honour truly do I swear that, if Thou wilt allow my power of speech to be retained by me in the hell, I shall among its inmates cry out bewailingly unto Thee like the cry of those who have faith in Thy kindness and compassion. And I shall bemoan for Thee, for being deprived of nearness to Thee, the lamentation of those who are bereaved, and I shall keep on calling unto Thee: 'Where art Thou o' Friend of the believers! O' Thou who art the last hope and resort of those who acknowledge Thee and have faith in Thy clemency and kindness. O' Thou who art the helper of those seeking help! O' Thou who art dear to the hearts of those who truly believe in Thee! And o' Thou who art the Lord of the universe.'

My Lord! Glory and praise be to Thee. Wouldst Thou wish to be seen disregarding the voice of a Muslim bondman, incarcerated therein hell for his disobedience, and imprisoned within its pits for his evil doings and misdeeds, crying out to Thee the utterance of one who has faith in Thy mercy, and calling out to Thee in the language of those who believe in Thy unity, and seeking to approach Thee by means of Thy epithet 'the Creator, the Nourisher, the Accomplisher, and the Protector of the entire existence?'

My Lord! Then how could he remain in torments when he hopefully relies upon Thy past forbearance, compassion and mercy? And how can the fire cause him suffering when he hopes for Thy grace and mercy? And how can its roaring flames char him when Thou heareth his voice and seeith his plight? And how can he withstand its roaring flames when Thou knowest his frailty? And how can he be tossed about between its layers when Thou knoweth his sincerity? And how can the guards of hell threaten him when he calls out to Thee? 'My Lord', and how would Thou abandon him therein (the hell) when he has faith in Thy grace to set him free?

Alas! That is not the concept we hold of Thee, nor has Thy grace such a reputation, nor does it resemble that which Thou hast awarded by Thy kindness and generosity to those who believe in Thy unity. I definitely conclude that hadst Thou not ordained punishment for those who disbelieved in Thee, and hadst Thou not decreed Thy enemies to remain in hell, Thou wouldst have made the hell cold and peaceful and there would never have been an abode or place for any one in it; but sanctified be Thy Names, Thou hast sworn to fill the hell with the disbelievers from among the jinns and mankind together, and to place forever Thy enemies therein. And Thou, exalted be Thy praises, hadst made manifest, out of Thy generosity and kindness, that a believer is not like unto him who is an evil-liver.

My Lord! My Master! I, therefore implore Thee by that power which Thou determineth, and by the decree which Thou hast finalised and ordained, whereby Thou hath prevailed upon whom Thou hast imposed it, to bestow upon me this night, and this very hour, the forgiveness for all the transgressions that I have been guilty of, for all the sins that I have committed, for all the loathsome acts that I have kept secret, and for all the evils done by me, secretly or openly, in concealment or outwardly. And for every evil action that Thou hast ordered the two noble scribes to confirm, whom Thou hast appointed to record all my actions, and to be witnesses over me along with the limbs of my body, while Thou observeth over me besides them, and was witness to those acts concealed from them. Which Thou in Thy mercy hast kept secret, and through Thy kindness unexposed, and I pray to Thee to make my share plentiful in all the good that Thou dost bestow; in all the favours that Thou dost grant; and in all the virtues that Thou dost allow to be known everywhere; and in all the sustenance and livelihood that Thou dost expand and in respect of all the sins that Thou dost forgive and the wrongs that Thou dost cover up O' Lord! O' Lord! O' Lord!

O' my God! My Lord! My King! O' Master of my freedom! O' Thou who holdeth my destiny, and who art aware of my suffering and poverty, O' Thou who knoweth my destitution and starvation. O' my Lord! O' Lord, O' Lord! I beseech Thee by Thy glory and Thy honour, by Thy supremely high attributes, and by Thy names, to cause me to utilise my time, day and night, in Thy remembrance, by engaging myself in serving Thee (Thy cause), and to let my deeds be such as to be acceptable to Thee. So much so that all my actions and offerings (prayers) may be transformed into one continuous and sustained effort, and my life may take the form of constant and perpetual service to Thee.

O' my Master! O' Thou upon Whom I rely! O' Thou unto Whom I express my distress!

O' my Lord! My Lord! My Lord! Strengthen my limbs for Thy service, and sustain the strength of my hands to persevere in Thy service. And bestow upon me the eagerness to fear Thee and constantly to serve Thee so that I may lead myself towards Thee in the field with the vanguards who are in the fore rank. And be swift towards Thee among those who hasten towards Thee, and urge eagerly to be near Thee. And draw myself towards Thee like them who sincerely draw themselves towards Thee. And to fear Thee like the fear of those who believe firmly in Thee. And thus I may join the congregation of the faithful congregated near Thee for protection.

O' Allah! Whosoever intendeth evil against me, let ill befall him, and frustrate him who plots against me. And assign for me a place in Thy presence with the best of Thy bondsmen, and nearer abode to Thee. For verily that position cannot be attained except through Thy grace. And treat me benevolently, and through Thy greatness extend Thy munificence towards me. And through Thy mercy protect me and cause my tongue to accentuate Thy remembrance, and my heart filled with Thy love. And be liberal to me by Thy gracious response, and cause my evils to appear fewer and forgive me my errors. For verily, Thou hast ordained for Thy bondsmen Thy worship and bidden them to supplicate unto Thee and hast assured them of Thy response.

So, my Lord! I look earnestly towards Thee, and towards Thee, my Lord! I have stretched forth my hands. Therefore, by Thy honour, respond to my supplication and let me attain my wishes and, by Thy bounty, frustrate not my hopes, and protect me from the evils of my enemies, from among the jinns and mankind. O' Thou! Who readily pleased, forgive one who owns nothing but supplication for Thou doest what Thou willest.

O' Thou! Whose Name is the remedy for all ills, and Whose remembrance is a sure cure for all ailments, and obedience to Whom makes one self sufficient, have mercy on one whose only asset is hope, and whose only armour is lamentation. O' Thou! Who perfecteth all bounties and Who wardeth off all misfortunes!

O' Light! Who illuminates those who are in bewilderment! O' Omniscient! Who knoweth without (acquisition of) learning! Bless Mohammed and the Descendants of Mohammed, and do unto me in accordance with that which befitteth Thee. And deal with me not in accordance to my worth. May the blessings of Allah be bestowed upon His Apostle, and the Rightful Imams from his Descendants. And His peace be upon them plentifully.

== ِAssassination of Ali and Kumayl's reaction ==
On the 19th of Ramadan, while praying (Nafil Fajr) in the Great Mosque of Kufa, Imam Ali was attacked by a Khawarij named Abd-al-Rahman ibn Muljam. He struck Imam Ali with a poison-coated sword while he was prostrating. It is said that Ibn Muljam struck Imam Ali on the same spot where Amr Ibn Abduwud struck him in the Battle of Khandaq. The poison slowly started to affect Imam Ali's body. A few days later, on January 31, 661, (21 Ramadan 40 A.H) Imam Ali died. The news of his martyrdom saddened the hearts of his family, companions, as well as the Muslim Empire. Particularly, Kumayl, who cried after seeing his best friend leave this world. He became very emotional and saddened. Kumayl, himself, says: "When I lost Ali ibn Abi Talib, I lost the secrets of Allah on Earth."

== Kumayl disappears from history ==
There are no historical records of Kumayl during the period between 40 AH (660 CE) to 80 AH. After the martyrdom of Imam Ali, Kumayl suddenly disappeared for 40 years. High scholars have no clue as to where he was during these years. He is not mentioned in any major events, including the Event of Ashura, nor is he mentioned after that event, until 80 AH. However, there is a theory that Kumayl was imprisoned by Governor Ubayd Allah ibn Ziyad (no blood relation of Kumayl), because there are historical records of a person named Kumayl al-Hamadan'i, who was imprisoned by Ubayd Allah ibn Ziyad. The title al-Hamadan'i is given to a person from the tribe of Hamadan of Yemen. The Hamadan tribe was one of the four major tribes of Yemen and was closely linked to the Banu Nakha tribe - the tribe that Kumayl ibn Ziyad is from, hence his title al-Nakha'i. The theory is that the historical records might have misspelled, or misinterpreted, or misunderstood, or confused Kumayl's title, so that Kumayl al-Hamadan'i was actually Kumayl al-Nakha'i (Kumayl ibn Ziyad).

== Kumayl's reappearance and the revolt against al-Hajjaj ibn Yusuf al-Thaqafi ==
When Abd al-Malik ibn Marwan took power, he made Hajjaj ibn Yusuf the governor of Kufa. Al-Hajjaj did his best to please Abd al-Malik ibn Marwan by imprisoning protesters, innocent men, and women - mainly Shi’as. His prison held fifty thousand men and thirty thousand women. These prisons were not ordinary prisons; they were meant to torture individuals. For example, the prisons did not have roofs. Prisoners were subjected to intense sun and heat in summer, and to rain and cold temperatures in winter. To show the prisons' intensity, a mother went to see her young son who had been held as a prisoner for months. The guards led her to her son. Upon seeing her son, she denied him and said "He's not my son. My son is white. This young man is of darker complexion. I don't know him." But after the son explained to her his markings, the mother was certain and began crying.

=== Hatred and persecution towards Shias ===
It is documented that Hajjaj had a particularly strong hatred towards Shias. It is also documented that Hajjaj's first public statement was: "What do people do on Eid al-Adha? A subject replied: People sacrifice lambs." He replied, "Very well then, from now on sacrifice anyone named Ali, Hasan, or Husain." To further show his hatred towards Shias, he also used to say publicly: "I wish I could have been there are Karbala, so I could have been the man who beheaded Husain ibn Ali when he was on the ground."

=== Kumayl reappears ===
Kumayl distanced himself from any political/Muslim affairs after the martyrdom of his best friend and teacher, Imam Ali. But when he heard that Hajjaj ibn Yusuf became governor, Kumayl took a stand. At the time Kumayl was either 82 or 83 years old.

=== The Revolt ===
Moreover, people (not just Shia's) hated him with a passion because he was unjust and wicked. For example, he wanted them to fight in war only to see them die, conquer land only to ransack them of their treasures, and he killed innocent people. They were tired of him ruling with an iron fist. This can be most famously seen in The Revolt of Abd al-Rahman ibn Muhammad ibn al-Ash'ath.

Hajjaj forced people to fight in war for his own personal benefit. One of these wars occurred in Turkey against the Turkish king Ratbil. He had sent Abd al-Rahman ibn Muhammad ibn al-Ash'ath to conquer Turkey. He won several battles against the Turks, thus allowing him to advance deeper into Turkey. Despite winning these battles, Abd al-Rahman noticed that his soldiers were tired of war and needed a break to boost their morale. He sent a letter of Hajjaj asking permission for a resting period. Despite the circumstances, Hajjaj cursed and ordered Abd al-Rahman and his army to continue fighting. Hajjaj's letter stated: "Very well, curse be on you and curse be on your soldiers." Upon reading the letter they became infuriated and decided to revolt against both Hajjaj and Abd al-Malik ibn Marwan. Abd al-Rahman replied to Hajjaj, "a man like you doesn't speak to me like this". Subsequently, when Abd al-Malik ibn Marwan heard this news, he told Abd al-Rahman "very well, I will remove Hajjaj and I will ensure that he does not stay in power". Abd al-Rahman replied "well you are the one that installed Hajjaj, therefore we will fight you".

As a result, Abd al-Malik ibn Marwan reinstated Hajjaj as governor of Kufa. With the intention to overthrow the government, Abd al-Rahman left Turkey and immediately gain a great deal of support, especially among the quras (Quran readers/reciters/teachers) who were the first to support him. Therefore, the quras formed their own battalion headed by Kumayl ibn Ziyad. Other supporters were, Kufians (who wanted to fight the persecution), poets, commoners, and religious jurists. They formed an army of over one hundred people, half of whom were foreigners who also faced persecution because they were treated as second class citizens by the Umayyads, who preferred Arabs to non-Arabs. Another notable warrior was Sa'id ibn Jubayr, a companion of Ali ibn Husayn. By 81 AH (700 CE), Abd al-Rahman and the rebels stormed Iraq and defeated Hajjaj's army. The downfall of Hajjaj's army freed many cities such as Sajestan, Kirman, and Fars all in Iran, and Basrah and Kufa in Iraq. Following the victory, Abd al-Malik ibn Marwan opened his doors to negotiations with Abd al-Rahman and the rebels. He accepted some terms such as removing Hajjaj from power. People rejoiced because of their freedom and victory by overthrowing Hajjaj. Now that they had defeated Hajjaj they felt that they could also remove Abd al-Malik as well. For this reason, Abd al-Malik sent military supplies and support to Hajjaj. In addition, the Khurasan (modern day Iran) army also joined to support Hajjaj.

=== The battle of al-Jamājum ===
In 82 AH (701–702 CE), Abd al-Rahman, Kumayl Bin Ziyad, Sa'id ibn Jubayr, and the rebels clashed against Abd al-Malik, Hajjaj, and the Khurasan army in what would become known as the Battle of al-Jamājum (Battle of Deer). It has been said to have been a violent, bloody battle. Unfortunately there little detail about this battle except that Abd al-Malik, Hajjaj, and the Khurasan army managed to defeat the rebels. Some rebels escaped and Abd al-Rahman, Kumail Bin Zyyad, and Sa'id ibn Jubayr avoided being captured. Abd al-Rahman fled back to Turkey. Those who were less fortunate, or who were captured, were executed by command of Hajjaj.

=== Capture and kill ===
After the Battle of al-Jamājum, Hajjaj, who was still the governor of Kufa, ordered that all the rebels who escaped from the battle were to be captured and brought back to be punished. The main bounties were placed on Abd al-Rahman, Kumayl Bin Ziyad, and Sa'id ibn Jubayr. Hajjaj was able to capture Sa'id ibn Jubayr. The following is a dialog between Hajjaj and Sa'id ibn Jubayr after he was captured and presented to Hajjaj in his palace.

Hajjaj: "What's your name?"
Sa'id: "My name is Sa'id (means happy) ibn Jubayr."
Hajjaj: "No from today, I will call you Shaqi (means unhappy/the worst/the angry) ibn Qusair (means the one who is broken)."
Sa'id: "That (referring to Sa'id) is the name my mother gave me Hajjaj."
Hajjaj: "May you and your mother both burn in hell."
Sa'id: "Who are you to tell me about hell and to tell me who will burn in hell."
Hajjaj: "I have more wealth than you will ever imagine I'll tell you if you go to hell or no."
Sa'id: "Well at least I will me next to my master Amir al-Momineen (Imam Ali) in heaven and I'm confident of that. And my master told me that I will be killed in this way."
Hajjaj: "May Allah curse your master as well." He laid down Sa'id and was about to behead him.
Sa'id: "Where ever your face turns, it turns towards Allah. From this ground we (a royal we; referring to Allah the one and only) created you and it is this ground we are going to return you (Allah) and you're going to raise from here (referring to the Day of Judgment)."

Hajjaj then executed Sa'id ibn Jubayr. After executing him, Hajjaj said the following:

Hajjaj: "Where is that lover of Abu Turab (Abu Turab is a title of Imam Ali)?"
Hajjaj's people: "Who?"
Hajjaj: "Kumayl ibn Ziyad al-Nakha'i, the lover of Ali ibn Abi Talib. The man who was loyal to him. Where is he know? He has the audacity to raise against me."
Hajjaj's people: "What do you what us to send the message?"
Hajjaj: "Go and tell the old man his wife and his daughters are in my prison and I enjoy having ladies in my prison. So tell him I will be waiting unless he wants his wife and his sisters and his daughter to be inflicted with more of my punishment."

It is also mentioned that Hajjaj ordered his forces to annoy/torture Kumayl's followers. For example, they deprived them of money leading to economic worries.

== Martyrdom ==
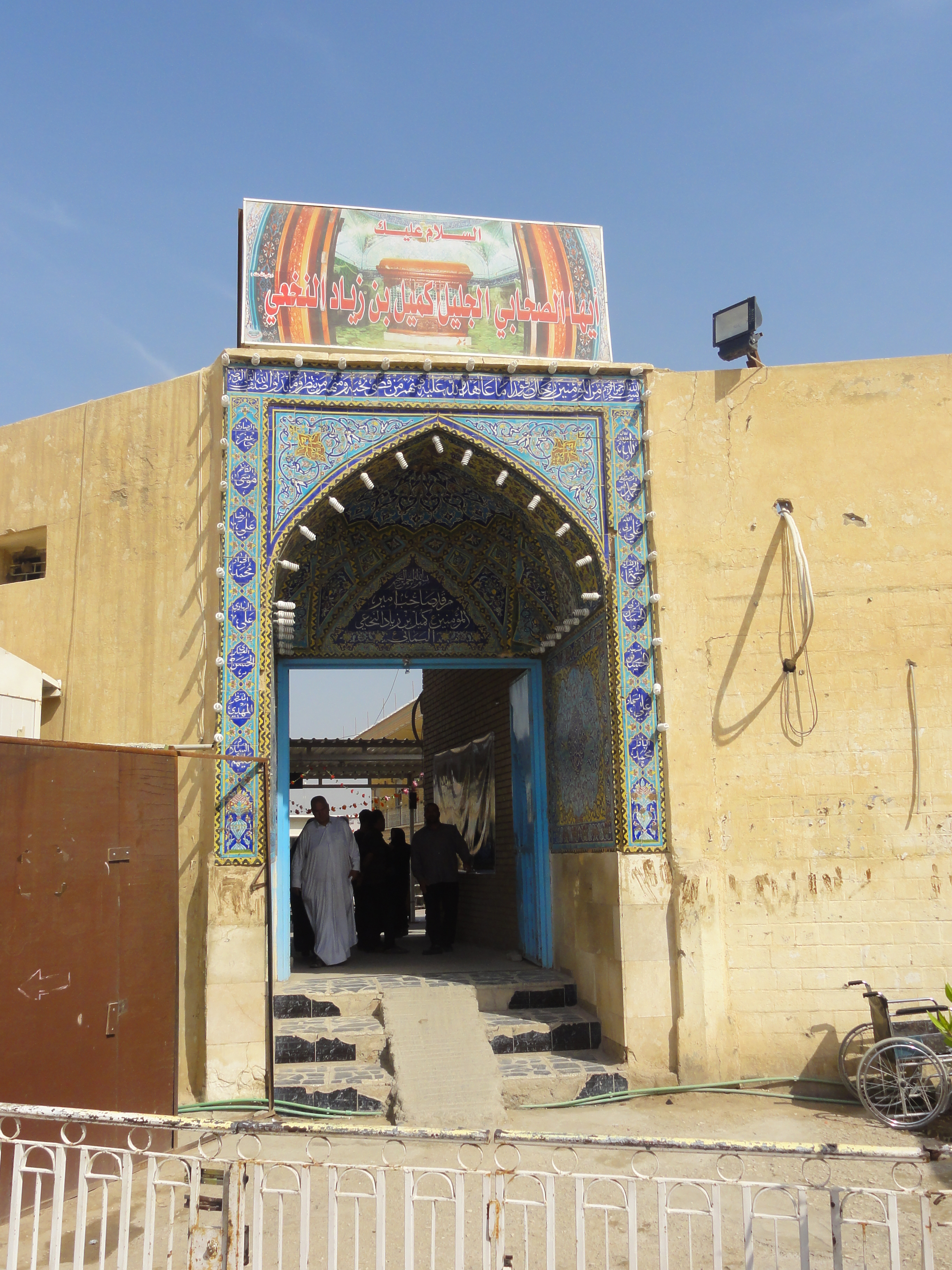

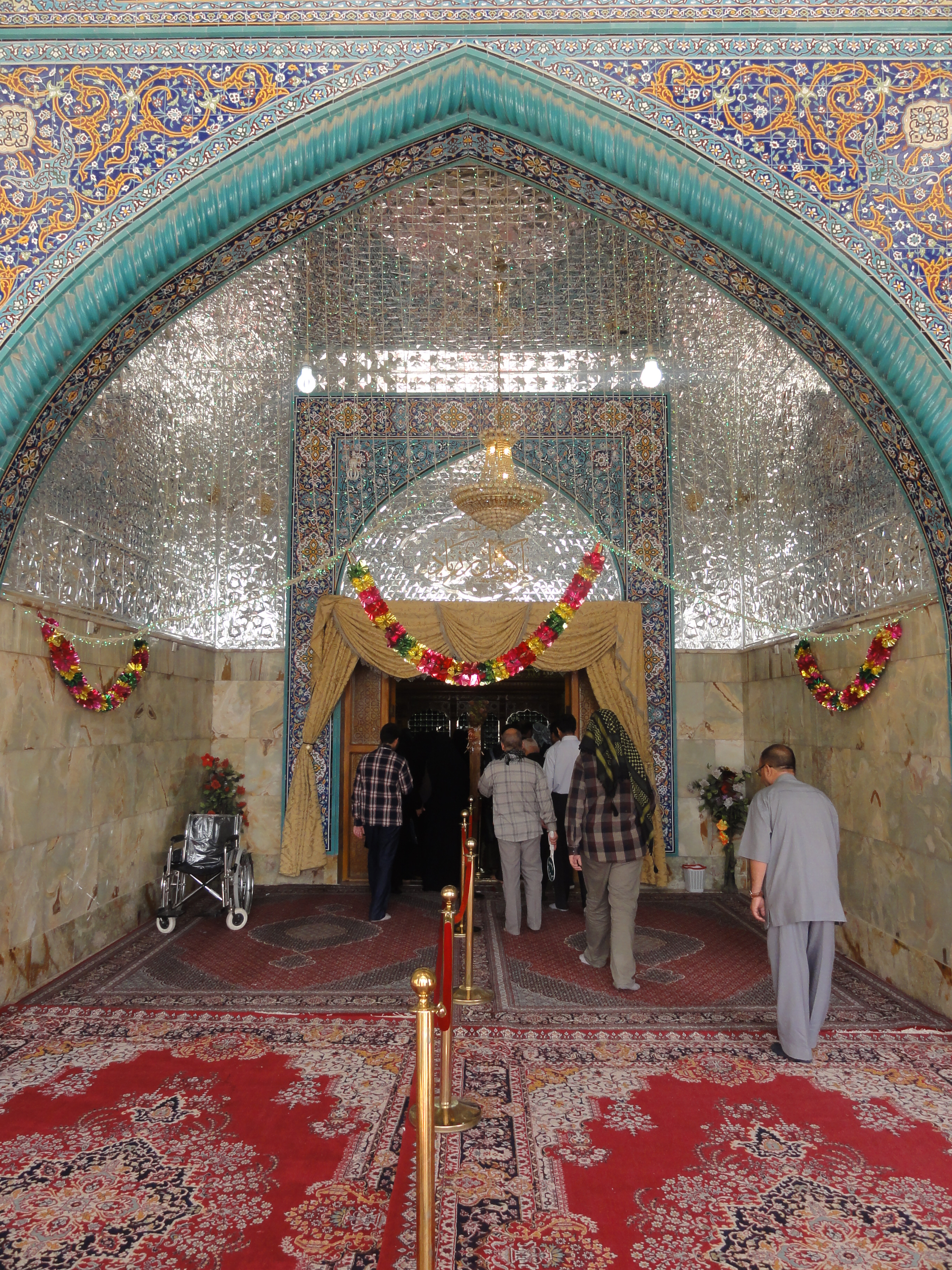

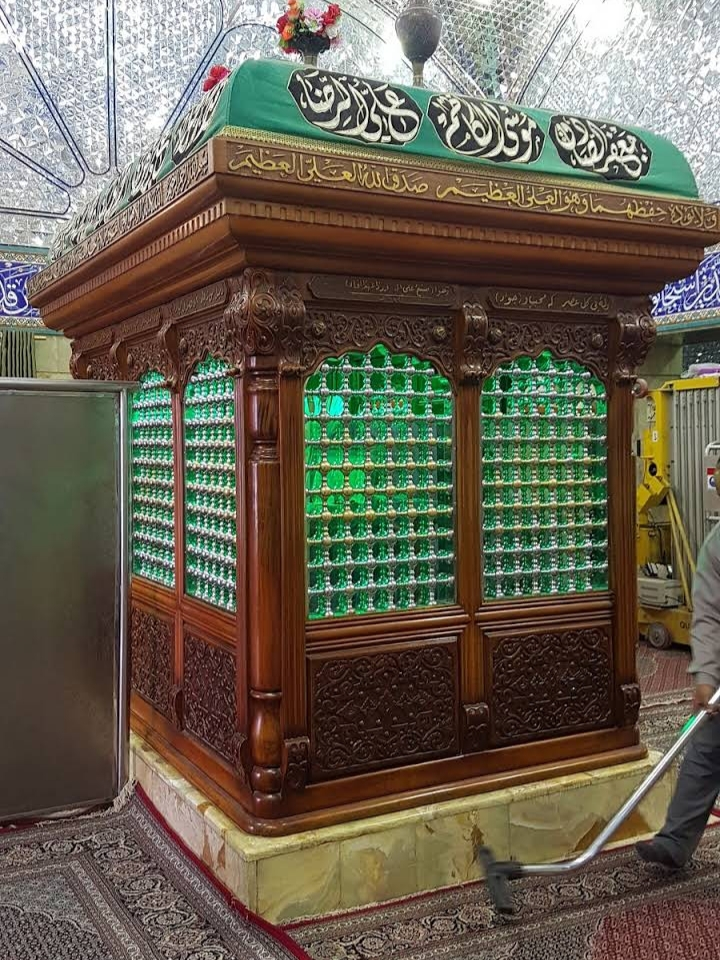

After hearing the news about the torture of his family members and friends, Kumayl decided the only thing to do was to turn himself in to save them from persecution. He got his walking stick, ready to turn himself in. People around him asked: "Kumayl, these people want you. Why don't you just hide." Kumayl replied, "No, no more. A man who insults my master (referring to Imam Ali) is not a man I hide from. Who dare the insult. He (referring to Hajjaj) says where are the lovers of Abu Turab (Imam Ali). I am a lover of Abu Turab." Nonetheless, Hajjaj's forces brought Kumayl to him at his palace. In the meantime, Kumayl began remembering his past. He remembered the days when he was a soldier in the army of Imam Ali. He remembered the time when he led a small group of 400 soldiers to combat a raid by Mu'awiya's army. He remembered disobeying Imam Ali (when leaving Hīt) and receiving a letter from Imam Ali. He remembered Imam Ali's words: "Kumayl, order your family to do good. Order them to help people at night." When presented to Hajjaj, Kumayl saw a headsman carrying a sword with guards (who surrounded Hajjaj). Kumayl knew that death was certain. But, before his death Hajjaj and Kumayl engaged in the following dialog.

Hajjaj: "So you are Kumayl ibn Ziyad al-Nakha'i?"
Kumayl: "Yes."
Hajjaj: "I heard stories about you. When you were younger, you spoke out against the great caliph Uthman. "
Kumayl: "Yes that's me."
Hajjaj: "And I heard you are the one who tried to speak out against Mu'awiya."
Kumayl: "Yes."
Hajjaj: "I heard you are the one who loves Ali ibn Abi Talib. You love Abu Turab."
Kumayl: "Yes, I love Abu Turab."
Hajjaj: "Curse be on you and on Abu Turab. Dissociate from Abu Turab and I will let you go."
Kumayl: "Show me a way better than Abu Turab's way. I will follow it. My master, Imam Ali [a] has told me that you will kill me. Allah's enemy, do whatever you like! And know that Judgement Day will be after killing."
Hajjaj: "Disown Ali to save your soul."
Kumayl: "Show me a religion better than Ali's."

Since Kumayl took a hardline stance over his love of Imam Ali, Hajjaj ordered the headsman to behead Kumayl. He was martyred at the age of 84 years.

== Legacy ==
Kumayl ibn Ziyad left a legacy with his words that he wrote down, his love for Imam Ali, and his stance against oppression and corrupt rulers. His life highlighted that one should be disciplined, firm, have faith in Allah (God), and sacrifice to keep the message of Allah (God) alive.

=== Shia ===
Many Shias recognize Kumayl ibn Ziyad for his obedience, discipline, and love for Imam Ali. Furthermore, they respect him as a companion who preserved the secrets of the world, teachings of Imam Ali, and several du'as including Du'a Kumayl, which is recited by Shias on Thursday nights.

=== Sunni ===
There are Sunni books of hadiths (reports) that accept Kumayl and respect him as a companion. Most see Kumayl as a good companion of Imam Ali.

== See also ==
- Du'a kumayl
- Abu Dharr al-Ghifari
- Ammar ibn Yasir
- Bilal ibn Rabah al-Habashi
- Habib ibn Muzahir
- Hujr ibn Adi
- Jabir ibn Abd-Allah
- Ja'far ibn Abī Tālib
- Malik al-Ashtar
- Maytham al-Tammar
- Miqdad ibn Aswad
- Sa'id ibn Jubayr
- Salman the Persian
- Sulaym ibn Qays
- Uwais al-Qarani

== Sources ==
- Du'a Kumayl
- "Justice and Remembrance: Introducing the Spirituality of Imam Ali" by Reza Shah-Kazemi
- "Justice and Remembrance: Introducing the Spirituality of Imam Ali" by Reza Shah-Kazemi part 2
- "A Probe Into the History of Ashura" by Dr. Ibrahim Ayati
- "Kumayl ibn Ziyad" by Kamal al-Syyed
- Du'a Sabah
- Ibn Sa'd, Muhammad (2012). Kitab at-Tabaqat al-Kabir, Volume VI: The Scholars of Kufa. Translated by Aisha Bewley. London: Ta-Ha Publishers. ISBN 9781842001240.
- Ibn Kathir, Abu al-Fida Ismail (2011). Winning the Hearts & Souls: Expeditions and Delegations in the Lifetime of Prophet Muhammad. Al-Bidayah wan-Nihayah. Vol. 5. Translated by Darussalam Research Division. Riyadh: Darussalam Publishers. ISBN 9786035000765.
- Madelung, Wilferd (1997). The Succession to Muhammad: A Study of the Early Caliphate. Cambridge University Press. ISBN 978-0521646963.
- Kennedy, Hugh (2004). The Prophet and the Age of the Caliphates: The Islamic Near East from the Sixth to the Eleventh Century. Routledge.
- Donner, Fred M. (2014). "Was Marwan ibn al-Hakam the First 'Real' Muslim". In Savant, Sarah Bowen; de Felipe, Helena (eds.). Genealogy and Knowledge in Muslim Societies: Understanding the Past. Edinburgh: Edinburgh University Press. pp. 105–114. ISBN 978-0-7486-4497-1.
- Della Vida, Giorgio Levi & Khoury, Raif Georges (2000). "ʿUthmān b. ʿAffān". In Bearman, P. J.; Bianquis, Th.; Bosworth, C. E.; van Donzel, E. & Heinrichs, W. P. (eds.). The Encyclopaedia of Islam, Second Edition. Volume X: T–U. Leiden: E. J. Brill. pp. 946–949. ISBN 978-90-04-11211-7.
