= Christina Laffin =

Canadian historian

Christina Laffin is an associate professor in the Department of Asian Studies at the University of British Columbia. She is also a Canada Research Chair in premodern Japanese literature and culture, and co-director at the Centre for Japanese Research. Her research interests include medieval travel diaries; women's education and socialization before 1600; poetic practices and waka culture; theories of travel, gender, and autobiography; noh theatre; and comparative approaches to medieval literature.

== Education ==
Laffin received her B.A. from the University of British Columbia in 1996. Following this, she spent a year at the University of Shiga Prefecture as a Monbushō Research Student in Women's History. She then studied at the University of Tokyo, receiving her M.A. in Japanese Literature in 1999. From there, she attended Columbia University where she completed her Ph.D. and M.Phil. in Japanese Literature. During her time in the program, she spent two years at the University of Tokyo as a foreign research scholar at the Historiographical Institute.

== Selected publications ==
=== Publications ===
- Rewriting Medieval Japanese Women: Politics, Personality, and Literary Production in the Life of Nun Abutsu. University of Hawai'i Press, January 2013, 272 pages.

=== Editor ===
- (Co-editor) Birth and Death in the Royal House: Selections from Fujiwara no Munetada's Chūyūki. Ithaca: East Asia Program, Cornell University Press, under review, 397 pages.
- (Co-editor) The Noh Ominameshi: A Flower Viewed From Many Directions. Ithaca: East Asia Program, Cornell University Press, 2003, 358 pages. Review: Stanca Scholz-Cionca, Asian Theatre Journal 22:1. 2005.
- (Managing Editor) Gender and Japanese History, ed. Wakita Haruko, Anne Bouchy, Ueno Chizuko, vol. 1 & 2. Osaka University Press, 1999, 1038 pages. Review: Sally A. Hastings, Monumenta Nipponica 56:1. Spring 2001.

=== Book chapters ===
- "The Nursemaid's Letter (Menoto no fumi, c. 1264)." In The Genji Reader, ed. Haruo Shirane and Thomas J. Harper, New York: Columbia University Press, in press, pp. 106–112.
- "Grappling with Women's Education: Gender and Sociality in Nun Abutsu's Menoto no fumi." In New Horizons in Japanese Literary Studies: Canon Formation, Gender, and Media, ed. Haruo Shirane. Bensey Shuppan, 2009, pp. 62–66.
- "Josei kyōiku to jendaa: Abutsu-ni Menoto no fumi o megutte." In New Horizons in Japanese Literary Studies: Canon Formation, Gender, and Media, ed. Haruo Shirane. Bensey Shuppan, 2009, pp. 68–72.
- "Kurisutīn do Pizan to Abutsu-ni no bungaku katsudō: Josei sakka no rekishiteki jōken o tō" (The Literary Activities of Christine de Pisan and Nun Abutsu: Reconsidering the Historical Conditions of Female Authors). In Nyūyōku, Koronbia daigaku no Nihon kenkyū (Japanese Studies at Columbia University, New York), ed. Imai Masaharu. Tsukuba University, 2001, pp. 193–202.
- "Inviting Empathy: Kagerō Nikki and the Implied Reader." In Gender and Japanese History, ed. Wakita Haruko, Anne Bouchy, Ueno Chizuko. Vol. 2. Osaka University Press, 1999, pp. 3–45.

=== Translations ===
- "Teishinkōki Year 939, Tengyō 2: A Classical Japanese Transcription." In Teishinkōki: The Year 939 in the Journal of Regent Fujiwara no Tadahira, ed. Joan R. Piggott and Yoshida Sanae. Ithaca: East Asia Program, Cornell University Press, 2008, pp. 82–147.
- "The Diary of the Sixteenth Night." In Traditional Japanese Literature, An Anthology, Beginnings to 1600, ed. Haruo Shirane. New York: Columbia University Press, 2006, pp. 778– 787.
- Ueno Kenji, "The Frolicking Animals and Humans Scroll: The Origins of Japanese Caricature." The Frolicking Animals and Humans Scroll. Kanzen Fukkoku Shiriizu. Maruzen, 2004, unpaginated scroll (approx. 7 pages).
- Imazeki Toshiko, "When Women Write: Examining the Gaps in Japanese Literary History." Annual Review of Gender Studies. Inaugural issue. Center for Gender Studies, Kawamura Gakuen Woman's University, 2003, pp. 73–77.
- Taizō Kuroda, "The Ban Dainagon-E: Commentary." The Ban Dainagon-E. Kanzen Fukkoku Shiriizu. Maruzen, 2003, unpaginated scroll (approx. 7 pages).
- Tanaka Takako, "Medieval Literature and Women: Focusing on Mumyōzōshi." Gender and Japanese History, ed. Wakita Haruko, Anne Bouchy, Ueno Chizuko. Vol. 2. Osaka University Press, 1999, pp. 99–129.
- Tabata Yasuko, "Female Attendants and Wives of the Medieval Warrior Class," Gender and Japanese History, ed. Wakita Haruko, Anne Bouchy, Ueno Chizuko. Vol. 2. Osaka University Press, 1999, pp. 313–347.

== Affiliations ==
- Association for Asian Studies
- Association for Japanese Literary Studies
- Chūko Bungakukai (Society for the Study of Mid-Ancient Literature)
- European Association for Japanese Studies
- Nikki Bungakukai (Society for the Study of Diary Literature)
- Waka Bungakukai (Society for the Study of Japanese Poetry)
