= Safina, Jordan =

Al Safina السفينة
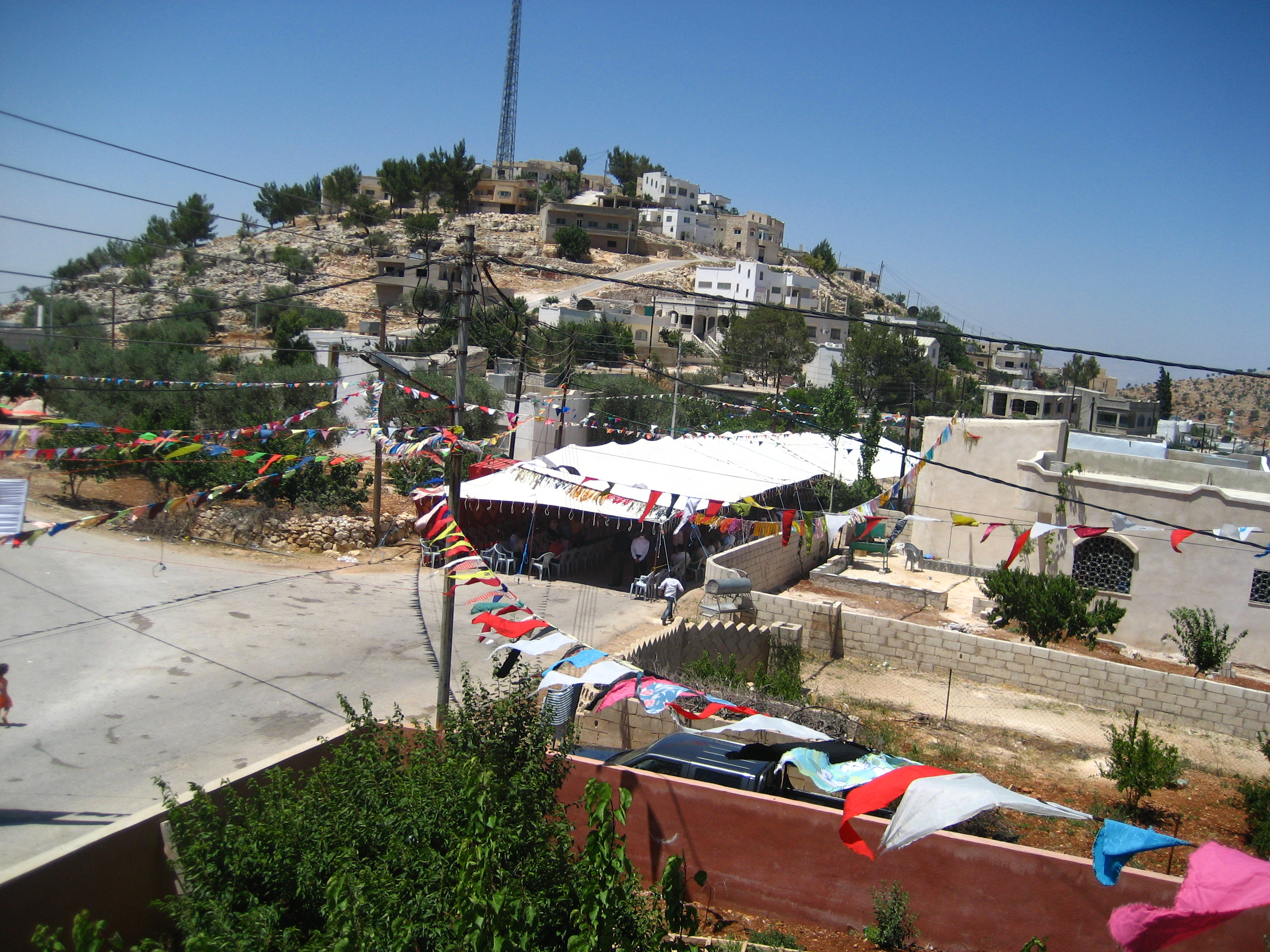

- Location in Jordan
- Coordinates: 32°15′14″N 35°42′34″E
- PAL: 218/184
- Country: Jordan
- Governorate: Ajloun Governorate

Population (2015)
  - Total: 1,584
- Time zone: UTC + 2

As-Safena (Arabic: السفينة) (al-Sāfinah) is a small village of approximately 1,584 people in the western Ajloun region of north Jordan. It is located in a remote, mountainous area about 10 km from the city of Ajloun. Safena comes from the Arabic word for ship, because the mountain the village stands on looks like a ship. The main sources of income are generally from jobs with the military or agriculture. The village consists of the Zreigat (Arabic: الزريقات) and the Ananza (Arabic: عنانزه) families.

== History ==
The Jordanian census of 1961 found 183 inhabitants in Safina.

== Education ==
As-Safena has three schools. The As-Safena Secondary School for Girls was built in 1998. It currently serves 150 females in grades 5th – Tawjihi and 50 students in Kindergarten. The As-Safena Secondary School for Boys serves males in grades 5th-Tawjihi, while the newly built As-Safena Primary School serves boys and girls grades 1st-4th.

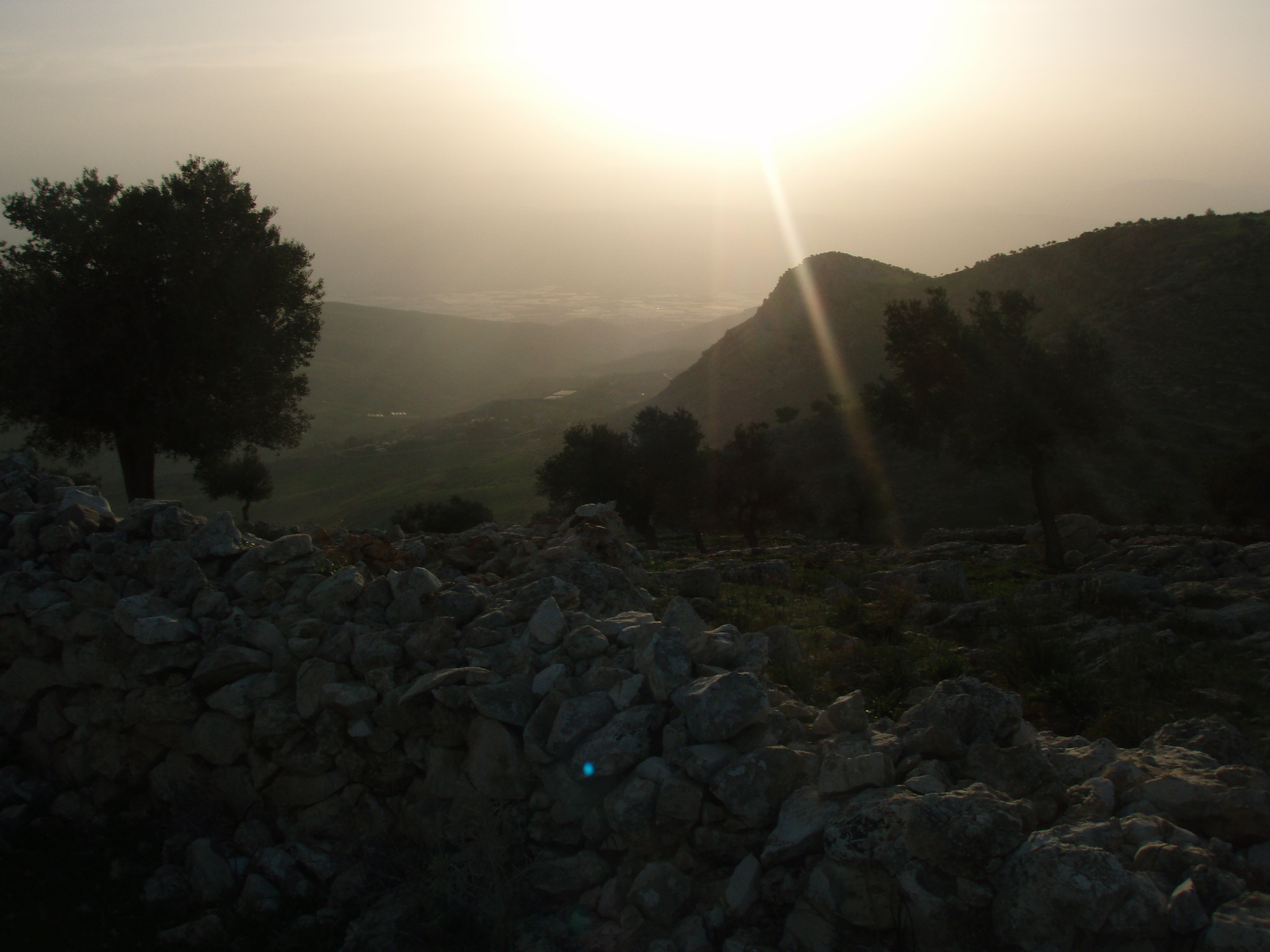
View of Jordan Valley from Safena

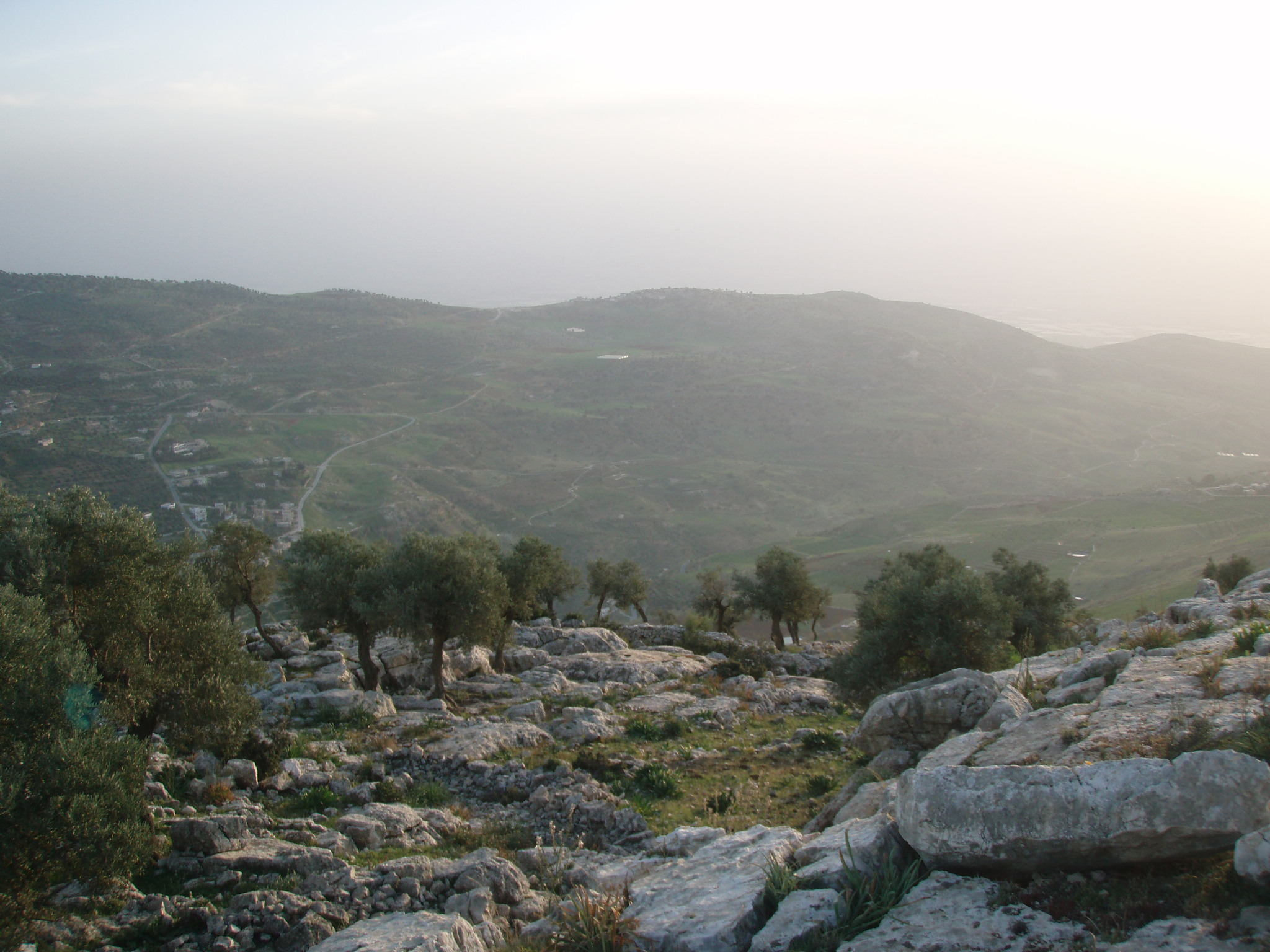
View of Rajib from Safena

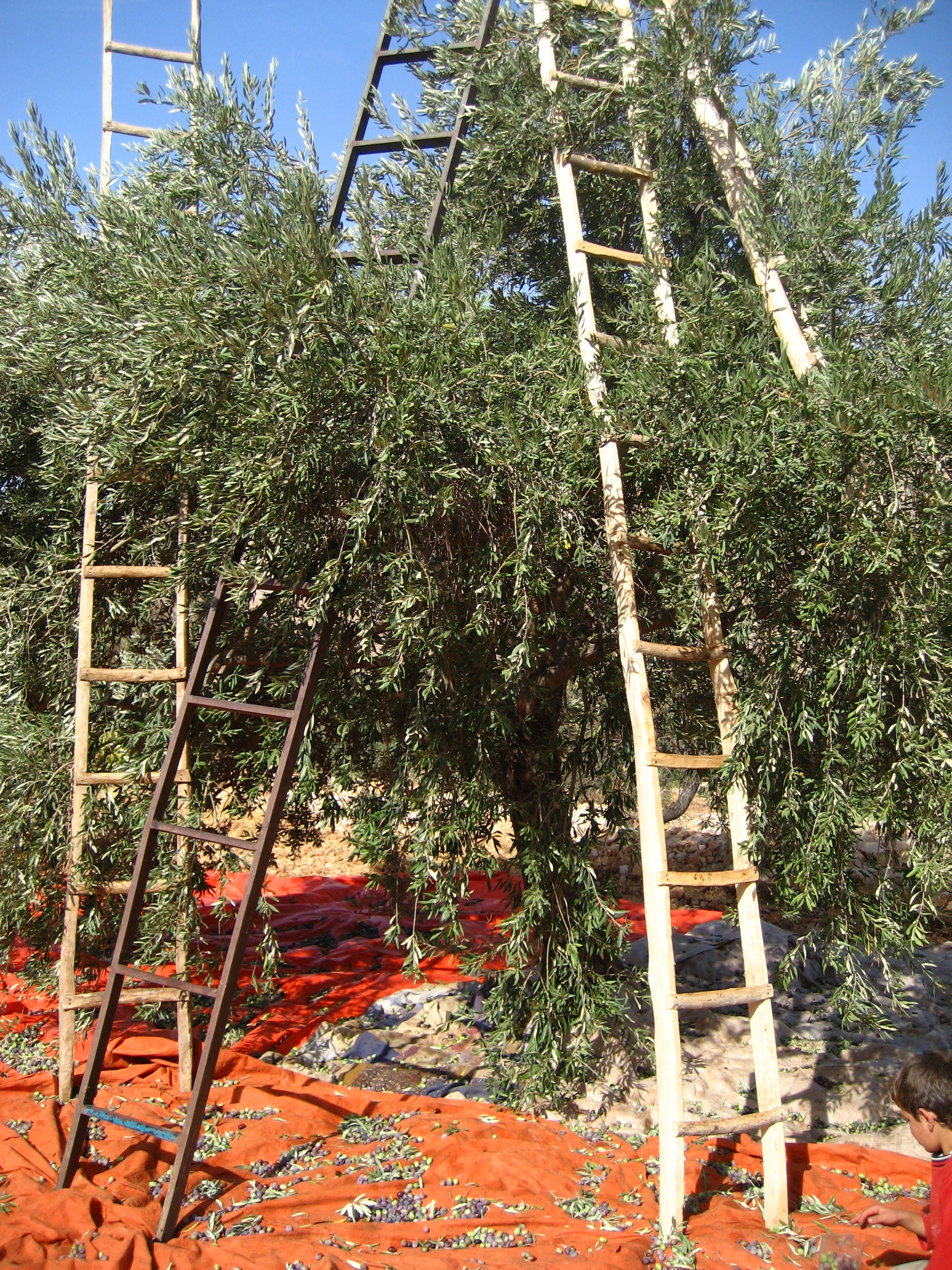
Olive farming is common in Safena

== Bibliography ==
- Government of Jordan, Department of Statistics (1964). First Census of Population and Housing. Volume I: Final Tables; General Characteristics of the Population (PDF).
