= Kufa =

Kufa الْكُوفَة
- City
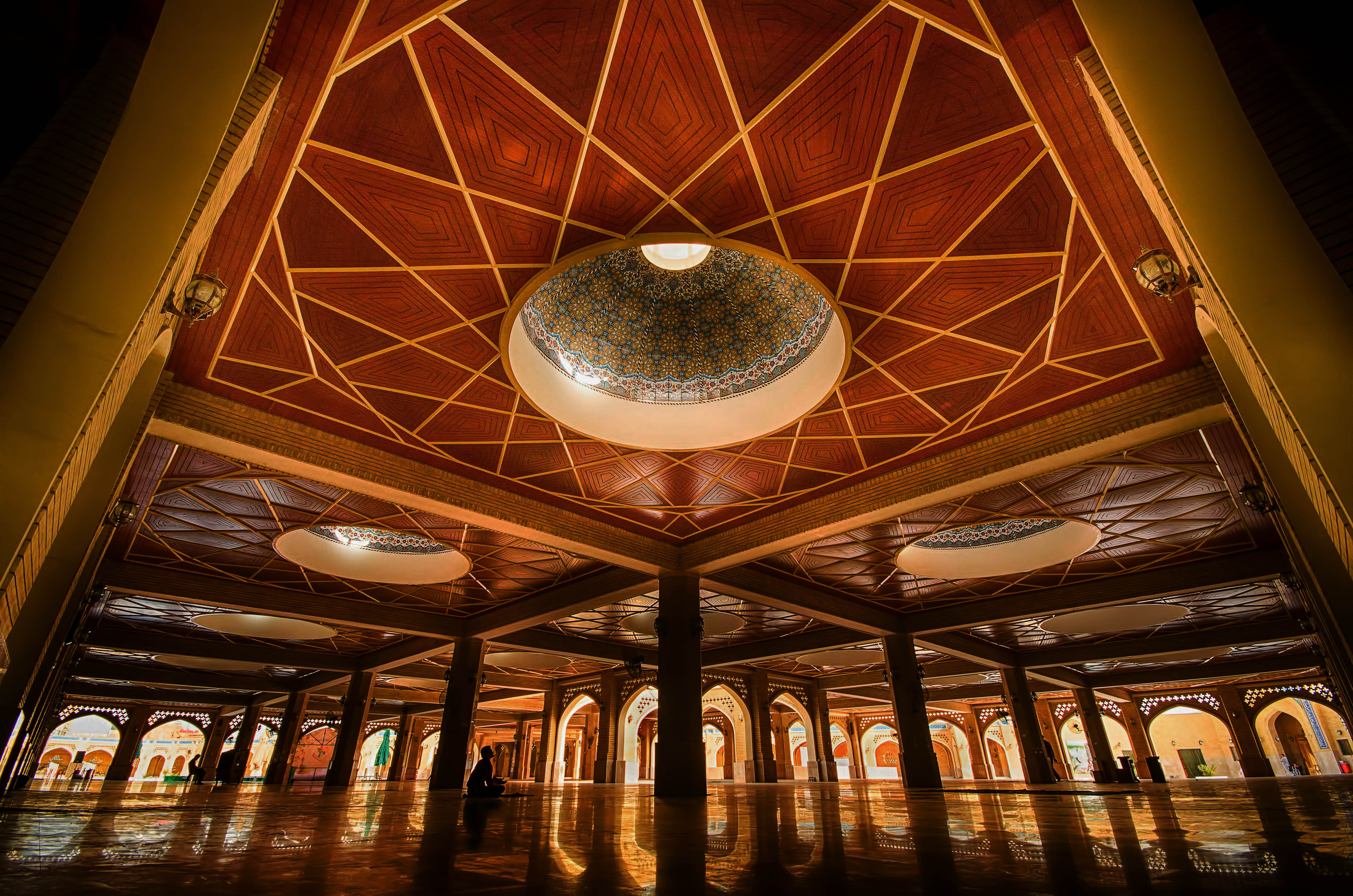
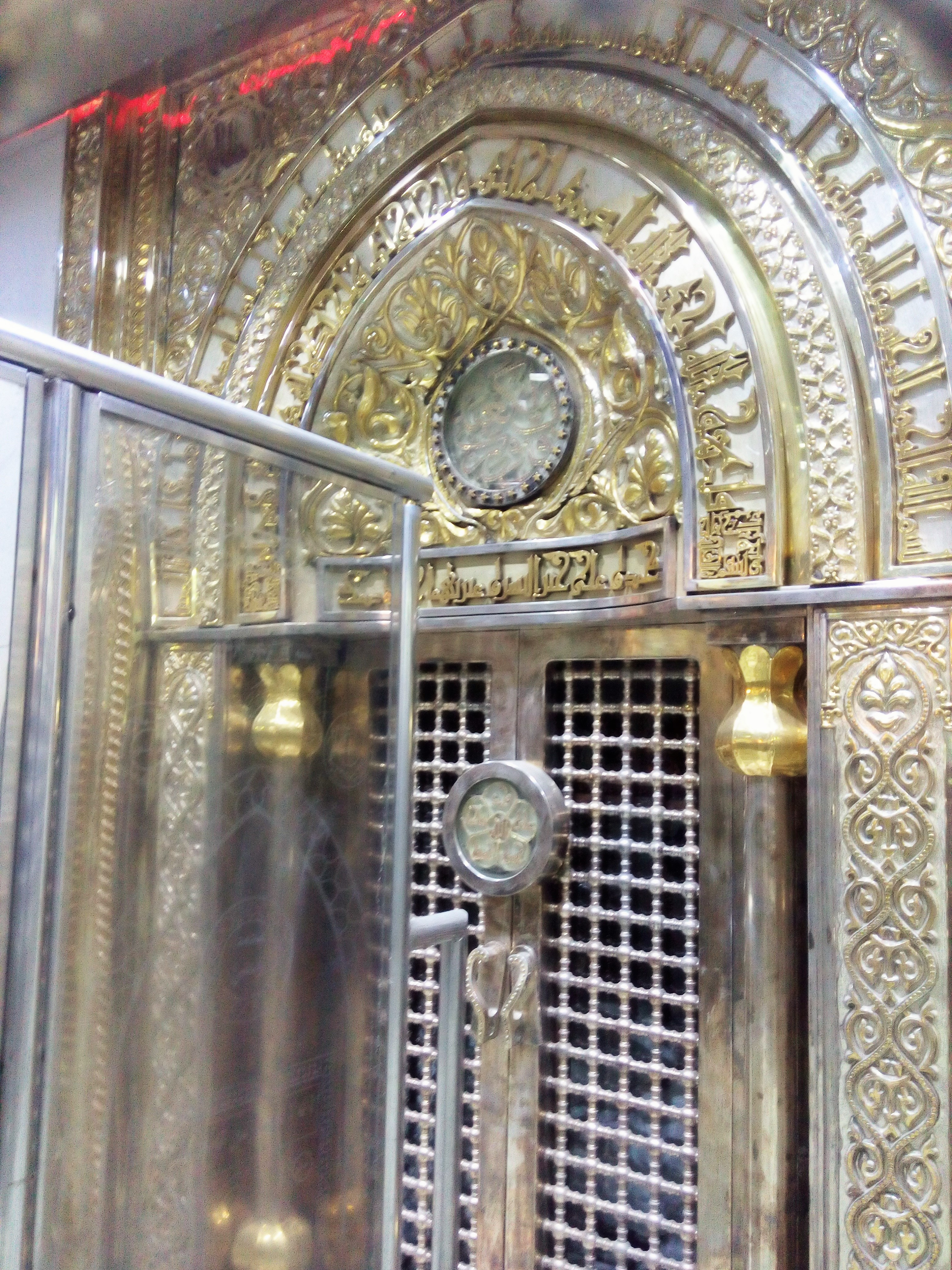
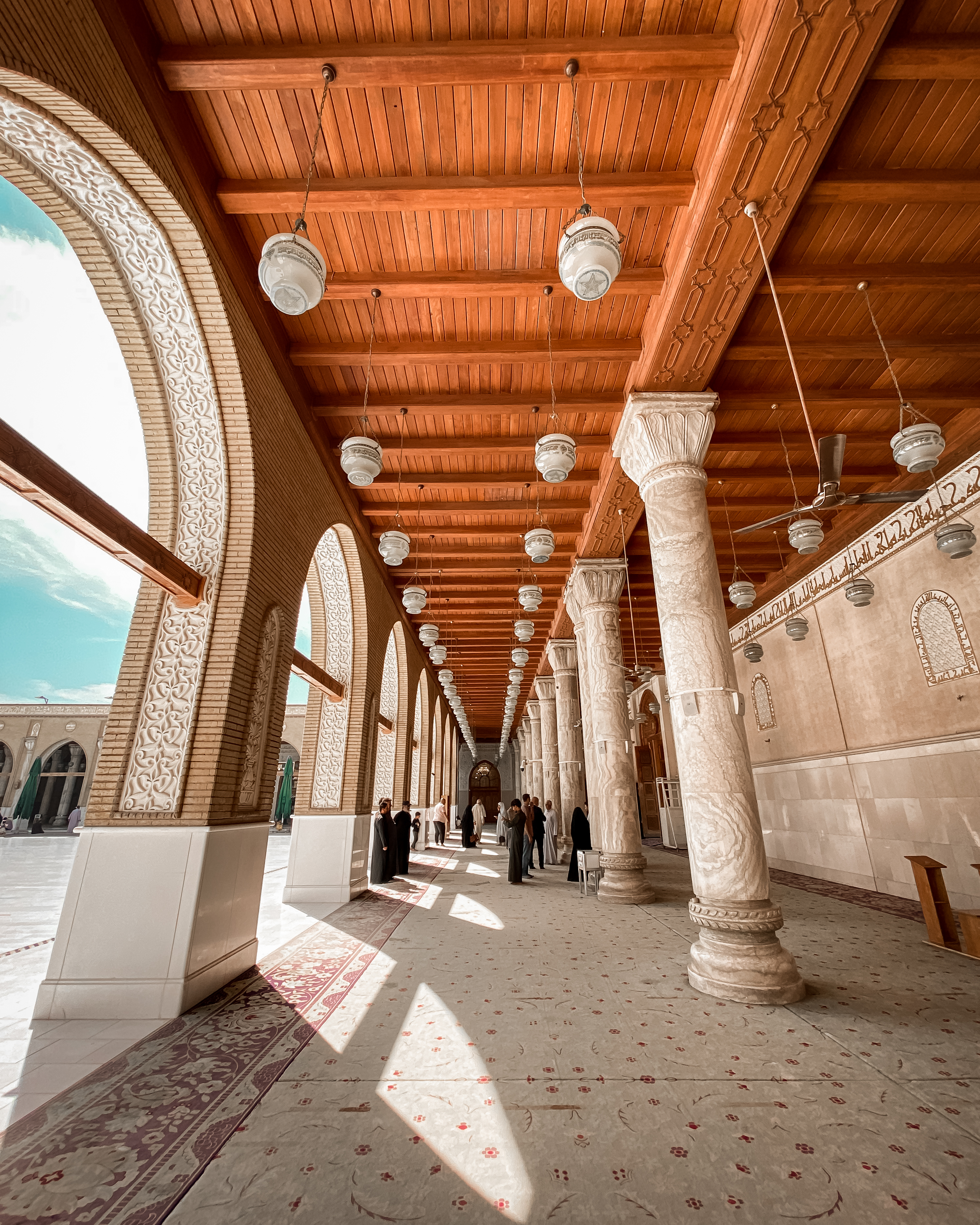
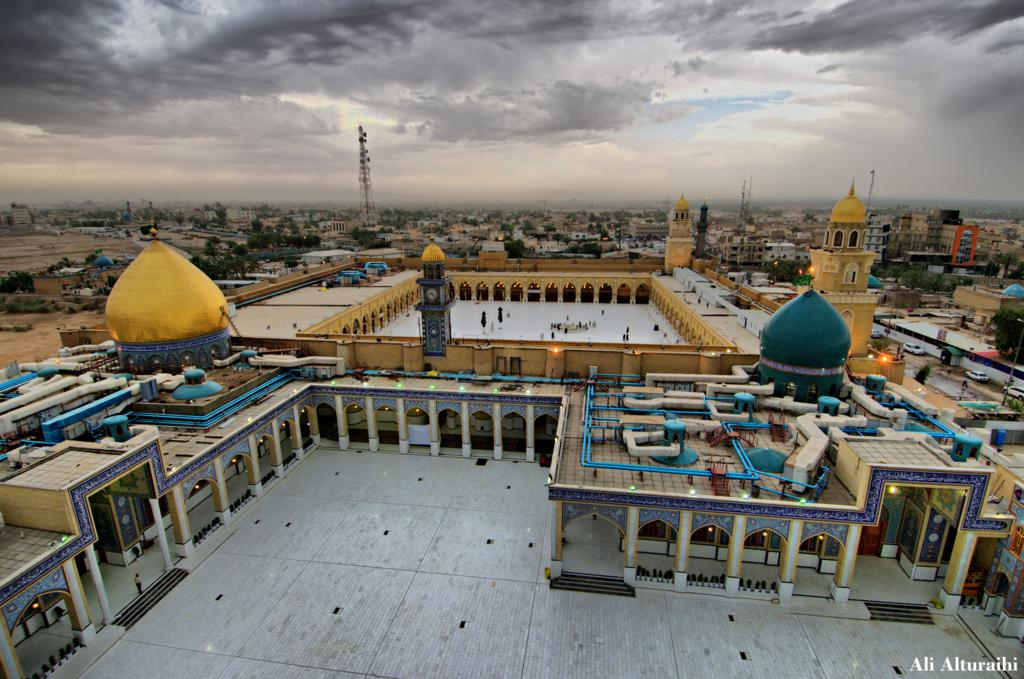

- Location of Kufa within Iraq
- Coordinates: 32°01′48″N 44°24′00″E
- Country: Iraq
- Governorate: Najaf

Area
  - Total: 50 sq mi (129 km^{2})

Population
  - Total: 230,000
  - Density: 4,600/sq mi (1,800/km^{2})
- Time zone: GMT+3

Kufa (Arabic: الْكُوفَة "al-Kūfah"), also spelled Kufah, is a city in Iraq, about 170 kilometres (110 mi) south of Baghdad, and 10 kilometres (6.2 mi) northeast of Najaf. It is located on the banks of the Euphrates River. The estimated population in 2003 was 110,000. Along with Najaf, Karbala, Mashhad, Kadhimiya, Samarra and Qom, Kufa is a holy city in Shia Islam.

The city was founded in 638 CE (17 AH) during the reign of the second Rashidun caliph, Umar. The Great Mosque of Kufa was home to Ali, the cousin and son-in-law of the Islamic prophet Muhammad, the first Shia Imam and the fourth Rashidun caliph. The mosque is also the site where he was assassinated. Kufa was the final capital of his caliphate.

The mosque also contains the shrine of Muslim ibn Aqil, his companion Hani ibn Urwa, and the revolutionary, Al-Mukhtar. Kufa was also the founding capital of the Abbasid Caliphate. During the Islamic Golden Age, it was home to the grammarians of Kufa. Kufic script is named for the city. Keffiyehs are sometimes mistakenly thought to have originated from Kufa.

== History ==
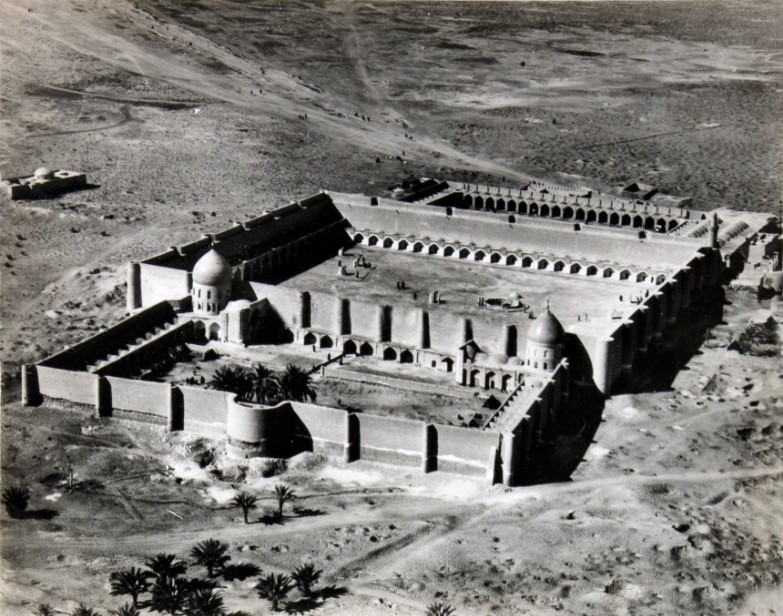
The Great Mosque of Kufa, 1915 CE

=== Establishment during Umar's era ===
After the Arabian hegemony and the fall of Persian Empire, and its geographic proximity to the imperial capital, Ctesiphon) at Battle of Al-Qadisiyyah in 636, Kufa was founded and given its name in 637–638 CE, about the same time as Basra. Kufa and Basra were the two amsar (garrison cities) of Iraq, serving as military bases and administrative centers. The Companion of the Prophet Saʻd ibn Abī Waqqas founded it as an encampment adjacent to the Lakhmid Arab city of Al-Hirah, and incorporated it as a city of seven divisions. Non-Arabs knew the city under alternate names: Hīrah and Aqulah, before the consolidations of ʻAbdu l-Mālik in 691. Umar, who assigned the land of the Jews in Arabia to his warriors, ordered the relocation of the Jews of Khaybar to a strip of land in Kufa, in 640. In the 640s, the Kufan commons were agitated that Umar's governor was distributing the spoils of war unfairly. In 642 ʻUmar summoned Saʻd to Medina with his accusers. Despite finding Sa'd to be innocent, Umar deposed him to avert ill feelings. At first, Umar appointed Ammar ibn Yasir and secondly Basra's first Governor Abū Mūsā al-Ashʻarī; but the Kufan instigators accepted neither. ʻUmar and the Kufans finally agreed on Al-Mughīrah ibn Shuʻbah.

The city was built in a circular plan according to the Partho-Sasanian architecture.

=== Uthman's era ===
==== Governorship of Al-Walid ====
Following Umar's death (644), his successor Uthman replaced Mughirah with Al-Walid ibn Uqba in 645. This happened while the Arabs were continuing their conquest of western Persia under Uthman ibn Abi al-As from Tawwaj, but late in the 640s, these forces suffered setbacks.

==== Setbacks and governorship of Abu Musa ====
Uthman in 650 reorganised the Iranian frontier; both Basra and Kufa received new governors (Sa'id ibn al-'As in Kufa's case), and the east came under Basra's command while north of that remained under Kufa's. The few but noticeable trouble makers in Kufa sought in 654 and had Sa'id deposed and instead showed satisfaction with the return of Abu Musa, which Uthman approved seeking to please all. Kufa remained a source of instigations albeit from a minority. In 656 when the Egyptian instigators, in co-operation with those in Kufa, marched onto the Caliph Uthman in Medina, Abu Musa counselled the instigators to no avail.

=== Ali's era ===
Upon Uthman's assassination by rebels, governor Abu Musa attempted to restore a non-violent atmosphere in Kufa. The Muslims in Medina and elsewhere supported the right of Ali ibn Abu Talib to the caliphate. In order to manage the military frontiers more efficiently, Ali shifted the capital from Medina to Kufa.

The people of Syria and their governor, Muawiyah, who seized the Caliphate for himself and his family by using the confusion caused by the assassination of Caliph Uthman and being disturbed by the brutal assassination of the Caliph Uthman, demanded retribution. As Muawiyah mounted his campaign to hold Ali responsible for the murder of Uthman, factions developed. In an already emotionally charged atmosphere, Muawiyah's refusal to give allegiance to Ali as the Caliph without Ali avenging Uthman first eventually, led to war.

While praying in the Great Mosque of Kufa, Ali was attacked by the Kharijite Abd-al-Rahman ibn Muljam. He was wounded by ibn Muljam's poison-coated sword while prostrating in the Fajr prayer.

=== Umayyad era ===
==== Governorship of Ziyad ====
Muawiyah I appointed Ziyad ibn Abihi as the governor of Kufa, after Hasan's migration to Medina, which was a peace treaty which dictated he abdicate his right to caliphate to avoid an open war among Muslims. Some of Hasan's followers, like Hujr ibn Adi, were unhappy with the peace treaty, and did not change their ways according to the edicts of the new Governor. This became increasingly noticeable, since it created a rebellion against the ruler. However, Ziyad ibn Abihi was an equally keen strategist and politician, and was able to put down all challenges posed by the rebels against his rule.

=== Revolts ===
Throughout the Umayyad era, as was the case since the inception of the city by Umar ibn Khattab, there were those among Kufa's inhabitants who were rebellious to their rulers. Yazid I was declared as the Second Umayyad Caliph which led to a rebellion among Kufans and they turned to Muhammad's grandson Husayn for help and leadership. Yazid appointed Ubayd Allah ibn Ziyad as the new Governor to put down the rebellion, and kill Husayn if he did not acknowledge his Caliphate, culminating in the Battle of Karbala. There was a period of relative calm during the short reign of Al-Mukhtar's rulership, and the Umayyad-era Governorship of Al-Hajjaj.

=== Abbasid era ===
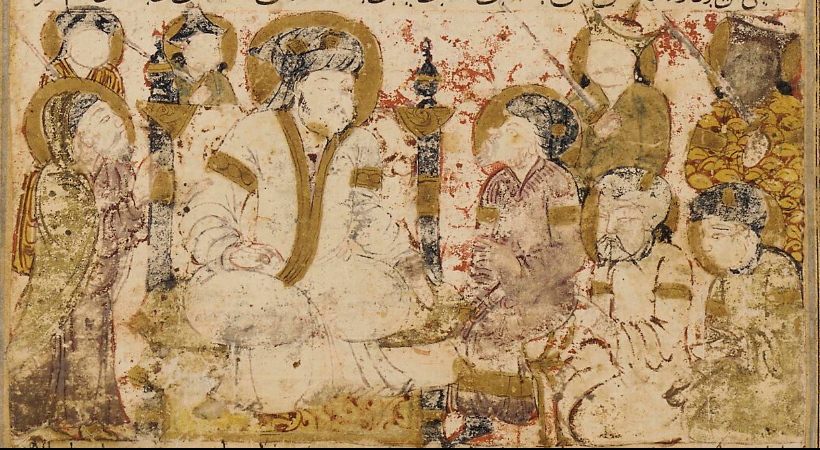
Folio from the Tarikhnama of Bal'ami depicting al-Saffah as he receives pledges of allegiance in Kufa

In 749, the Abbasids under al-Hasan ibn Qahtaba took Kufa and made it their capital. In 762, they moved their seat to Baghdad. Under the Umayyad and early Abbasid decades, Kufa's importance gradually shifted from caliphal politics to Islamic theory and practice. The city was sacked by the Qarmatians in 905, 924, and 927, and it never fully recovered from the destruction.

==== Kufa in Islamic theology and scholarship ====
Wael Hallaq notes that by contrast with Medina and to a lesser extent Syria, in Iraq there was no unbroken Muslim or Ishmaelite population dating back to the prophet Muhammad's time. Therefore, Maliki (and Awza'i) appeals to the practice amal of the community could not apply. Instead the people of Iraq relied upon those Companions of Muhammad who settled there, and upon such factions from the Hijaz whom they respected most. A primary founder of a Sunni school of thought, Abu Hanifa, was a Kufan who had supported the Zaydi Revolt in the 730s; and his jurisprudence was systematised and defended against non-Iraqi rivals (starting with Malikism) by other Kufans, such as al-Shaybani.

Shirazi's "Tabaqat", which Hallaq labels "an important early biographical work dedicated to jurists", covered 84 "towering figures" of Islamic jurisprudence; to which Kufa provided 20. It was therefore a center surpassed only by Medina (22), although Basra came close (17). Kufans could claim that the more prominent of Muhammad's Companions had called that city home: not only Ibn Abu Waqqas, Abu Musa, and Ali; but also Abd Allah ibn Mas'ud, Salman the Persian, Ammar ibn Yasir, and Huzayfa ibn Yaman. Among its jurists prior to Abu Hanifa, Hallaq singles out Sa'id ibn Jubayr, Ibrahim al-Nakha‘i, and Hammad ibn Abi Sulayman; and considers Amir al-Sha‘bi a pioneer in the science of judicial precedent.

During the 8th century, Kufa was home to scholars such as Imam Abu Hanifa and Imam Sufyan al-Thawri

The Shia theology started in the city of Kufa. Many preachers claimed to be students of the Medina based Imam Muhammad al-Baqir and his son Imam Ja'far al-Sadiq, although Sunni scholars question the truthfulness of these preachers. Originally it was divided into various sects, some of which lent support to the rebellions of Zayd ibn Ali and Abbasids.

Kufa was also among the first centers of Qur'anic interpretation, which Kufans credited to the exegete Mujahid (until he escaped to Mecca in 702). It further recorded general traditions as Hadith; in the 9th century, Yahya ibn ‘Abd al-Hamid al-Himmani compiled many of these into a Musnad.

Given Kufa's opposition to Damascus, Kufan traditionists had their own take on Umayyad history. The Shia historian Abu Mikhnaf al-Azdi (d. 774) compiled their accounts into a rival history, which became popular under Abbasid rule. This history does not survive but later historians like Tabari quoted from it extensively.

Kufa is also where the kufic script was developed, the earliest script of the Arabic language. As the scholar al-Qalqashandi maintained, "The Arabic script [khatt] is the one which is now known as Kufic. From it evolved all the present hands." The angular script which later came to be known as Kufic had its origin about a century earlier than the founding of the town of Kufa, according to Moritz in the Encyclopaedia of Islam. The kufic script was derived from one of the four pre-Islamic Arabic scripts, the one called al-Hiri (used in Hirah). (The other three were al-Anbari (from Anbar), al-Makki (from Mecca) and al-Madani (from Medina)). Ibn al-Nadim (died c. 999) the author of the famous Kitab al-Fihrist, an index of Arabic books, dedicates the a section of the first chapter to calligraphy.

=== Post-Abbasid history ===
Kufan coins were among the numerous silver coins of various origins found in 1989 by the mouth of Dvina, right next to Arkhangelsk in the extreme north of Russia. The Kufan coins were the only non-European ones in the hoard, and testify to the very wide-ranging indirect trading links which Kufa had at one time. It is estimated the hoard was buried in the beginning of the 12th century, when Kufa was already long past the peak of its fortunes, but the coins might have arrived at the far north at a much earlier time.

Kufa began to come under constant attack in the 11th century and eventually shrank and lost its importance. Over the last century, the population of Kufa began to grow again. It continues to be an important pilgrimage site for Shi'ite Muslims.

== Geography ==
Kufa is located on the banks of the Euphrates River. It is 170 kilometres (110 mi) south of Baghdad, and 10 kilometres (6.2 mi) northeast of Najaf.

== Religious significance ==
The town has produced several Shi'ite Muslim scholars. It also contains several sites of importance to Shi'ites:

- The Great Mosque of Kufa was constructed in the middle of the 7th century, after the Caliph Umar established the city. The mosque contains the remains of Muslim ibn Aqeel—first cousin of Husayn ibn Ali, his companion Hani ibn Urwa, and the revolutionary Al-Mukhtar. The Mosque also contains many important sites relating to Prophets and Ali ibn Abi Talib, including the place where he was fatally struck on the head, while in Sujūd (Arabic: سُجود, 'prostration').
- Ali's house
- The tomb of Zayd ibn Ali
- Al-Hannanah Mosque, which contains some of the skin that was ripped off Husayn posthumously by his adversaries
- The tomb of Maytham al-Tammar
- The tomb of Kumayl ibn Ziyad
- Al-Sahlah Mosque, which is associated with the Twelfth Imam of the Twelver Shia

== Culture ==
=== Sports ===
Kufa is home to Al-Kufa SC, that plays in the second division of the Iraqi football league system, namely Iraqi Premier Division League. Its home stadium is the An-Najaf Stadium.

== Notable figures ==
- Ali ibn Abi Talib
- Asbat ibn Muhammad
- Mukhtar al-Thaqafi
- Muslim ibn Aqeel
- Al-Kindi
- Abu Hanifa
- Sufyan al-Thawri
- Alqama ibn Qays
- Dawud al-Zahiri
- Abd Allah ibn Mas'ud
- Abd-Allah ibn Aamir Hadhrami
- Al-Aswad ibn Yazid
- Masruq ibn al-Ajda'
- Jabir ibn Hayyan
- Al-Qa'qa' ibn Amr al-Tamimi

== See also ==
- Al-Hirah
- Ghurabiyya Shia
- Great Mosque (Kufa)
- Arfaja al-Bariqi
- Shiism

== Bibliography ==
- Crone, Patricia. Roman, Provincial and Islamic Law: The Origins of the Islamic Patronate. Cambridge University Press, paperback ed. 2002
- Hallaq, Wael. The Origins and Evolution of Islamic Law. Cambridge University Press, 2005
- Hawting, Gerald R. The First Dynasty of Islam. Routledge. 2nd ed, 2000
- Hinds, Martin. Studies in Early Islamic History. Darwin Press, 1997
- Hoyland, Robert G. Seeing Islam as Others Saw It. Darwin Press, 1997
- Tillier, Mathieu. Les cadis d'Iraq et l'État abbasside (132/750-334/945). Institut Français du Proche-Orient, 2009
