= Yuliya Safina =

Russian handball player (born 1950)

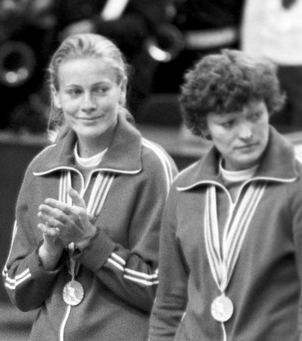
- Safina (right) at the 1980 Olympics

Personal information
- Born: 1 July 1950 (age 76) Smirnovo, Altai Krai, Russia
- Height: 178 cm (70 in)

Sport
- Sport: Handball

Senior clubs
- Years: Team
- –: Metallurh Brovary
- –: Azot Nevinonysk
National team
- Years: Team
- –: Soviet Union
Medal record
Representing the Soviet Union
Olympic Games
Gold medal – first place	1980 Moscow	Team
World championships
Gold medal – first place	1982 Hungary	Team

Yuliya Vasilyevna Safina (Russian: Юлия Васильевна Сафина, born 1 July 1950) is a retired Russian handball player. She won gold medals with the Soviet teams at the 1980 Olympics and 1982 World Championships.
