= Mausoleum of Sayyid Ali al-Zaki =

Historic shrine in Al-Kahla, Maysan, Iraq

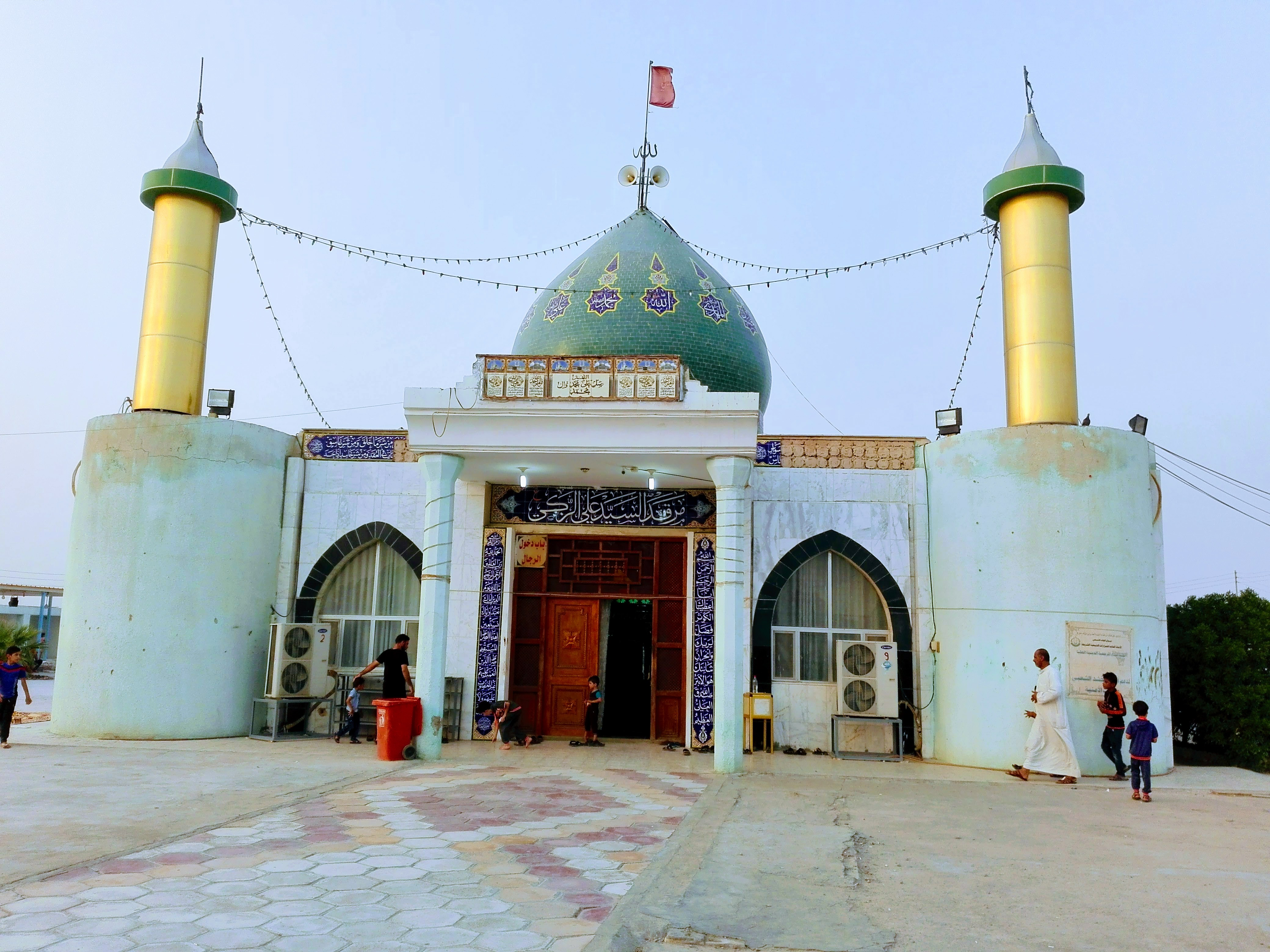

Religion
- Affiliation: Shi'a
- Province: Maysan Governorate

Location
- Location: Al-Kahla, Maysan, Iraq

Architecture
- Type: mausoleum
- Style: Modern
- Completed: 2017 (original building is from the 10th or 11th century)

Specifications
- Dome: 1
- Minaret: 2

The Mausoleum of Sayyid Ali al-Zaki (Arabic: ضريح كميل بن زياد) is a shrine located in the Al-Kahla district of Maysan, Iraq. It is dedicated to Sayyid Ali ibn al-Hasan, a distant descendant of Ali ibn Abi Talib, who was an ascetic and worked as an Islamic scholar of the 10th century. The current building is a modern structure from the year 2017, although an 11th century construction has also existed at the site before the modern reconstruction.

== History ==
After the death of Sayyid Ali in the 10th or 11th centuries, a shrine was built at his grave during the rule of the Buyid Dynasty. The shrine remained in disrepair ever since then, but it was cared for by the locals. In 2017, the shrine underwent a complete reconstruction from the ground up, and was extensively renovated. This new restoration was ordered by the General Secretary of Shi'ite shrines, who also funded the reconstruction for this shrine.

== Architecture ==
The mausoleum has two minarets flanking the entrance, and it has a single dome. The tomb of Sayyid Ali is located underneath the dome, and constructed around his grave is a zarih made from wood and metals such as copper and silver.

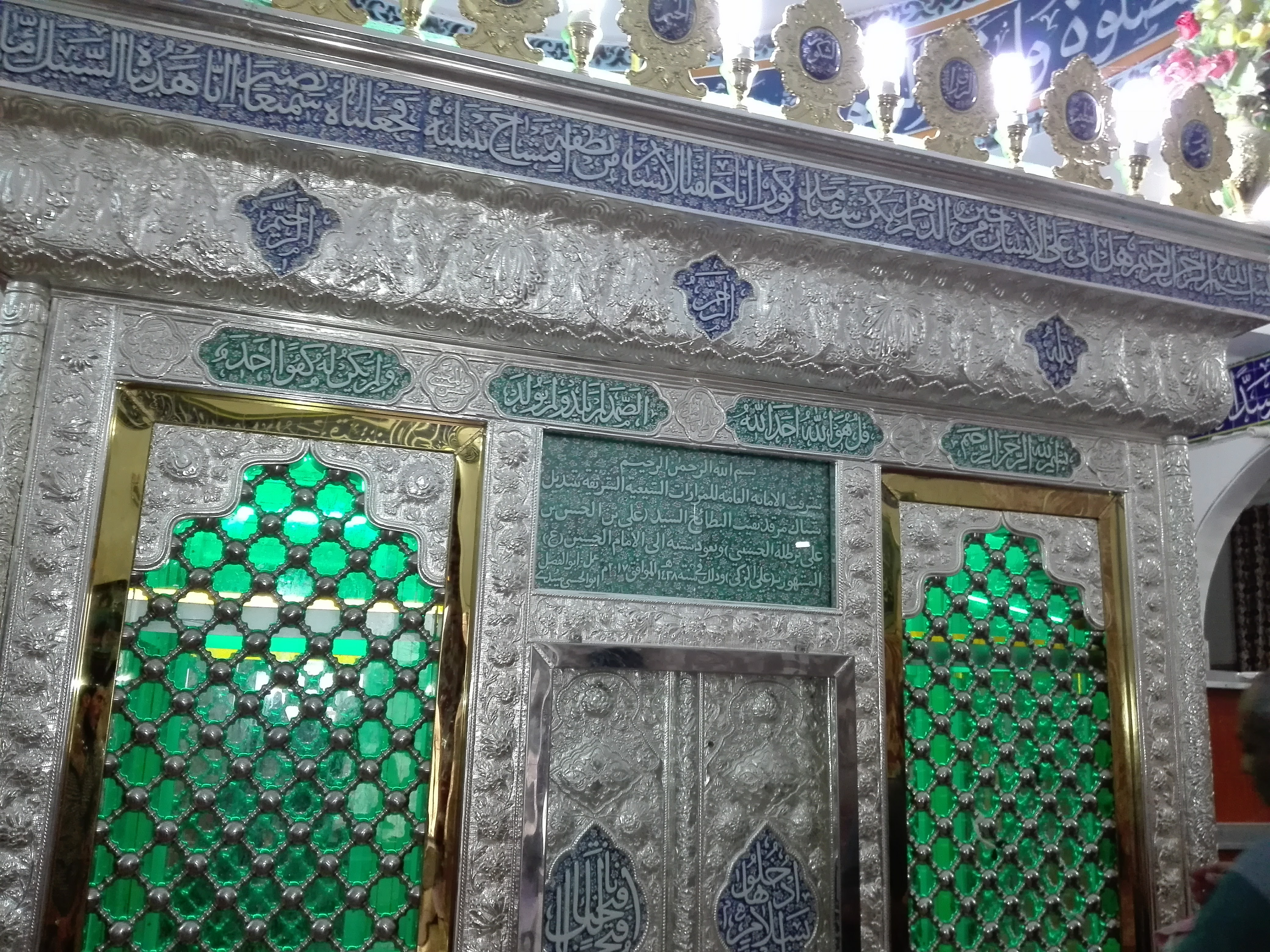
The zarih around the grave of Sayyid Ali inside the mausoleum

== Gallery ==
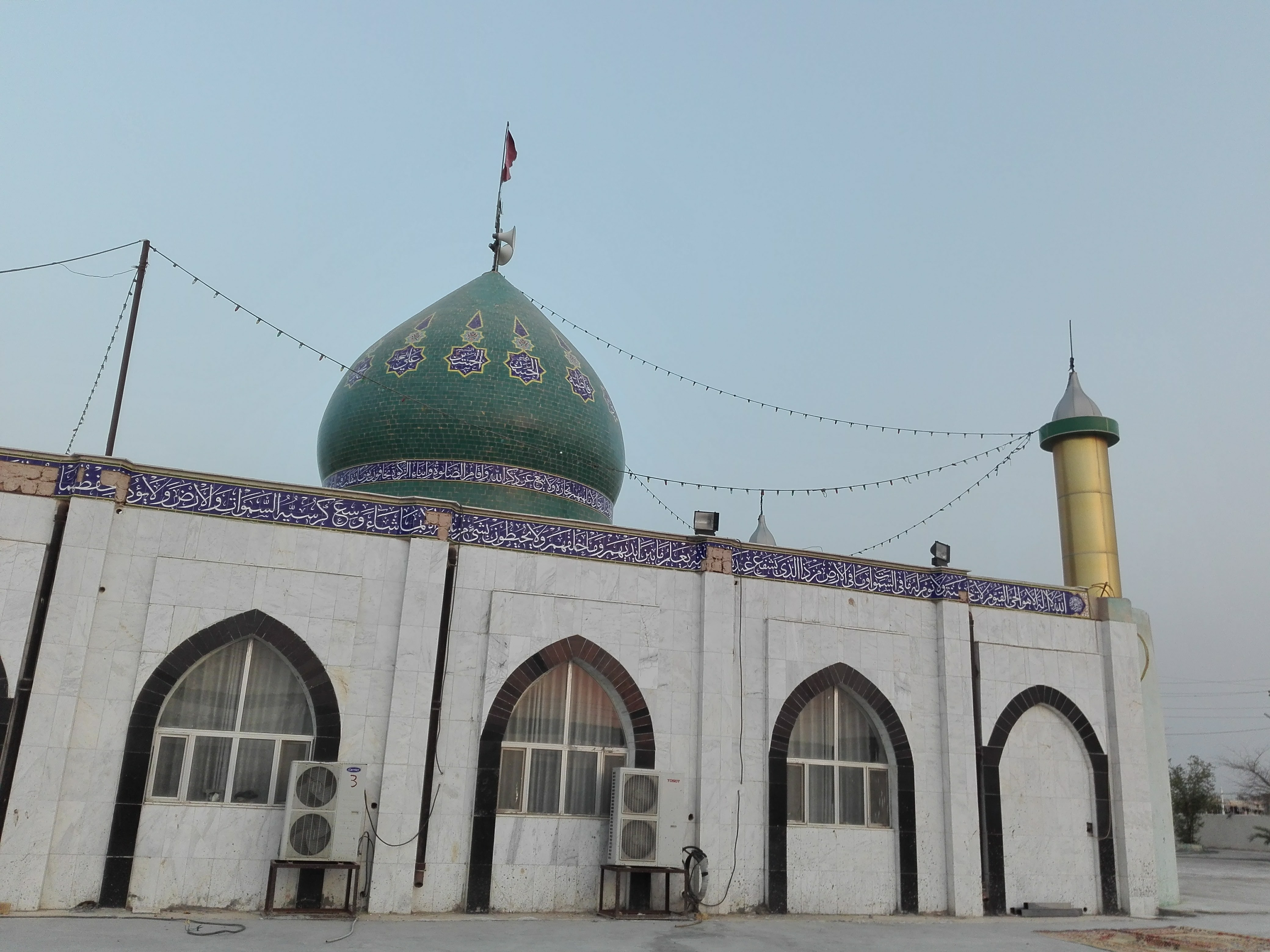
Exterior of the mausoleum

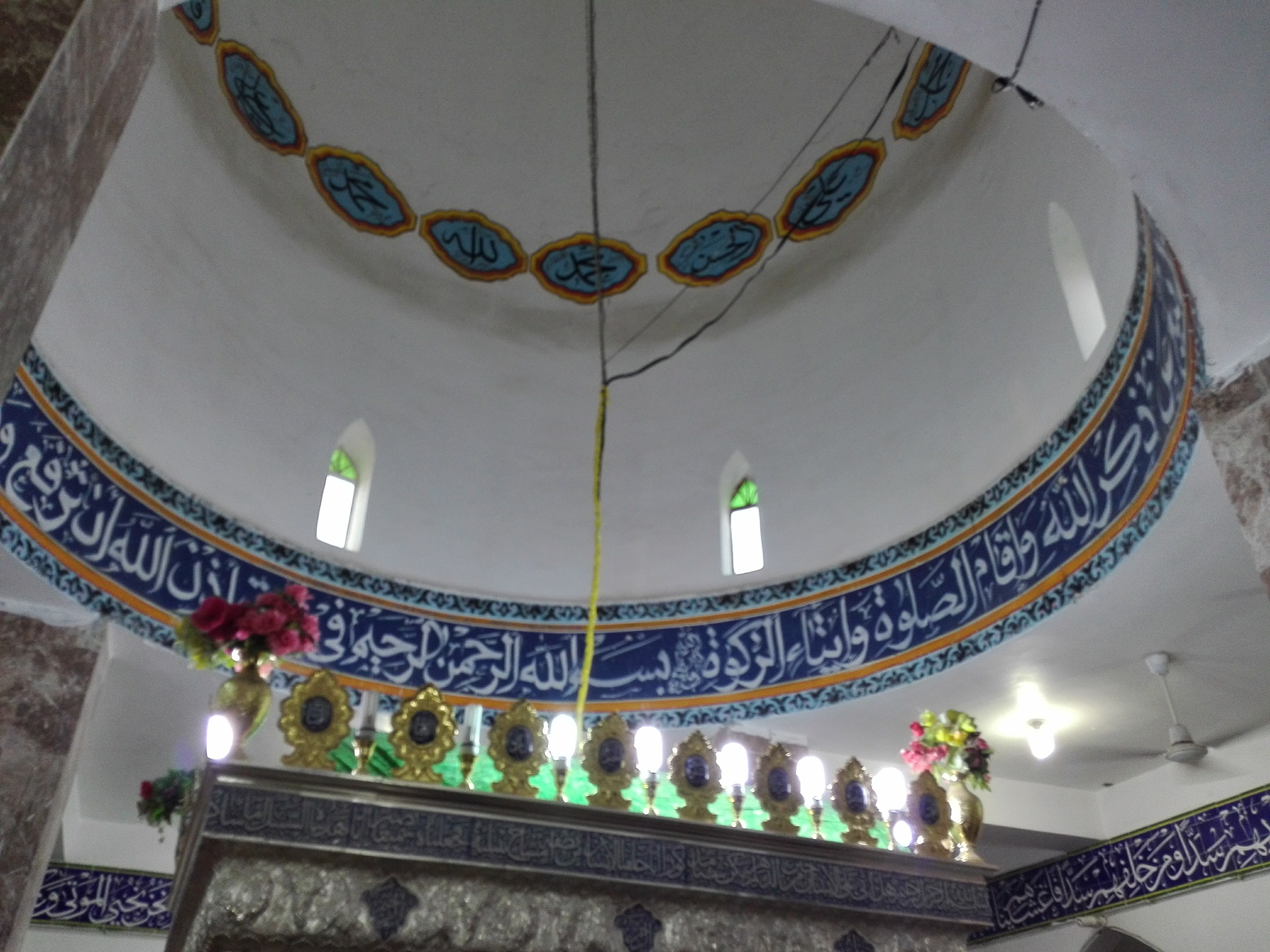
Closeup of the interior of the dome

The grave of Sayyid Ali within the zarih

== See also ==
- Imamzadeh
- List of mosques in Iraq
