= Sayyida Zaynab Mosque =

Sayyida Zaynab Mosque may refer to these mosques dedicated to Zaynab bint Ali, the granddaughter of the Islamic prophet Muhammad:

- Sayyida Zainab Mosque, Cairo in Sayyidah Zainab District, Cairo, Egypt
- Sayyida Zaynab Mosque, Syria in Damascus, Syria
- Sayyidah Zaynab Mosque (Sinjar) in Sinjar, Iraq
