= Timeline of Sulaymaniyah =

The following is a timeline of the history of the city of Sulaymaniyah, Iraqi Kurdistan.

== Prior to 20th century ==
- 1784 - 14 November: Sulaymaniyah founded.
- 1785 - Great Mosque built
- 1851 - Sulaymaniyah was joined to Shahrizor Eyalet.

== 20th century ==
- 1918 - Sulaymaniyah occupied by British forces on November.
- 1937 - Public Park opens.
- 1944 - Library of Sulaymaniyah established.
- 1956 - Al-Sulaymaniyah FC (football club) formed.
- 1961 - Sulaymaniyah Museum established.
- 1967 - 11 May: Sulaymaniyah Chamber of Commerce and industry founded.
- 1968 - University of Sulaymaniyah established .
- 1970 - Union of Kurdish Writers established.
- 1982 - 23 April: Demonstration against Iraqi Regime.
- 1991 - 7 March: Uprising against Saddam Hussein.
- 1995 - Amna Suraka Museum opens.
- 1996
  - Hosseiniyeh Al-Hakim built.
  - Sulaimani Polytechnic University established.

== 21st century ==
- 2006 - The American University of Iraq established.
- 2011 - 17 February: Demonstration against Domestic government and a small group of protesters tried to storm the headquarters of the Kurdistan Democratic Party and threw rocks at the building .
- 2020
  - 2 December: A many teachers and employees got out in the street against didn't get salary from a few months from Kurdistan Regional Government
  - 7 December: The Kurdish security forces raided NRT’s headquarters channel and closed it.
