= Imam Mosa Al Kadhim Grand Mosque =

Mosque in Basra, Iraq

- Location of the mosque in Iraq

Religion
- Affiliation: Shia (Twelver)
- Ecclesiastical or organizational status: Congregational mosque
- Status: Active

Location
- Location: Basra, Basra Governorate
- Country: Iraq
- Interactive map of Imam Mosa Al Kadhim Grand Mosque
- Coordinates: 30°30′04″N 47°46′56″E

Specifications
- Dome: Two (maybe more)
- Minaret: Four

The Imam Mosa Al Kadhim Grand Mosque is a Twelver Shi'ite congregational mosque located in the city of Basra, in the Basra Governorate of Iraq. The mosque is located near the city of Mishraq and near Hayaniya. The mosque is named in honor of the Seventh Twelver Imam, Mūsā al-Kādhim, who was also known as Abu 'I-Hassan and al-Kazim.

Following its partial destruction, reconstruction of the mosque commenced in 2012.

== See also ==
- Shia Islam in Iraq
- List of mosques in Iraq
