= Sheikh Jawad Al-Sadiq Mosque =

Former Twelver mosque in Iraq, destroyed by ISIL in 2014

- مسجد الشيخ جواد الصادق
- The mosque, prior to its 2014 destruction

Religion
- Affiliation: Shia (Twelver) (former)
- Ecclesiastical or organizational status: Husayniyya and mosque ( –2014)
- Status: Destroyed

Location
- Location: Tal Afar, Nineveh Governorate
- Country: Iraq

Architecture
- Type: Mosque architecture
- Destroyed: 2014 (by ISIL)

Specifications
- Dome: One
- Minaret: One

The Sheikh Jawad Al-Sadiq Mosque, also known as the Husseiniyah Mullah Mahmoud, was a Twelver Shi'ite husseininya and mosque complex located in Tal Afar, in the Nineveh Governorate of Iraq. Prior to its 2014 destruction by the Islamic State of Iraq and the Levant, the mosque was located adjacent to the Saad Ibn Aqeel Shrine. The former mosque was named for the ninth Twelver Shi'a Imam, Muhammad al-Jawad and Sheikh Mahmoud al-Barzanji. There is a small cemetery behind the former mosque.

== Incidents ==
On 15 February 2008, two suicide bombers attacked the mosque after the Friday prayers. 17 people were wounded from the attack.

In 2014, the mosque was demolished with explosives by ISIL as part of a plan to destroy Shi'a and Sufi sites in Nineveh governorate. Explosive devices were rigged to the minaret, destroying the mosque. ISIL claimed that these buildings were used to "worship" Husayn.

== See also ==
- Destruction of cultural heritage by the Islamic State
- List of mosques in Iraq
- Shia Islam in Iraq
