= Al-Arba'een Mosque =

Mosque in Tikrit, Iraq

- جامع الأربعين شهيداً
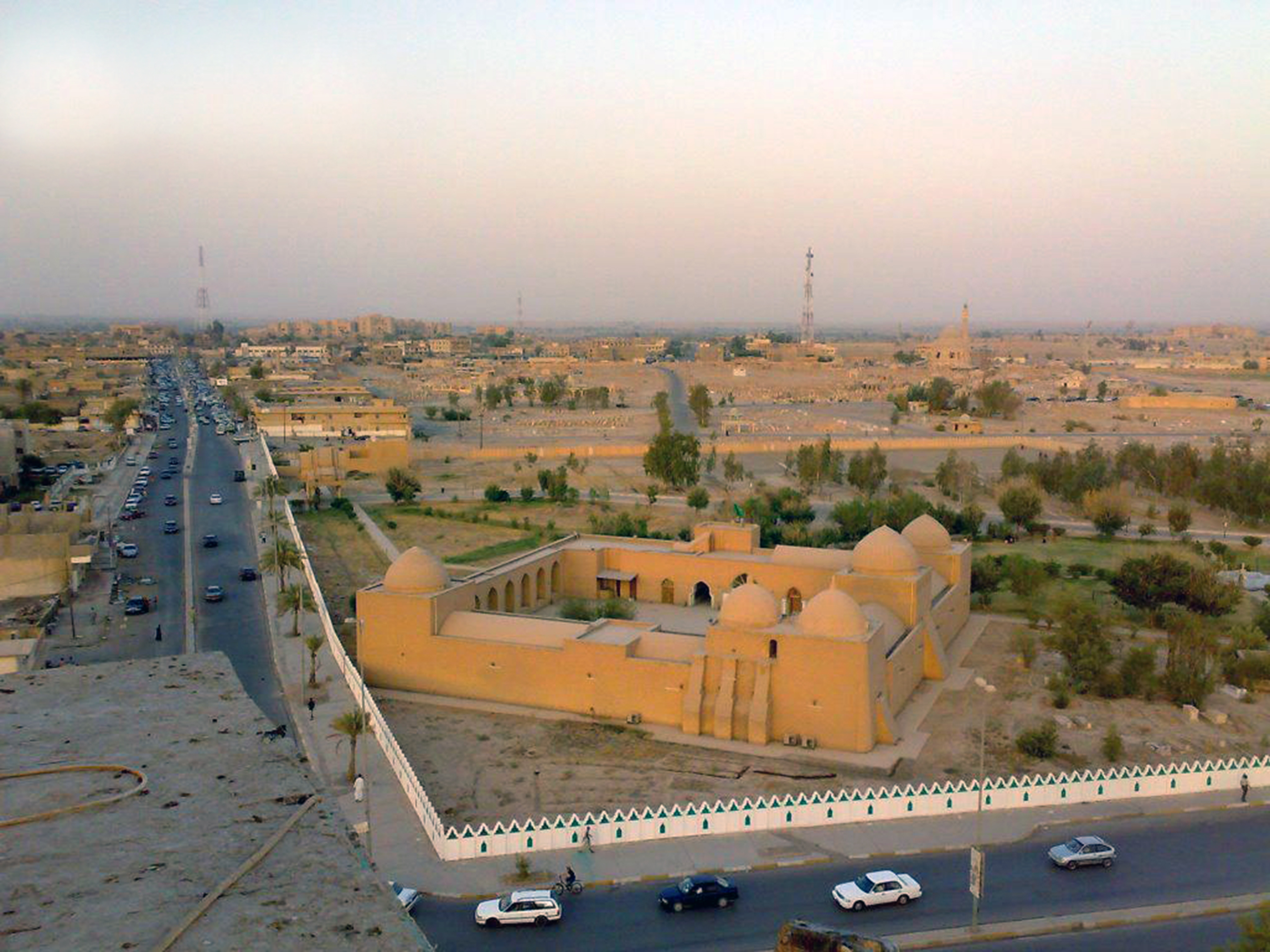
- The mosque before its 2014 destruction

- Location of the mosque in Iraq

Religion
- Affiliation: Sunni Islam (former)
- Ecclesiastical or organizational status: Mosque (11th century–2014)
- Status: Destroyed (under reconstruction)

Location
- Location: Tikrit, Saladin Governorate
- Country: Iraq
- Interactive map of Al-Arba'een Mosque
- Coordinates: 34°35′56″N 43°40′34″E

Architecture
- Type: Mosque architecture
- Founder: Amr ibn Jundab Al-Ghafari
- Completed: 5th century AH (11th century CE)
- Destroyed: 24 September 2014

Specifications
- Length: 47 m (154 ft)
- Width: 47 m (154 ft)
- Dome: Five (since destroyed)
- Minaret: One (since destroyed)
- Shrines: Two: Amr ibn Jundab Al-Ghafari; Sitt Nafisa
- Materials: Gravel; plaster

The Al-Arba'een Mosque (Arabic: جامع الأربعين شهيداً) is a former Sunni mosque, that was located in the city of Tikrit, in the Saladin Governorate of Iraq. It contained a shrine for Amr ibn Jundab Al-Ghafari, and another shrine for Sitt Nafisa. The mosque was destroyed by ISIL on 24 September 2014.

== History ==
The building dates from the 5th century AH (11th century CE). The name of the mosque, "Al-Arba'een" (The Forty), is derived from a belief that forty martyrs killed during an Islamic conquest of Tikrit and were buried under the mosque, although this claim is contested as reports of the forty graves are weak.

The building was used as an Islamic university in 1262 CE.

== Architecture ==
The mosque building was a square shape, with five domes. Each side was approximately 47 metres (154 ft) long. Its dimensions are 36.5 by 35.5 metres (120 by 116 ft). Gravel and plaster were mostly used to construct the building and the two venerated rooms are 10 metres (33 ft) tall.

One of these venerated rooms was a shrine that contained a tomb of Amr ibn Jundab Al-Ghafari, a companion of the Rashidun caliph Umar ibn Al-Khattab. There was also a cellar in the building which is believed by locals to house the resting place of a female saint, Sitt Nafisa.

The mosque was destroyed by the Islamic State of Iraq and the Levant in 2014 by explosives. The explosion completely destroyed the shrines but did not damage the rest of the mosque. The surrounding cemetery was damaged.

== See also ==
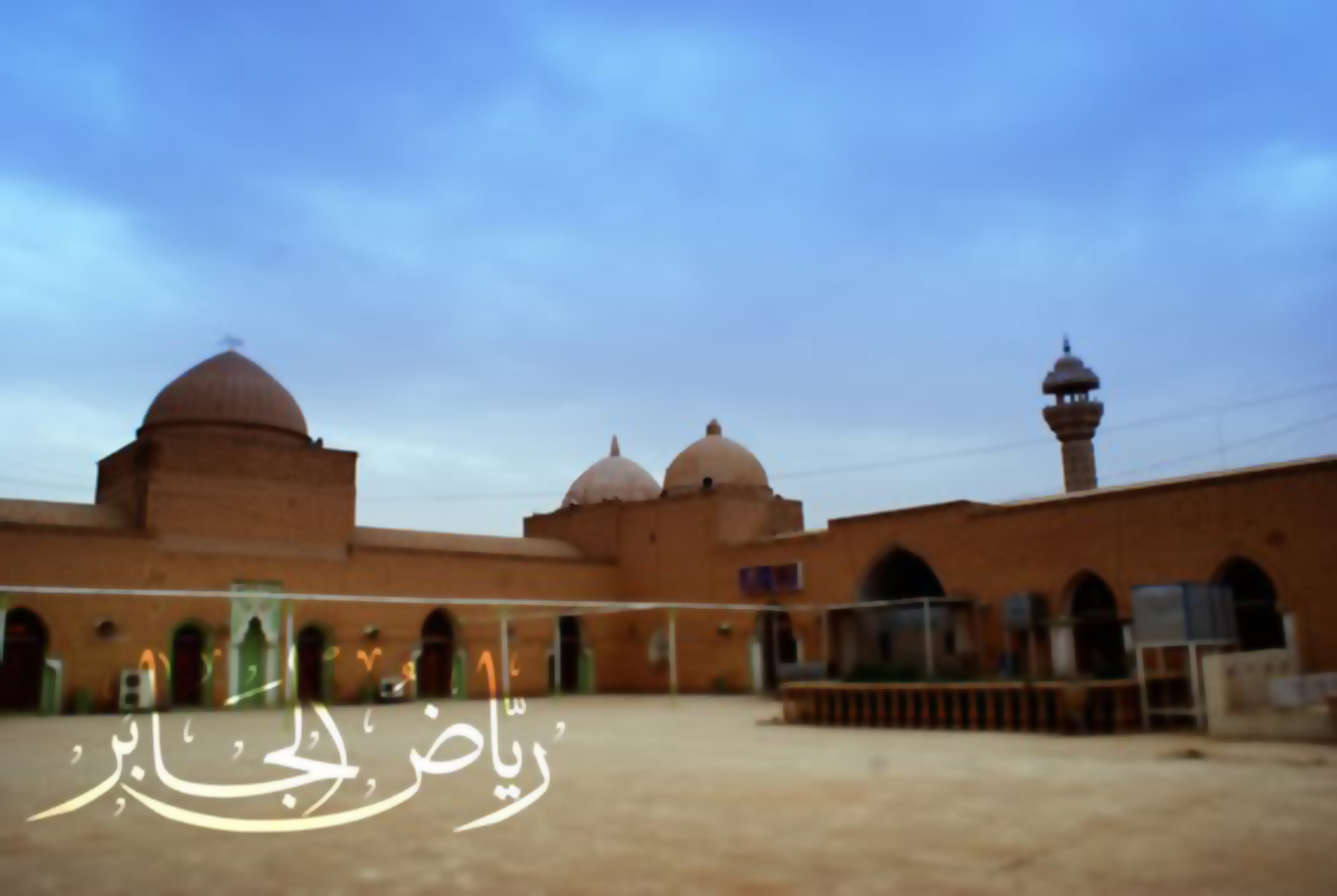
The mosque before its destruction in 2014.

- Destruction of cultural heritage by the Islamic State
- Islam in Iraq
- List of mosques in Iraq
