= Imam Sultan Saqi Shrine =

Twelver Shi'ite shrine and cemetery in Kirkuk, Iraq

- مرقد الامام سلطان ساقي
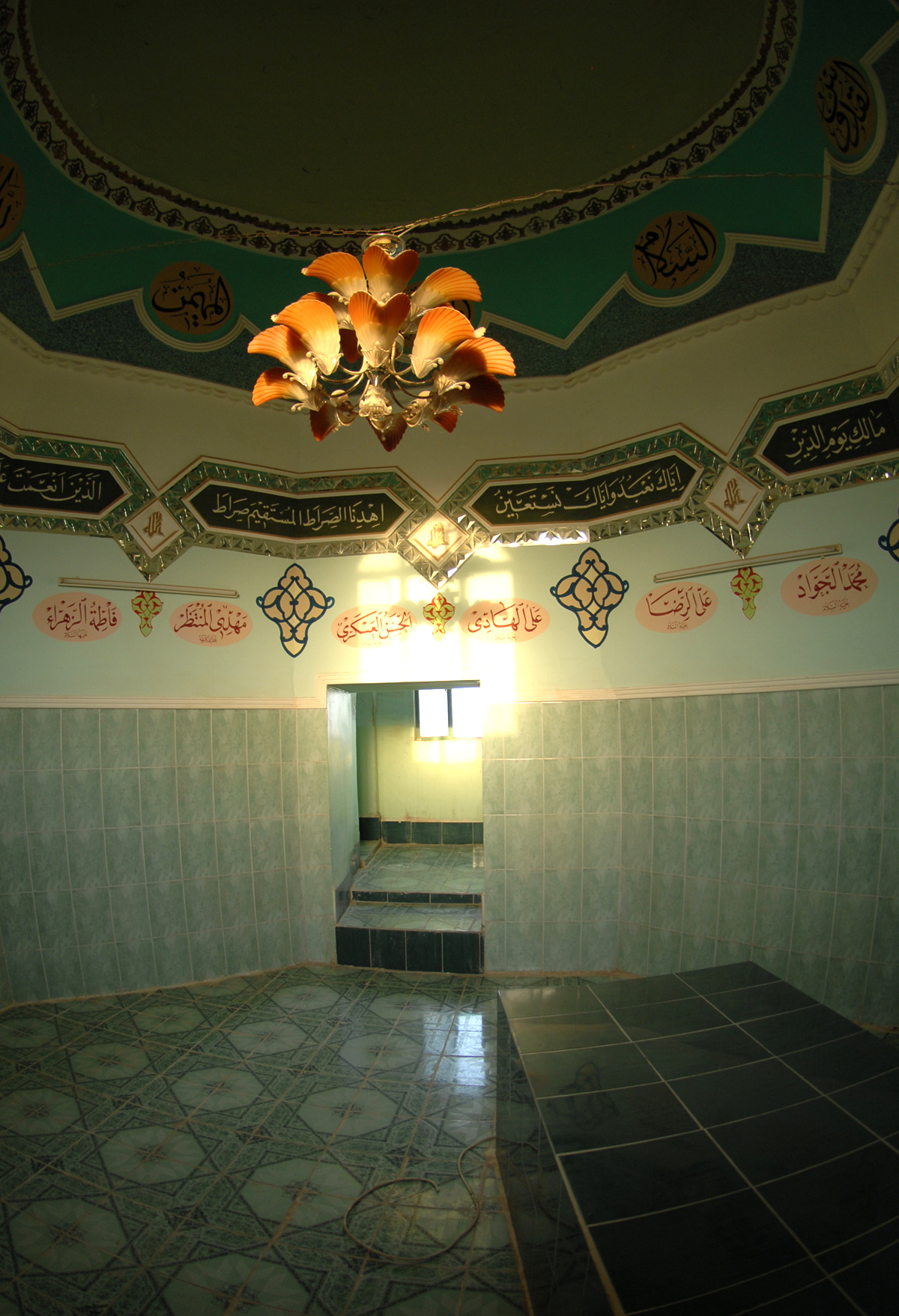
- Interior of the shrine's central chamber

- Location of the shrine in Iraq

Religion
- Affiliation: Shia (Twelver)
- Ecclesiastical or organisational status: Shrine
- Status: Active (limited public access)

Location
- Location: Tisin, Kirkuk, Kirkuk Governorate
- Country: Iraq
- Coordinates: 35°27′06″N 44°21′02″E

Architecture
- Type: Islamic architecture
- Completed: 1960s

Specifications
- Dome: Three
- Shrines: Two: Imam Sultan Saqi; Sultana, his sister

The Imam Sultan Saqi Shrine (Arabic: مرقد الامام سلطان ساقي) is a Twelver Shi'ite shrine for the community of Turkmen, located in the Tisin neighbourhood of the city of Kirkuk, in the Kirkuk Governorate, Iraq. The shrine contains a tomb dedicated to Imam Sultan Saqi, a descendant of Ja'far ibn Abi Talib, whose grave dates from 600 CE. The mausoleum was completed in the 1960s, is located within a local cemetery, that was part of the former Kirkuk Regional Air Base.

On 27 May 2009, the shrine was restored in a combined effort by both Iraqi and American soldiers. As of April 2024, public access to the shrine was limited.

== Gallery ==
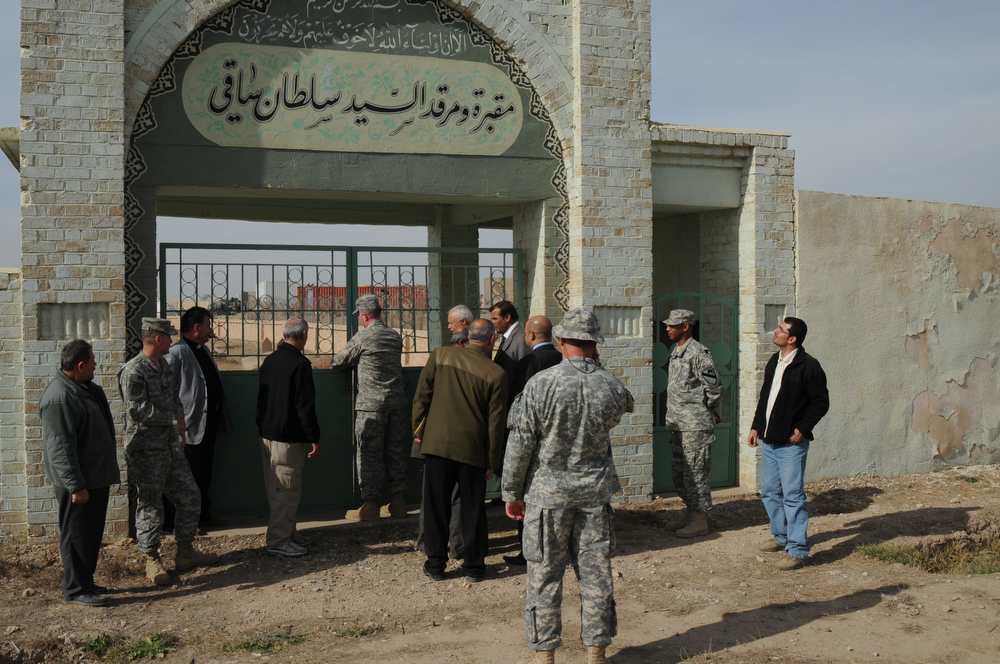
The restoration team gathers near the shrine

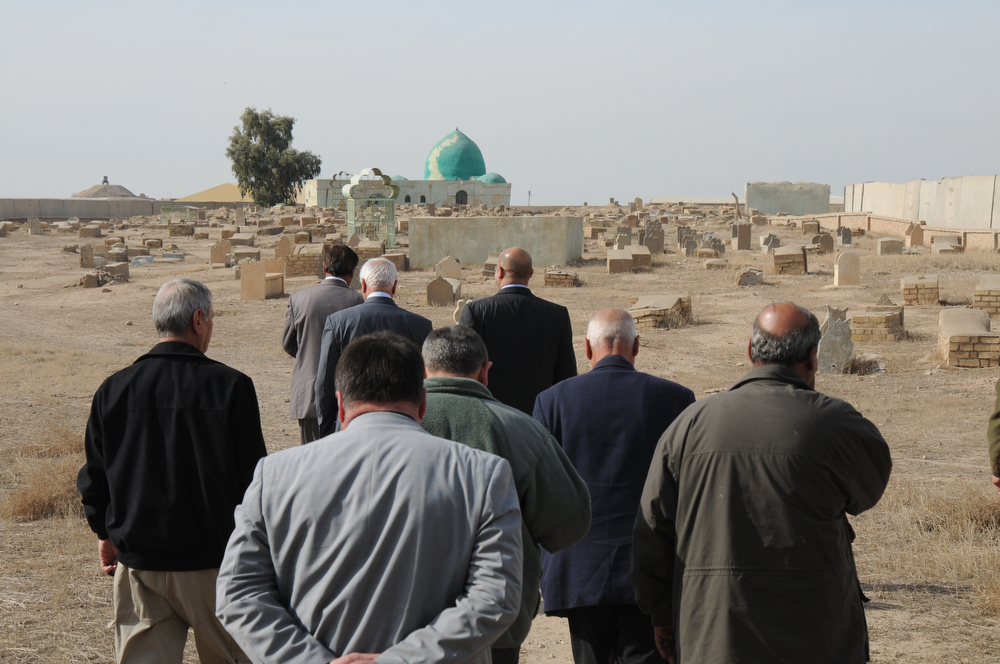
An exterior shot featuring the shrine

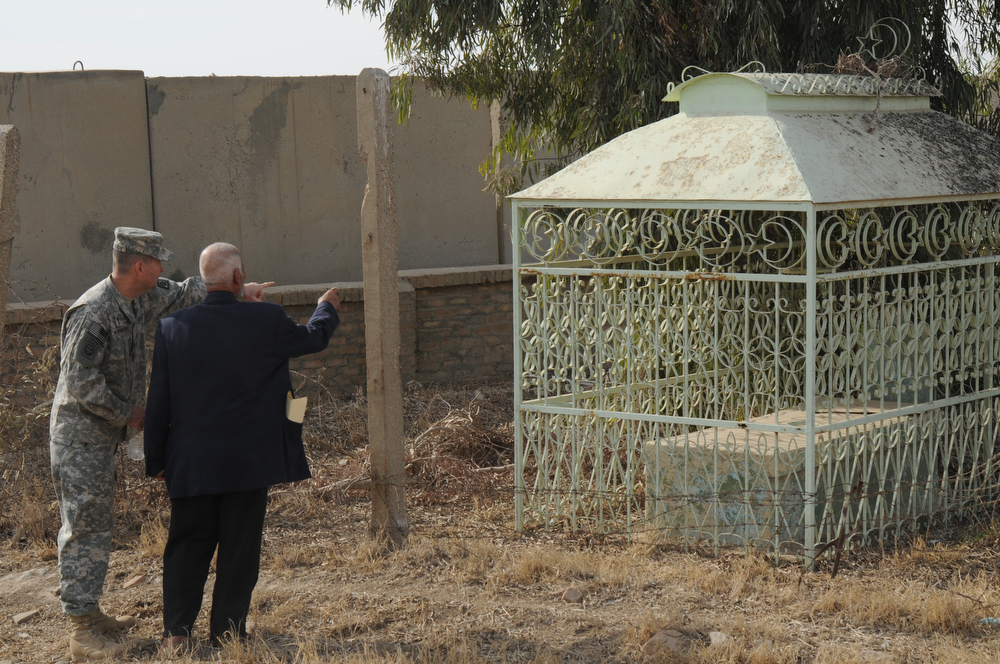
A U.S. soldier and the shrine's caretaker

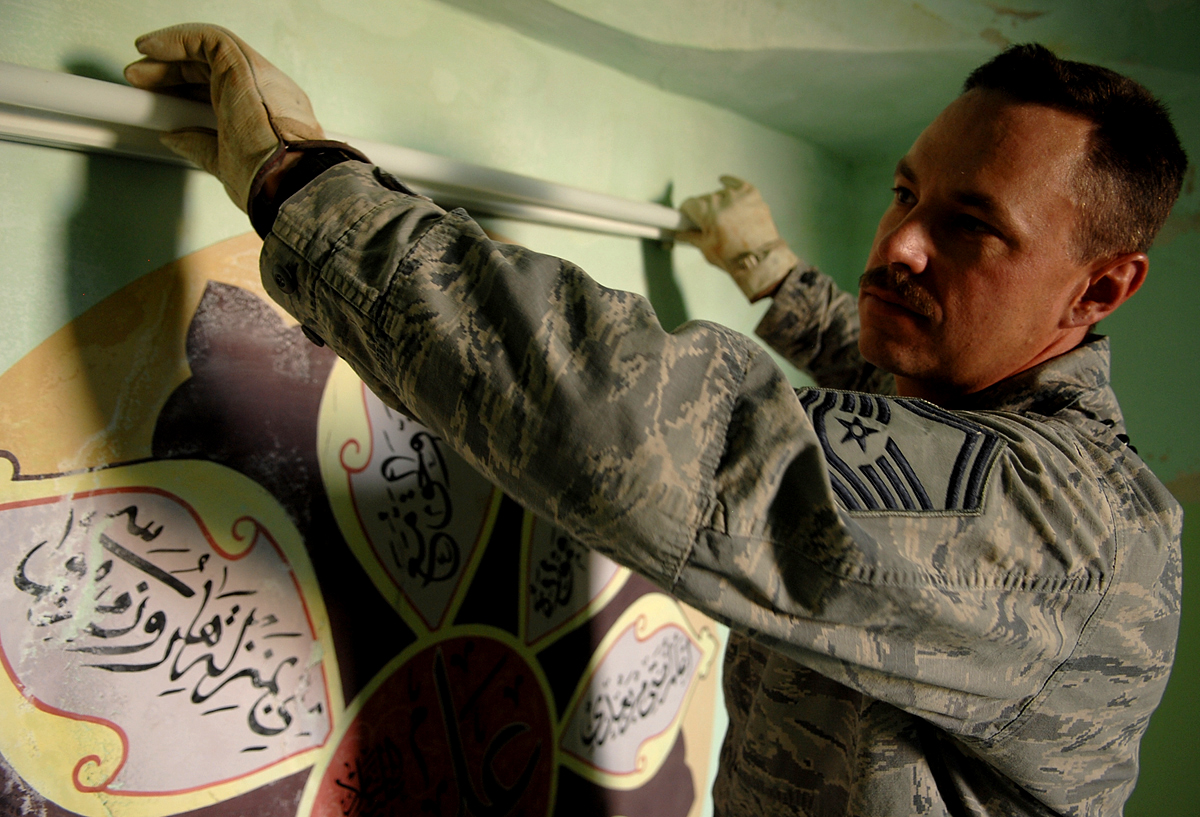
An Iraqi soldier installs a new lighting system in the shrine

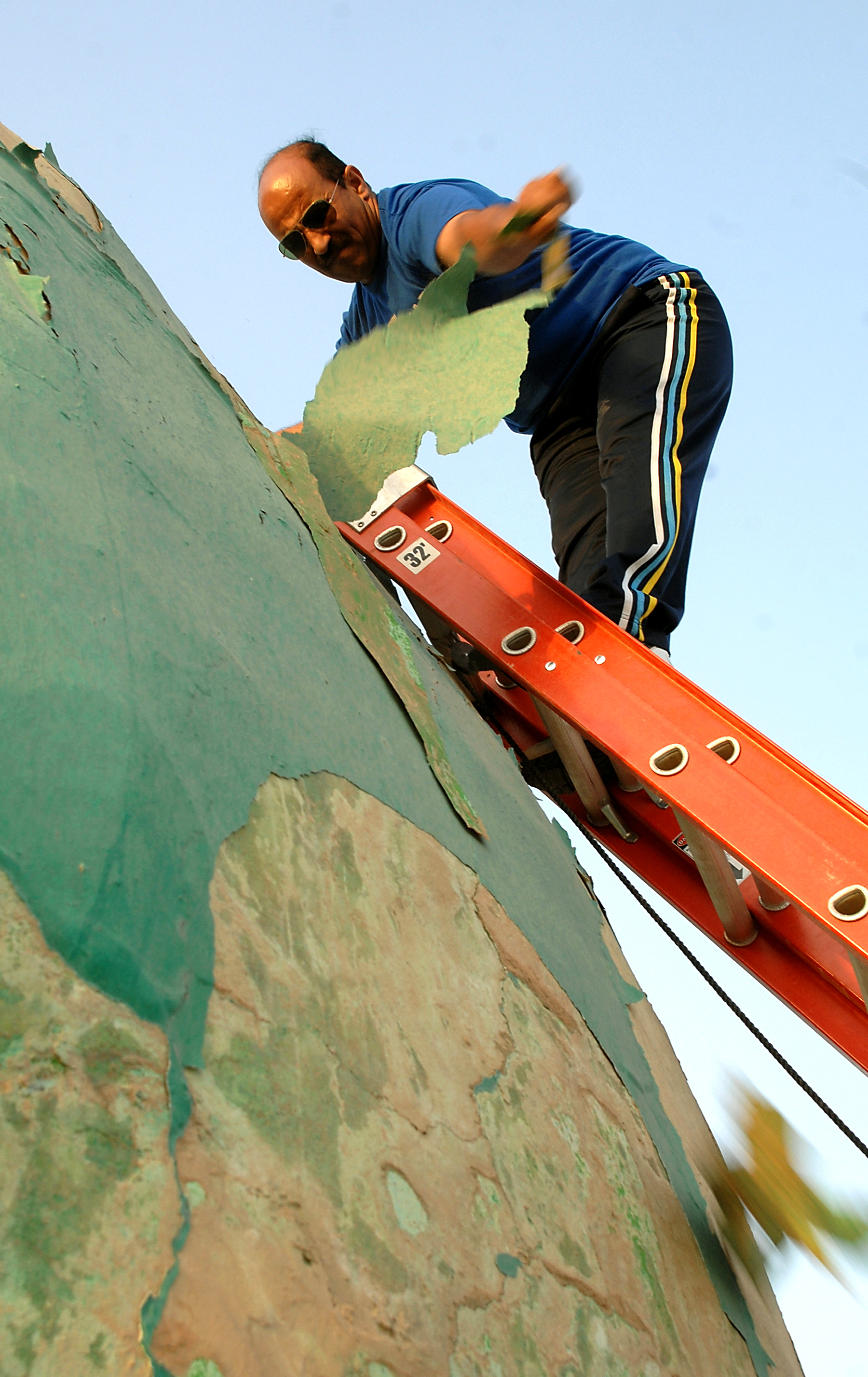
One of the domes of the shrine being stripped

== See also ==
- Shia Islam in Iraq
- List of mosques in Iraq
