= List of mosques in Iraq =

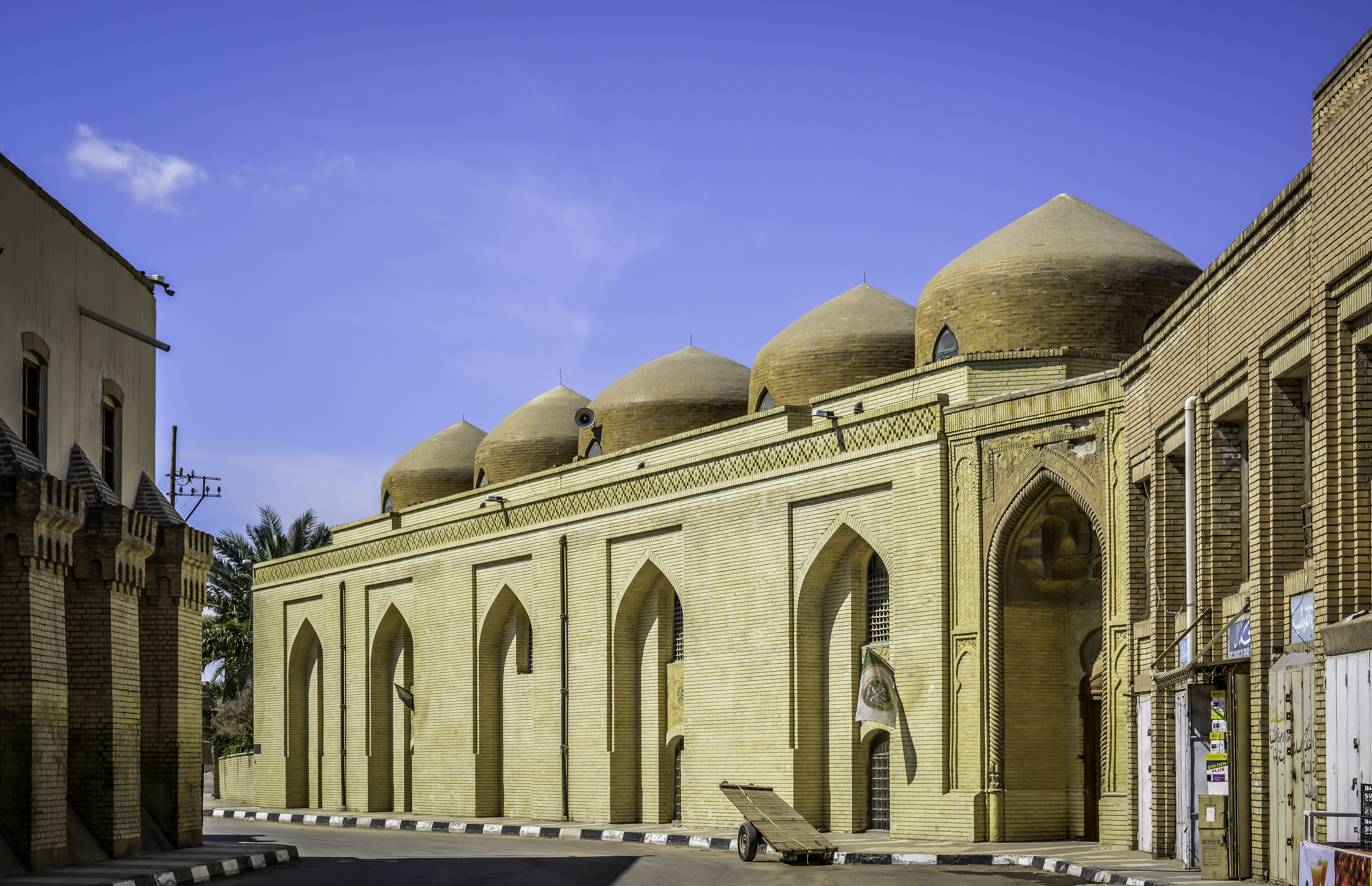
Al-Sarai Mosque, Baghdad

This is a list of mosques in Iraq. There are 7,000 Sunni mosques and 3,500 Shia mosques in Iraq as a whole. According to the Office of Waqf and Sunnah in Iraq, in the capital city of Baghdad, there are 912 congregational mosques that conduct Friday Prayer and 149 smaller mosques which only hold regular daily prayers. In Fallujah, there are 970 mosques according to the 2009 data.

== List ==
Name	Images	Location	Year	Branch	Remarks
Imam Ali Mosque (Basra)		Basra	635	Sh	
Umayyad Mosque of Mosul (Al-Musaffi Mosque)		Mosul	637	Su	Demolished and rebuilt
Great Mosque of Kufa		Kūfa	639	Sh	The mosque entombs the remains of Muslim ibn ‘Aqīl, Hānī ibn ‘Urwa, and Mukhtār al-Thaqafī, along with having many sites of historical relevance within the mosque.
Al-Sahlah Mosque		Kūfa	656–660	Sh	Believed to be the future home of Muhammad al-Mahdi.
Imām Husayn Mosque		Karbalā	680	Sh	Entombs the remains of Shī‘ah Imām Husayn ibn ‘Alī, his sons ‘Alī al-Akbar and ‘Alī al-Asghar, those who fell at Karbalā, Habīb ibn Madhāhir al-Asadī, and Ibrāhīm al-Mujāb (son of Mūsā al-Kādhim)
Great Mosque (Aqrah)		Aqrah	7th century	Su	
Al Abbas Mosque		Karbalā	7th century	Sh	Entombs the remains of ‘Abbās ibn ‘Alī, brother of Shī‘ah Imām Husayn ibn ‘Alī.
Mausoleum of Yahya Abu al-Qasim		Mosul	799	Sh	Entombs the remains of Abu'l Qasim Yahya ibn al-Hasan. Destroyed by the Islamic State of Iraq and Levant in 2014.
Great Mosque of Samarra		Sāmarrā'	851	Su	
Abu Dulaf Mosque		Sāmarrā'	859	Su	
Al-Khulafa Mosque		Baghdād	902–908	Su	Oldest existing mosque in Baghdad, although renovated for numerous times. The minaret dates back to the Abbasid era.
Al-Kadhimiya Mosque		Baghdād	915	Sh	Entombs the remains of two Twelver Shī‘ah Imāms: Mūsā al-Kādhim and Muhammad al-Taqī.
Al-'Askari Mosque		Sāmarrā'	944	Sh	Entombs the remains of Twelver Shī'ah Imāms, 'Alī an-Naqī and his son Hasan al-'Askarī, as well as Narjis Khātūn and Hakimah Khātūn.
Imam Ali Shrine		Najaf	977	Sh	Entombs the remains of the first Shī'ah Imām, Alī ibn Abī Tālib.
Minaret of Anah		Anah	996–1096	Su	Destroyed by the Islamic State of Iraq and Levant in 2016.
Al-Hannanah Mosque		Kūfa-Najaf metropolis	997–1041	Sh	Believed to be keeping the head of Husayn ibn Ali
Abu Hanifa Mosque		Baghdād	10th century	Su	Entombs the remains of Abū Ḥanīfah an-Nuʿmān.
Shrine of the Forty		Tikrit	11th century	Su	Entombs the remains of Amr ibn Junayda Al-Ghafari. Demolished in 2014 and undergoing restoration.
Al-Mujahidi Mosque		Mosul	1133	Su	Destroyed by the Islamic State of Iraq and Levant in 2014–2015.
Great Mosque of Amadiya		Amadiya	1177	Su	
Mausoleum of Imam al-Hasan of Basra		Basra	1185	Su	Entombs the remains of Hasan of Basra
Imam Saad bin Aqil' Shrine		Tal Afar	1142	Sh	Entombs the remains of a governor of the Upper Mesopotamia.
Great Mosque of al-Nuri		Mosul	1172–1173	Su	The minaret and mosque was destroyed in 2017 during the Battle of Mosul; reconstructed and reopened in 2024.
Mashhad Radd al-Shams		Hillah	1190	Sh	Formerly a Babylonian temple, now a shrine believed to be the spot where the event of Radd al-Shams occurred.
Al-Sarai Mosque (King Ghazi Mosque)		Baghdād	1193	Su	
Haydar-Khana Mosque		Baghdād	12th century	Su	Established in the 12th century and rebuilt in 1819
Mausoleum of Abdul-Qadir Gilani		Baghdād	12th century	Su	Originally built as mausoleum. Preserves the tomb of Abdul Qadir Gilan, the founder of Qadiriyya Sufi order
Mausoleum of Umar Suhrawardi		Baghdād	12th century	Su	Originally built as mausoleum. Preserves the tomb of Shahab al-Din Abu Hafs Umar Suhrawardi, the founder of Suhrawardiyya Sufi order
Al-Imam Muhsin Mosque		Mosul	12th century	Su	Damaged by the Islamic State of Iraq and Levant in 2015.
Imam al-Baher Mosque		Mosul	12th–13th centuries	Su	Formerly a tomb for Imam Al-Baher which no longer exists after the reconstruction in 2022.
Zumurrud Khatun Mosque		Baghdād	1202	Su	Originally built as mausoleum. The minaret is considered the oldest surviving in Baghdad.
Mudhafaria Minaret		Erbil	1232	Su	
Sayyidah Zaynab Mosque		Sinjar	1239	Sh	Contains a shrine dedicated to a daughter of Ali ibn Husayn Zayn al-Abidin.
Qamariya Mosque		Baghdad	1242		
Mausoleum of Ahmad al-Rifa'i		Al-Rifa'i District	before 1325	Su	Entombs the remains of Ahmad al-Rifa'i, the founder of the Rifa'i tariqah.
Murjan Mosque		Baghdād	1356	Su	
Al-Nukhailah Mosque		Al Kifl	1309	Sh	Contains Dhu'l Kifl Shrine, which houses the tomb of the prophet Ezekiel.
Al-Nabi Yunus Mosque		Mosul	1365	Su	Destroyed by the Islamic State of Iraq and Levant in 2014.
17th of Ramadan Mosque		Baghdad	20th century	Sh	Went by many names throughout its history.
Al-Ahmadiya Mosque		Baghdād	1796	Su	
Al-Adliya Mosque		Baghdad	1749	Su	Built by Adila Khatun
Al-Asifyah Mosque		Baghdād	1608	Su	
Ezra's Tomb		Maysan Governorate	1768	Sh	
Ibn Bunnieh Mosque		Baghdād	1973	Sh	
Al-Khilani Mosque		Baghdād	before 1726	Sh	Originally built as mausoleum. Preserves the tomb of Abu Jafar Muhammad ibn Uthman, the second of The Four Deputies in Twelver Shia Islam
Jalil Khayat Mosque		Erbil	1997	Su	
Mausoleum of Kumayl ibn Ziyad		Najaf	1950	Sh	
Sheikh Jawad Al-Sadiq Mosque		Tal Afar	N/A	Sh	It was destroyed in 2014 by ISIL.
Al-Maqam Mosque		Basra	1754	Sh	
Mausoleum of Maytham al-Tammar		Kūfa	before 20th-century; 2011 reconstruction	Sh	
Mosul Grand Mosque		Mosul	U/C	Su	When completed, will be the largest mosque in Mosul.
Mosque of the Prophet Daniel		Kirkuk	15th century	Sh	Located inside the Kirkuk Citadel. Contains the tombs of Daniel, Hananiah, Mishael and Azariah. Mishael's tomb is currently no longer present in the structure.
Mosque of the Prophet Seth		Mosul	1791	Su	Destroyed by the Islamic State of Iraq and Levant in 2014.
Al-Rahman mosque		Baghdād	U/C	Sh	uncompleted, construction halted
Mosque of Salman al-Farsi		Salman Pak	1950	Sh	Formerly a Sunni mosque, transferred to the Shi'ite management in the 21st century. Built around the purported mausoleum of Salman al-Farsi in 1950.
Mausoleum of Sayyid Ali al-Zaki		Al-Kahla District	2017	Sh	Contains the tomb of Sayyid Ali al-Zaki, a 10th-century Muslim scholar.
Great Mosque of Sulaymaniyah		Sulaymaniyah	1784	Su	First mosque in Sulaymaniyah. Entombs the remains of local cleric Haji Kaka Ahmad and his grandson Mahmud Barzanji. It contains a cafeteria where meals for the needy are served.
Said Sultan Ali Mosque		Baghdād	1590	Su	
Shaykh Rajab Mosque		Rawa	1625	Su	
Imam Sultan Saqi Shrine		Kirkuk	7th century; 1960s reconstruction	Sh	Historic site in Kirkuk which also includes a cemetery around it.
Umm al-Tabul Mosque		Baghdād	1968	Su	Built in commemoration of the officers participating in the 1959 Mosul uprising.
Umm al-Qura Mosque		Baghdād	2001	Su	
Al-Wazeer Mosque		Baghdād	1660	Su	
Al-Hamra Mosque		Kufa	7th century; 2018 reconstruction	Sh	One of the oldest mosques in Kufa, it includes a small shrine dedicated to biblical Jonah (Prophet Yunus).

Group
Su	Sunni
Sh	Shī‘ah
TS	Twelver Shī‘ah

== See also ==
- Islam in Iraq
- Lists of mosques
  - List of mosques in Baghdad
  - List of Islamic structures in Mosul
