= Al-Mujahidi Mosque =

Former mosque in Mosul, Iraq

- Arabic: جامع المجاهدي
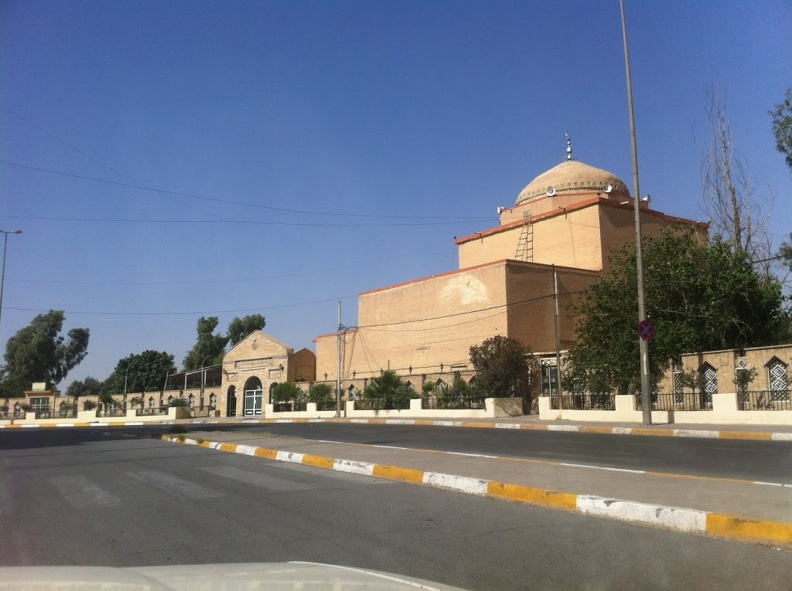
- The destroyed Al-Mujahidi Mosque in Mosul, pictured in 2017.

- Location in Iraq

Religion
- Affiliation: Islam
- Ecclesiastical or organizational status: Mosque
- Status: Partially Restored

Location
- Location: Mosul, Iraq
- Interactive map of Al-Mujahidi Mosque
- Coordinates: 36°20′41″N 43°8′11″E

Architecture
- Type: Islamic architecture
- Established: 1151 CE
- Destroyed: 2015

Al-Mujahidi Mosque (Arabic: جامع المجاهدي) is a historic mosque located in Mosul, Iraq. The mosque dates back to the 12th century and witnessed many renovations since then. The mosque was also known for having many names each based on its own story. It is located on the downtown of the city of Mosul at the Corniche Street, facing the riverbank of Tigris. The mosque was destroyed by the Islamic State of Iraq and Levant in 2015. As of 2024, it is in the process of being rebuilt.

== Etymology ==
The mosque was known as Al-Mujahidi Mosque (Arabic: جامع المجاهدي) until the 14th century in the honor of the ruler and the patron of the mosque Mujahid al-Din Qaimaz. The mosque was also known as Al-Rabad Mosque (Arabic: جامع الربض) which literally means the mosque of the outskirts. This was due to the mosque was fulfilled the need of the mosque for the people living in the outskirts of Mosul, with the Great Mosque of Al-Nuri and the Umayyad Mosque being overcrowded for congregational prayer. As such, the Al-Mujahidi was considered the third choice for the Friday Prayer as it was situated outside the Mosul wall.

== History ==
Foundation of the mosque dates back to 1151. The first Friday Prayer was held before the completion in 1154, as Mujahid completed the building of musholla (prayer room) first. When the mosque was completed, it was larger than it had been today. Mujahid took care of the mosque well with maintenance and providing decorations of Islamic calligraphy with a font which was unseen on the other mosques. The other decorations were done by plaster and some of the finest examples were decorations on top of the mihrab. The dome topping the musholla was colored in green-ish blue. The mosque was mentioned by the renowned historian Ali ibn al-Athir as a large and one of the most beautiful mosques. It was also visited by the renowned geographer Ibn Jubayr in 1184, who prayed there and praised the architectural accomplishment.

During the time of Tatar and Mongolian Invasion, the mosque was neglected and suffered the damage from decay. However, from 1718, the Ottoman wali Ali Pasha had begun refurbishing the mosque again. This condition was succeeded until the end of the 20th century by the ministry of endowment and religious affairs. In the 21st century, the mosque had begun suffering from the lack of proper maintenance, which was warned by the imam and preacher of the mosque Tariqi Hamdun. After the Iraq War, the mosque became active again for holding events such as the Quran Memorization Contest with the cooperation of Directory of Endowment and Sunna in Nineveh. However, it was destroyed by the Islamic State of Iraq and the Levant in 2014-2015 with explosives.

== See also ==
- Destruction of cultural heritage by the Islamic State
- Islam in Iraq
- List of Islamic structures in Mosul
- List of mosques in Iraq
