= Great Mosque, Aqrah =

Mosque in Aqrah, Duhok Governate, Iraq

Great Mosque of Aqrah
- الجامع الكبير (عقرة)
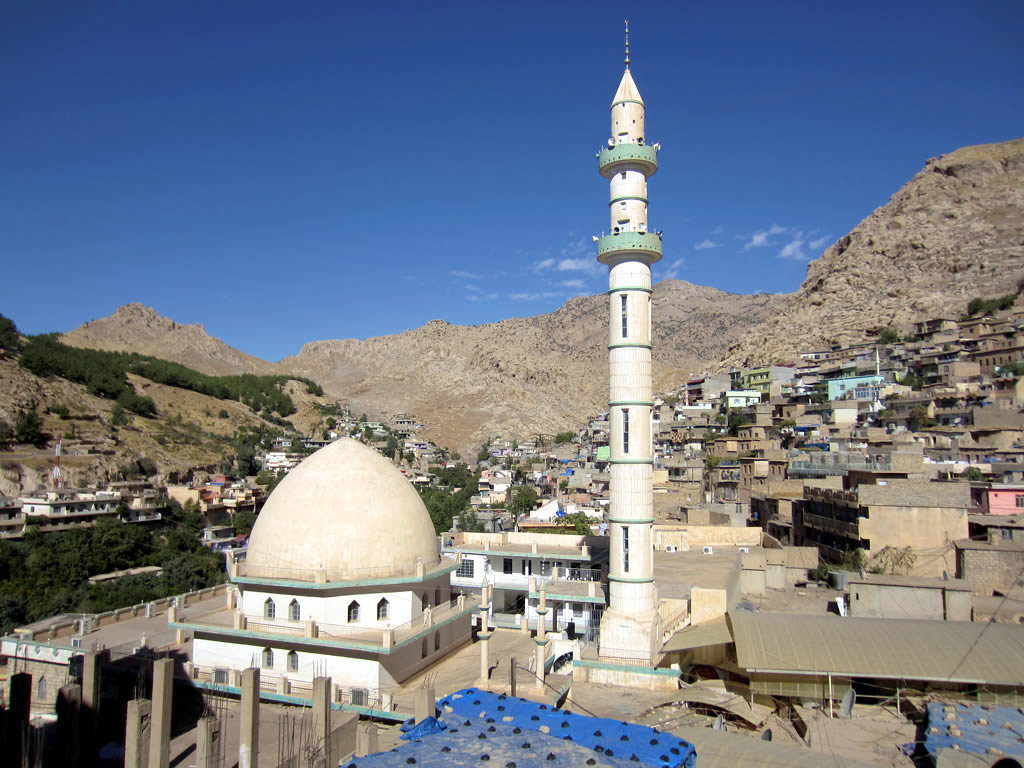
- The mosque in 2011

- Location of the mosque in Iraq

Religion
- Affiliation: Sunni Islam
- Ecclesiastical or organizational status: Mosque
- Status: Active

Location
- Location: Akrê, Duhok Governorate, Kurdistan Region
- Country: Iraq
- Interactive map of Great Mosque of Aqrah
- Coordinates: 36°45′32″N 43°53′36″E

Architecture
- Type: Mosque architecture
- Completed: 20 AH (640/641 CE)

Specifications
- Dome: One
- Minaret: One
- Minaret height: 65 m (213 ft)
- Site area: 3,000 m^{2} (32,000 sq ft)

The Great Mosque (Arabic: الجامع الكبير (عقرة)) is a Sunni mosque located in Akrê, in the Duhok Governorate, in the autonomous Kurdistan Region of Iraq. Completed in 20 AH (640/641 CE), it is one of the oldest and grandest mosques in Iraq.

== History ==
The mosque was founded in 20 AH (640/641 CE), after the spread of Islam in Iraqi Kurdistan, during the era of the second Caliph Umar.

Following several renovations and reconstructions, the mosque has an area of 3,000 square metres (32,000 sq ft). The latest renovation was in 1965, carried out by the Ministry of Endowment and Religious Affairs with the help of locals and ulamas.

Surrounding the mosque are several madrasas and religious institutions that offer diplomas. One of them is managed by Sayeed Munib Ahmad al-Imam, and the other is managed by Sheikh Abdullah Ahmad Muhammad. These religious institutions as well as the mosque are often visited places for religious leaders for its historical significance.

== See also ==
- Islam in Iraq
- List of mosques in Iraq
