= Shaykh Rajab Mosque =

Sufi mosque in Rawa, Iraq

- جامع الشيخ رجب
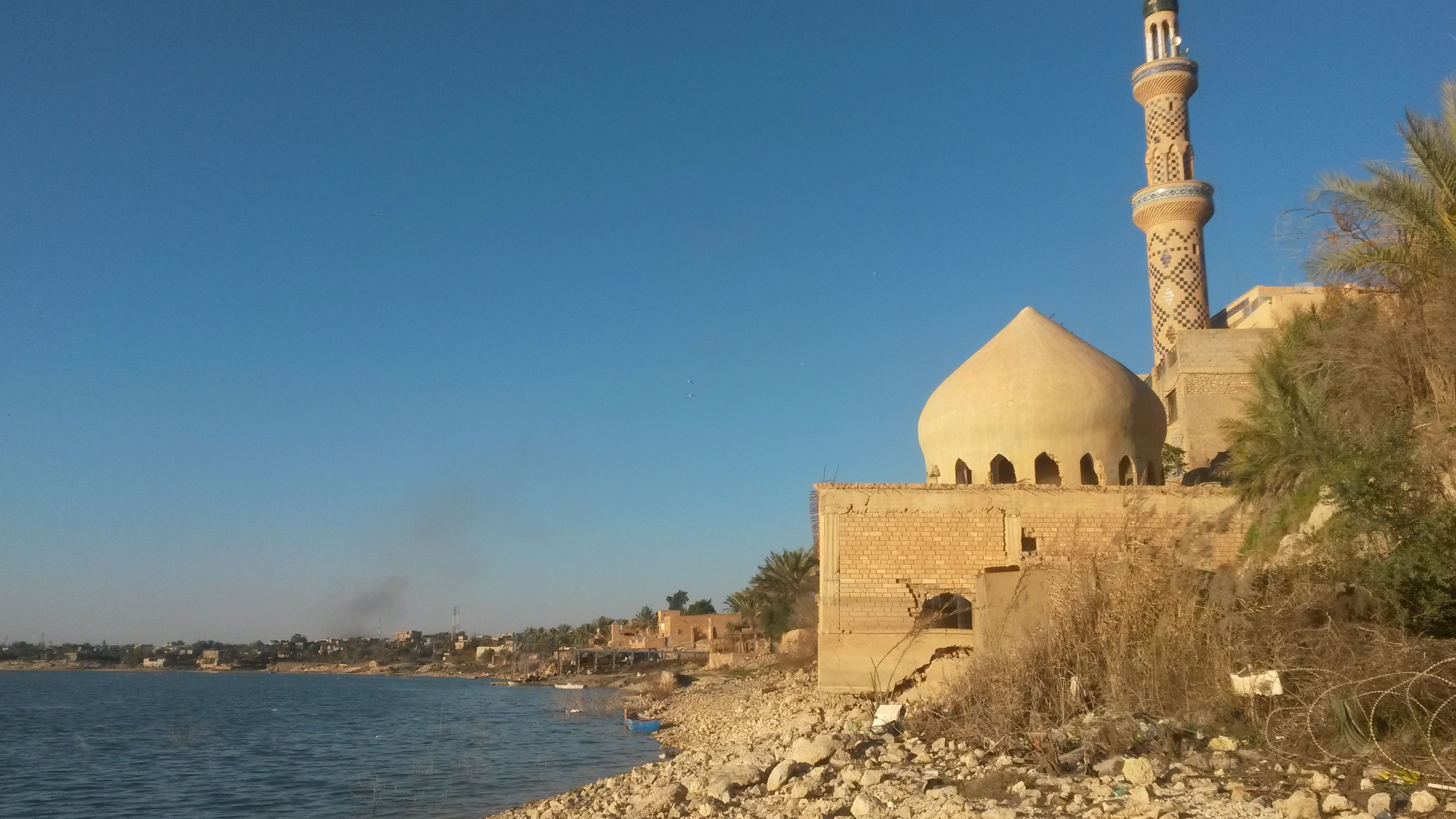
- The older section of the mosque, with the minaret and the back of the modern mosque visible, upper right

- Location of the mosque in Iraq

Religion
- Affiliation: Sunni Islam
- Sect: Sufi Rifa'i order

Location
- Location: Rawa, Al Anbar
- Country: Iraq
- Interactive map of Shaykh Rajab Mosque
- Coordinates: 34°28′03″N 41°54′54″E

Architecture
- Type: Mosque architecture
- Style: Modern Iraqi
- Completed: 1625 (Al-Barani Mosque); 1992 (Shaykh Rajab Mosque)

Specifications
- Capacity: 1,000 worshippers
- Dome: Two
- Minaret: One
- Minaret height: 30 m (98 ft)

The Shaykh Rajab Mosque (Arabic: جامع الشيخ رجب), formerly known as the Al-Barani Mosque, is a Sufi mosque located at Rawa, Iraq. It is named for Sayyid Rajab al-Rawi al-Rifa'i, a patron saint and follower of the Rifa'i order. The mosque is divided into two parts; the modern part is still used for prayer while the historic part dating to 1625 is flooded and hence is not used for prayer.

== History ==
The Al-Barani Mosque was constructed in 1625, next to the cemetery containing the (now-destroyed) mausoleum of Shaykh Rajab. In 1989, the town of Rawa was flooded, and along with much of the town, the mosque sank as well. With the architectural supervision of Raed Ali al-Rawi, a modern mosque structure known as the Shaykh Rajab Mosque was built on top of the sunken mosque in 1992, which is still in use to this day. The old mosque is still visible but it is not used.

== Gallery ==
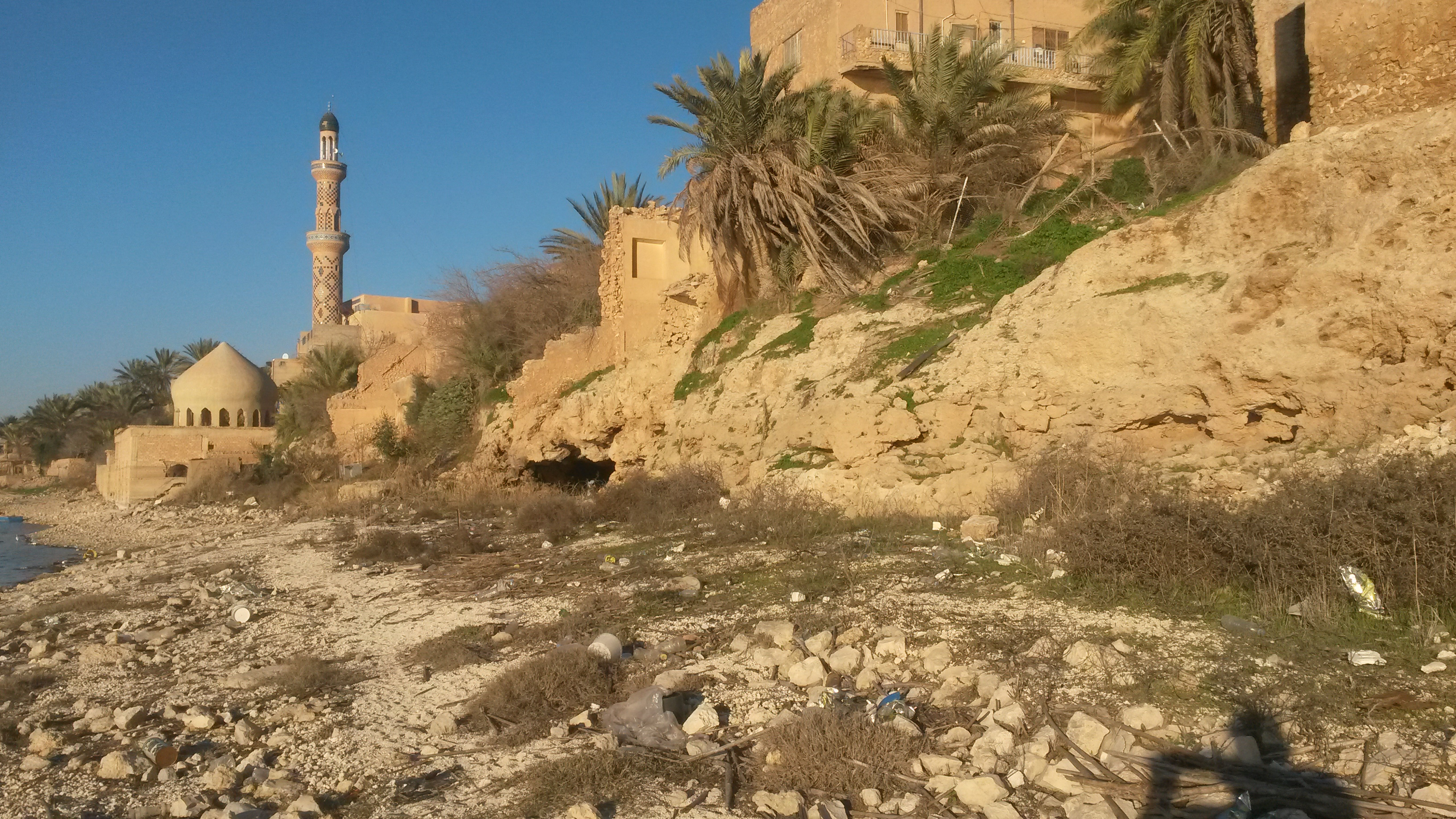
The resurfaced ruins of the town of Rawa with the mosque in the far left

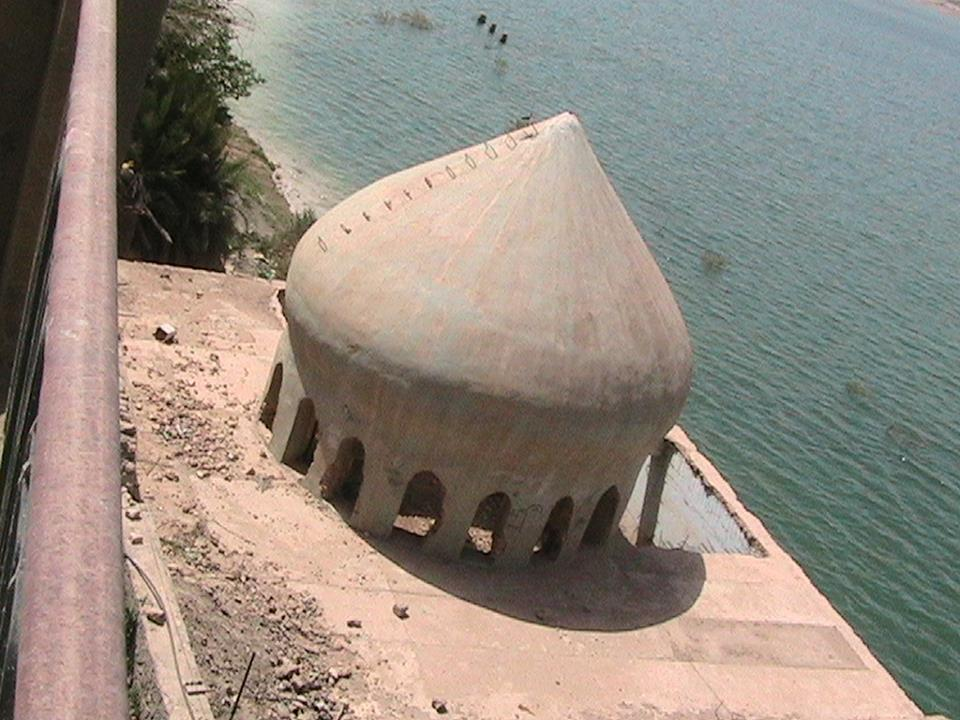
The dome of the old Al-Barani Mosque

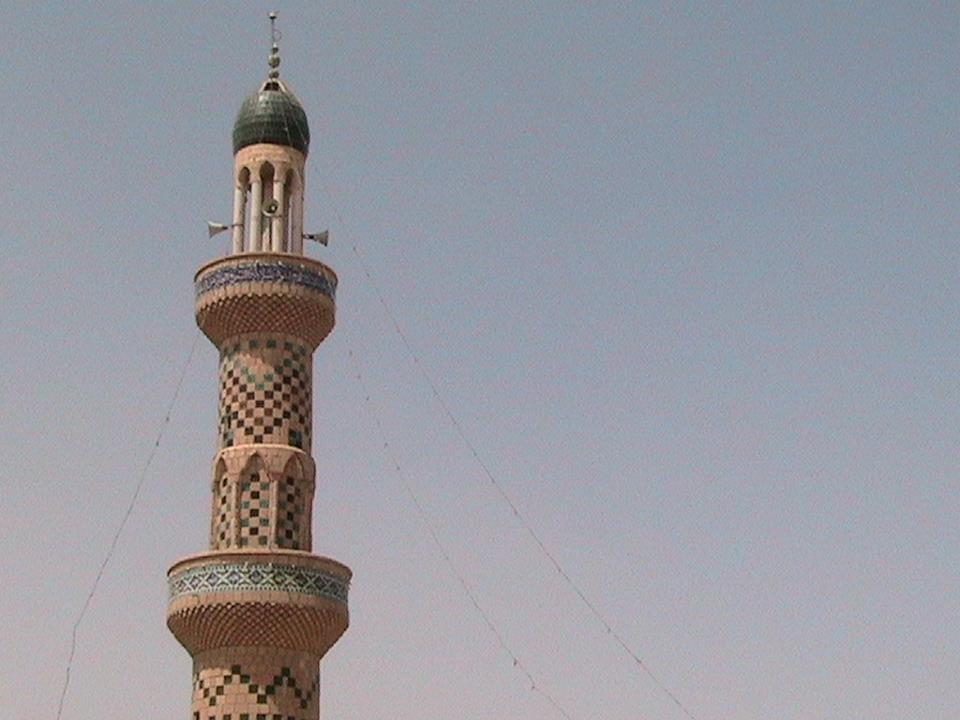
Closeup of the modern minaret

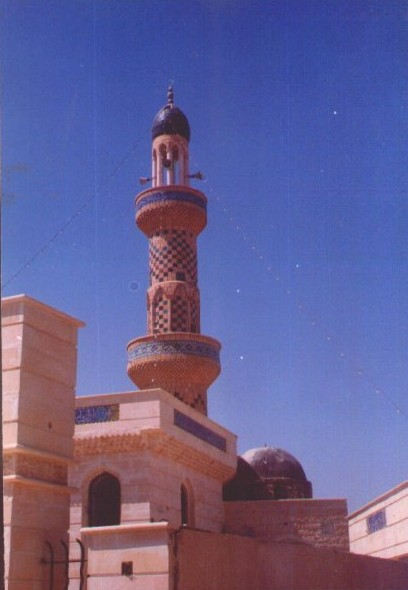
The modern mosque in the late 1990s

== See also ==
- List of mosques in Iraq
- Islam in Iraq
