= Al-Maqam Mosque =

Mosque in Basra, Iraq

- جامعة المقام
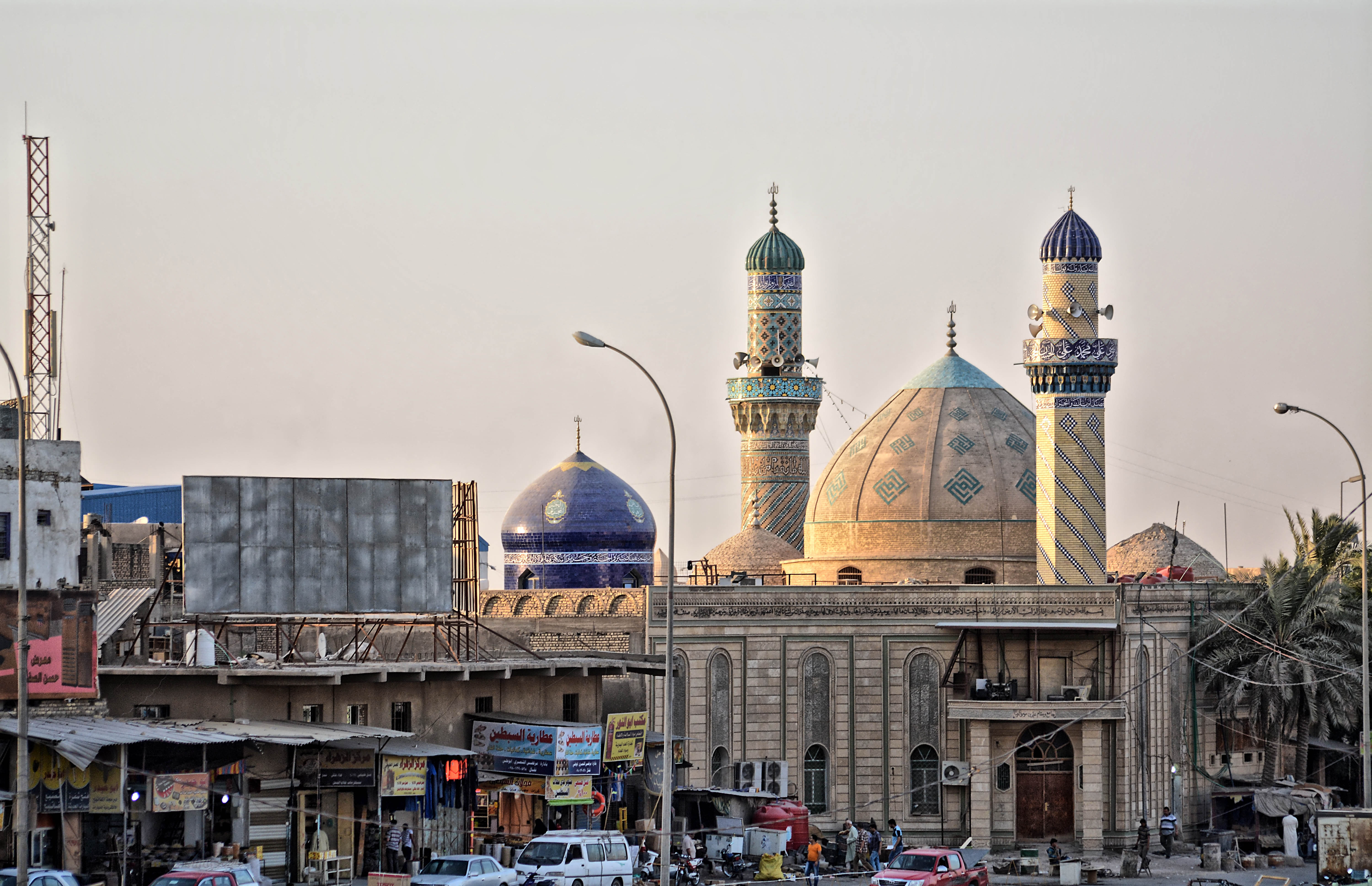
- The mosque in 2013

- Location of the mosque in Iraq

Religion
- Affiliation: Islam
- Ecclesiastical or organizational status: Mosque and shrine
- Status: Active

Location
- Location: Basra, Basra Governorate
- Country: Iraq
- Interactive map of Al-Maqam Mosque
- Coordinates: 30°31′18″N 47°50′14″E

Architecture
- Type: Islamic architecture
- Style: Ottoman
- Creator: Ottomans
- Completed: 1754 CE (mosque)

Specifications
- Capacity: 500 worshipers
- Interior area: 600 m^{2} (6,500 sq ft)
- Dome: Three
- Minaret: Two
- Minaret height: 25 m (82 ft)

The Al-Maqam Mosque (Arabic: جامعة المقام) is a historic mosque and shrine, located in the Al-'Ashara region, in the city of Basra, in the Basra Governorate of Iraq.

== Description ==
The word in Arabic: مقام, lit. 'Maqam' means "shrine", and it is believed that the site was originally a shrine, but the views are divided on who was commemorated. According to Muhammad Sadiq al-Hakim, the shrine dated from 772 CE, and it was established by the descendant of Islamic prophet Muhammad and the eighth Shia imam Ali al-Ridha when he visited Basra from Medina.

The construction of the mosque dates from 1754 CE by the Ottomans. It was among the largest mosques during the time, covering 600 square metres (6,500 sq ft) and the haram having capacity of 500 worshipers. The building is made of brick and constructed in the older Islamic architectural style. One of the domes is painted in blue, and the verses from the Dhikir al-Hakim inscribed on it. The minaret height reaches 25 metres (82 ft). The mosque was renovated in 1922 by the Ministry of Awqaf, during which the inner wall was fixed and the outer wall was added on the outside of the courtyard. Subsequently, the mosque has been directly connected to the Shatt al-Arab. There are two libraries adjacent to the mosque, one on the first floor which stores Quran and books for dawah, and another on the second floor which was newly founded and named as the Library of Imam Ali bin Musa al-Ridha.

== See also ==
- Islam in Iraq
- List of mosques in Iraq
