= Al-Hamra Mosque (Kufa) =

Mosque in Kufa, Iraq

- مسجد الحمراء
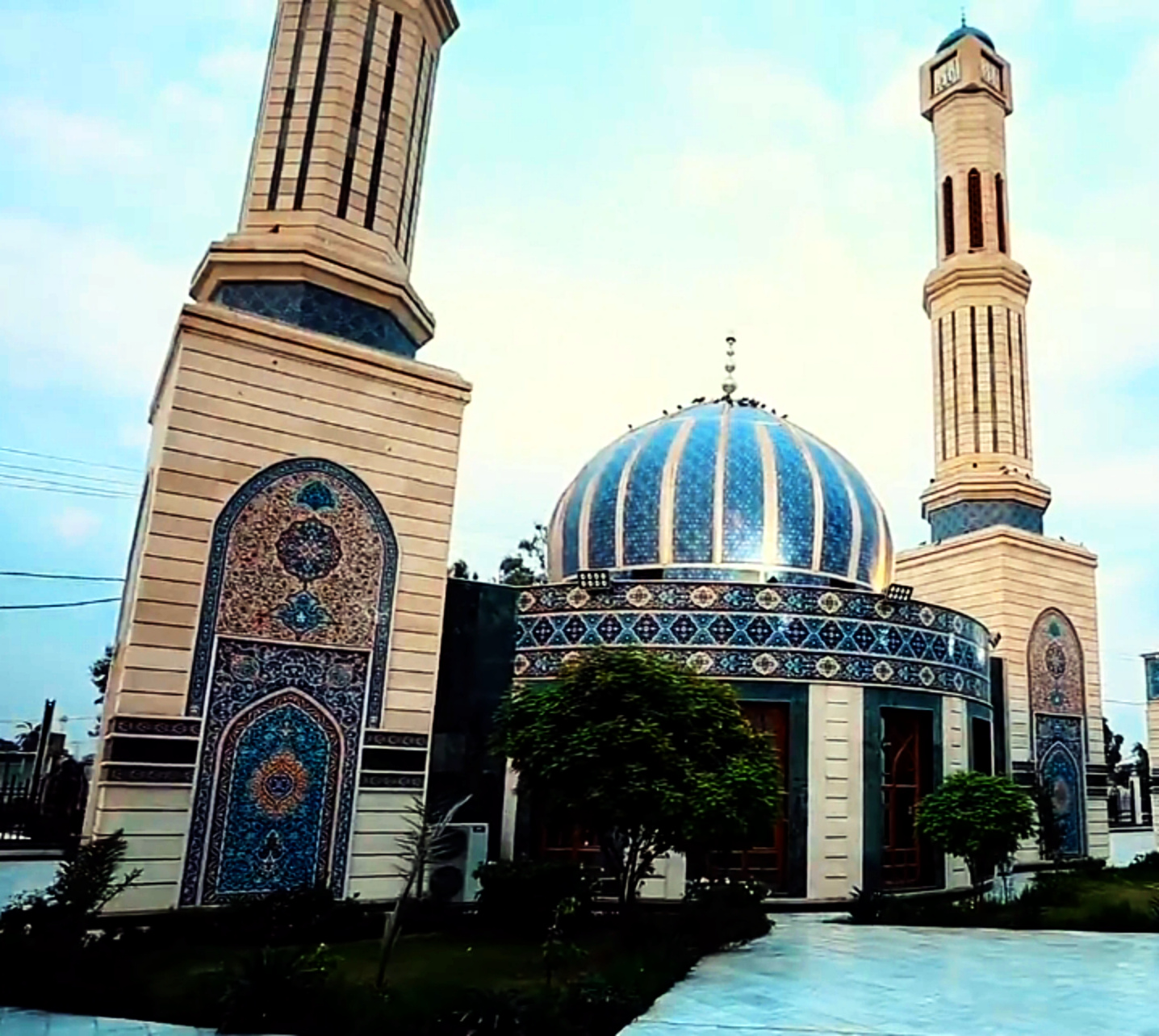
- The mosque in 2018

- Location of the mosque in Iraq

Religion
- Affiliation: Shia (Twelver)
- Ecclesiastical or organisational status: Mosque; Mausoleum
- Status: Active

Location
- Location: Kufa, Najaf Governorate
- Country: Iraq
- Interactive map of Al-Hamra Mosque
- Coordinates: 32°02′24″N 44°24′19″E

Architecture
- Architect: Jawad al-Baghdadi (1924)
- Type: Mosque architecture
- Style: Modern Iraqi
- Completed: 7th century CE; 1086 CE (madrasa); 1895 CE (mihrab); 1924 CE (minaret); 2018 (current structure)
- Destroyed: 1991 (by Ba'athists)

Specifications
- Capacity: 1,000 worshippers
- Dome: Two
- Minaret: Two
- Minaret height: 30 m (98 ft)
- Shrine: One: Jonah / Yunus

Al-Hamra Mosque (Arabic: مسجد الحمراء), also known as the Yunus Ibn Matta Mosque, is a Twelver Shi'ite mosque and mausoleum, located in Kufa, in the Najaf Governorate of Iraq. Established in the 7th century CE, it is one of the oldest places of worship in Kufa. The complex also contains a shrine believed to be dedicated to the biblical Jonah.

== History ==
The first mosque structure was completed in the 7th century CE, during the time of the Rashidun Caliph, Ali ibn Abi Talib. It was named after the Hamra tribe who had allied themselves with Ali and his family, the Ahlulbayt. In 1086 CE, a Sunni madrasa for the Hanafi school of thought was established at the site.

=== Modern era ===
The mihrab of the mosque dates from 1895 CE. In 1924 CE, the first minaret was added to the mosque, funded by donations from Hajj Abd al-Karim, a wealthy businessman who lived in Kufa. The architect involved in this renovation was a local resident of Kufa, Jawad al-Baghdadi.

In 1991, the mosque was demolished during the era of Ba'athist Iraq. After the leadership of Saddam Hussein was overthrown in the Iraq War, plans were made to rebuild the mosque in 2003 with the efforts of Ayatollah al-Sistani. The mosque and its adjoining shrine were finally rebuilt in 2018, and a big ceremony was held to celebrate its reopening.

== Shrine of Yunus (Jonah) ==
Attached to the mosque is the shrine of Jonah, known in Islam as the Prophet Yunus. Shi'i narrations state that Jonah's body lay here during his death, and stayed here until it was carried over to Mosul, where al-Nabi Yunus Mosque once stood before its demolition in 2014 by the Islamic State of Iraq and the Levant. Also, there is a narration from Ali that states Jonah was buried in the shrine.

== In popular culture ==
The mosque was featured in the 2022 Iraqi novel, The Stork Of The Prophet Yunus by Mahmoud Jassim Othman al-Nuaimi.

== Gallery ==
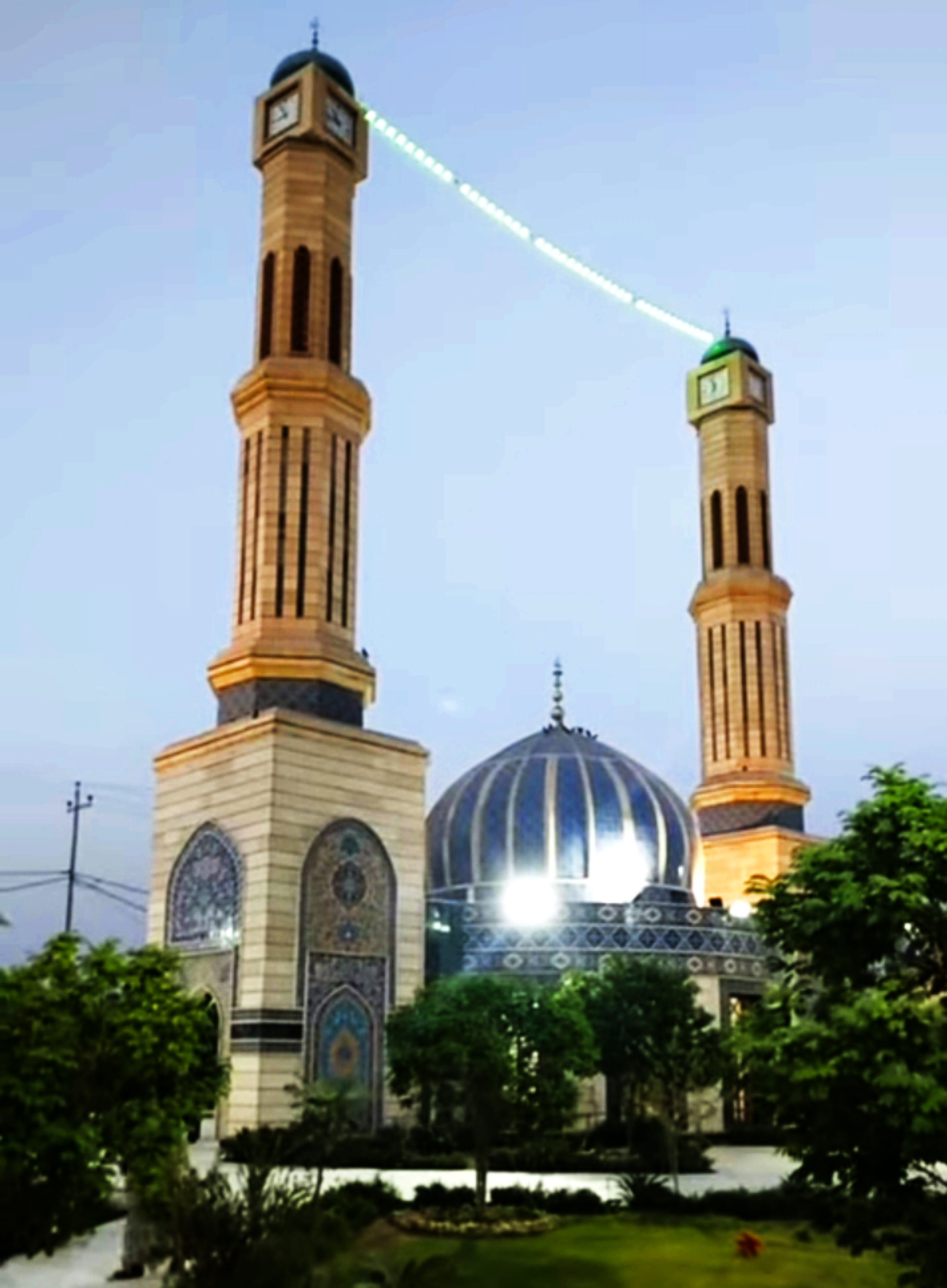
The mosque in the early morning

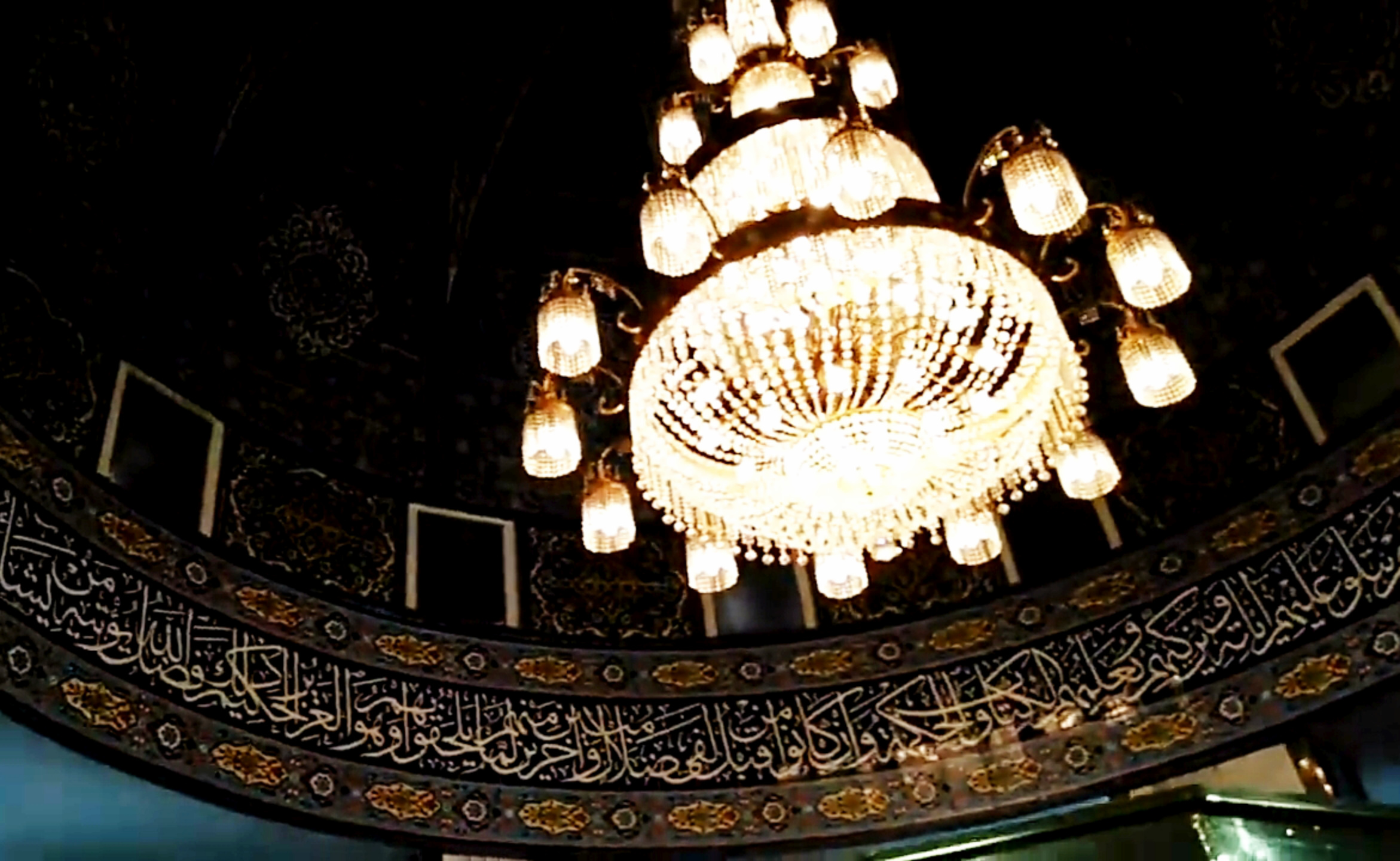
A chandelier hanging from the dome above the shrine dedicated to Jonah

== See also ==
- List of mosques in Iraq
- Islam in Iraq
  - Shia Islam in Iraq
