= Jalil Khayat Mosque =

Mosque in Kurdistan, Iraq

- مزگەوتی جەلیل خەیات
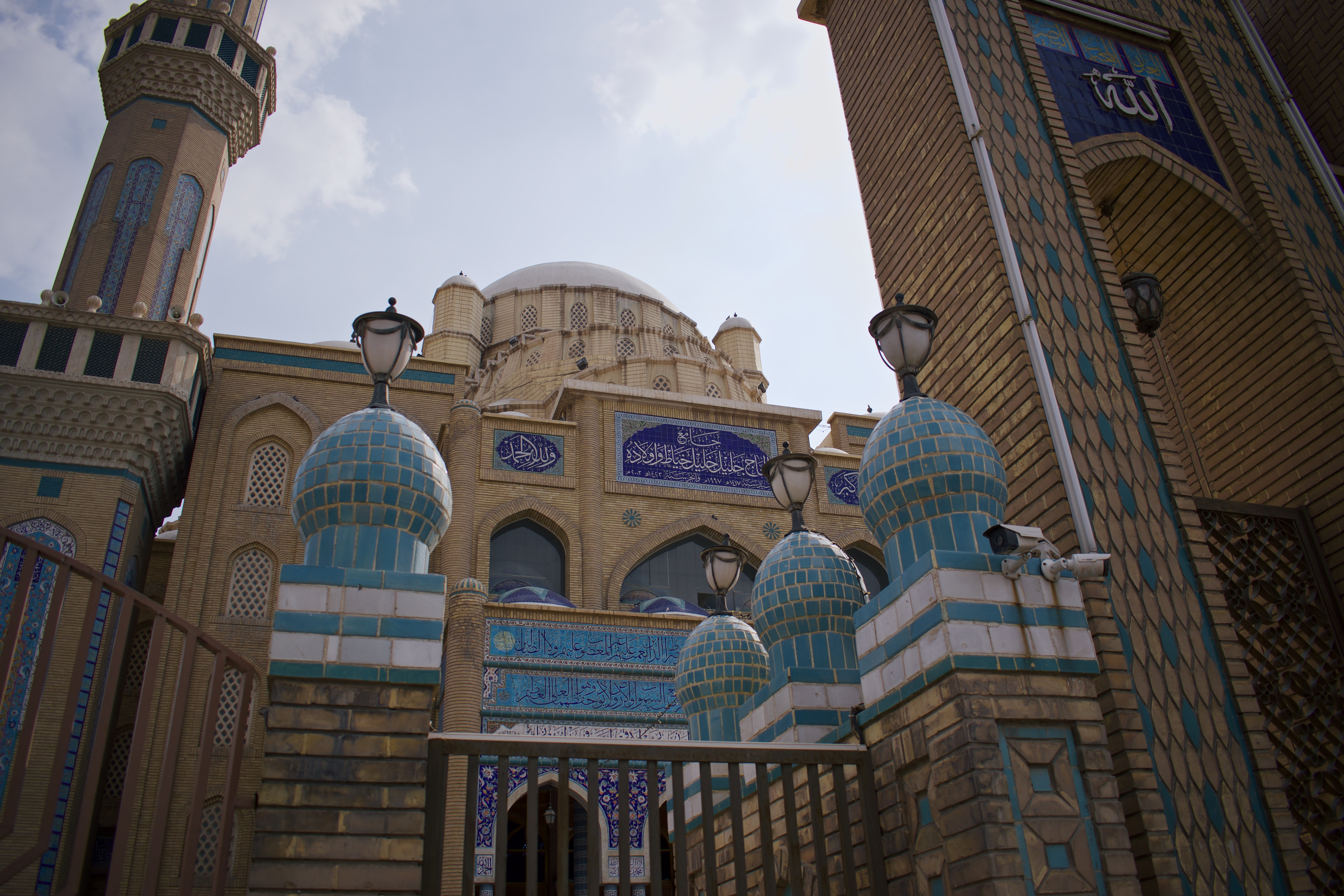

- Location of the mosque in Iraq

Religion
- Affiliation: Sunni Islam
- Ownership: Al-Khayat Family

Location
- Location: Erbil, Kurdistan Region
- Country: Iraq
- Coordinates: 36°12′04″N 44°01′07″E

Architecture
- Type: Mosque architecture
- Style: Abbasid; Ottoman
- Completed: 2007

Specifications
- Capacity: 1,500 – 2,000 worshippers
- Interior area: 15,000 m^{2} (160,000 sq ft)
- Dome: Many
- Dome height (outer): 48 m (157 ft)
- Dome dia. (outer): 20 m (66 ft)
- Minaret: Two

The Jalil Khayat Mosque (Kurdish: مزگەوتی جەلیل خەیات, romanized: Mzgawti Jalil Kayat) is a Sunni mosque in Erbil, in the Kurdistan Region of Iraq. It is the largest mosque in Erbil. The mosque was begun by Jalil Khayat, who later died in 2005, and it was completed in 2007 by his sons in memory of their father. The mosque is located on 60m street, in front of the Van Royal Hotel.

== Architecture ==
The mosque's style resembles the Mosque of Muhammad Ali in Cairo and the Blue mosque in Istanbul. It has been cited as one of the most beautiful mosque interiors. Jalil Khayat's construction company states that the mosque was completed in a modern interpretation of the Abbasid and Ottoman architectural styles. The height of the main dome is 48 metres (157 ft), and the diameter is 20 metres (66 ft), with four half domes and twelve quarter domes surrounding it. The mosque is 15,000 square metres (160,000 sq ft) and holds approximately 1,500 to 2,000 worshippers.

== See also ==
- Islam in Iraq
- List of mosques in Iraq
- Sorani
