= Great Mosque of Sulaymaniyah =

Mosque in Sulaymaniyah, Iraq

- مزگەوتی گەورەی سلێمانی
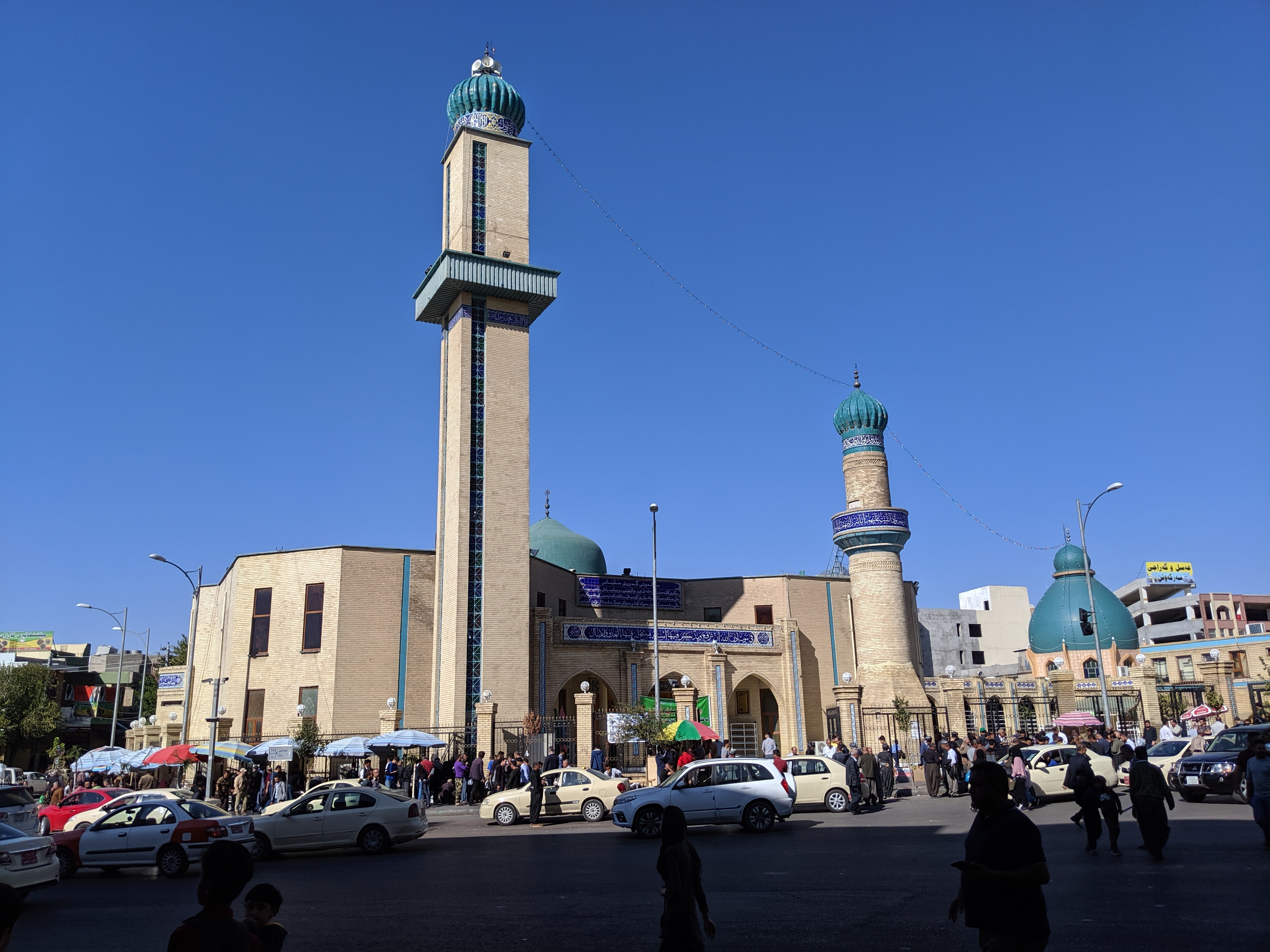
- The mosque in 2019

- Location of the mosque in Iraq

Religion
- Affiliation: Sunni Islam
- Ecclesiastical or organizational status: Mosque and mausoleum
- Status: Active

Location
- Location: Sulaymaniyah, Sulaymaniyah Governorate, Kurdistan Region
- Country: Iraq
- Interactive map of Great Mosque of Sulaymaniyah
- Coordinates: 35°33′29″N 45°26′26″E

Architecture
- Type: Islamic architecture
- Founder: Ibrahim Pasha Baban
- Completed: 1785 CE

Specifications
- Dome: Two
- Minaret: Two
- Site area: 6,000 m^{2} (65,000 sq ft)
- Shrines: Two: Haji Kaka Ahmad; Mahmud Barzanji

The Great Mosque of Sulaymaniyah (Kurdish: مزگەوتی گەورەی سلێمانی), also known as the Grand Mosque (Kurdish: مزگەوتی گەورە, romanized: Mizgewtî Gewre) and as the Sheikh Ahmad Mosque, is a Sunni mosque located in Sulaymaniyah, in the Sulaymaniyah Governorate, in the Kurdistan Region of Iraq. The mosque contains the tomb of Haji Kaka Ahmad, a Kurdish cleric who was known for his donations of food to the needy.

Founded in 1784 CE and completed in the following year by the Baban Emir Ibrahim Pasha Baban, the mosque also contains a shrine dedicated to Mahmud Barzanji, a Kurdish leader who fought against the British occupation of Iraq. It is regarded as the first mosque in Sulaymaniyah. Attached to the mosque building is the mausoleum for the Baban family, a powerful family of Emirs who assisted the Ottoman Empire in the Safavid-Ottoman War and built the modern city of Sulaymaniyah.

== History ==
The mosque was originally a structure made from mud brick and clay. In 1940, 1950, and finally, in 1968, the mosque was completely rebuilt with brick, while maintaining the same layout and certain details of the original building. A minaret was added to the mosque in 1880 under the orders of Sultan Abdul Hamid II. Haji Kaka Ahmad opened a cafeteria next to the mosque to serve food during an economic crisis in 1820. He died in 1887 and was buried in a corner of the mosque, and that corner was developed into his shrine.

== Architecture ==
The mosque is entered from the northern portal which leads into the courtyard. Then, on the northern side of the mosque a long hallway is present. There is also a prayer hall for the season of summer. On the left of this prayer hall is a room for religious teachers, as well as a large library that contains valuable religious books. The main prayer hall of the mosque was expanded while following an architectural design in a classical Islamic style, whilst at the same time evoking the old style of the former mud brick structure, with Qur'anic verses on its facade.

Next to the prayer hall is a pathway leading to the royal mausoleum of the Baban family. It is topped by a dome. The tomb of Haji Kaka Ahmad and his grandson, Mahmud Barzanji, is located within the mosque in a room at one of the corners, and a zarih is built around his grave.

== Usage ==
The mosque is used for daily prayers. The cafeteria in the mosque is still active, and it serves meals to those in need. It also serves food for iftar during the holy month of Ramadan. Currently, the mosque is supervised by Muhammad Shaykh Salar, who is a grandson of Haji Kaka Ahmad.

== See also ==
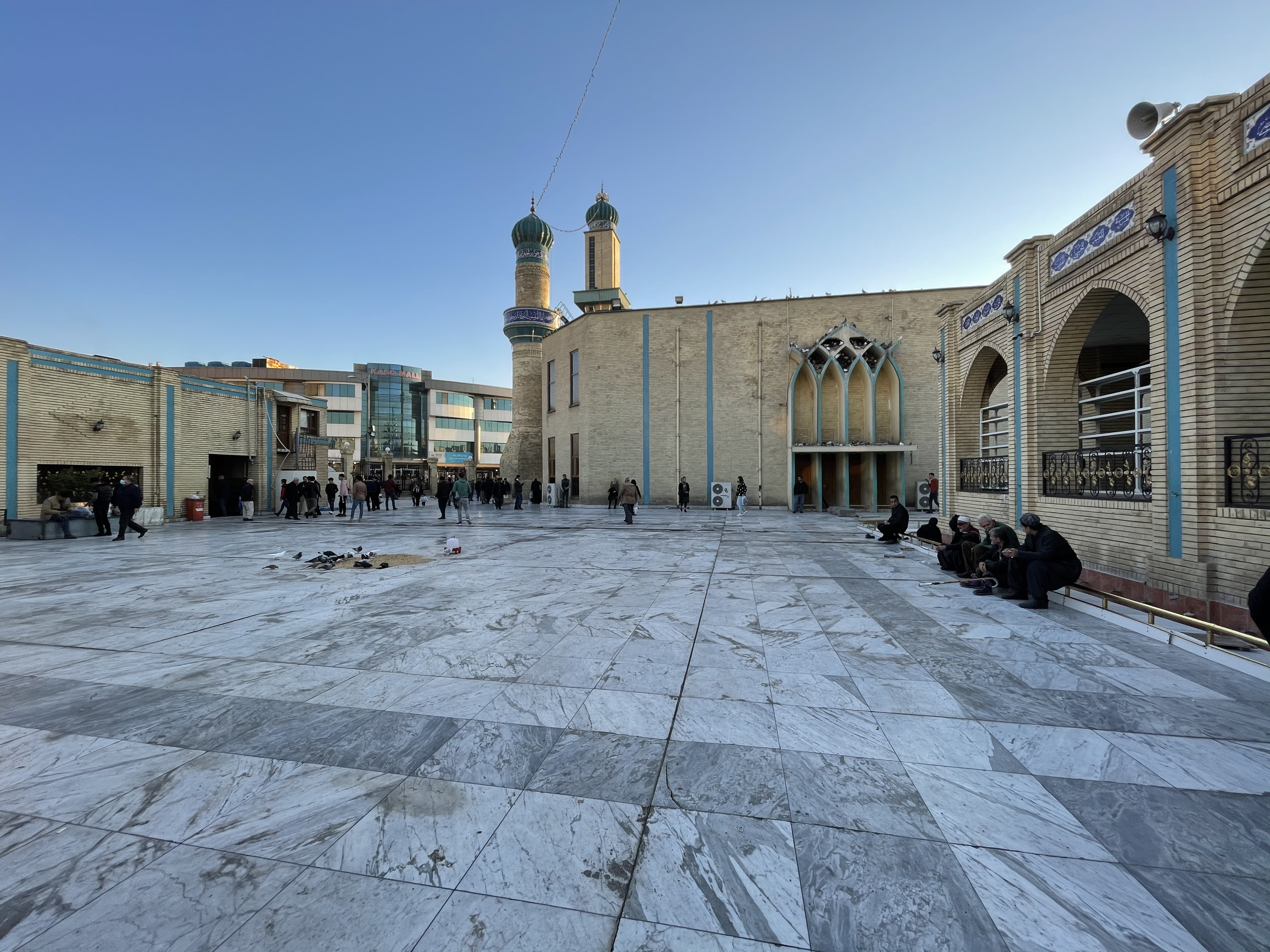
The courtyard

- Islam in Iraq
- List of mosques in Iraq
