= Sayyidah Zaynab Mosque (Sinjar) =

Mosque in Sinjar, Ninawa, Iraq

- قُبَّة سِتْنَا زَيْنَب
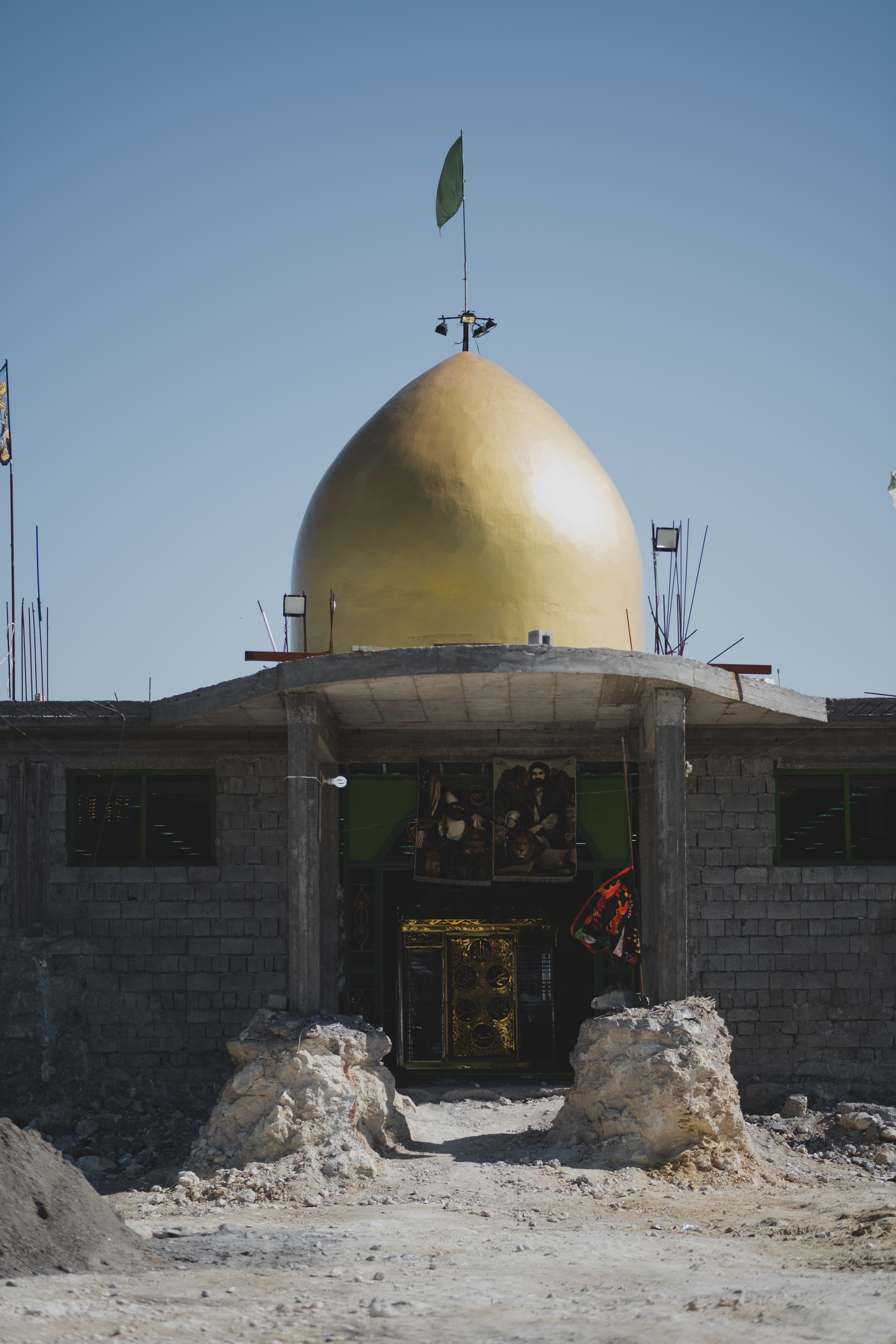
- The partially reconstructed mosque in 2019

Religion
- Affiliation: Shia Islam
- Ecclesiastical or organizational status: Mosque and mausoleum
- Status: Active

Location
- Location: Sinjar, Ninawa Governorate
- Country: Iraq

Architecture
- Type: Mosque architecture
- Founder: Badr al-Din Lu'lu'
- Completed: 1239 CE (mausoleum); 1312 CE (restoration); 1693 CE (restoration); 2020 (reconstruction)
- Destroyed: 2014 (by ISIL)

Specifications
- Dome: Three
- Shrine: One: Sayyidah Zaynab
- Materials: Granite; marble; mirrors; gold leaf

The Sayyidah Zaynab Mosque (Arabic: قُبَّة سِتْنَا زَيْنَب, romanized: Qubbat Sitnā Zaynab, lit. 'Mausoleum of Sitna Zaynab') is a Shi'ite mosque and mausoleum located in Sinjar, in the Nineveh Governorate of Iraq. The original mausoleum was built in 1239 CE by Badr al-Din Lu'lu' as part of a ruling strategy to promote Shia Islam by sponsoring the erection of shrines and tombs dedicated to Imams throughout the governorate. The mosque was completely destroyed by the Islamic State of Iraq and the Levant and was reconstructed in 2020.

== History ==
The original mausoleum was dated from 1239 CE. It was built over a tomb believed to be that of Sayyidah Zaynab, the daughter of the fourth Shia Imam, Ali ibn Husayn Zayn Al-Abidin, also known as Imam al-Sajjad.

The building was severely damaged by the 13th century Mongol Invasion but was restored by the Muslim Mongol Ilkhanate ruler Öljaitü in 1312 for the Friday prayers. In 1693 the Pasha ben Khada renovated the place completely.

The mosque and shrine of Sayyida Zaynab were destroyed using explosive devices by ISIL in 2014.

== Architecture ==
The main part of the 13th-century mausoleum, the shrine and tomb of Zaynab, is a large chamber topped with a conical ribbed dome. The dome's structure is similar to the dome seen on the Mashhad Imam Awn Al-Din in Mosul. The tomb itself is a stone sarcophagus with Qur'anic inscriptions on it.

Next to Sayyidah Zaynab's mausoleum is a musalla. It is topped by a ribbed circular dome and contains a mihrab made out of gypsum. The mihrab occupies the entire Qibla wall. Other rooms have been added to the building but do not feature any decorations.

=== Reconstruction ===
When the shrine was rebuilt, it differed greatly from the original structure. A zarih was constructed around the sarcophagus. Reconstruction of the ruined shrine was overseen by the Imam Ali Brigades, an Iranian-backed Shia paramilitary group. Completed in 2020, the new mosque and mausoleum sports a golden dome with a mirrored ceiling, granite columns, and marble floor.

== Gallery ==
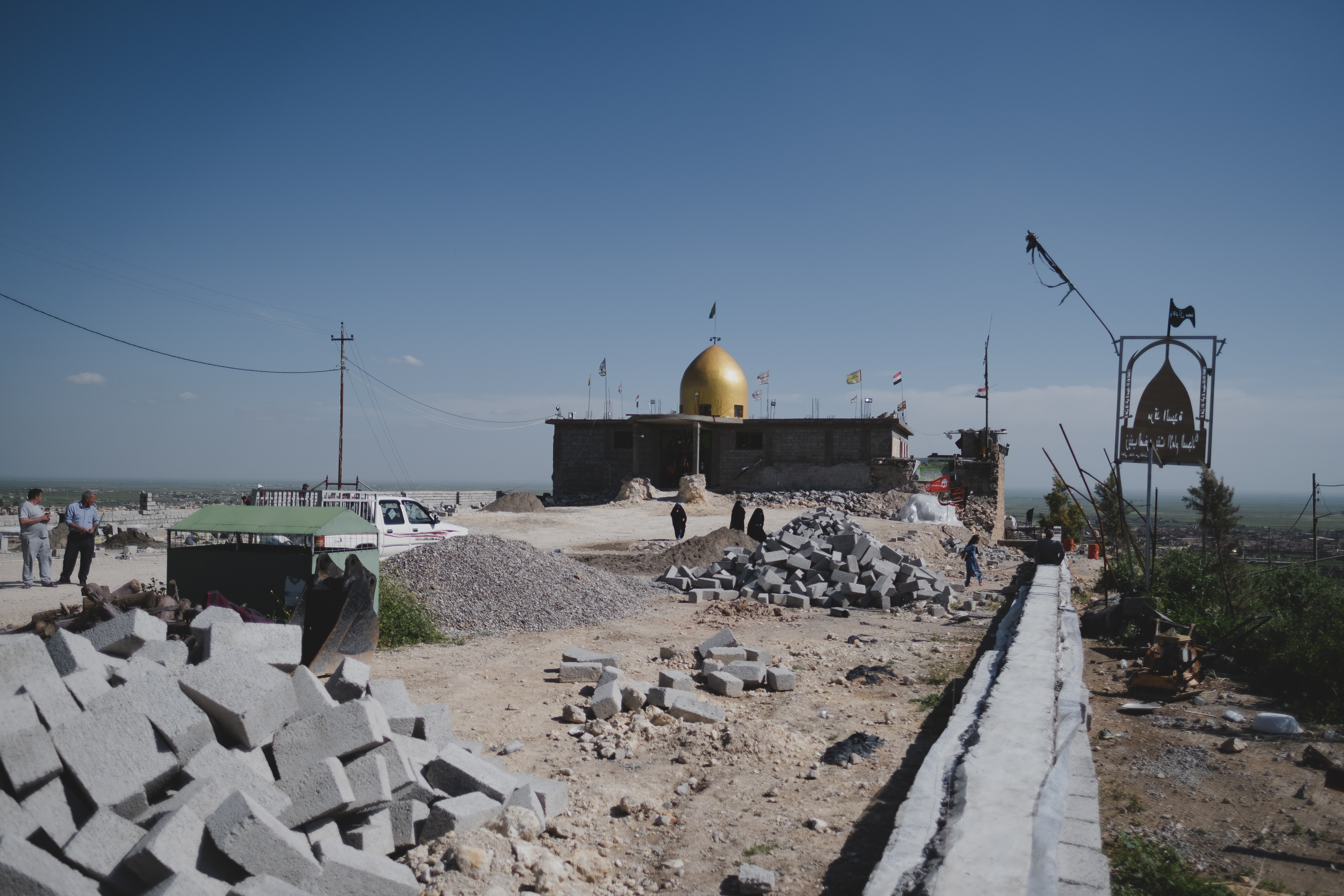
A view of the partially reconstructed mosque in 2019

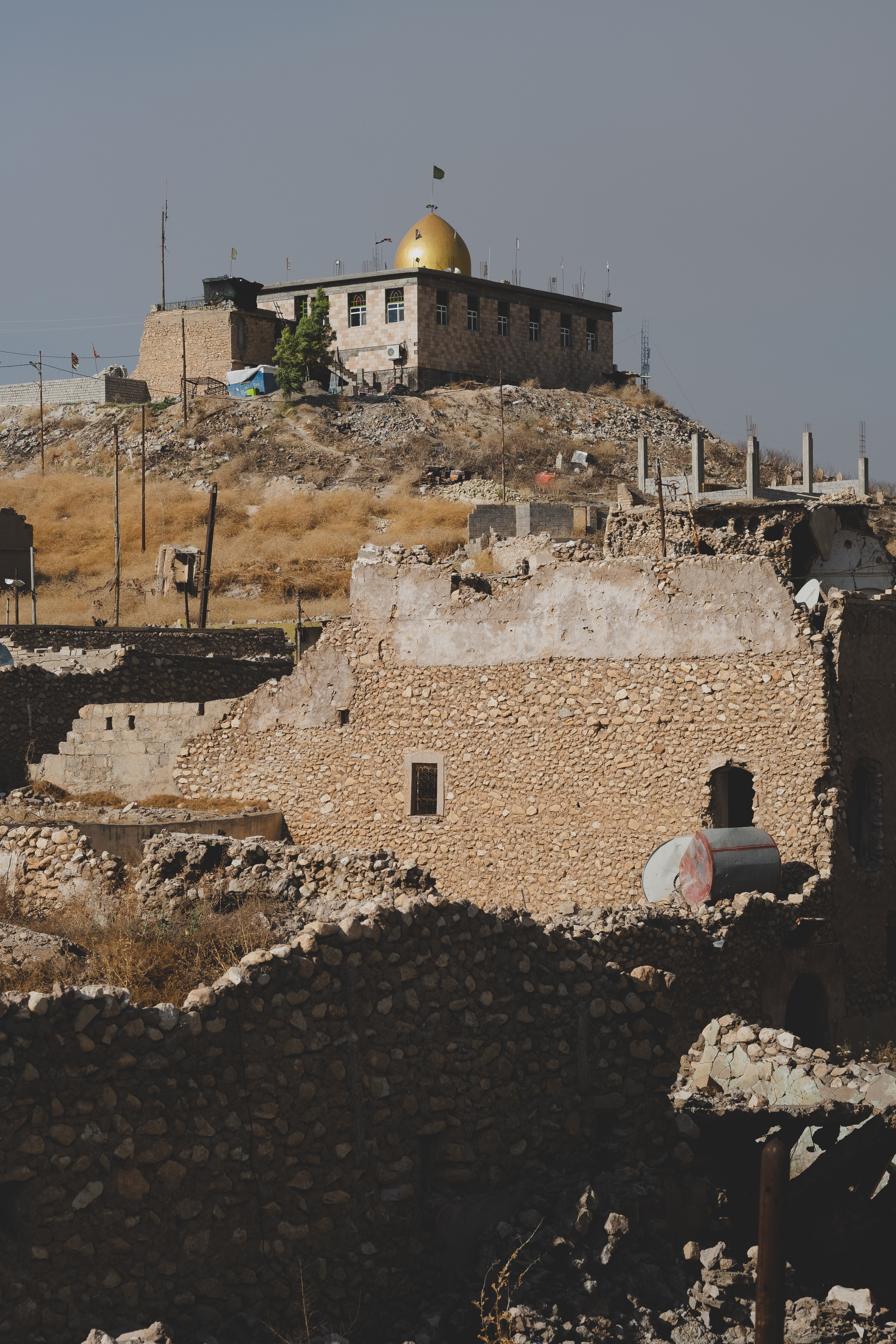
The partially reconstructed mosque, viewed from a distance in 2019

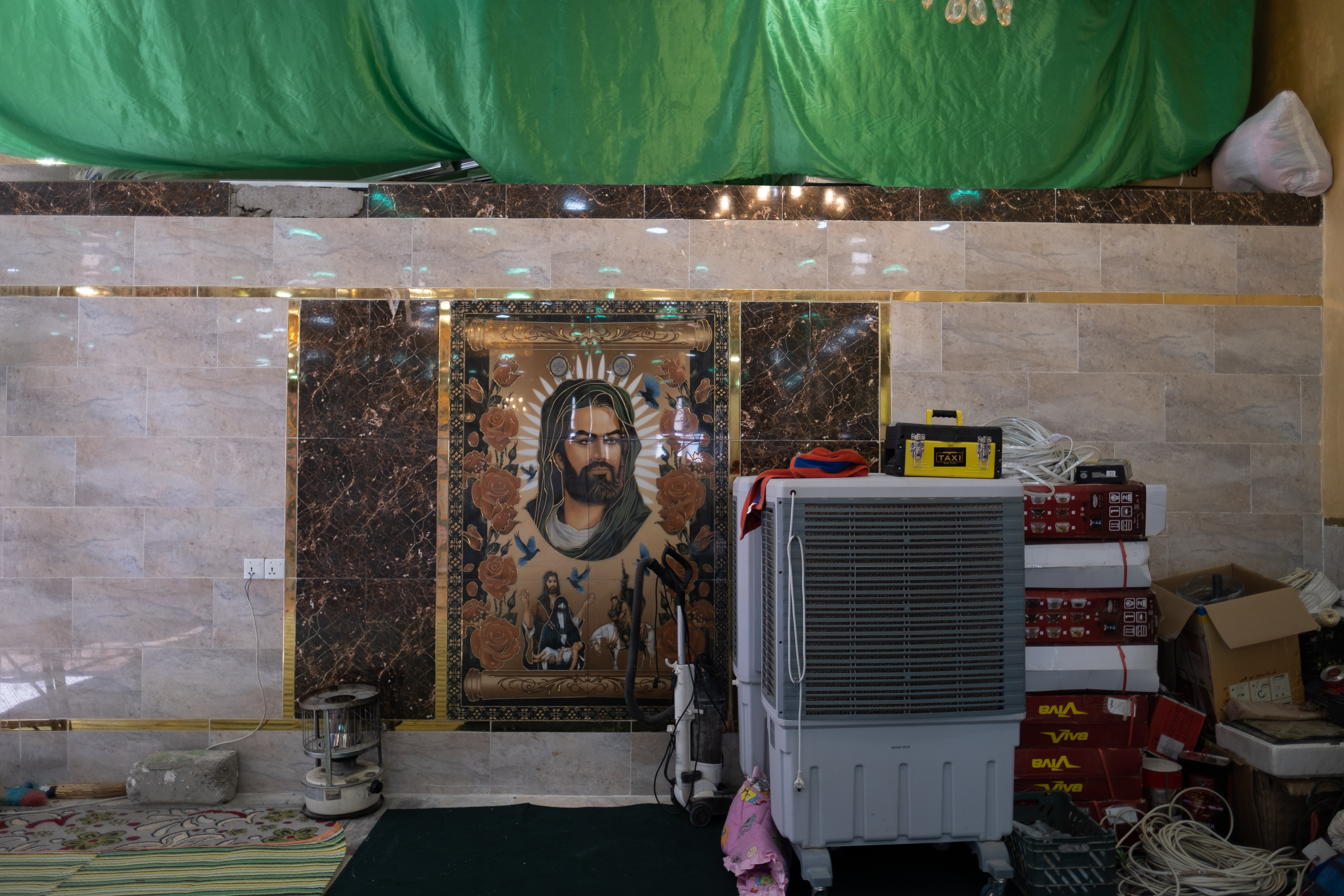
The shrine interior in 2019

== See also ==
- Destruction of cultural heritage by the Islamic State
- Islam in Iraq
- List of mosques in Iraq
