= Imam Saad bin Aqil' Shrine =

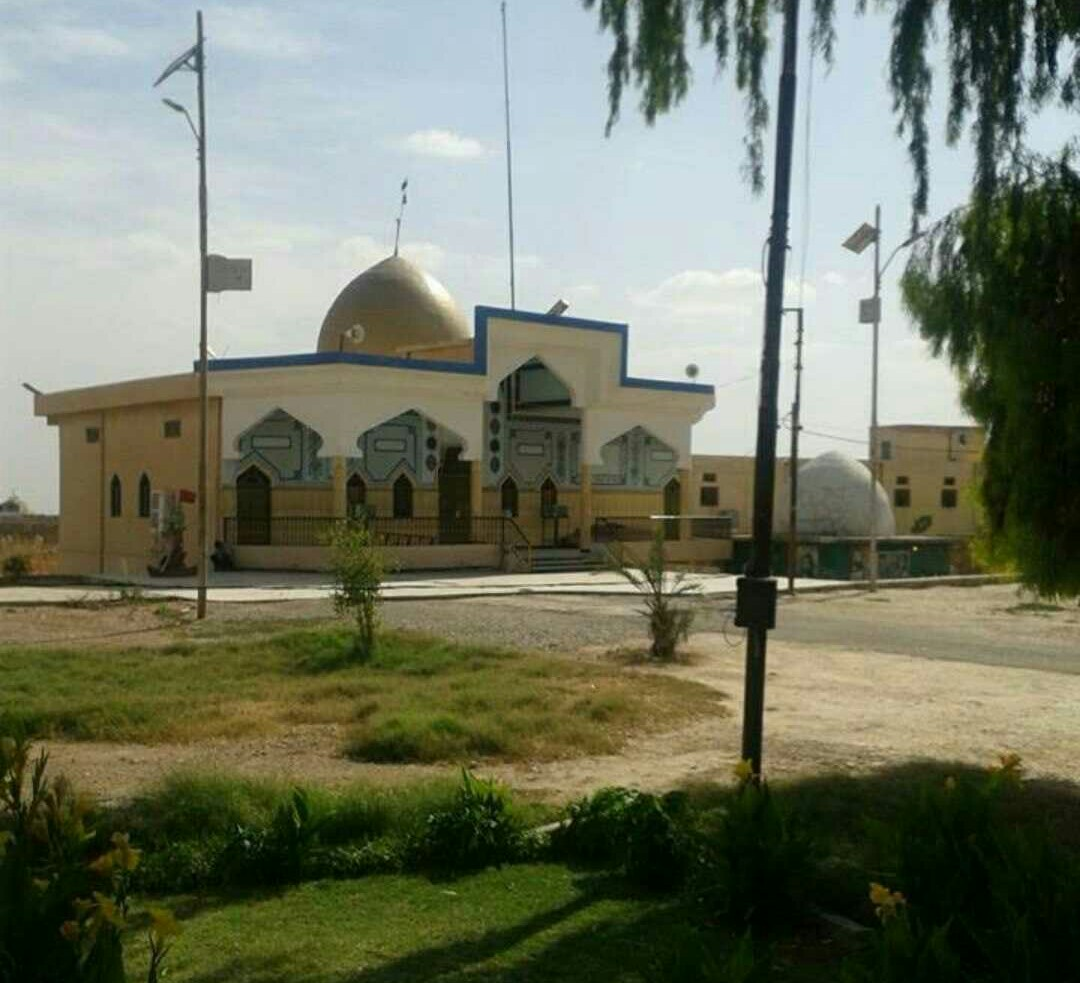
- The shrine in 2011

- Location within Iraq

Religion
- Affiliation: Twelver Shi'a
- Province: Nineveh Governorate

Location
- Location: Tal Afar, Iraq
- Interactive map of Imam Saad bin Aqil' Shrine
- Coordinates: 36°22′20″N 42°27′02″E

Architecture
- Completed: 1142

The Imam Saad bin Aqil' Shrine (Arabic: ) is located at Tal Afar, Iraq. The 12th-century shrine contains the tomb of Saad ibn Aqil, a descendant of Aqeel ibn Abi Talib and the governor of Upper Mesopotamia.

== History ==
The shrine was established by Muhammad ibn Ali ibn Mansour al-Amadi, known as Jamal al-Din, in the year 1142.

=== 2014 destruction ===
The shrine was destroyed in June 2014, by the Islamic State of Iraq and the Levant. According to the militants, the place had become a temple for the worship of Husayn ibn Ali, second Imam of the Ahlulbayt. 32 other buildings, including mosques, shrines and Hussainiyahs, were destroyed as well.

=== 2019 reconstruction ===
After the ISIL terrorists were defeated and expelled from the city, the Imam Saad bin Aqil' shrine was rebuilt by the Imam Ali Brigades, along with several other Shi'ite shrines in Tal Afar.

== See also ==
List of mosques in Iraq
