= Al-Kahla District =

Coordinates: 31.64835°N 47.55507°E

Al-Kahla District Arabic: قضاء الكحلاء
- District
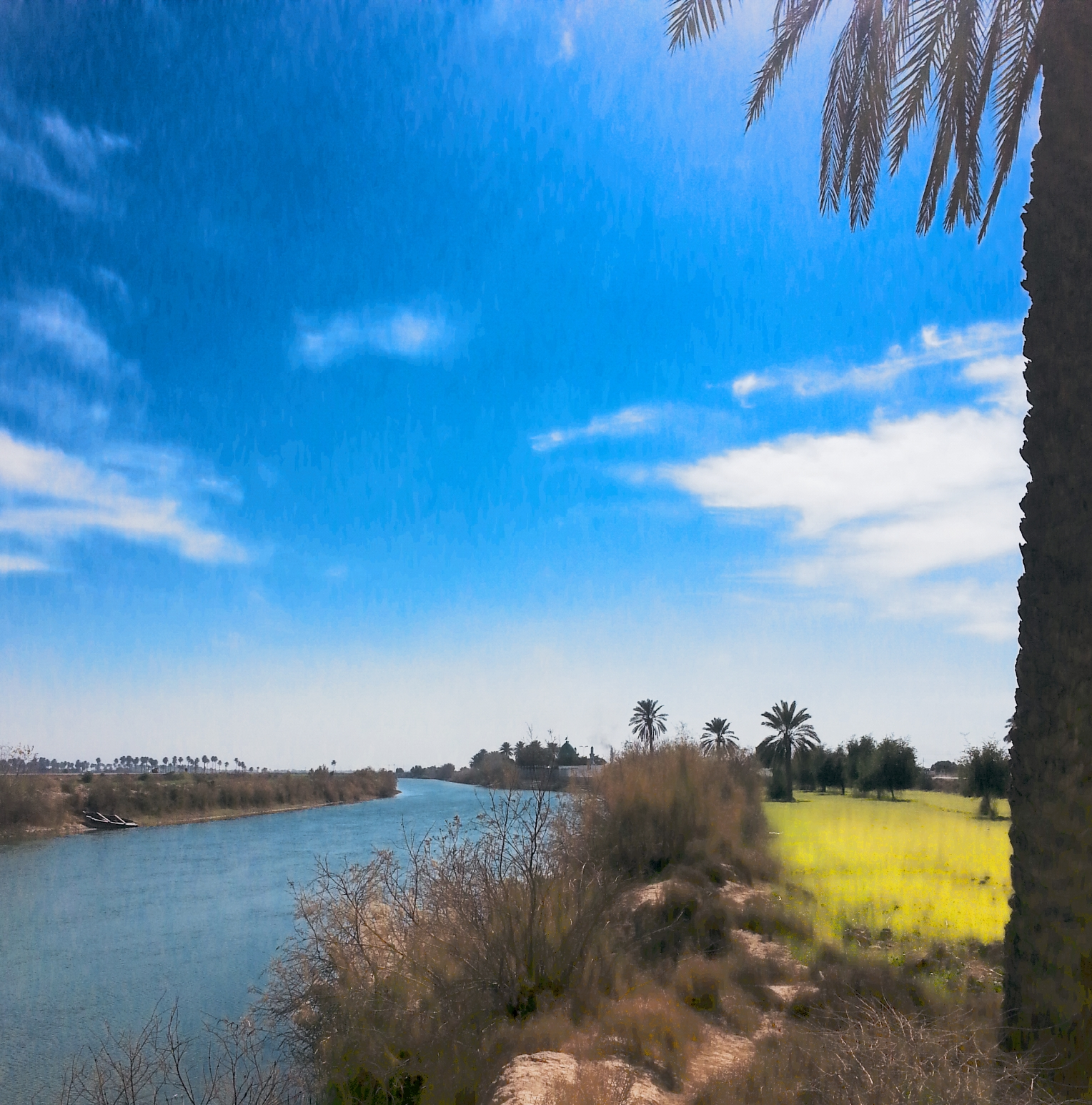
- Interactive map of Al-Kahla District
- Country: Iraq
- Governorate: Maysan Governorate
- Seat: Al-Kahla
- Time zone: UTC+3 (AST)

Al-Kahla District (Arabic: قضاء الكحلاء) is a district of the Maysan Governorate, Iraq. According to data from the Iraqi Planning Ministry, Al-Kalha has a poverty rate of 79.9%, the highest rate of all Iraq's urban regions.
