= List of largest cities of Iraq =

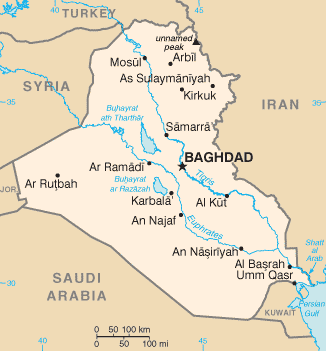
Map of Iraq

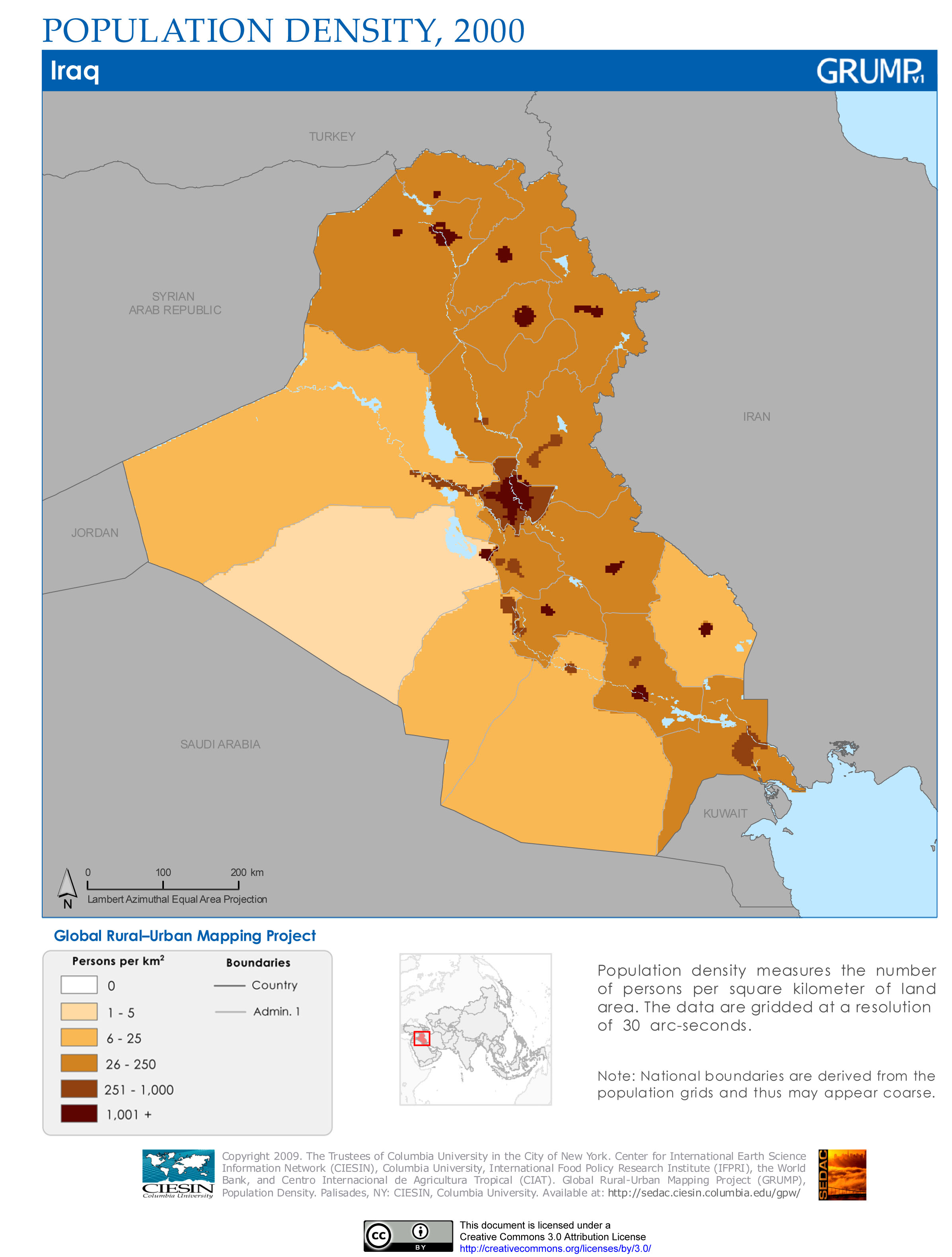
Iraq population density, 2000

This article shows a list of largest cities and towns in Iraq.

== List ==
This list includes the 80 most populous cities, towns, and sub-districts of Iraq, as of the most recent population and housing census of 2024.

N°	City or Town	Governorate	Census 1987	Est. 2009	Est. 2018	Census 2024
1	Baghdad	Baghdad	3,841,268	5,521,242	6,719,477	7,837,463
2	Mosul	Nineveh	664,221	1,136,990	1,361,819	1,529,384
3	Basra	Basra	406,296	1,091,627	1,340,827	1,293,052
4	Kirkuk	Kirkuk	418,624	782,143	972,272	1,249,197
5	Erbil	Erbil	585,968	725,356	879,071	1,001,219
6	Najaf	Najaf	309,010	617,125	747,261	830,664
7	Sulaymaniyah	Sulaymaniyah	364,096	559,685	676,492	828,850
8	Karbala	Karbala	296,705	588,283	711,530	784,219
9	Nasiriyah	Dhi Qar	265,937	455,721	558,446	704,976
10	Amarah	Maysan	208,797	428,804	527,472	668,356
11	Kut	Wasit	183,183	312,610	389,376	506,067
12	Hillah	Babylon	268,834	373,063	455,741	470,917
13	Duhok	Duhok		280,137	340,871	452,967
14	Diwaniyah	Qādisiyyah	196,519	332,124	403,796	396,257
15	Zubayr	Basra		244,855	300,751	
16	Baqubah	Diyala		227,785	279,133	
17	Fallujah	Al Anbar		203,451	250,884	
18	Ramadi	Al Anbar	192,556	181,264	223,525	
19	Samawah	Muthanna		179,140	221,743	
20	Zakho	Duhok		174,197	211,964	398,876
21	Abu Al-Khaseeb	Basra		165,102	203,155	
22	Al-Shatrah	Dhi Qar		148,664	182,175	
23	Tal Afar	Nineveh		143,982	172,453	
24	Kufa	Najaf		141,472	171,305	
25	Kalar	Sulaymaniyah		120,099	145,164	
26	Samarra	Saladin		119,022	144,771	
27	Shatt Al-Arab	Basra		108,277	132,995	
28	Soran	Erbil		100,512	131,813	179,596
29	Suq al-Shuyukh	Dhi Qar		107,373	131,576	
30	Al-Shamal	Nineveh		106,875	128,007	
31	Al-Qurnah	Basra		102,936	126,434	
32	Al-Wahda	Baghdad		91,071	110,836	
33	Tikrit	Saladin		89,584	108,964	
34	Tuz Khurmatu	Saladin		84,323	102,565	
35	Al-Mahmudiyah	Baghdad		83,336	101,421	
36	Iskandariya	Babylon		82,366	100,619	
37	Al-Mejar Al-Kabir	Maysan		76,365	93,937	
38	Ranya	Sulaymaniyah		76,111	91,995	197,700
39	Hamza	Qādisiyyah		71,346	86,743	
40	Al-Rumaitha	Muthanna		69,528	86,063	
41	Al-Hay	Wasit		68,640	85,496	
42	Al-Hindiya	Karbala		69,504	84,065	
43	Baiji	Saladin		68,170	82,918	
44	Al-Qasim	Babylon		66,713	81,498	
45	Muqdadiyah	Diyala		65,038	79,699	
46	Al-Suwaira	Wasit		61,954	77,168	
47	Al-Rifa'i	Dhi Qar		60,885	74,609	
48	Al-Qa'im	Al Anbar		60,055	74,056	
49	Qaladiza	Sulaymaniyah		61,182	73,951	
50	Simele	Duhok		58,808	71,557	
51	An Numaniyah	Wasit		56,988	70,982	
52	Fayda	Nineveh		57,610	69,001	
53	Akre	Duhok		55,691	68,093	
54	Halabja	Halabja		55,588	67,190	
55	Hit	Al Anbar		54,055	66,657	
56	Kasnazan	Erbil		54,391	65,917	
57	Chamchamal	Sulaymaniyah		54,003	65,274	
58	Balad Ruz	Diyala		52,122	63,871	
59	Al Nasr Wal Salam	Baghdad		52,245	63,584	
60	Al Khalis	Diyala		51,003	62,500	
61	Jalawla	Diyala		50,690	62,117	
62	Koy Sanjaq	Erbil		51,196	62,046	
63	Said Sadiq	Sulaymaniyah		50,995	61,638	
64	Balad	Saladin		49,281	59,943	
65	Al Midhatiya	Babylon		48,672	59,458	
66	Bnaslawa	Erbil		48,035	58,214	
67	Al-Shamiya	Qādisiyyah		47,711	58,007	
68	Musayyib	Babylon		46,934	57,335	
69	Qahtaniyah	Nineveh		47,385	56,755	
70	Qasrok	Duhok		46,357	56,407	
71	Al-Aziziyah	Wasit		44,868	55,886	
72	Al-Shirqat	Saladin		44,912	54,629	
73	Haji Awa	Sulaymaniyah		44,440	53,714	
74	Daratu	Erbil		44,308	53,697	
75	Qalat Sukkar	Dhi Qar		43,551	53,367	
76	Şoriş	Sulaymaniyah		42,703	51,615	
77	Khanaqin	Diyala		42,057	51,538	
78	Al-Nasr	Dhi Qar		41,698	51,097	
79	Umm Qasr	Basra		40,531	49,783	
80	Al-Gharraf	Dhi Qar		39,624	48,556	

== Ancient cities and towns ==
- Babylon (ܒܒܝܠ) (بابل)
- Ctesiphon (Al-Mada'in, المدائن)
- Eridu (إريدو)
- Hatra (حضر)
- Kish (كيش)
- Lagash (لجش)
- Nineveh (ܢܝܢܘܐ) (نينوى)
- Nippur (نيبور)
- Nuzi (Nuzu)
- Samarra
- Shenna (Sinn Barimma)
- Sumer (سومر)
- Tell Ubaid (تل عبيد)
- Ur (أور)
- Uruk (أوروك)
- Lubdu
- Arrapḫa (now Kirkuk)

== See also ==
- List of places in Iraq
- Districts of Iraq
