= List of wars and battles involving the Quds Force =

The following is a list of conflicts involving the Quds Force, part of Iran's Islamic Revolutionary Guard Corps (IRGC). The unit is a special force responsible for extraterritorial operations.

== Wars ==
- Iran–Iraq War
- 1982 Lebanon War (1982)
- South Lebanon conflict (1985–2000)
- Bosnian War
- War in Afghanistan (2001)
- Iraq War (2003–2011)
- Lebanon War (2006)
- Gaza–Israel conflict (2006–present)
- Syrian Civil War (2011–2024)
  - Iranian support for Syria in the Syrian Civil War
- Military intervention against the Islamic State of Iraq and the Levant
  - Iranian intervention in Iraq (2014–present)
- 2015 military intervention in Yemen (alleged)

== Battles ==
Name	Date	Opposing force	Location	Campaign	Outcome
Battle of Herat	12 November 2001	(Afghanistan) Taliban	(Afghanistan) Herat	Afghanistan War	Victory
Karbala raid (alleged)	20 January 2007	United States	(Iraq) Karbala	Iraq War	Tactical Victory
Al-Qusayr offensive	4 April–8 June 2013	Free Syrian Army; Al-Nusra Front	(Syria) Al-Qusayr	Syrian Civil War	Decisive Victory
Siege of Amirli	11 June–31 August 2014	(Islamic State) ISIL	(Iraq) Amirli	War on ISIL	Victory
Operation Ashura	24–26 October 2014	(Islamic State) ISIL	(Iraq) Jurf Al Sakhar	War on ISIL	Victory
Battle of Baiji	29 October 2014 – 22 October 2015	(Islamic State) ISIL	(Iraq) Baiji	War on ISIL	Decisive Victory
Southern Syria offensive	7 February–13 March 2015	Free Syrian Army; Islamic Front; Al-Nusra Front	(Syria) Daraa, Rif Dimashq, Quneitra	Syrian Civil War	Victory/Stalemate
2nd Battle of Tikrit	2 March–17 April 2015	(Islamic State) ISIL	(Iraq) Tikrit	War on ISIL	Decisive Victory
