= Al-Mahawil District =

District in Babil Governorate, Iraq

Coordinates: 32.61448°N 44.61764°E

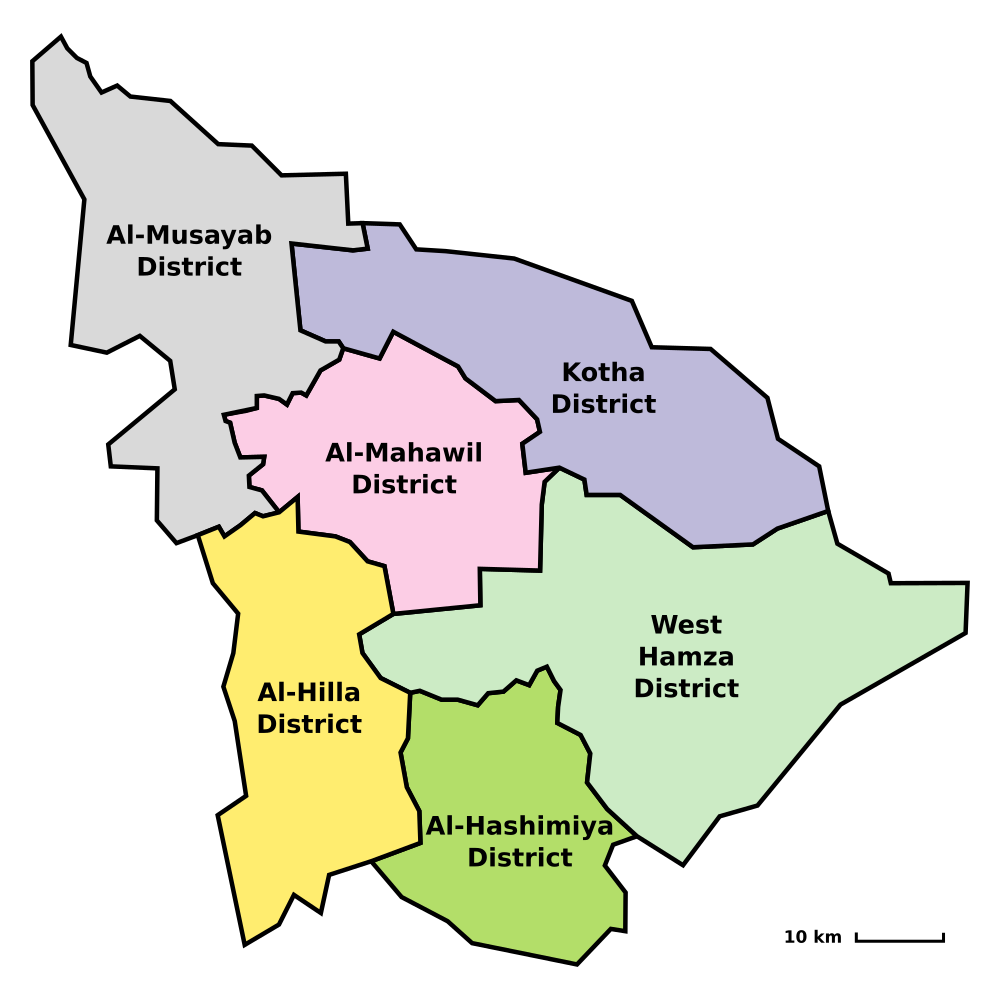
Map of Babil Governorate showing districts

Al-Mahawil (المحاويل) is a district in Babil Governorate, Iraq. It is centred on the town of Al-Mahawil.

Al-Mahawil occupies 665.4 km². As of November 25, 2024, the population of the Al-Mahawil District was 268,266 people according to census data.

== Cities ==
- Al-Mahawil
