= Mausoleum of Maytham al-Tammar =

Shi'ite religious complex in Kufa, Iraq

- مرقد ميثم التمار
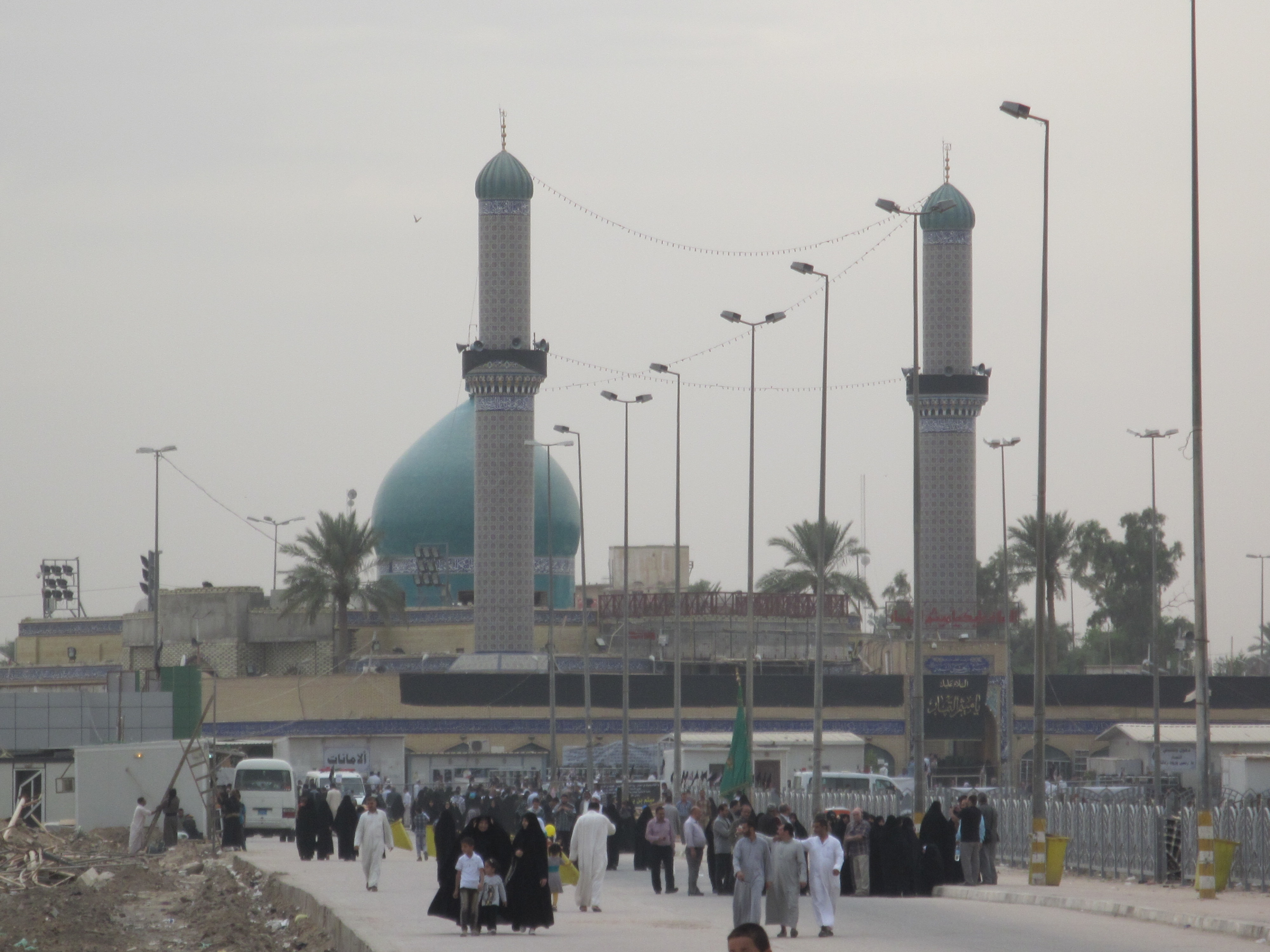

- Location in Kufa, Iraq

Religion
- Affiliation: Shia Islam
- Province: Najaf province
- Rite: Twelver Shi'a
- Ecclesiastical or organizational status: Mosque and shrine
- Status: Active

Location
- Location: Kufa, Iraq
- Interactive map of Mausoleum of Maytham al-Tammar
- Coordinates: 32°1′35.391″N 44°23′41.973″E

Architecture
- Type: mosque, mausoleum
- Completed: Unknown, but present building is modern (2011)

Specifications
- Dome: 1
- Dome dia. (outer): 9 metres
- Dome dia. (inner): 9 metres
- Minaret: 2
- Minaret height: 28 metres
- Shrine: 1

The Mausoleum of Maytham al-Tammar (Arabic: مرقد ميثم التمار) is a Shi'ite religious complex located in Kufa, Iraq. It is dedicated to Maytham ibn Yahya al-Tammar, a companion of Ali ibn Abi Talib who was executed by the Umayyad governor Ubayd Allah ibn Ziyad. The mosque and shrine complex is located to the west of the Great Mosque of Kufa.

== History ==
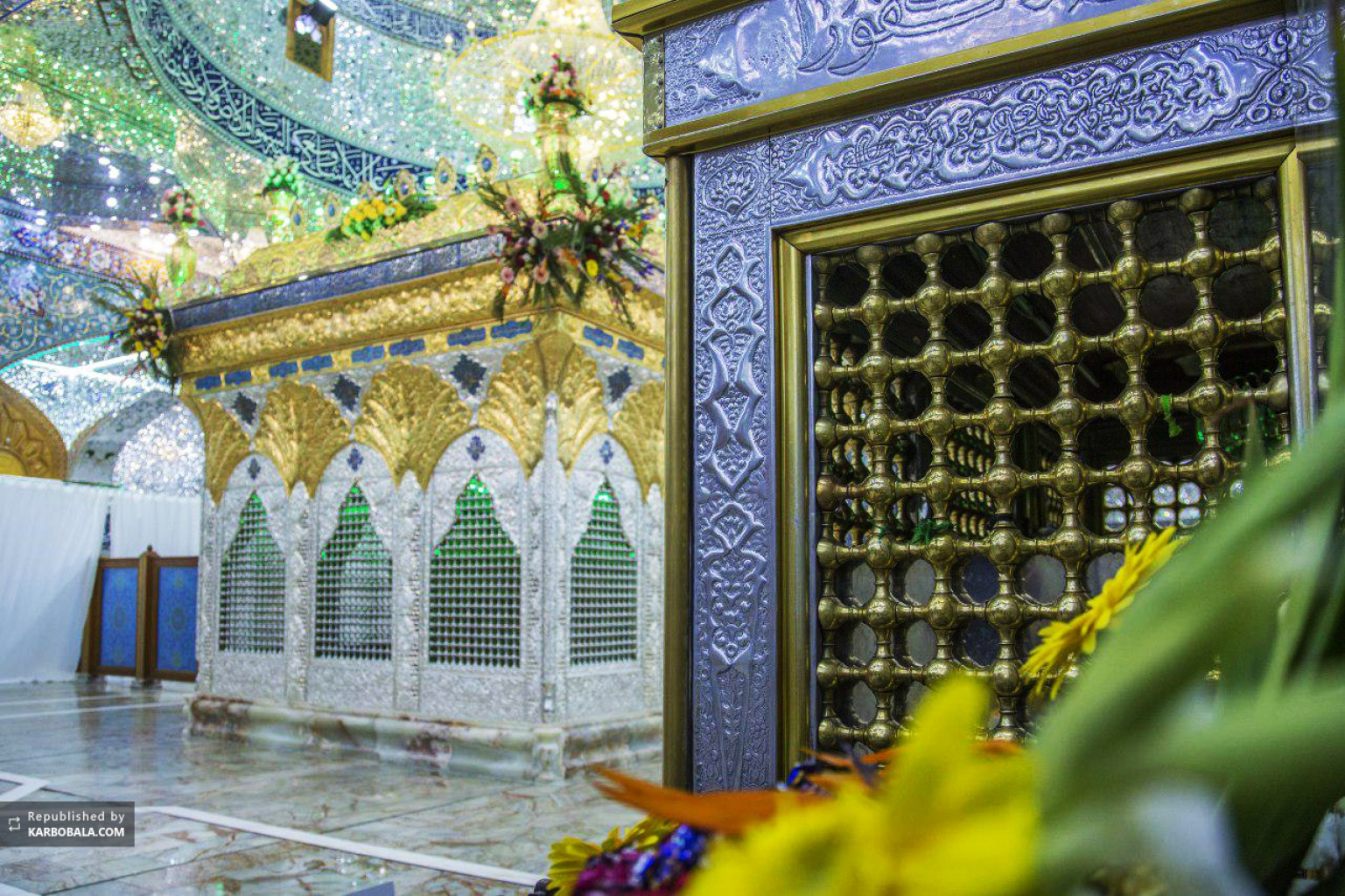
The tomb of Maytham al-Tammar in the shrine after 2017

Maytham al-Tammar was executed in the year 680 by Ubayd Allah ibn Ziyad. He was buried at this spot. The date of construction of the mausoleum over his grave is not known. However, a structure already existed there in the twentieth century.

In 2011, the mausoleum was rebuilt and expanded. Subsequently, the structure was converted into a Shi'ite mosque. Two minarets were added, and the dome over the shrine was replaced with a larger one which had more decorations on it. Then in 2017, a new zarih was built around the grave of Maytham al-Tammar. It was constructed from Isfahan and then shipped to Kufa, where it was reassembled around the grave.

== Architecture ==
The present mosque and mausoleum/shrine complex has one dome and two minarets. The dome has a diameter of 9 metres, while the minarets have a length of 28 metres and a diameter of 2.5 metres. The tomb of Maytham al-Tammar is located underneath the dome, and a zarih encloses it. This zarih was built in Isfahan, and its area is 20 square metres. It is made from wood, and inlaid with copper and silver attachments.

== Incidents ==
In 2006, a suicide bomber detonated a car bomb near the shrine. The bomb was detonated in between two vans carrying Iranian pilgrims to the shrine. Twelve innocent civilians were killed and 37 more were injured as a result of the car bomb. Out of the 12 killed, 8 of them were Iranians, and out of the 37 that were injured, 22 of them were Iranian.

== See also ==
- List of mosques in Iraq
- Shia Islam in Iraq
- Al-Abbas Shrine
- Al-Askari Shrine
- Al-Hamra Mosque (Kufa)
- Great Mosque of Kufa
- Imam Ali Shrine
- Imam Dur Mausoleum
- Imam Qasim Shrine
- Imam Saad bin Aqil' Shrine
- Imam Sultan Saqi Shrine
- Al-Kazimiyya Mosque
- Mausoleum of Abdul-Qadir Gilani
- Mausoleum of Ahmad al-Rifa'i
- Mausoleum of Ahmad ibn Hanbal
- Mausoleum of Imam al-Hasan of Basra
- Mausoleum of Imam Awn Al-Din
- Mausoleum of Kumayl ibn Ziyad
- Mausoleum of Sayyid Ali al-Zaki
- Mausoleum of Talha ibn 'Ubayd Allah
- Mausoleum of Umar Suhrawardi
- Mausoleum of Yahya Abu al-Qasim
- Mosque of Salman al-Farsi
