= Mass graves in Iraq =

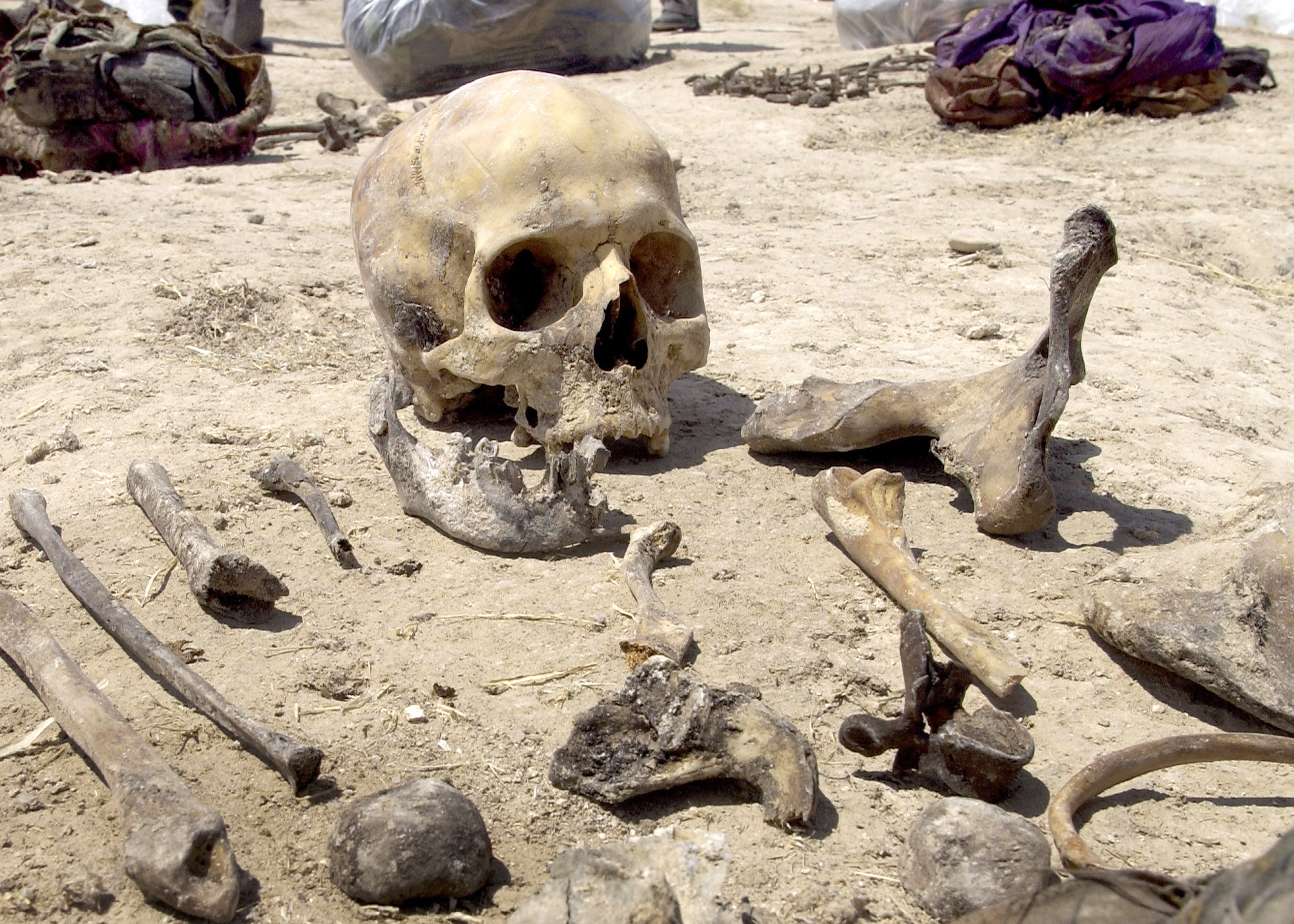
Human remains found in at a mass grave site in Iraqi Kurdistan, July 15, 2005

Mass graves in Iraq are characterized as unmarked sites containing at least six bodies. Some can be identified by mounds of earth piled above the ground or as deep pits that appear to have been filled. Some older graves are more difficult to identify, having been covered by vegetation and debris over time. Sites have been discovered in all regions of the country and contain members of every major religious and ethnic group in Iraq as well as foreign nationals, including Kuwaitis and Saudis.

== Background ==
Several entities and groups have deployed mass graves to cover up the Extrajudicial killing of civilians, enemy combatants, and rival factions in various civil conflicts. Under the rule of Saddam Hussein, mass graves were used to bury Iranian soldiers who were killed on Iraqi territory. It was also used during the same time period on Kurds in the north of Iraq during the Anfal Campaign. It was then widely used to bury civilians, protesters, defectors, and armed resistance groups that participated in the 1991 Iraqi uprisings

In the span of 21 years of searching, 3115 bodies from the 1991 Iraqi uprisings have been found in total and 605–755 bodies from the Anfal campaign have been found in total.

Mass graves continued to be used following the fall of the regime in 2003. They were used by various factions that committed mass murder during the Iraqi Civil War They were then used by ISIS as they massacred civilians during the time where they controlled Iraqi territory. It is estimated that 200 mass graves are in the city of Mosul alone due to the group's actions.

== List of Mass graves unearthed in Iraq ==
Following the fall of the Baath regime, efforts were made by both Iraqi authorities and international organizations to uncover mass graves in Iraq. Several US Senate committee investigations have been held to examine this topic.

List of Saddam-era Mass graves in Iraq
Remains Found	Location	Year found	Timeframe which grave was dug	Notes
113	Samawah	2005	1980–1988	Victims were Kurds; most of whom were women, children and teenagers
492	Al Diwaniyah	2011	1988	Victims were Kurds, likely part of the Anfal campaign
3,115	Al-Mahawil	2003	1991	A collection of three mass graves in the southern part of Iraq. This happened during the 1991 uprising where most of the victims were likely Shia'a Muslims.
150+	Samawah	2024	??	Victims were identified as women and children wearing Kurdish style clothing.

List of Post-Saddam Mass graves in Iraq
Remains Found	Location	Year found	Timeframe which grave was dug	Notes
22	Karbala	2008	2007	Victims were Shepherds who were reported missing in 2007
10	Al-Mahawil	2019	2014	The remains of ten people who were abducted and murdered in 2015. The identity of the victims has never been published.
12	Fallujah	2007	2006	Most of the victims have no IDs, but officials have said they were likely abducted and murdered by insurgents. One was a paramedic.

== Popular culture ==
The 2014 film The Blue Man, which is related to The New York Times article titled "Uncovering Iraq's Horrors in Desert Graves" written by John F. Burns, is about The Blue Man mass grave located in Al-Mahawil.

== See also ==
- Human rights in post-invasion Iraq
- Human rights in Saddam Hussein's Iraq
- Human rights in ISIL-controlled territory
