= Al Midhatiya =

Al Midhatiya المدحتية
- Location within Iraq
- Coordinates: 32°23′47″N 44°39′13″E
- Country: Iraq
- Governorate: Babil
- Municipality: Al-Hamza Gharbi District

Al Midhatiya (Arabic: المدحتية) or Al-Hamza Gharbi (الحمزة الغربي) is a city in Babil, Iraq. It is located 107 kilometres (66 mi) south of Baghdad.

== Background ==
Al Midhatiya is named after Midhat Pasha who rebuilt the city, it is also known as "Al-Hamza Gharbi" which hosts the tomb of "Al-Hamza bin Al-Qasim", grandson of Abbas ibn Ali. Al-Hamza Gharbi District, about 498 square kilometres (192 sq mi), was part of Hashimiya District until 2014.
