= Imam Qasim Shrine =

Shi'ite holy place in Babylon Governorate

- مرقد الإمام القاسم
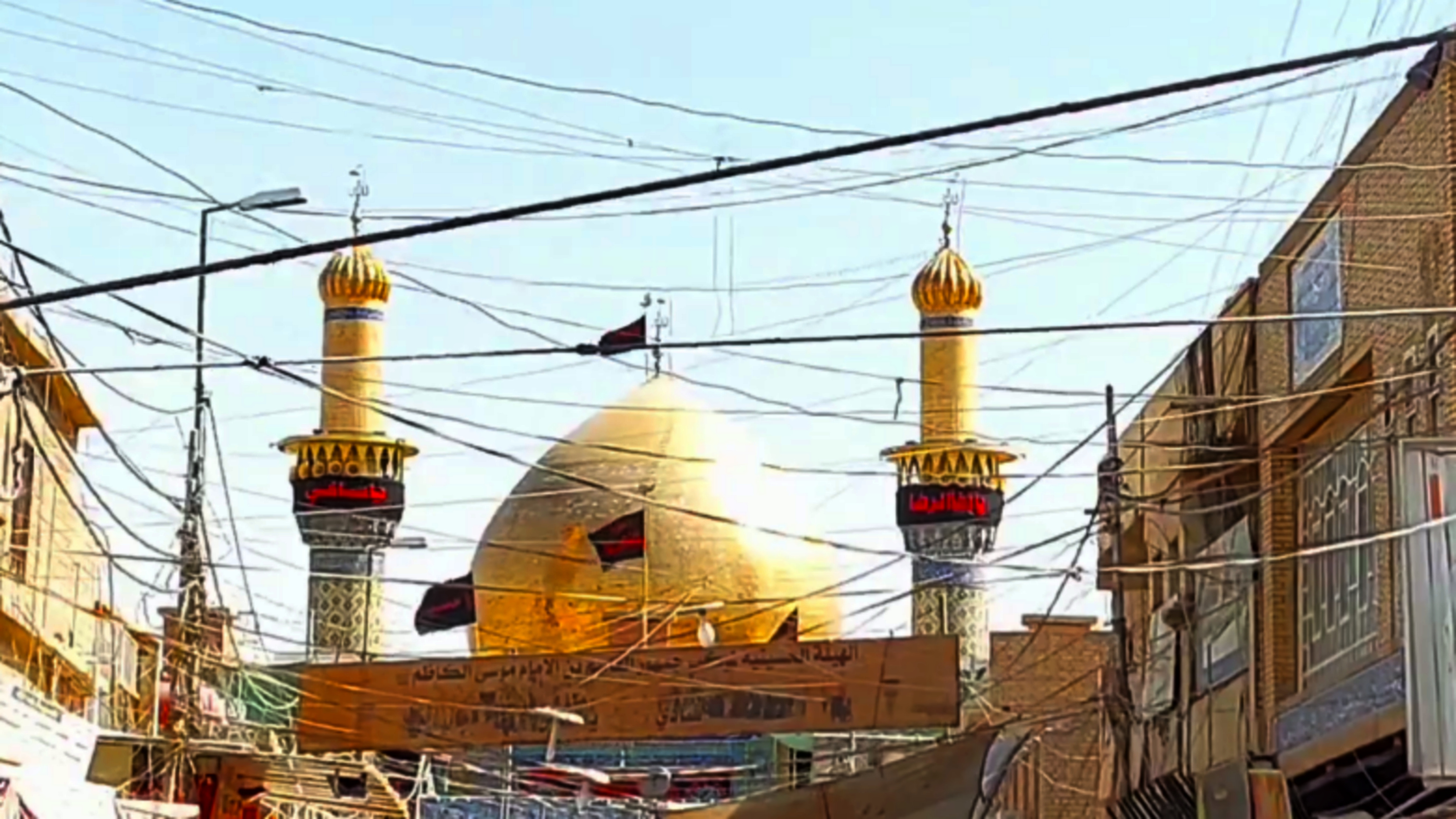
- The shrine in 2024

- Location of the shrine in Iraq

Religion
- Affiliation: Shia (Twelver)
- Ecclesiastical or organizational status: Shrine; Mosque; Mausoleum
- Ownership: Shiite Endowment Office
- Status: Active

Location
- Location: Al-Qasim, Babylon Governorate
- Country: Iraq
- Interactive map of Imam Qasim Shrine
- Coordinates: 32°17′51″N 44°41′04″E

Architecture
- Type: Mosque
- Style: Islamic architecture (Buyid, Ilkhanid, Safavid)
- Completed: 10th century CE

Specifications
- Dome: One
- Minaret: Two
- Shrine: One: al-Qasim

The Imam Qasim Shrine (Arabic: مرقد الإمام القاسم), also known as the Shrine of al-Qasim, is a Twelver Shi'ite mosque and shrine, located in the city of Al-Qasim, in the Babylon Governorate of Iraq. The structure contained the mausoleum of al-Qasim, one of the sons of Musa al-Kadhim, the seventh Imam of the Twelver Shi'ite religion.

== Significance ==
The mosque and shrine complex is the burial place of al-Qasim ibn Musa al-Kadhim, who is buried in the room topped by the golden dome. He was very deeply beloved to his father, Musa al-Kadhim who included his son in his will and testament. Musa al-Kadhim is known to have said, regarding the affairs of his son:

If the matter were up to me, I would have made it [the will] to my son al-Qasim, because of my love for him and my compassion for him. But that is up to Allah Ta'ala, for He makes it where He wills.

al-Qasim is believed to have been born in 767 CE and died between 807 and 808 CE with an estimated age of 40–41 years at death. The Shi'ite scholar Ibn Tawus emphasized the importance of visiting the grave of al-Qasim, saying:

If you want to visit one of them, such as al-Qasim ibn [Musa] al-Kadhim, al-Abbas ibn Ali, or Ali ibn al-Husayn, who was killed in al-Taif, and whoever is similar to them, you will stand at the One whom you want to visit.

== History ==
The original mausoleum was established by the Buyids in the 10th-century, in years later on the Ilkhanate and the Jalayirid Sultanate would renovate and expand the structure between the 14th to 15th centuries. The current mausoleum dates from the reign of the Safavid Empire when Shah Ismail ordered the placement of a wooden cenotaph over the grave of al-Qasim in 1871. The present day mosque and outer structure, however, date from the 20th century; a large number of repairs were done to the shrine in 1907; in 1950 the glided dome was implemented; between 1951 and 1952 the courtyard was built. Construction was finalized between 1996 and 1997 with the efforts of the local population.

== See also ==
- Shia Islam in Iraq
- List of mosques in Iraq
