= Al Hashimiyah, Iraq =

Al Hashimiyah الهاشمية
- Location within Iraq
- Coordinates: 32°21′59″N 44°39′29″E
- Country: Iraq
- Governorate: Babil
- Municipality: Hashimiya District

Population (2018)
  - Total: 37,300

Al Hashimiyah (Arabic: الهاشمية) is a town in Babil Governorate, Iraq. It is located 130 kilometres (81 mi) south of Baghdad.

== Background ==
Al Hashimiyah is named after Hashemites who inhabited the region. The region is about 620 square kilometres (240 sq mi).

== Climate ==
Al Hashimiyah has a hot desert climate (Köppen climate classification BWh). Most rain falls in the winter. The average annual temperature in Al Hashimiyah is 23.1 °C (73.6 °F). About 117 mm (4.61 in) of precipitation falls annually.

Climate data for Al Hashimiyah
Month	Jan	Feb	Mar	Apr	May	Jun	Jul	Aug	Sep	Oct	Nov	Dec	Year
Mean daily maximum °C (°F)	16.6 (61.9)	19.5 (67.1)	24.0 (75.2)	29.5 (85.1)	35.4 (95.7)	41.3 (106.3)	43.3 (109.9)	43.3 (109.9)	40.1 (104.2)	33.8 (92.8)	25.1 (77.2)	18.3 (64.9)	30.9 (87.5)
Mean daily minimum °C (°F)	4.3 (39.7)	6.3 (43.3)	9.9 (49.8)	14.8 (58.6)	20.3 (68.5)	23.9 (75.0)	25.6 (78.1)	24.8 (76.6)	21.5 (70.7)	16.6 (61.9)	10.8 (51.4)	5.8 (42.4)	15.4 (59.7)
Average precipitation mm (inches)	25 (1.0)	18 (0.7)	14 (0.6)	17 (0.7)	6 (0.2)	0 (0)	0 (0)	0 (0)	0 (0)	2 (0.1)	13 (0.5)	22 (0.9)	117 (4.6)
Source: Climate-Data.org
