= Iranian intervention in Iraq (2014–present) =

- Part of the War against the Islamic State, the War in Iraq (2013–2017), the aftermath of the Iranian involvement in the Iraq War (2003-2011 phase), the Iraqi insurgency (2017–present), the Middle Eastern crisis (2023–present) and the 2026 Iran war
- Territorial control (as of January 23, 2024) Controlled by the Iraqi Government Controlled by ISIS Controlled by Peshmerga (Kurdistan Regional Government) and other Kurdish forces from the Kurdistan Region Controlled by the Turkish Armed Forces
Date	13 June 2014 – present (12 years, 5 months and 5 days)
Location	Iraq
Status	Ongoing: Iranian airstrikes on ISIL positions in Iraq; Armed clashes between Iran-backed militias and ISIL troops; Territorial defeat of ISIL and the end of the War in Iraq; Continued Iranian intervention in Iraq from 2017; Protests against the Iranian intervention in 2019

Belligerents
Iran Hezbollah; Iraq; Iraqi Kurdistan; Popular Mobilization Forces: Badr Organization; Muqawimun; Peace Brigades; Kata'ib al-Imam Ali; Islamic Resistance: Asa'ib Ahl al-Haq; Kata'ib Hezbollah; Kata'ib Sayyid al-Shuhada; Sunni tribal militias: Jubur Confederation; Anbar Salvation Council; Christian militias: Kataib Rouh Allah Issa Ibn Miriam	Islamic State Naqshbandi Army

Commanders and leaders
(Iran) Mojtaba Khamenei (WIA) (since 2026); (Iran) Ali Khamenei X (until 2026); (Iran) Masoud Pezeshkian (WIA) (since 2024); (Iran) Ebrahim Raisi # (until 2024); (Iran) Hassan Rouhani (until 2021); (Iran) Esmail Qaani; (Iran) Qassem Soleimani X (until 2020); Hassan Nasrallah X (until 2024); Naim Qassem (since 2024); (Iraq) Abdul Latif Rashid; (Iraq) Muhammad Shayya al-Sudani; (Iraq) Mustafa al-Kadhimi (2020–2022); (Iraq) Adil Abdul-Mahdi (2018–2020); (Iraq) Nouri al-Maliki (2014–2015); (Kurdistan Region) Nechirvan Barzani; Qais al-Khazali; Hadi al-Amiri	(Islamic State) Abu Hafs al-Hashimi al-Qurashi (since 2023); (Islamic State) Abu al-Hussein al-Husseini al-Qurashi † (2022 - 2023); (Islamic State) Abu al-Hasan al-Hashimi al-Qurashi † (2022); (Islamic State) Abu Ibrahim al-Hashimi al-Qurashi † (2019–2022); (Islamic State) Abu Bakr al-Baghdadi X (2014–2019); (Islamic State) Abu Ala al-Afri †; (Islamic State) Abu Mohammad al-Adnani †; Izzat Ibrahim ad-Douri # Salah Al-Mukhtar

Units involved
Iranian Armed Forces: Quds Force; IRIAF; Special forces of Iran (since 2016); (Iraq) Iraqi Armed Forces: Iraqi Army; Iraqi Air Force; Iraqi Federal Police; Kurdistan Regional Government: Peshmerga	Military of ISIL

Strength
Iran: 1,500 Basijis; 7 Sukhoi Su-25s; 47 F-4 Phantom IIs; Mohajer-4, Ababil and Shahed 129 drones	Around 100,000 fighters (according to Kurdish Chief of Staff.); At least a few hundred tanks 3 drones

Casualties and losses
Iran: 42 killed; 1 Mohajer-4 drone captured; Hezbollah: 1 commander killed	Unknown

The Iranian intervention in Iraq has its roots in the 2003 invasion of Iraq by the United States and its allies, when the infrastructure of the Iraqi armed forces, as well as intelligence, were disbanded in a process called "de-Ba'athification" which allowed militias with close ties to Tehran to join the newly reconstituted army.

The intervention reached its peak following the advance of the Islamic State into northern Iraq in mid-2014. Iran began to provide military aid to counter the militant advance. Iran provided technical advisers to the Iraqi government and weapons to the Kurdish Peshmerga. Several sources, among them Reuters, believe that since mid-June 2014, Iranian combat troops are in Iraq, which Iran denies.

The Iraqi Shia militias Kata'ib Hezbollah ("Hezbollah Brigades") and Asa'ib Ahl al-Haq ("League of the Righteous"), funded and trained by Iran, fought alongside the Iraqi Army and Peshmerga in retaking territory from ISIL.

== Background ==
=== US invasion of Iraq ===
After the 2003 invasion of Iraq by the United States and its allies, The Coalition Provisional Authority disbanded the Iraqi military, security, and intelligence infrastructure of President Saddam Hussein and began a process of "de-Ba'athification". This move became an object of controversy, cited by some critics as the biggest American mistake made in the immediate aftermath of the fall of Saddam Hussein and as one of the main causes of the rise of the Islamic State.

The Badr organisation, which fought alongside Iran in the Iran-Iraq war, was seen as a U.S. asset in the fight against Ba'athist partisans because of their opposition to Saddam Hussein. Shortly after the fall of Baghdad, Badr forces and other militias with close ties to Tehran reportedly joined the newly reconstituted army, police, and Interior Ministry in significant numbers. The Interior Ministry was controlled by SCIRI, and many Badr members became part of the Interior Ministry-run Wolf Brigade. The Iraqi Interior Minister, Bayan Jabr, was a former leader of the Badr Brigade militia.

The Islamic Supreme Council of Iraq and various other parties with military wings, all with close ties with Tehran, had pioneering role in forming the governments with close ties to Tehran.

According to the U.S. military and U.S. State Department, the Iraqi Shia militia Kata'ib Hezbollah ("Hezbollah Brigades"), which has existed since 2003, has received funding, training, logistics, guidance, and material support from the Iranian Islamic Revolutionary Guard Corps's Quds Force. Iran denies these claims.

Asa'ib Ahl al-Haq ("League of the Righteous"), another Iraqi Shia militia, formed in 2006, was assumed by Iraqi officials to have been receiving $2 million a month from Iran even before 2014, and assumed by The Guardian to be under the patronage of Qasem Soleimani.

=== Opposing the intervention ===
In 2019, protests broke out in Iraq demanding the end of corruption, nepotism, unemployment, and political sectarianism while also calling for an end to Iranian intervention in Iraqi affairs. The Abdul-Mehdi government, backed by Iranian-backed militias used live bullets, marksmen, hot water, hot pepper gas, and tear gas against protesters, leading to many deaths and injuries.

The protests resulted in the resignation of Prime Minister Abdul-Mahdi and his government, and the appointment of Mustafa Al-Kadhimi. A new election law was also passed by the Council of Representatives.

The 2021 parliamentary election resulted in Pro-Iran parties losing seats in the newly elected Iraqi parliament and in turn led to 2021 Baghdad clashes.

In November 2021, Al-Kadhimi survived an assassination attempt via an explosive drone, two drones were shot down by the army while the last one targeted his residence in the heavily fortified Green Zone district of Baghdad.

According to experts, the assassination attempt came as a response to pro-Iran parties losing seats in the 2021 Iraqi parliamentary election.

== Intervention ==
Map showing Iran and Iraq.

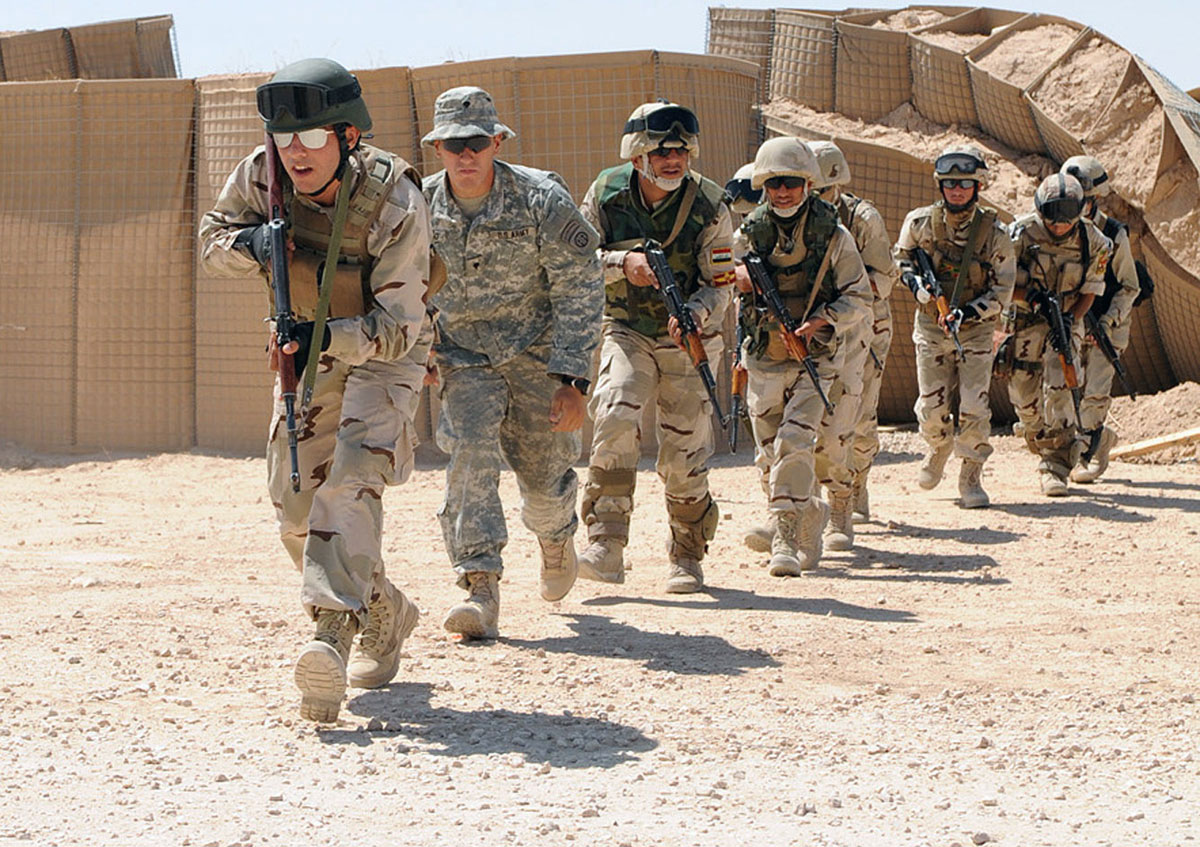
Iraqi commandos training under the supervision of soldiers of the US 82nd Airborne, 2011.

=== Strategy and tactics ===
Tehran's strategic objectives in its intervention in Iraq include keeping the Shia-led government in power and stabilising its border.

Iran has attempted to limit its overt military involvement in Iraq as a strategy geared toward avoiding the polarisation of Iraq's Sunni minority, creating a popular backlash against Iran among Iraqis, or deepening sectarian tensions. The IRGC also attempted to create a more diversified model in Iraq, and began interacting more with Iraqi Turkmen and Feyli Kurds. Most Iranian aid has thus far come in the form of technical assistance, the commitment of special forces troops, and air support. Iranian Brigadier-General Massoud Jazayeri stated that Iran could best help Iraq by providing it with direction on its "successful experiments in popular all-around defence" that included "mobilising masses of all ethnic groups." Iran believes cooperation and unity among Iraq's fractious militias are essential in its battle against ISIL. Ali Khamenei, in remarks delivered on 15 September 2014, credited "the people of Iraq, the Iraqi Armed Forces, and the popular forces" for halting the ISIL advance of the previous summer.

The Washington Post reported that Iran has sent more than 1,000 military advisers to Iraq, and spent more than $1 billion on military aid.

=== Timeline ===
==== June 2014 ====
In the week of 14 June, according to The Guardian, Iran's Quds Force commander Qasem Soleimani was in Baghdad to organise an Iraqi counterattack against ISIL. Press agency Reuters believes that since mid-June, Iran has had members of its Islamic Revolutionary Guard Corps (IRGC) fighting on the ground in Iraq against ISIL, though it does not give an estimate of their numbers.

According to Iranian social media, ISIL troops on 19 June attacked two Iranian border guards near Iran's border city of Qasr Shirin, but this has not been confirmed by authoritative sources.

American war correspondent David Axe, on his website 'War is Boring', asserted that on 21 June 2014, "it appears Iran joined the air war" of Iraq and Syria against ISIL.

By the end of June, according to American officials, Iran had established a control center at Al-Rasheed Air Base in Baghdad and was flying a small fleet of Ababil drones over Iraq, and an Iranian signals intelligence unit had been deployed at the airfield to intercept electronic communications between ISIL fighters and commanders.

==== July 2014 ====
On 1 July, according to IISS, several Su-25 aircraft were sent by Iran to al-Rashid and, later, to the al-Muthanna air base. The aircraft were supported by bi-national Iranian/Iraqi ground crews who had been trained in Iran. (During the 1991 Gulf War, seven Su-25s had been flown by the Iraqi air force to Iran as a temporary safe haven, and Iran had kept them since; ironically, some of them may now have returned to Iraq.)

On 5 July, Quds Force pilot Shojaat Alamdari was killed in Samarra, probably working there as a forward air controller.

==== August 2014 ====
Iraqi Kurdish President Barzani and Iranian foreign minister Zarif said, at the end of August 2014, that Iran had been the first country to provide weapons and ammunition (at an unspecified date) to the Iraqi Kurdish forces (Peshmerga). Zarif said that Iran cooperated militarily with the Iraqi central government and the Kurds, but that it had "no military presence in Iraq".
In contradiction to that Iranian denial, Business Insider, without naming its sources, contends that in early August, Iran's IRGC sent Quds Force personnel, attack aircraft, and drones to Iraq and that since early August Iran was operating its Su-25 aircraft (see July 2014) in combat against ISIL.

But in early August, Qasem Soleimani, chief of the Iranian Quds Force, was indeed in Erbil advising Kurdish forces, an Iranian official admitted in early October 2014.

On 21–22 August, according to Kurdish sources, hundreds of Iranian soldiers, allegedly from Iran's 81st Armored Division, helped Peshmerga to take back Jalawla in Diyala Governorate from ISIL. Iran subsequently denied any military presence in Iraq.

There were unconfirmed reports of clashes between ISIL forces and Islamic Revolutionary Guard Corps units near Urmia on 28 August.

Between 31 August and 1 September, the Iranian-backed Iraqi Shia militias Asa'ib Ahl al-Haq and Kata'ib Hezbollah (see section Background) joined an Iraqi army and Kurdish Peshmerga assault to break the ISIL siege of Amerli in Saladin Governorate. The attack was supported by the U.S. Air Force at the request of the Iraqi army, according to a statement by the U.S. Central Command.

==== September 2014 ====
By early September, according to Business Insider, Iranian Quds Force personnel were deployed to Samarra, Baghdad, Karbala, and the former U.S. military post known as Camp Speicher.

In late September, Iranian general Ahmad Reza Pourdastan threatened to "attack deep into Iraqi territory" should ISIL forces approach the Iranian border. Earlier in the month, the Iranian government announced it had arrested Afghan and Pakistani nationals attempting to "cross Iran" to join ISIL.

There have been sporadic reports of ISIL troops in Iranian Kurdistan. These claims are unverified.

==== October 2014 ====
Iranian general Qasem Soleimani, chief of the Iranian Quds Force, was reportedly present on the battlefield during Operation Ashura. In early October, the Islamic Republic of Iran News Network (IRINN) published a picture of Soleimani, purportedly on some battlefield alongside Kurdish Peshmerga. The Operation Ashura included Shi'ite paramilitary groups such as Asa'ib Ahl al-Haq, Kata'ib Hezbollah and the Badr brigades along with their leader Hadi Al-Amiri. Hezbollah was also present to provide technical advice and combat support for the allied offensive against the town of Jurf al-Sakhr.

==== November 2014 ====
On 14 November, it was reported that the army had taken full control of Baiji, forcing ISIL forces to withdraw, and on 18 November, the anti-terrorism force Mosul Battalion entered the refinery for the first time since June. However, this could not be confirmed independently. If confirmed, it would be a major victory for Iraqi forces. State television said that they had entered the gates of the refinery. Meanwhile, it was confirmed that Iraqi forces were in full control of Baiji. Iraqi state television said Baiji's recapture was a "Graveyard for ISIS". Later, the US Department of State congratulated the Iraqi forces for retaking the country's largest oil refinery, confirming the Iraqi victory.

At the end of November, according to the Israeli website Haaretz, Al Jazeera broadcast a video showing Iranian F-4 Phantom jet-fighters bombing ISIL targets in northeastern Iraq, though Al Jazeera, in its report, alleged they were "Iraqi jet-fighters". US rear Admiral John Kirby affirmed on 3 December that he had "indications that [Iran] did indeed fly air strikes with F-4 Phantoms" targeting ISIL positions in the eastern Iraqi province of Diyala.

==== December 2014 ====
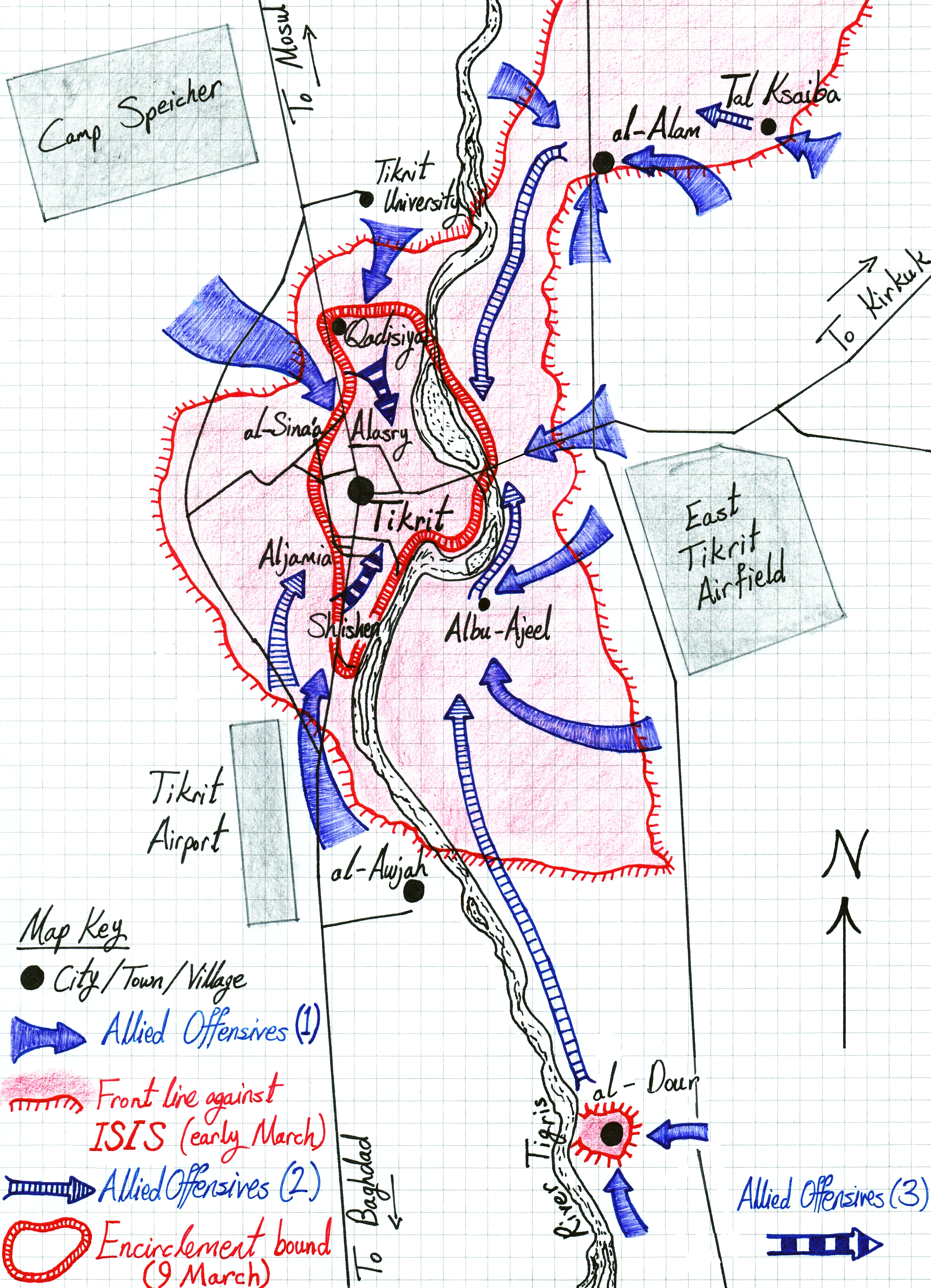
Military situation in the Second Battle of Tikrit (March–April 2015) as in early-mid March 2015.

On 27 December, Iranian IRGC Brigadier General Hamid Taqavi was killed in Samarra, Iraq, reportedly by an ISIL sniper. He is the highest ranking Iranian military official to die in Iraq since Iran's military intervention began, other than Qasem Soleimani.

==== March–April 2015 ====
On 2 March 2015, Iraqi forces and allied Shia militias launched an offensive to recapture Tikrit from ISIL. Qasem Soleimani, commander of Iran's Quds Force, was reported to be overseeing part of the operation. Iran supplied artillery and other weapons, while Iranian military advisers helped coordinate the offensive.

After the offensive stalled, the US-led coalition began airstrikes on 25 March at the Iraqi government's request. Kata'ib Hezbollah and Asa'ib Ahl al-Haq suspended their participation in protest, while the Badr Organization said it would continue fighting. The Iraqi government announced Tikrit's recapture on 31 March.

Jim Phillips of the American The Heritage Foundation in March described Suleimani's role in this war as: "he's Iran's viceroy for Iraq".

==== May 2015 ====
Following ISIL's capture of Ramadi in May, the Iraqi government allowed Iranian-backed Shia militias to rejoin the fighting in the area. According to Iranian state media, IRGC commander Jassem Nouri was killed near Ramadi on 28 May while advising Iraqi forces.

==== September–October 2015 ====
Iran, Iraq, Russia and Syria agreed in September to share intelligence on ISIL through a joint coordination center in Baghdad. On 16 October, Iraqi forces and allied Shia militias, including the Iranian-backed Badr Organization and Asa'ib Ahl al-Haq, recaptured the Baiji oil refinery from ISIL. Badr spokesman Karim al-Nuri and an Asa'ib Ahl al-Haq official told Reuters that an Iranian member of the Baghdad intelligence-sharing cell had assisted in the operation.

==== May 2016 ====
Iran deployed military advisers, including Quds Force commander Qasem Soleimani, to assist the offensive to recapture Fallujah from ISIL. Iranian-backed Shia militias fought around the city, while Iraqi counterterrorism forces were assigned to lead the assault on Fallujah itself. Three Sunni lawmakers from Anbar criticized Soleimani's involvement, warning that it could fuel sectarian tensions. Iran's foreign ministry said its military advisers were operating at the Iraqi government's request.

==== October 2016 ====
Iranian-backed Shia militias within the Popular Mobilization Forces opened a front west of Mosul on 29 October, advancing toward Tal Afar to cut ISIL's supply lines from Syria. Jaafar al-Husseini, a spokesman for Kata'ib Hezbollah, said Iranian advisers and Iraqi aircraft supported the advance. PMF leaders said their forces would concentrate on Tal Afar and would not enter Mosul itself.

==== November 2016 ====
The Iraqi parliament passed legislation on 26 November recognizing the Popular Mobilization Forces as an independent military formation within the Iraqi Armed Forces, reporting directly to the prime minister as commander-in-chief.

==== May 2017 ====
On 27 May, senior IRGC commander Shaaban Nassiri had been killed fighting ISIL west of Mosul. Two days later, the PMF announced that its forces had reached the Syrian border north of Al-Ba'aj, following advances through villages west of Mosul. Iran prioritized control of strategic roads, while the militias' territorial gains would give them political and military leverage after ISIL's defeat.

== Casualties ==
=== Iran ===
In late June 2014, three Iranian border guards were killed along the border in western Kermanshah province by an alleged "terrorist group", however it is unclear if the assailants were members of PJAK or ISIL.

There are at least 13 confirmed Iranians killed in Iraq:

Name	Rank/Affiliation	Date	Place
Alireza Moshajari	Captain, Saberin Special Forces	14 June 2014	Disputed
Kamal Shirkhani	Colonel, Quds Force	Mid-June 2014	Samarra
Shoja'at Alamdari Mourjani	Colonel, Aerospace Force Fighter pilot	early July 2014	Samarra
Hamid Taqavi	Brigadier General, Quds Force	28 December 2014	Samarra
Mehdi Norouzi	Unknown, Basij	10 January 2015	Samarra
Hossein Shakeri	Unknown, alleged "War photographer"	23 January 2015	Samarra
Reza Hosseini-Moghadam	Unknown, alleged "IRGC Commander"	7 February 2015	Samarra
Mohammad-Hadi Zolfaghari	Unknown	mid February 2015	Samarra
Sadeq Yari Goldarreh	Unknown, alleged "Quds Force Commander"	20 March 2015	Tikrit
Ali Yazdani	Unknown, IRGC	23 March 2015	Tikrit
Hadi Jafari	Unknown, IRGC	23 March 2015	Tikrit
Kheirollah Ahmadi	Brigadier General, IRGC	4 February 2017	near Tal Afar
Ali-Asqar Karimi	Unknown, IRGC	25 February 2017	near Mosul
Shaaban Nassiri	General, IRGC	26 May 2017	between al-Qairawan and Al-Ba'aj

=== Hezbollah ===
In late July 2014, it was reported that Ibrahim al-Haj, a Hezbollah "technical specialist involved in training" was killed near Mosul.

== Political dimension ==
=== In Iraq ===
Iraq:

Iraqi Prime Minister Haider al-Abadi said, "We do respect this Iranian commander and our collaboration with him is not a secret", adding that Iran was quick in selling arms to Iraq and helping Baghdad when Islamic State captured large areas in the country.

Hadi al-Amiri, leader of the Badr Organization, said, "If it were not for the cooperation of the Islamic Republic of Iran and General Suleimani, we would not today have a government headed by Haider al-Abadi in Baghdad". During the Second Battle of Tikrit, Hadi al-Amiri said US has failed to live up to its promises to help Iraq fight ISIL, unlike the "unconditional" assistance being given by Iran.

On 31 December 2014, Defence Ministers of Iran and Iraq signed a military pact to combat ISIS.

"Iranians will try to calm the fears of the Sunnis instead of persecuting them because the Iranian officials know that it is in their best interest to keep Iraq united," said Hadi Jalo, a Baghdad-based political analyst. "For the Iranians, it is easier to dominate one country instead of three separate states."

In addition to the aforementioned involvement, Iran has been even more engaged in the fight against ISIL, by providing financial and military support to the predominantly Shiite militias of the Popular Mobilization Units. This group was able to gain a foothold in the country's political and economic life after the defeat of ISIL.

=== US reactions ===
United States – Following the introduction of Iranian troops into Iraq in June 2014, President Barack Obama said, "Iran can play a constructive role if it is helping to send the same message to the Iraqi government that we're sending."
In July, Secretary of Defence Chuck Hagel offered further explanation, "We are aware of the Iranian and Russian efforts to help the Iraqis, but we are not involved in coordinating any missions."

In September 2014, Secretary of State John Kerry said the US "does not have any intention" of cooperating with Iran. Nevertheless, later that month, Kerry met with Iranian foreign minister Mohammad Javad Zarif in New York City where the two discussed ISIL.

The US in December 2014 continued to deny cooperation with Iran with American Ambassador to Iraq Stuart E. Jones saying: "Let's face it, Iran is an important neighbour to Iraq. There has to be cooperation between Iran and Iraq. The Iranians are talking to the Iraqi security forces and we're talking to Iraqi security forces ... We're relying on them to do the deconfliction" in December 2014.

At the end of March 2015, the chairman of the joint chiefs of staff of the US Armed Forces, Gen. Martin Dempsey, stated that Iran's overt role in the Second Battle of Tikrit (March–April 2015) could be positive and could only become problematic if it descended into sectarianism.

=== Other international reactions to Iranian intervention ===
- Canada – Speaking at the United Nations, Canadian Foreign Affairs Minister John Baird said Iran was "involved in a negative way in every single country in the region" and stated that Canada considers Iran a state sponsor of terrorism.
- China – China has said it wants Iran to be part of an "anti-ISIS alliance."
- France – In September, French officials suggested inviting Iran to an international conference of nations involved in the American-led intervention in Iraq (2014–present), however, objections by Saudi Arabia and the United Arab Emirates prevented such an invitation from being extended.
- India – In what The Hindu declared was a likely reference to the exclusion of Iran and Syria from the American-led intervention in Iraq, Prime Minister Narendra Modi in September said that "everyone must be included in a global fight against the terror we see in west Asia."
- Italy – Italian foreign minister Federica Mogherini has said Iran can play a "positive role" in operations against ISIL and added that she hoped agreement could be reached by which Iran would join "the countries that are working to combat ISIL and support the Iraqi government."
- Israel – During an NBC television interview in June, Israeli prime minister, Benjamin Netanyahu, made known his concerns over American cooperation with Iran. He offered the following words of advice to President Barack Obama, "when your enemies are fighting one another, don't strengthen either one of them. Weaken both." Netanyahu also expressed his concern over Iran acquiring nuclear weapons, asserting it would be a tragic mistake that would make everything else pale in comparison.
- Ansar al-Sharia (Yemen) – Sheikh Nasser bin Ali al Ansi has connected the current Shia insurgency in Yemen to the conflict in Iraq, saying that "Iranian agents" are the common enemy across every theater of war in the Middle East.
- Russia – Russia has said it wants Iran to be part of an "anti-ISIS alliance."

=== Iran and Hezbollah's reaction to American-led intervention in Iraq ===
At the same time as the Iranian intervention in Iraq, a parallel American-led intervention was occurring. Neither nation is known to have cooperated with the other in combating ISIL. Iranian President Hassan Rouhani has dismissed U.S. involvement, noting that "Iran, from the very first moment, did not hesitate in fighting against terrorism. Other countries apparently had their doubts for quite some time ... they acted quite late in the game." Rouhani went on to question the level of American commitment, noting that the U.S. had not committed ground troops, as Iran had with, according to The Economist, Iranian officials boasting of being the ground force for America's air strikes.

On 29 September, in response to a statement by U.S. Secretary of State John Kerry that the United States wanted "to find out if they [Iran] will come on board" the American-led intervention, Ali Khamenei declared the U.S. position on ISIL as "absurd, hollow and biased." Nonetheless, Khamenei also noted that some Iranian government officials were "not against" cooperation with the United States, explaining that he had personally quashed the suggestion of joint action against ISIL. In follow-up remarks, the Iranian-affiliated Kata'ib Hezbollah declared it would "not fight alongside the American troops under any kind of conditions whatsoever," adding that its only contact with the United States military would be "if we fight each other."

At least one Hezbollah official has indicated the party will continue to operate independently, or in concert with Iraqi and Iranian forces, against ISIL and will not cooperate with the U.S.-led coalition concurrently operating against ISIL. Mohammad Raad dismissed the NATO-centred coalition as neither serious nor sufficient to counter ISIL and noted that Hezbollah had initiated military operations against the ISIL prior to United States involvement.

Despite the cool reception given by Iran and its allies to the United States intervention, some observers believe the U.S. coalition will eventually be forced into brokering an alliance with Tehran. Eyal Zisser of Tel Aviv University has explained that "the West is helpless and does not know what to do against the Islamic State" and that it will ultimately conclude it has no choice but to ally with Iran.

== See also ==
- Iranian involvement in the Syrian civil war
- Opération Chammal – French operation against ISIL
- Operation Okra – Australian operation against ISIL
- Operation Impact – Canadian operation against ISIL
- Operation Shader – UK operation against ISIL
- Operation Inherent Resolve – US operation against ISIL
