= Liberation of Jurf Al Sakhar =

2014 siege in Iraq

Liberation of Jurf Al-Sakhar
- Part of War in Iraq and the Iranian-led intervention in Iraq (2014–present)
- Map of the Babil Governorate, where Jurf Al Sakhar is located
Date	24–26 October 2014 (2 days)
Location	Jurf Al Sakhar, Babil Governorate, Iraq
Result	Iraqi victory
Territorial changes	The Babil Governorate is liberated from IS control

Belligerents
Iraq: Iraqi Security Forces; Shia militias; Iran Hezbollah	Islamic State

Commanders and leaders
Hadi al-Amiri (Iran) Maj. Gen. Qasem Soleimani (Iran) Brig. Gen. Hamid Taqavi	Unknown

Units involved
Iraqi Security Forces; Army; Air Force; Federal Police; Shia militias; Asa'ib Ahl al-Haq; Badr Brigades; Kata'ib Hezbollah; Kata'ib Jund al-Imam; Other unnamed groups; Islamic Revolutionary Guard Corps; Quds Force	Military of the Islamic State

Strength
Iraqi Army & Shiite militia: 7,000; Unknown number of others	Unknown

Casualties and losses
Unknown	498 killed 100+ IEDs defused

Liberation of Jurf Al Sakhar, codenamed Operation Ashura (Arabic: عملية عاشوراء), was a two-day military operation by Iraqi government forces and Iranian-backed PMU forces beginning on 24 October 2014, aimed at retaking the strategic city of Jurf Al Sakhar near Baghdad from IS. The operation was mainly aimed at preventing IS militants from reaching the holy cities of Karbala and Najaf, where IS threatened to carry out attacks against the millions of Shia visitors commemorating the Day of Ashura.

== Background ==
Jurf Al Sakhar is a strategic town 50 kilometres south of the Iraqi capital. It is part of a predominantly Sunni ribbon that runs just south of Baghdad.

In 2014 Jurf Al Sakhar was captured by the Islamic State terrorist organization.

The town lies on a road usually taken by millions of Shia Muslim pilgrims who will be heading in droves to the holy Shia city of Karbala in the Day of Ashura in the holy month of Muharram in order to commemorate the death of Muhammad's grandson, Imam Hussein—one of the most revered figures in Shiite Islam. The Islamic State, which considers Shias apostates, was expected to attempt to target the observances.

According to Iraqi security officials, Jurf Al Sakhar "presents a specific danger to Karbala" and clearing the area is a key priority ahead of Ashura.

Five car bombings in the holy city of Karbala in the week preceding the operation added to its urgency.

== Operation ==
On 24 October 2014 the operation was launched in the area by the Iraqi government forces and Iranian-backed Shia militias and volunteers caused the liberation of the city.

Badr Brigade commander Hadi al-Amiri claimed to have led the operation in tandem with the country's new interior minister, who is a member of his party. Unverified pictures circulated online showed Hadi al-Amiri with Qasem Soleimani, the commander of Iran's elite Quds Force, during the operation. An Iraqi security official and a militia fighter also claimed that Soleimani was present on the battlefield. There have been claims about presence of Iranian forces in the operation. According to a commander of the Shia militia group Kata'ib Hezbollah, there were no Iranian forces, "but if there was a presence of some individuals, it was all officially coordinated". A commander said that Suleimani planned the operation "three months ago".

According to Iraqi security officials, 498 IS militants were killed during the operation. 35 of whom were from Saudi Arabia, 30 from Chechnya, and 24 from Syria. 60 of them were snipers or gunman and 29 others were suicide bombers.

On 29 October the Babil Government decided to lock the whole of Jurf Al Sakhar down to the area's displaced people for 8 months, so that to remove the numerous IEDs and clear the houses from bombs that has been placed by IS. Some 100 explosive devices, left by insurgents as they retreated from Jurf al-Sakhar region, were defused and detonated by Iraqi forces.

Babylon Provincial Council announced that the name of Jurf al-Sakhar (جرف الصخر, meaning "rocky bank") was changed into Jurf al-Nasr (جرف النصر, meaning "victory bank").

== Reactions ==
- Iraq – Prime Minister Haider al-Abadi praised Iraq's "hero forces" for delivering a "fatal blow" against the Islamic State.
- Iran – Deputy Foreign Minister for Afro-Arab Affairs Hossein Amirabdollahian congratulated the "Iraqi government and nation on liberation of Jurf Al Sakhar region".

== In media ==
On 5 March 2015, Iranian TV channel IRIB 1 broadcast a documentary titled Jurf Al Sakhar (Persian: جرف الصخر), directed by Morteza Shaabani and filmed by Mostafa Seyfi during the Operation Ashura, depicting the Iranian-backed Shia militia fighting IS and liberating the Jurf Al Sakhar region.
