= Al-Qasim, Iraq =

Al-Qasim القاسم
- Location within Iraq
- Coordinates: 32°18′5″N 44°41′21″E
- Country: Iraq
- Governorate: Babil
- Municipality: Hashimiya District
- Elevation: 20 m (66 ft)

Population (2018)
  - Total: 81,500

Al-Qasim (Arabic: القاسم), formerly known as "Sura" in Aramaic, is a city in Babil Governorate, Iraq. It is located 115 kilometres (71 mi) south of Baghdad.

== Background ==
Al-Qasim is named after al-Qasim ibn Musa al-Kadhim, whose tomb in the Imam Qasim Shrine is located here. Al-Qasim subdistrict is about 528 square kilometres (204 sq mi).
