= Jurf Al Sakhar Bridge =

- Coordinates: 33°00′57″N 44°10′25″E

Location
- Interactive map of Jurf Al Sakhar Bridge

Stretching across the Euphrates in the tiny Iraqi village of Jurf Al Sakhar southwest of Baghdad, the 4-lane Jurf Al Sakhar Bridge was a primary target of Operation Phantom Fury in November 2004.

According to US Central Command, the bridge was a key pathway for insurgents crossing between Baghdad and Fallujah.
