= Qasrok, Iraq =

Town In Kurdistan, Iraq

Qasrok قەسرۆک, Qesrok, قصروك
- Town
- Interactive map of Qasrok
- Location in Iraq
- Coordinates: 36°41′44″N 43°36′5″E
- Country: Iraq
- Region: Kurdistan Region
- Governorate: Nineveh Governorate
- District: Shekhan District
- Majority Kurdish, with an Assyrian minority
- Demonym: Qasroki
- Time zone: UTC+3 (Arabian Standard Time)
- Area code: +964

Qasrok (Kurdish: قەسرۆک, Qesrok, Arabic: قصروك) is a town located in the Shekhan District of the Nineveh Governorate of northern Iraq. Qasrok's residents are mostly Kurds with a small Assyrian minority.

The town and the surrounding villages were demolished and later settled by Arabs during the late 1960s. Most of the Arabs, however, returned to their original settlements after the 2003 US invasion.

== History ==
A number of the town's village's, such as Badariyah, Bajilla, Malla-Birwan, and Kifre, were Yazidi villages settled by Assyrians from the Tkhuma tribe and were destroyed during the Simele massacre.
