= Jurf al-Sakhar =

Subdistrict in Babylon, Iraq

Jurf al-Sakhar جرف الصخر
- Subdistrict
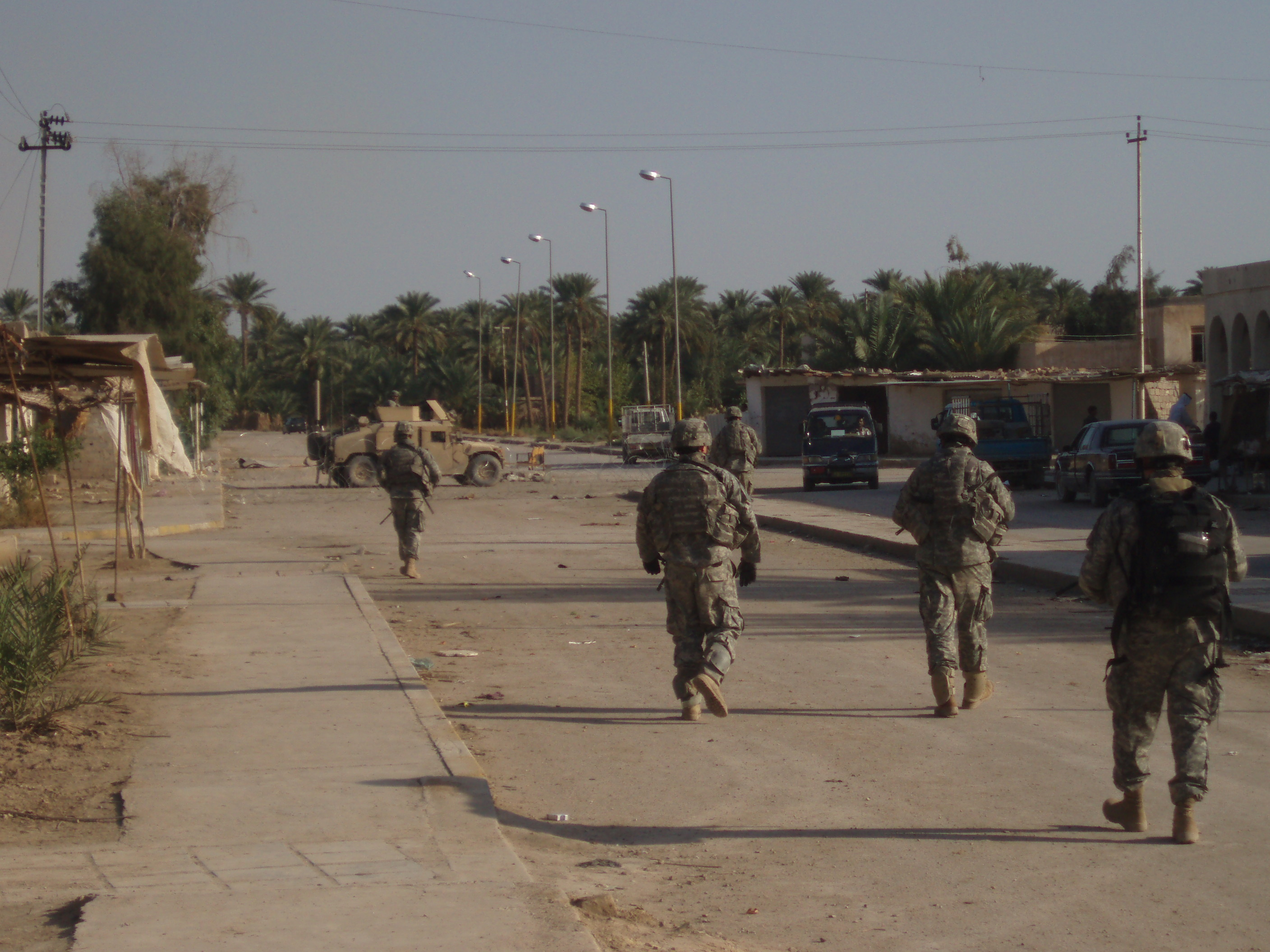
- Apache Company 1/501 PIR patrolling in Jurf al-Sakhar in November 2006
- Etymology: Arabic for "rocky bank"
- Map of Jurf al-Sakhar
- Interactive map of Jurf al-Sakhar
- Location in Iraq
- Coordinates: 32°52′00″N 44°12′50″E
- Iraq: Iraq
- Governorate: Babil Governorate
- District: Al-Musayab District
- Control: Iraqi Ground Forces
- Founded: 1925
- Administrative center: Jurf al-Sakhar

Government
  - Type: Subdistrict administration
  - Body: Babil Governorate Council
  - Subdistrict Director: Hassan Sabah al-Ardawi

Area
  - Total: 650 km^{2} (250 sq mi)

Dimensions
  - Length: 50 km (31 mi)
  - Width: 12 km (7.5 mi)
- Elevation: 37–47 m (121–154 ft)

Population (2015)
  - Total: 140,000
  - Density: 220/km^{2} (560/sq mi)
- According to estimates by the Iraqi Ministry of Migration and Displacement
- Time zone: UTC+3 (AST)
- ISO 3166 code: IQ-BB

Jurf al-Sakhar (Arabic: جرف الصخر) is a small town in Iraq, located about 60 kilometers south of Baghdad. It is near Musayyib and approximately 80 kilometers southeast of Fallujah. At the start of 2014, Jurf al-Sakhar had about 89,000 residents, mostly Sunni Muslims from the al-Janabi tribe. The former residents are now largely refugees in Fallujah, Yusofiyya, Al Musayyib, and the current population is about 15,000.

== History ==
In the 1990s, Jurf al-Sakhar housed a large military complex, including the Al Hakum facility, at one time Iraq's most sophisticated and largest biological weapons production factory.

During the Iraq War troop surge of 2007, Jurf al-Sakhar was one of the first towns under the "concerned citizens" program, in which the local populace was paid to secure the town via checkpoints along its roads, funded by money supplied by the U.S. military. The influx of money led to an almost instantaneous decrease in violence in the area. It was also the location of some of the most bitter fighting during Operation Iraqi Freedom. Nine medals for valor were awarded to the paratroopers of Apache Company, 1st Battalion, 501st Parachute Infantry Regiment (Geronimo), for their actions in and around the town. The unit was also awarded the Valorous Unit Award, the second highest unit award in the U.S. Army.

== ISIS control, liberation, and expulsion of Sunnis ==
In 2014, Jurf al-Sakhar was captured by ISIS.

On 24 October 2014, Operation Ashura was launched in the area by Iraqi government forces, the Popular Mobilization Forces, and volunteers aided by coalition airstrikes, liberating much of the city. Recapture of the town was additionally motived by the need to secure it prior to the Ashura religious observance, and the close proximity of a Shia shrine at Karbala.

On October 29, 2014, the Babil Government decided to lock out all of the former inhabitants of Jurf al-Sakhar for eight months in order to remove many improvised explosive devices and clear the houses of bombs that had been placed by ISIS. Local Sunni leaders alleged that various parts of Iraq said to be liberated were under the de facto control of the PMF and that thousands of Sunni homes were razed, with families who fled being barred from returning.

The Babylon Provincial Council announced that the name of Jurf al-Sakhar, meaning "rocky bank", was changed to Jurf al-Nasr, meaning "victory bank", after the triumph over ISIS in the area. Many of the Iraqi forces who had taken part in the recapture from ISIS were also participants in Shia Muslim rituals to commemorate the martyrdom of Imam Hussein, a few days later.

== See also ==
- Jurf Al Sakhar Bridge
