= Saddat al Hindiyah =

Town in Iraq

Coordinates: 32°43′N 44°17′E

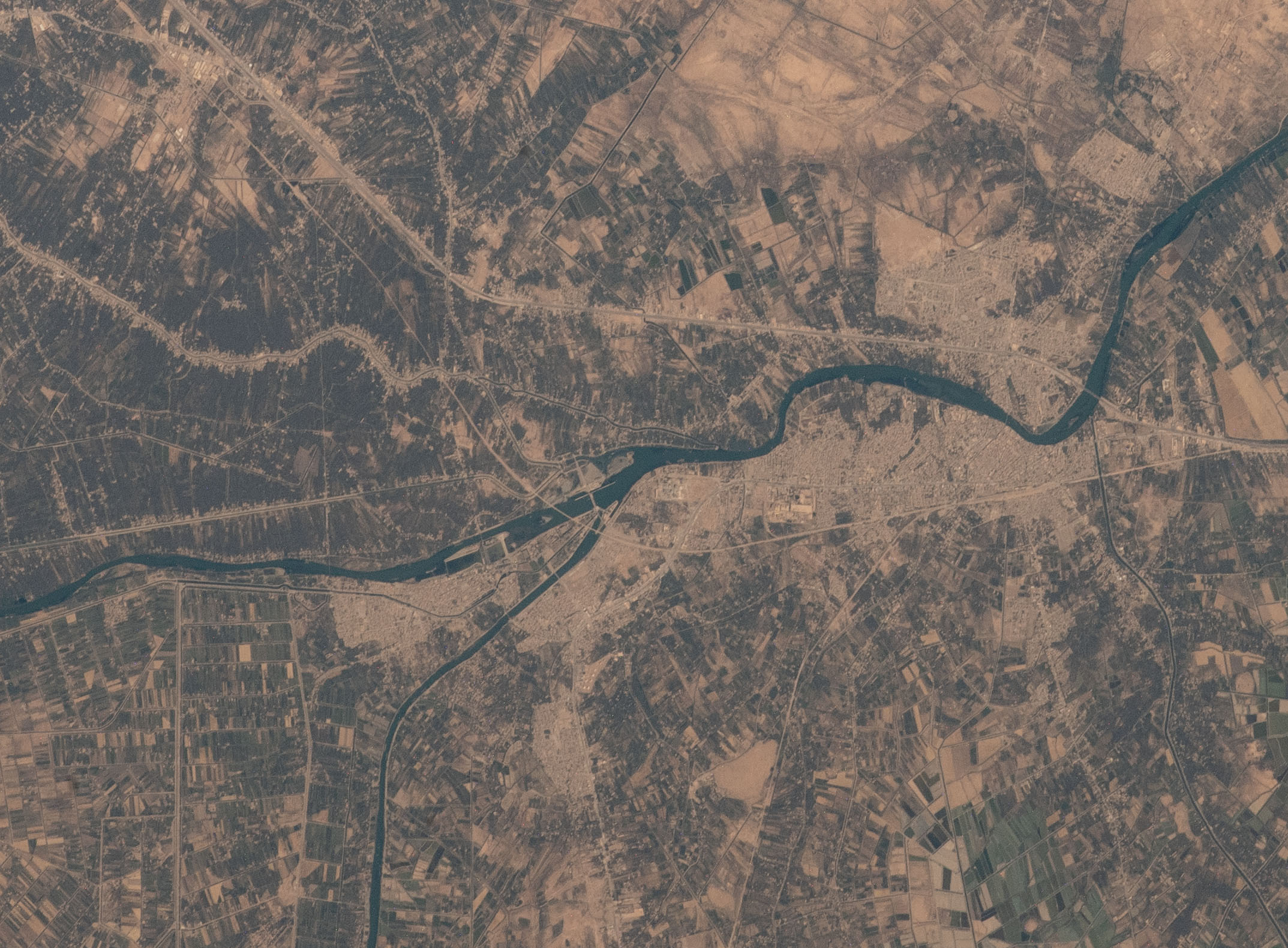
Euphrates, Saddat al Hindiyah, Al Musayyib from above

Saddat al Hindiyah is a town on the Euphrates River in Iraq. It is located just south of Musayyib and 80 km south of Baghdad with a population of 33,900 as of 2018. Its name derives from the Arabic word for "Indian", in reference to the dozens of Indian manual labourers imported to the area by the British post-World War I, to work on the cities vast agricultural lands.

In October 2003, the US Army initiated rehabilitation of roads and swamp areas in the Nasir neighborhood of Sadat al Hindiyah, to improve residents’ access to social and economic networks by draining swamps and paving major roads.

Both the modern and old Hindiya Barrages are located near this town.
