= Hamid Taqavi =

Iranian general (1955–2014)

Shahid Hamid Taqavi
- حمید تقوی
- Born: Hamid Taqavi; 1955; Ahvaz, Imperial State of Iran
- Died: 27 December 2014 (aged 58–59); Samarra, Iraq
- Military career
- Allegiance: Iran
- Branch: Revolutionary Guards
- Service years: 1980–2014
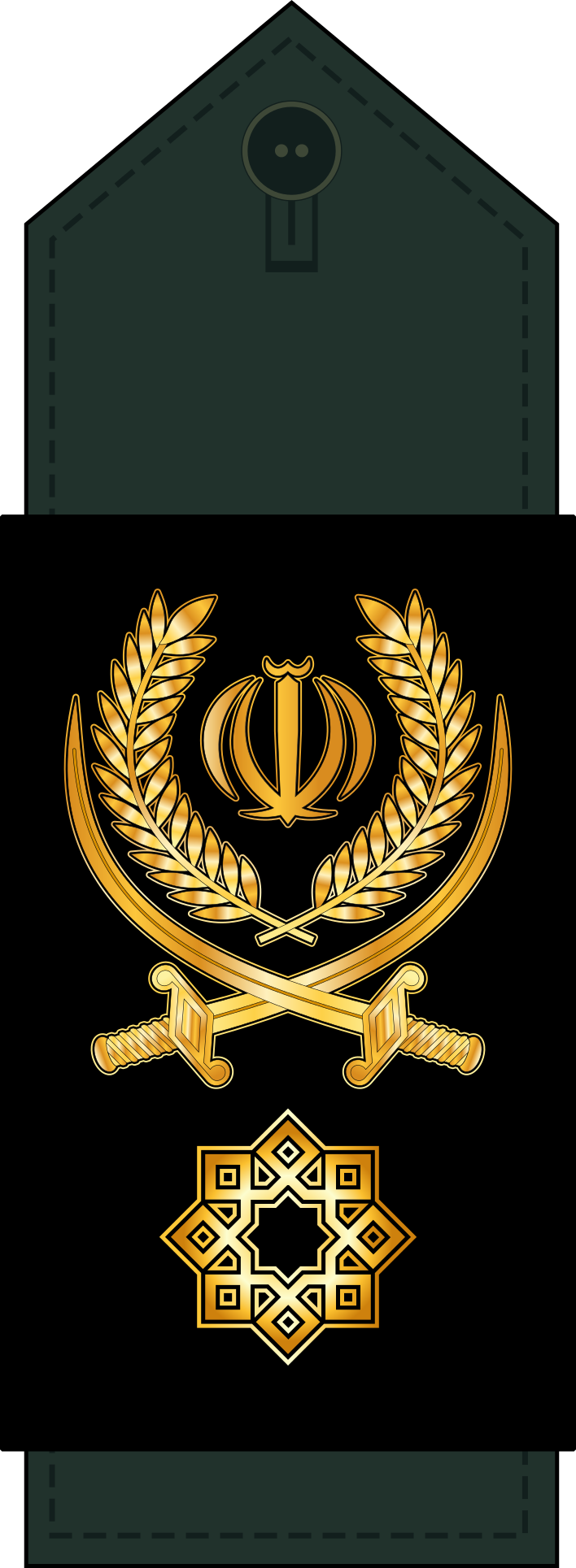
- Rank: Brigadier general
- Nickname: Haj Hamid
- Unit: Quds Force
- Commands: Ramazan Headquarters
- Conflicts: Iran–Iraq War; Operation Kheibar; First Battle of al-Faw; Operation Dawn 8; War in Iraq (2013–2017); Operation Ashura

Brigadier General Hamid Taqavi (Persian: حمید تقوی; 1955 – 27 December 2014) was an Iranian military officer and commander in the IRGC's Quds Force.

A veteran of the Iran–Iraq War, he was reportedly killed in action in late 2014 by an ISIL sniper while on “an advisory mission” during the War in Iraq (2013–17).

== Military career ==
=== Iran–Iraq War ===
He joined the Islamic Revolutionary Guard Corps (IRGC) immediately after the outbreak of the Iran–Iraq War in 1980 and recruited forces from Dasht-e Azadegan, forming a Military Intelligence Unit in Susangerd in southern Iran. He fought in some operations and battles in the war including Operation Kheibar and First Battle of al-Faw, where his father and brother were killed, respectively. During the war, he was promoted to the Ramazan Headquarters command.

=== War on ISIL ===
According to the head of the Badr Organization, Hadi al-Amiri, he "was present in most of the important battles against ISIL and played a key role in the Liberation of Jurf Al Sakhar".

"Taqavi was killed while conducting an operation in cooperation with the Iraqi Army and Popular Mobilization Forces to counter ISIL militants in the vicinity of the Al-Askari shrine", according to a statement by Public Relations Department of the Islamic Revolutionary Guard Corps.

On 30 December 2014, thousands of officers from the Revolutionary Guards gathered in Tehran for Taqavi's funeral, including Qasem Soleimani. Ali Shamkhani said "If people like Taqavi do not shed their blood in Samarra, then we would shed our blood in Sistan, Azerbaijan, Shiraz and Esfahan [to defend Iran]".
