= Al-Mahawil =

Al-Mahawil المحاويل
- Town
- Location within Iraq
- Country: Iraq
- Governorate: Babil

Population (2018)
  - Total: 31,000

Al-Mahawil (Arabic: المحاويل) also Mahawil, Al Maḩāwīl, Qaḑā’ al Maḩāwīl, and Khān al Mahawīl) is one of a very few Sunni Arab towns in the Babil Governorate of southern Iraq . Before the invasion of Iraq, Sunnis made up the vast majority. Today, they are a shrinking minority of the population due to the influx of Shias from the surrounding countryside. Its population was 31,200 in 2018.
