= Babylon Governorate =

Governorate of Iraq

Babylon Governorate محافظة بابل Babil Province
- Governorate
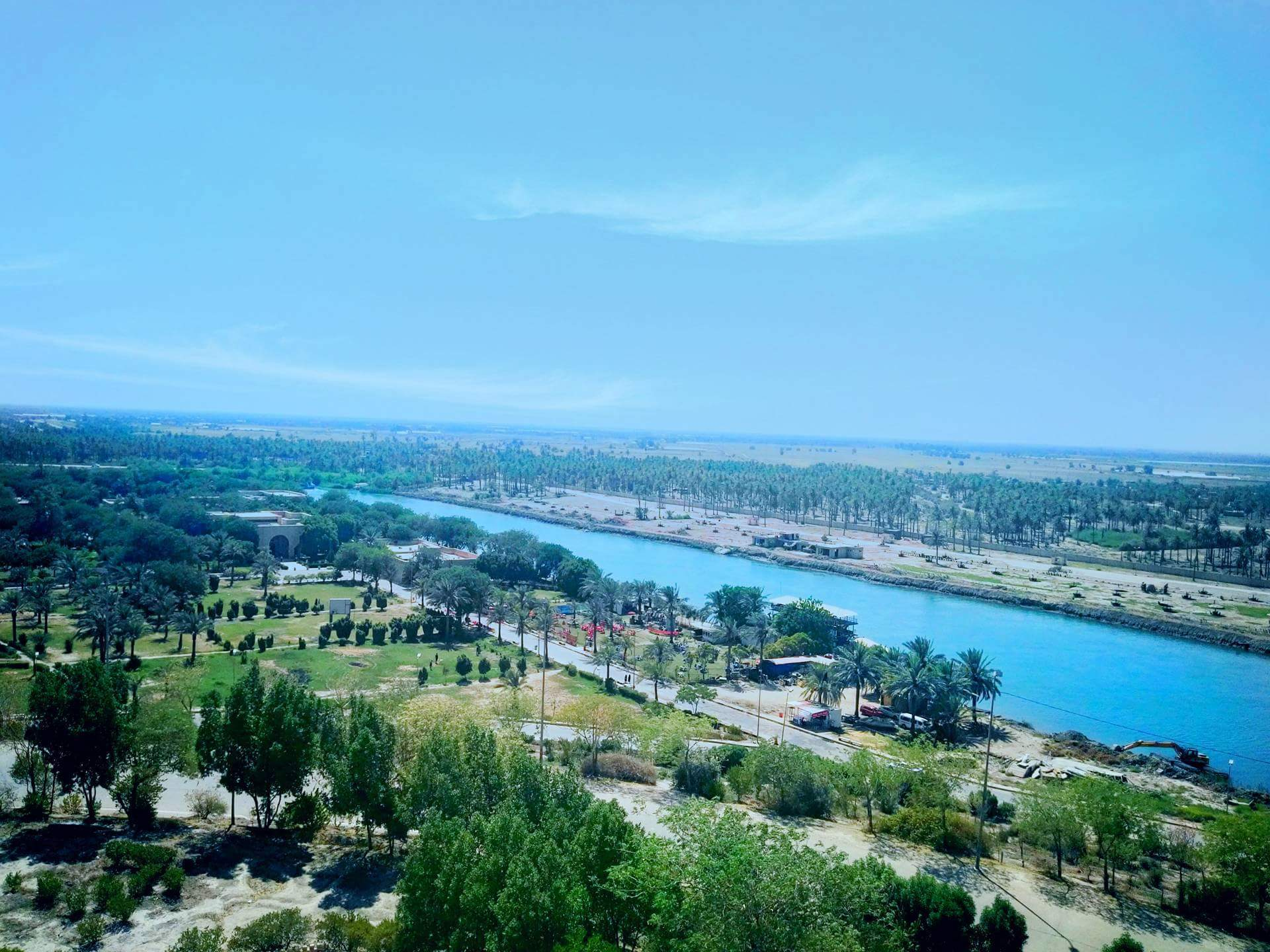
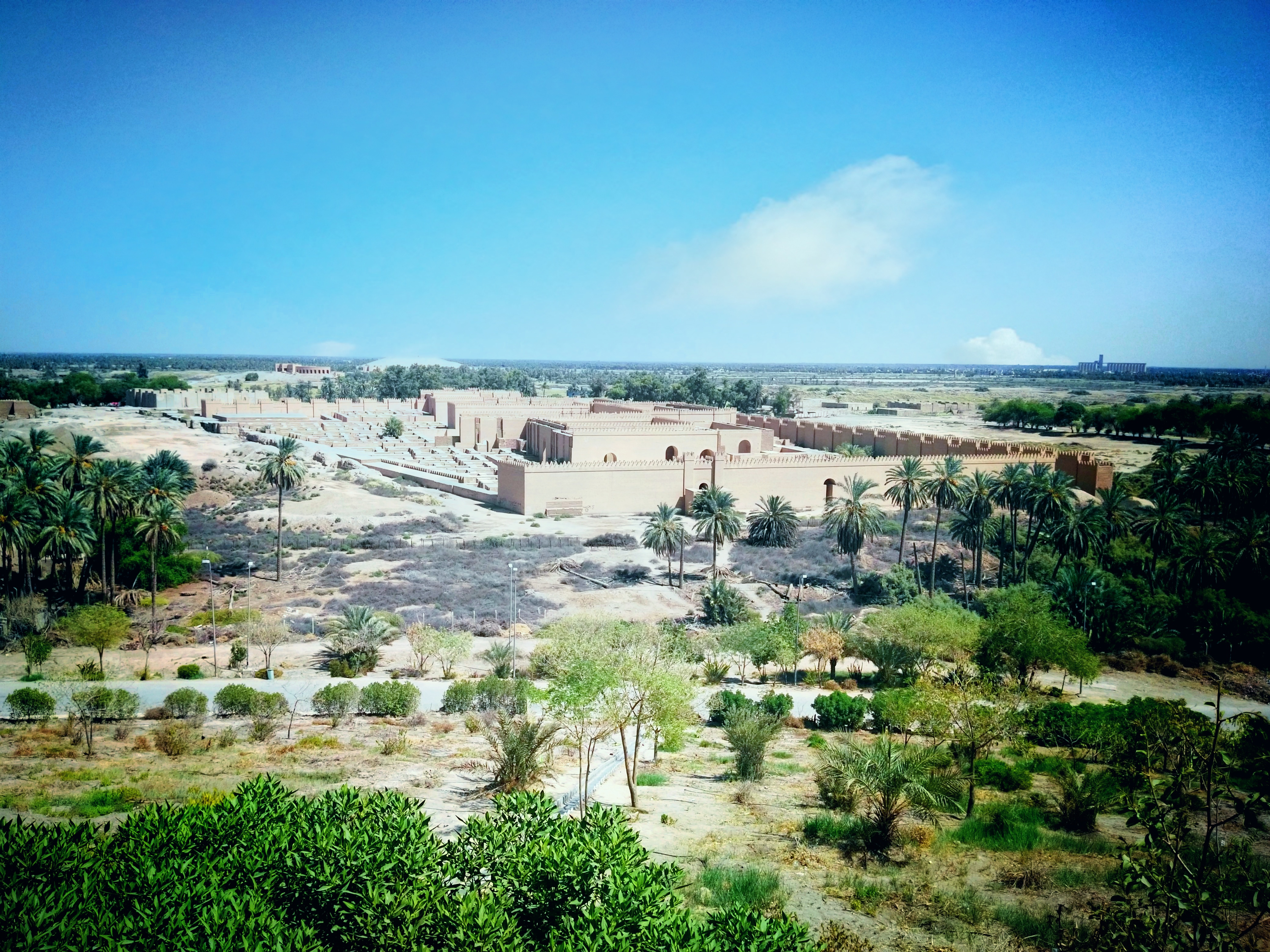
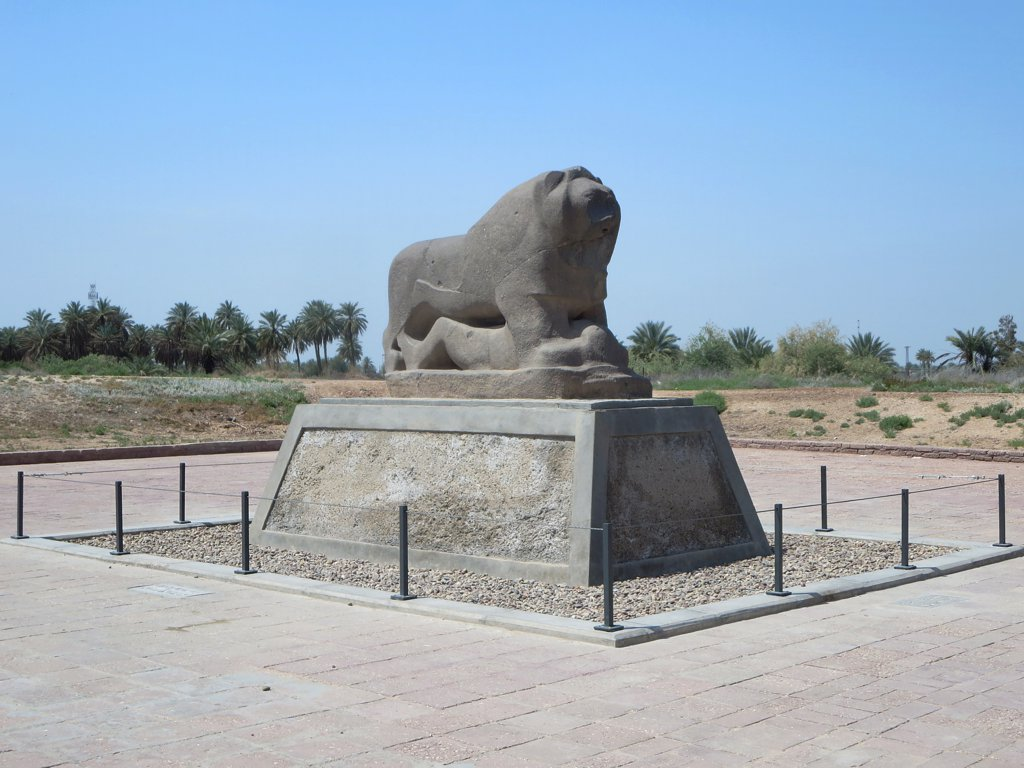
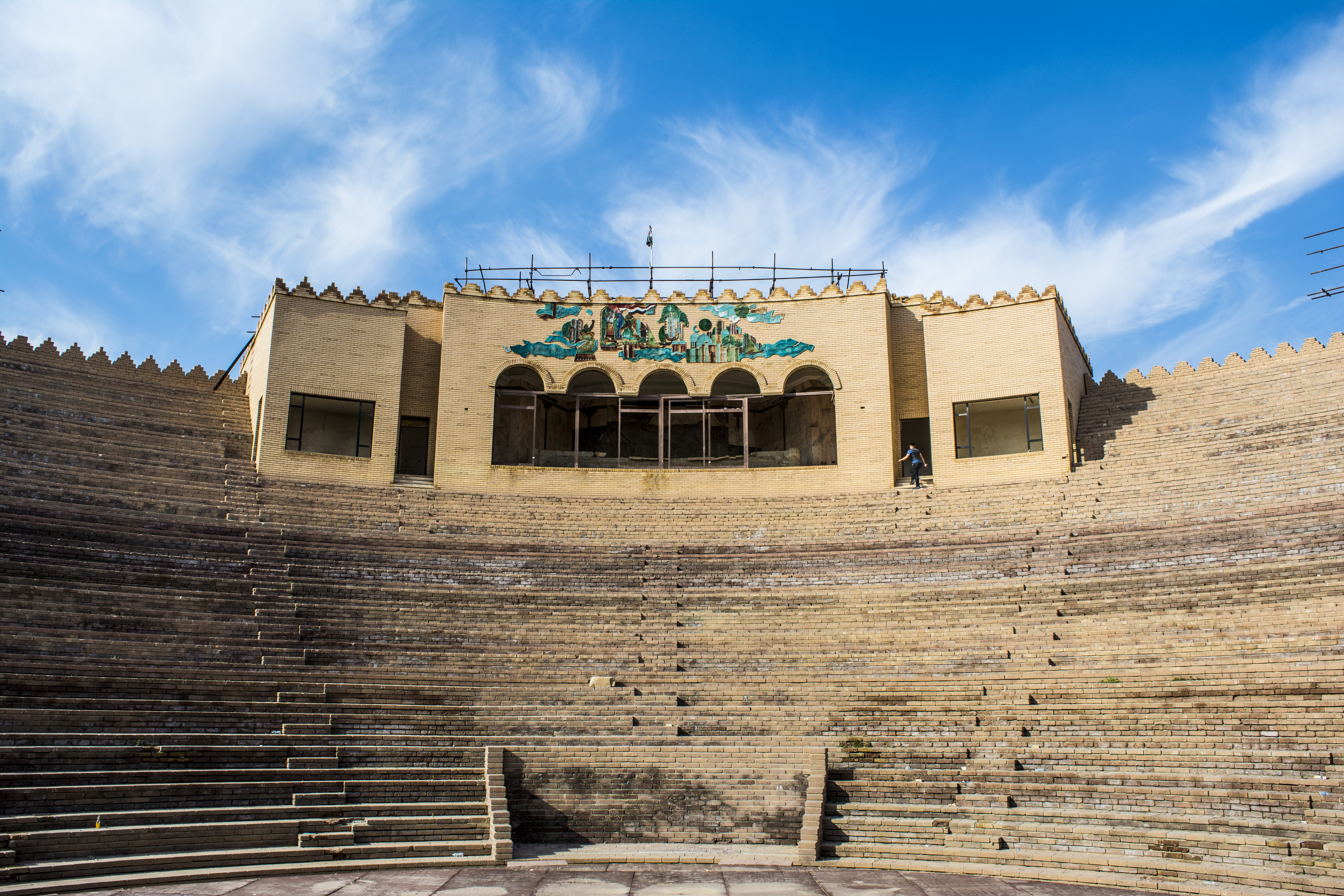
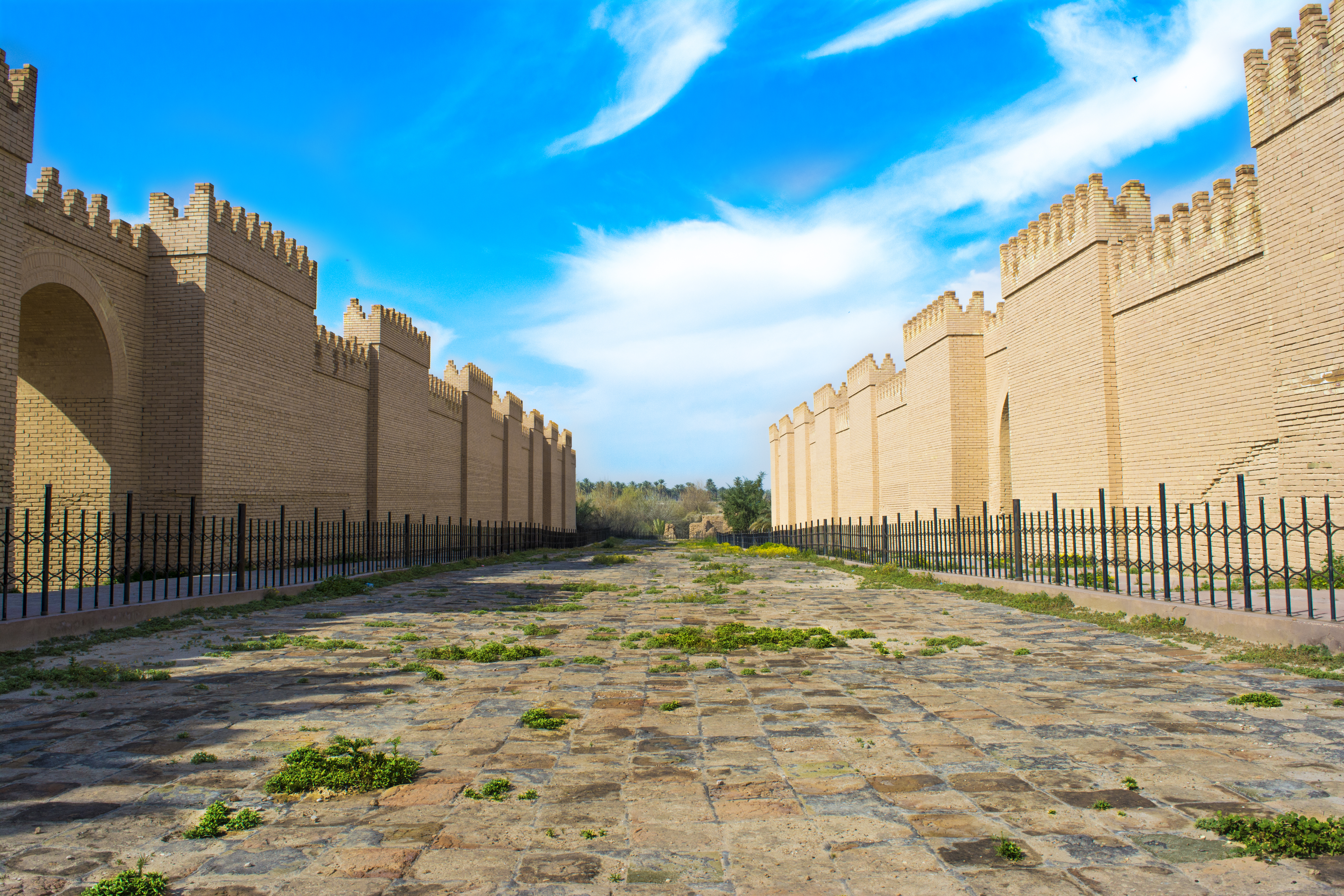
- Historical and ancient monuments

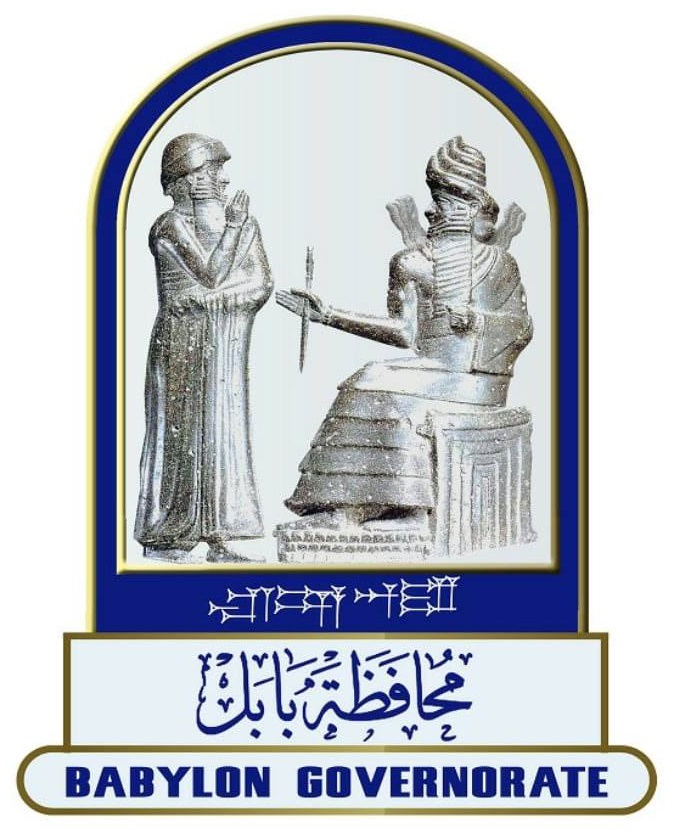
- Seal

- Coordinates: 32°37′N 44°33′E
- Country: Iraq
- Capital: Hillah

Government
  - Governor: Ali Turki al-Jamali

Area
  - Total: 5,119 km^{2} (1,976 sq mi)

Population (2024 census)
  - Total: 2,482,324
  - Density: 484.9/km^{2} (1,256/sq mi)
- ISO 3166 code: IQ-BB
- HDI (2024): 0.722 high · 7th of 18

Babylon Governorate or Babil Province (Arabic: محافظة بابل Muḥāfaẓa Bābil) is a governorate in central Iraq. It has an area of 5,119 square kilometres (1,976 sq mi), The population in Babil for 2023 is 1,820,700. The provincial capital is the city of Hillah, which lies opposite the ancient city of Babylon (بابل), on the Euphrates river.

== History ==
The ancient city of Babylon, in present-day Babylon Province was the capital of ancient Babylonia, situated on the Euphrates river south of Baghdad, Iraq.

The city was occupied from the 3rd millennium BC but became important early in the 2nd millennium under the kings of the First Dynasty of Babylon. The sixth king of this dynasty was Hammurabi (1792–1750 BC) who made Babylon the capital of a vast empire and is best remembered for his code of laws.

The city peaked in pre-eminence when Nabopolassar (626–605 BC) and his successor and son Nebuchadnezzar II (605–562 BC) extended the Neo-Babylonian Empire over most of Western Asia.

In the year 1991, Babil Governorate was the center of a Shia uprising.

== Geography ==
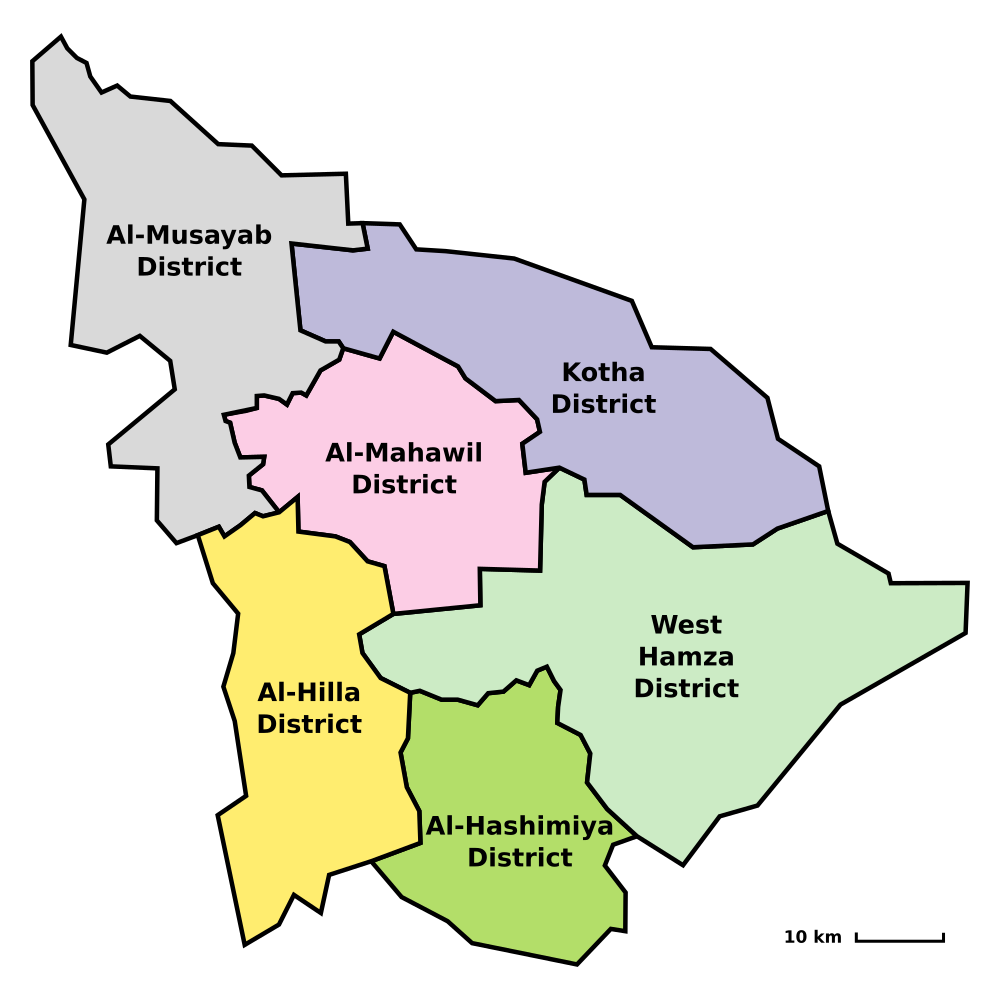
Map of Babil Governorate showing districts

Babylon province is located between 32° to 33.25° north latitude and 44° to 45° east longitude.

=== Districts ===
The Babil Governorate is divided into four districts:

- Al-Mahawil District (Al-Mahawil)
- Al-Musayab District (Al-Musayab)
- Hashimiya District (Al Hashimiyah)
- Hilla District (Hillah)

=== Cities ===
- Babylon – ancient capital
- Hillah (900,000) – provincial capital
- Al Hashimiyah (210,000)
- Al-Qasim (120,000)
- Al Midhatiya (160,000)
- Al-Iskandariya (135,000)
- Musayyib (175,000)
- Jurf Al Nasr (11,000)
- Al-Mahawil (51,000)

=== Postal codes ===
- Hillah –51001— الحلة
- University of Babylon –51002—جامعة بابل
- Bab Al Mashhad–51003—باب المشهد
- Eshtar –51004—عشتار
- Al Emam –51005—الامام
- Musayyib –51006—المسيب
- Iskandariya –51007—الاسكندرية
- Al-Mahawil –51008—المحاويل
- Al Mashrooa' –51009—المشروع
- Saddat al Hindiyah –51010—سدة الهندية
- Al Kifl –51011—الكفل
- Al Hashimiyah –51012—الهاشمية
- Al-Qasim –51013—القاسم
- Al Showmali –51014—الشوملي
- Abi Gharaq –51015—ابي غرق
- Al Midhatiya –51016—المدحتية
- Al Nile –51017—النيل
- Al Talee'a –51018—الطليعة
- Jurf Al Nasr –51019—جرف الصخر

== Demographics ==
Historical population
Year	Pop.	±% p.a.
1977	592,000	—
1987	1,109,574	+6.48%
1997	1,181,751	+0.63%
2009	1,729,666	+3.23%
2024	2,482,324	+2.44%
Source: Citypopulation
