= Hashimiya District =

Hashimiya District Arabic: قضاء الهاشمية
- District
- Location of Hashimiya District in Iraq
- Country: Iraq
- Governorates: Babil Governorate
- Seat: Al Hashimiyah
- Time zone: UTC+3 (AST)

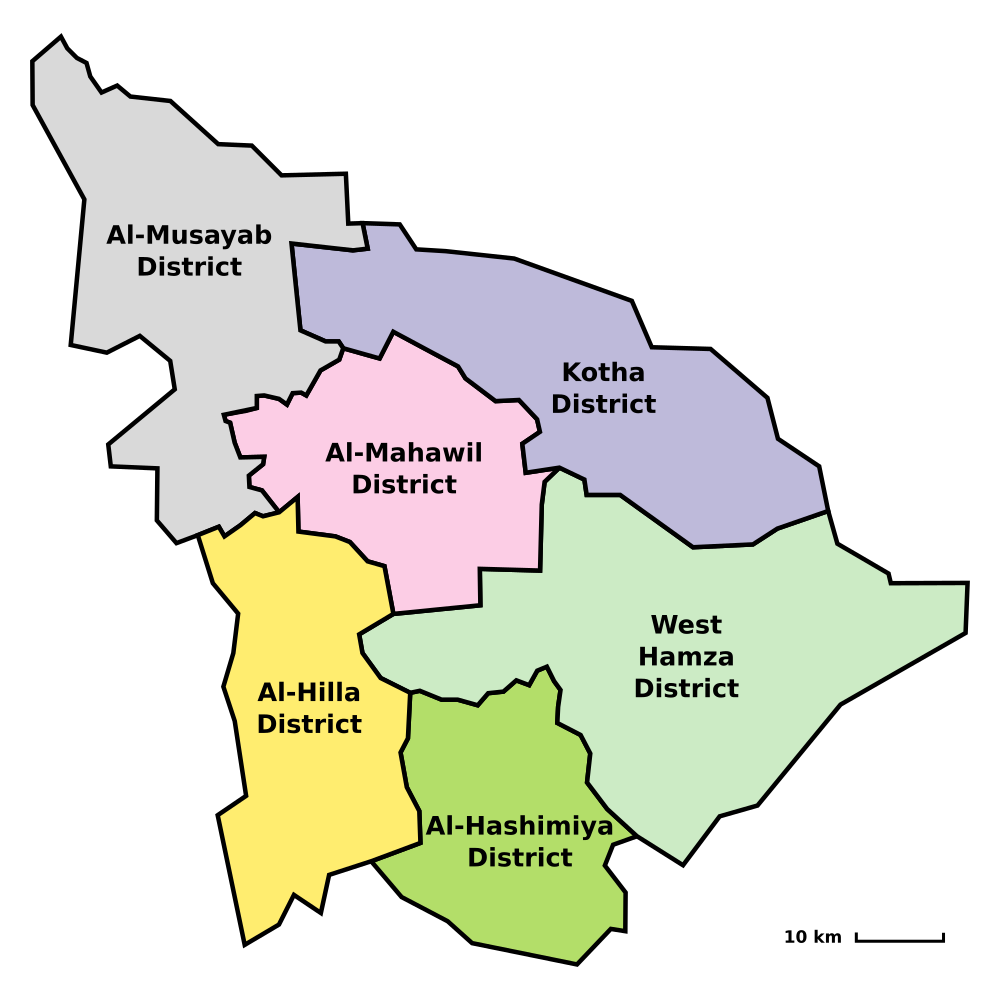
Map of Babil Governorate showing districts

Hashimiya District (Arabic: قضاء الهاشمية) is a district of the Babil Governorate, Iraq. The seat of the district is Al Hashimiyah.
