= Ur Tourist City =

Ur Tourist City مدينة أور السياحية
- City
- Logo

- Location in Iraq
- Coordinates: 30.987401°N 46.091737°E
- Country: Iraq
- Governorate: Dhi Qar
- Launched: 11 August 2021; 5 years ago

Area
  - Total: 0.925 km^{2} (0.357 sq mi)
- Time zone: UTC+3 (AST)

Ur Tourist City (Arabic: مدينة أور السياحية) is a modern heritage and tourism hub established beside the archaeological site of the Sumerian city Ur in Dhi Qar, Iraq, home to the Ziggurat of Ur and – according to Bible and Q'uran – the birthplace of Abraham. The project is intended to provide structured access for pilgrims and visitors and to evolve into a functioning modern city incorporating tourism, residential, educational, and cultural components, with buildings designed to reflect ancient Mesopotamian architecture. It includes Iraq's first dedicated film and media production complex, featuring a large studio for historical Mesopotamian-era works. Construction is being implemented in multi-phase stages under the supervision of the Iraqi Council of Ministers.

== History ==
The development borders the archaeological site of Ur, a major Sumerian centre dating to the fourth millennium BC. Ur is the birthplace of Abraham according to the biblical narrative, giving the site particular significance within the Abrahamic religions. An interfaith gathering led by Pope Francis in 2021 brought renewed international attention to the location.

The project was initiated by the Iraqi government in 2021 as a planned heritage and tourism zone adjacent to the archaeological site. Government statements described it as a large-scale development combining heritage, tourism and service infrastructure. Its principal facilities include an open-air Sumerian theatre, the Ur World Museum, a drama production complex, Iraq's first opera house, a hotel, and associated visitor amenities.

== Development ==
The city is developed in phased stages under the Council of Ministers and the Dhi Qar Reconstruction Fund.

Phase one included completion of the basic design, development of service infrastructure, and construction of key cultural facilities such as the open-air Sumerian theatre, closed theatre, administrative centre and interfaith dialogue centre.

Phase two introduced cultural facilities including the Ur World Museum, a 5,000 m² complex comprising two floors, 28 exhibition halls, a wax museum, meeting rooms and a cinema centre, intended to house 650 excavated artefacts and around 10,000 stored pieces. Construction reached about 90% completion by late 2025, with opening projected for early 2026. It also incorporated civic services including a police station, civil defense unit, clinic and municipal office. This phase also saw the launch of construction of the Inanna International Hotel, a five-star facility with 400 rooms.

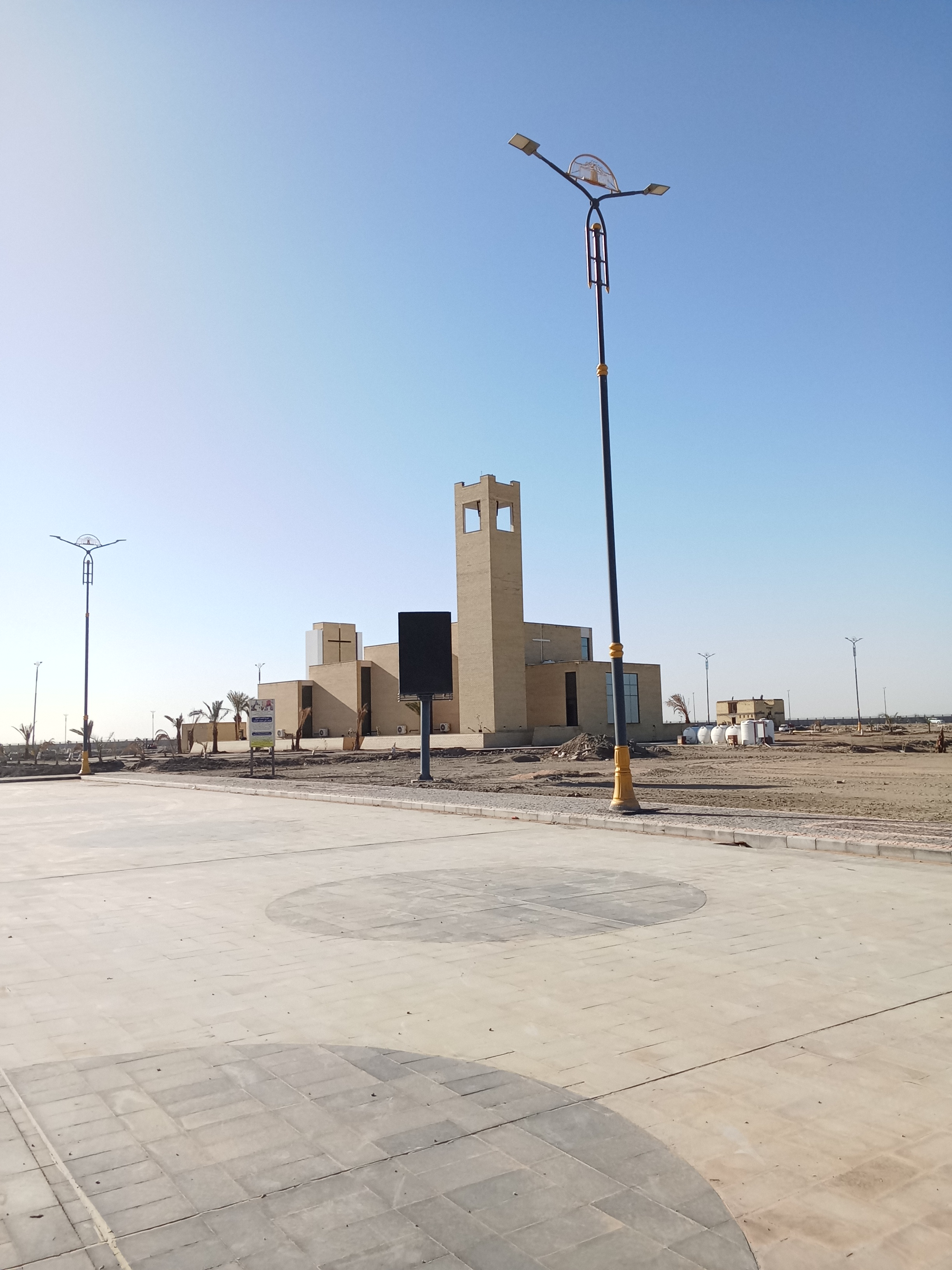
A church in the city in 2024

=== Preservation ===
In 2025, a forestry program planted 2,000 saplings in the tourist city to reduce dust storms, improve the environment, and protect the archaeological zone. The General Authority for Antiquities and Heritage also approved a 19-billion-dinar (US$14.5 million) renovation plan to preserve the ancient site of Ur and support future tourism development.

== Visitors ==
The city has received visitors for cultural, academic and religious purposes. In February 2025, the site recorded 65 graduation events, 5 scientific conferences, 6 workshops, 52 school visits, 33 official delegations, 19 foreign delegations, and 27 organized tourism groups, alongside local family visits. The site operates extended visiting hours during Ramadan. Additionally, government officials have stated that memoranda of understanding with the Vatican are being prepared to organize Christian pilgrimage groups to Ur.

== Transportation ==
Ur Tourist City will be served by the nearby Nasiriyah International Airport, expected to open in early 2026. The terminal is designed for 750,000 passengers per year, with expansion capacity to 2–3 million, and includes an on-site hotel. The airport is planned to relieve pressure on southern airports and operate as a cargo and passenger hub linking Iraq with Middle Eastern routes. Prior to its completion, most visitors have accessed the area through Basra International Airport, with studies citing that approximately 80% of tourists arrived via Basra.

== See also ==
- Tourism in Iraq
- List of World Heritage Sites in Iraq
- Ur
- Sumer
