= Visa policy of Iraq =

Policy on permits required to enter Iraq

In accordance with Iraqi law, citizens of most countries require a visa to visit Iraq. However, visitors from certain countries are given a visa on arrival in select airports and certain countries are banned from entering Iraq.

On the 15th of March 2021, the Iraqi government lifted pre-arrival visa requirements for citizens from 37 countries, allowing citizens from those countries to apply for on-arrival visas at approved land, sea and air border crossings.

From March 1, 2025, Iraq has suspended its visa-on-arrival policy for most nationalities. Travelers who were previously eligible for visas upon arrival must now apply for an electronic visa (e-Visa) before traveling. The application process is available online through the official Iraqi government platform. However, journalists and NGO workers are not eligible for the e-Visa and must obtain a visa through an Iraqi embassy or consulate.

As of September 2025, the Iraqi federal government's 'e-Visa Portal' is solely responsible for providing visas for foreign visitors and it can be used to enter all parts of the country, including to and from Kurdistan Region.

== Visa policy map ==
Visa policy of Iraq Iraq Visa not required (30 days) Visa not required - conditional (30 days) eVisa Admission restricted Admission refused

== Visa exemption ==
=== Ordinary passports ===
Holders of ordinary passports of the following country may enter Iraq without a visa for the following period:

30 days

- Iran
- Lebanon
- Malaysia
- Turkey^{1}

_{1 - Only for people under 15 and above 50.}

=== Non-ordinary passports ===
Holders of diplomatic or service passports of the following countries may enter Iraq without a visa for the following period:

- China^{4 D S}
- Indonesia^{4 D O}
- Iran^{4 D S}
- Kuwait^{4 D S}
- Lebanon^{1 D S}
- Russia^{2 D S}
- Serbia^{2 D S}
- South Korea^{4 D}
- Turkey^{3 D S}

_{D - Diplomatic passports}
_{O - Official passports}
_{S - Service passports}
_{1 - 6 months for diplomatic passports, 3 months for service passports.}
_{2 - 90 days}
_{3 - 45 days}
_{4 - 30 days}

=== Future changes ===
Iraq has signed visa exemption agreements with the following countries, but they have not yet entered into force:

Country	Passports	Agreement signed on
Bangladesh	Diplomatic, official	17 October 2026

== Visa on arrival ==
Since 1 March 2025, the visa on arrival to Federal Iraq has been suspended for 37 countries. The e-Visa system is used instead, and the cost is approximately 160 USD.

== Electronic visa (e-Visa) ==
In April 2024, Iraq launched an electronic visa system for visits of 30 days, which is also valid for travel into Iraqi Kurdistan.

== Iraqi Kurdistan ==
Visa policy of Iraqi Kurdistan Iraq Visa on arrival / eVisa eVisa Visa required Admission refused

As March 1 2023, all travelers traveling to the Kurdistan Region of Iraq will require a visa. Some citizens may obtain an e-Visa / visa on arrival, while others will need to apply an e-Visa through a guarantor (local sponsor). Iraqi Kurdistan has its own eVisa platform, even though the standard Iraqi eVisa can also be used to enter the region. The Iraqi Kurdistan eVisa costs 100,000 IQD, which makes it slightly cheaper than the eVisa for the whole of Iraq.

=== List A Countries ===
Citizens of the following countries may obtain either an eVisa or a visa on arrival. A visa on arrival can be issued at Erbil and Sulaymaniyah airports for 30 days. For some nationalities, a visa can also be issued on arrival at Kirkuk Airport for 60 days.

- All European Union member states
- (Cooperation Council for the Arab States of the Gulf) All Gulf Cooperation Council member states

- Albania^{1}
- Australia
- Azerbaijan^{1}
- Brazil^{1}
- Canada
- China ^{1}
- Iceland^{1}
- Iran
- Japan^{1}
- Jordan^{1}
- Lebanon
- Liechtenstein^{1}
- Malaysia
- New Zealand^{1}
- Norway^{1}
- Russia
- South Korea^{1}
- Switzerland^{1}
- Turkey^{1}
- United Kingdom^{1}
- United States
- Vatican City^{1}

_{1 - Cannot obtain a visa on arrival at Kirkuk Airport}

=== List B Countries ===
Citizens of other countries (except Afghanistan, Bangladesh, Egypt, Ethiopia, Guatemala, Israel, Kenya, Nigeria, Somalia, Uganda and Yemen) may obtain an e-Visa for up to 30 days, but they must have their guarantor apply for the e-Visa on their behalf.

The guarantor is a sponsor registered with the Ministry of Interior, such as a law firm or a manpower company, who supports the application process by providing a unique verification code and arranging payment for the visa on the applicant’s behalf. Once the application is completed online, the guarantor will receive a notification on its status within five business days and if approved, the e-Visa will be issued accordingly.

== Israel ==
Nationals of Israel are banned from entering and transiting in all of Iraq, even if not leaving the aircraft and proceeding by the same flight.

== See also ==
- Visa requirements for Iraqi citizens
- Tourism in Iraq
- Iraqi nationality law
- Iraqi passport
