= Visa requirements for Iraqi citizens =

Administrative entry restrictions

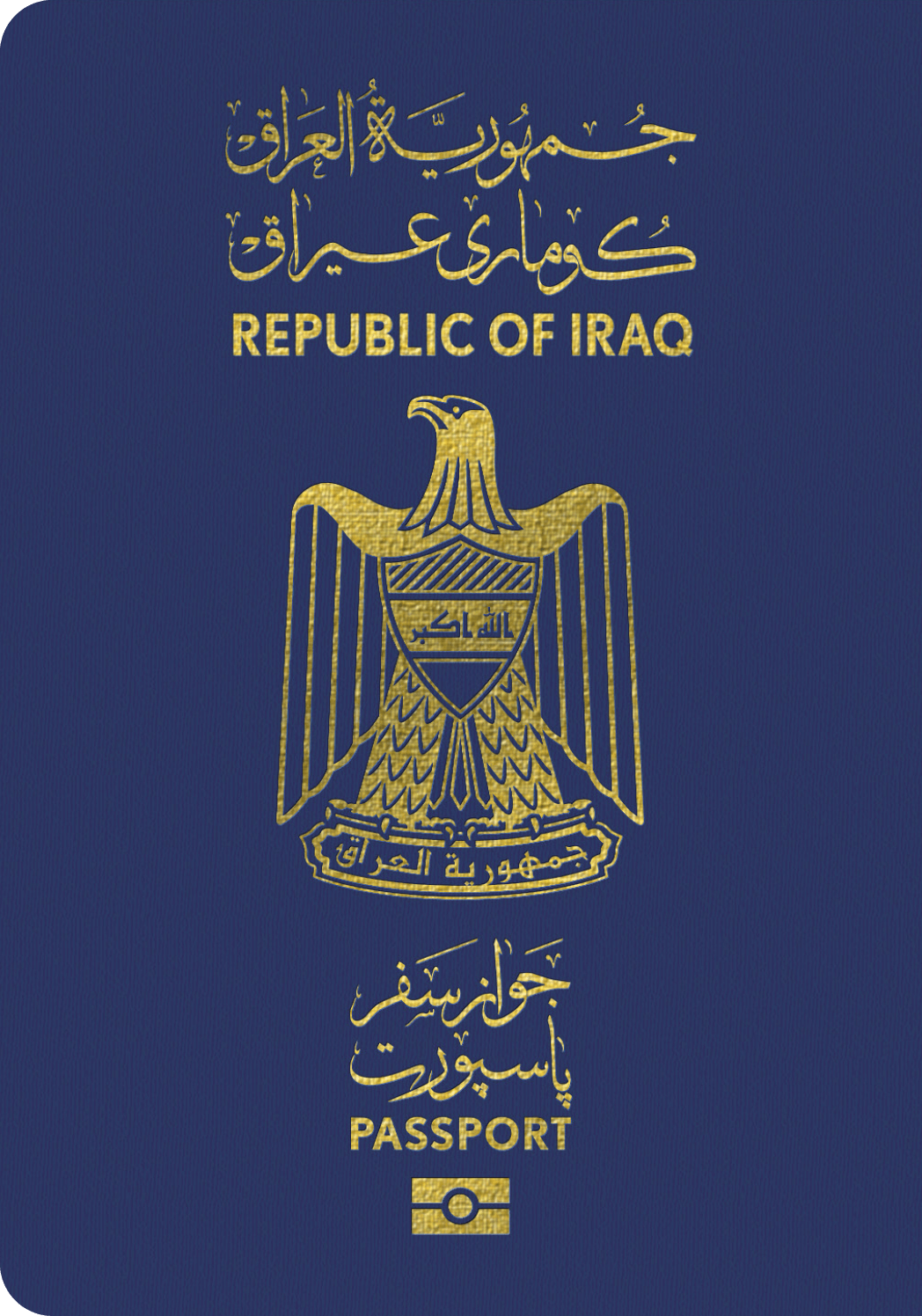
Front cover of an Iraqi passport design

Visa requirements for Iraqi citizens are administrative entry restrictions by the authorities of other states placed on citizens of Iraq.

As of 2026, Iraqi citizens had visa-free or visa on arrival access to 29 countries and territories, ranking the Iraq passport 99th in the world according to the Henley Passport Index.

== Visa requirements map ==
Visa requirements for Iraqi citizens holding ordinary passports Iraq Visa-free Visa available both on arrival or online Visa on arrival eVisa Visa required Travel restricted

== Visa requirements ==
Country	Visa requirement	Allowed stay	Notes (excluding departure fees)
Afghanistan	eVisa		Visa is not required in case born in Afghanistan or can proof that one of their parents is a national of Afghanistan or born in Afghanistan.; e-Visa : Visitors must arrive at Kabul International (KBL).
Albania	eVisa		Visa is not required for Holders of a valid multiple-entry Schengen, UK or US visa has been previously used once or residence permit of Ireland, Schengen, UK, US or UAE 10 years.
Algeria	Visa required		
Andorra	Visa required		Visa free for a maximum stay of 90 days within 180 days for valid visa holders or residents of the Schengen Area member states.
Angola	eVisa		
Antigua and Barbuda	eVisa	30 days	Visa free for a maximum stay of 30 days for valid visa holders or residents of the Schengen Area member states, the United Kingdom, the United States and Canada.
Argentina	Visa required		
Armenia	eVisa		Eligible for an eVisa if holding the following mandatory documents: 1. Travel (Medical) Insurance; 2. A valid residence permit or valid visa issued by the EU and Schengen member states, the USA, Australia, New Zealand, the Republic of Korea, the UK, Canada, the Russian Federation, or Japan, or a valid residence permit issued by the GCC member states.
Australia	Visa required		May apply online (Online Visitor e600 visa).
Austria	Visa required		
Azerbaijan	Visa required		Iraqi citizes are eligible to obtain a 30-day tourist Visa on Arrival if holding a residence permit issued by one of GCC state members. They must present their valid visa or residence permit along with their passport.
Bahamas	eVisa		
Bahrain	eVisa / Visa on arrival	14 days	
Bangladesh	Visa required		
Barbados	Visa required		
Belarus	Visa required		
Belgium	Visa required		
Belize	Visa required		
Benin	eVisa	30 days	
Bhutan	eVisa		Holders of an application for a tourist visa can obtain a visa on arrival.
Bolivia	Online Visa		
Bosnia and Herzegovina	Visa required		Visa not required for 30 days if holding multiple-entry visa issued by Bulgaria, Croatia, Cyprus, Ireland (Rep.), Monaco, Romania, USA, United Kingdom or a Schengen Member State.
Botswana	eVisa	3 months	
Brazil	Visa required		
Brunei	Visa required		
Bulgaria	Visa required		
Burkina Faso	eVisa		
Burundi	Visa on arrival	1 month	
Cambodia	eVisa / Visa on arrival	30 days	
Cameroon	eVisa		Pre-arranged visa can be picked up on arrival.
Canada	Visa required		
Cape Verde	Visa on arrival	3 months	
Central African Republic	Visa required		
Chad	Visa required		Pre-arranged visa can be picked up on arrival.
Chile	Visa required		
China	Visa required		24-hour visa-free transit through any international airports of China (except Ürümqi), allows domestic travel through different airports. (Note: Custom procedure for 24-hour visa-free transit is required in principle, except in Beijing (both Capital and Daxing), Shanghai Pudong, Hangzhou, Xiamen, Guangzhou, Shenzhen, Chengdu Tianfu and Xi'an if no leaving of international transit areas.); Visa on arrival for Macao
Colombia	Online Visa		Online visa application available.
Comoros	Visa on arrival	45 days	
Republic of the Congo	Visa required		Visa not required if passengers have a V.I.P invitation letter.
Democratic Republic of the Congo	eVisa	7 days	Passenger with a letter (Visa Volant) issued by the Ministry of Interior and Security can obtain a visa on arrival.
Costa Rica	Visa required		Visa free for a maximum stay of 30 days for valid visa holders or residents of the United States and Canada.
Côte d'Ivoire	eVisa	3 months	
Croatia	Visa required		Croatia embassy in Baghdad.
Cuba	Visa required		Eligible to travel to Cuba with a tourist card only without visa if hold a valid visa or permanent residence permit issued by Canada, the United States or an EU member state.
Cyprus	Visa required		
Czech Republic	Visa required		
Denmark	Visa required		
Djibouti	eVisa	90 days	
Dominica	Visa not required	21 days	Visa free for a maximum stay of 6 months for valid visa holders or residents of the Schengen Area member states, the United Kingdom, the United States and Canada.
Dominican Republic	Visa required		Visa free for a maximum stay of 90 days for valid visa holders or residents of the Schengen Area member states, the United Kingdom, Ireland, the United States and Canada.
Ecuador	Visa required		
Egypt	eVisa		Iraqi citizens with visa or residence cards from Europe or the United States, Canada, Britain and Australia can visit Egypt without a visa.
El Salvador	Visa required		
Equatorial Guinea	eVisa		
Eritrea	Visa required		Pre-arranged visa can be picked up on arrival.
Estonia	Visa required		
Eswatini	Visa required		
Ethiopia	Visa required		Credit card payment transactions are not accepted when applying for e-Visa.
Fiji	eVisa		
Finland	Visa required		
France	Visa required		
Gabon	eVisa	90 days	e-Visa holders must arrive via Libreville International Airport.
Gambia	Visa required		Visa not required if Passengers traveling as tourists on a charter flight.
Georgia	Visa required		eVisa available if holding a valid visa or residency permit from EEA Member State, Australia, Bermuda, Canada, GCC member state, Japan, Korea (Rep.), New Zealand, Switzerland, USA or United Kingdom.
Germany	Visa required		
Ghana	Visa required		Pre-arranged visa can be picked up on arrival.
Greece	Visa required		
Grenada	Visa required		
Guatemala	Visa required		
Guinea	eVisa	90 days	
Guinea-Bissau	Visa on arrival	90 days	
Guyana	Visa required		Those travelling as tourists can obtain a visa on arrival for a maximum stay of 30 days provided holding a letter of invitation from sponsor or host.
Haiti	Visa not required	3 months	
Honduras	Visa required		
Hungary	Visa required		
Iceland	Visa required		
India	Visa required		
Indonesia	Visa required		
Iran	Visa not required		Visa cancellation between Iran and Iraq came into force on October 26, 2021.
Ireland	Visa required		
Israel	Travel banned		Iraq has never recognised Israel; Travel to Israel illegal and punishable by law, per article 4 of Law of Criminalizing the Normalization with the Zionist Entity; Only those who have obtained prior approval from the Iraqi Ministry of Interior and are travelling there solely for the purpose of religious pilgrimage are exempt from the punishment stipulated in Article 4
Italy	Visa required		
Jamaica	Visa required		
Japan	Visa required		
Jordan	Visa on Arrival		
Kazakhstan	Visa required		Visitors arriving from a country without Kazakh representation and holding an invitation letter (approved by the Ministry of Interior of Kazakhstan with an official invitation number), can obtain a single entry eVisa (on QazETA application) for a max. stay of 1 month.
Kenya	Electronic Travel Authorisation	90 days	Applications can be submitted up to 90 days prior to travel and must be submitted at least 3 days in advance.; eTA fee is 32.50 USD.; Proof of reservation at the hotel where visitors plan to stay is required (if staying with friends, an invitation letter is also acceptable).; Yellow fever vaccination certificate is required if coming from endemic countries.
Kiribati	Visa required		
North Korea	Visa required		
South Korea	Visa required		
Kuwait	Visa required		Passengers with a confirmation that a visa has been approved before departure can collect their original visa at immigration counter.
Kyrgyzstan	eVisa		e-Visa holders must arrive via Manas International Airport or Osh Airport or through land crossings with China (at Irkeshtam and Torugart), Kazakhstan (at Ak-jol, Ak-Tilek, Chaldybar, Chon-Kapka), Tajikistan (at Bor-Dobo, Kulundu, Kyzyl-Bel) and Uzbekistan (at Dostuk).
Laos	Visa required		
Latvia	Visa required		
Lebanon	Free visa on arrival	30 days	Extendable for 3 months.
Lesotho	eVisa		
Liberia	Visa required		Pre-arranged visa can be picked up on arrival.
Libya	Visa required		
Liechtenstein	Visa required		
Lithuania	Visa required		
Luxembourg	Visa required		
Madagascar	eVisa / Visa on arrival	60 days	
Malawi	eVisa	90 days	
Malaysia	Visa not required	30 days	
Maldives	Free visa on arrival	30 days	
Mali	Visa required		
Malta	Visa required		
Marshall Islands	Visa required		
Mauritania	eVisa	30 days	Available at Nouakchott–Oumtounsy International Airport.
Mauritius	Visa required		
Mexico	Visa required		Visa free for a maximum stay of 180 days for valid visa holders or residents of the Schengen Area member states, the United Kingdom, the United States, Canada and Japan.
Micronesia	Visa not required	30 days	
Moldova	Visa required		Citizens holding a residence permit or a valid visa issued by one of the member states of the European Union or one of the parties to the Schengen Agreement can apply for an electronic visa.; Invitation letter holders may apply for a visa electronically.
Monaco	Visa required		
Mongolia	Visa required		Pre-arranged visa can be picked up on arrival.
Montenegro	Visa required		Visa free for a maximum stay of 30 days for valid visa holders or residents of the Schengen Area member states, the United Kingdom, Ireland and the United States.
Morocco	Visa required		
Mozambique	eVisa / Visa on arrival	30 days	
Myanmar	Visa required		Passengers with a letter of approval issued by the Ministry of Hotels and Tourism can obtain a visa on arrival
Namibia	Visa required		
Nauru	Visa required		Pre-arranged visa can be picked up on arrival.
Nepal	Visa required		
Netherlands	Visa required		
New Zealand	Visa required		Iraqi S series passports are unacceptable, and visas will not be endorsed in them.; Holders of an Australian Permanent Resident Visa or Resident Return Visa may be granted a New Zealand Resident Visa on arrival permitting indefinite stay (pursuant to the Trans-Tasman Travel Arrangement), subject to meeting character requirements and obtaining an Electronic Travel Authority prior to departure.
Nicaragua	Visa required		
Niger	Visa required		Pre-arranged visa can be picked up on arrival.
Nigeria	eVisa	90 days	Holders of written e-Visa approval issued by Immigration Authority can obtain a visa on arrival, provided holding a visa application form and e-Visa application payment receipt and holding an invitation letter from Nigerian company accepting immigration responsibilities.
North Macedonia	Visa required		Visa free for a maximum stay of 15 days for valid visa holders of the Schengen Area member states.
Norway	Visa required		
Oman	Visa required		
Pakistan	ETA / Online Visa	30 days / 3 months	Online Visa eligible.; Issued in 7-10 business days.
Palau	Free visa on arrival	30 days	
Panama	Visa required		Visa free for a maximum stay of 30 days for valid visa holders or residents of Australia, the United Kingdom, the United States and Canada.
Papua New Guinea	eVisa	60 days	Visitors may apply for a visa online under the "Tourist - Own Itinerary" category.
Paraguay	Visa required		
Peru	Visa required		
Philippines	Visa required		Residents of the United Arab Emirates may obtain an eVisa through the official Philippine eVisa website. A valid Emirati residence visa must be shown upon an eVisa application.
Poland	Visa required		
Portugal	Visa required		
Qatar	eVisa		Visitors may apply for a visa on the Hayya website.
Romania	Visa required		
Russia	Visa required		
Rwanda	eVisa / Visa on arrival	30 days	
Saint Kitts and Nevis	eVisa		
Saint Lucia	Visa required		
Saint Vincent and the Grenadines	Visa required		
Samoa	Visa not required	60 days	
San Marino	Visa required		
São Tomé and Príncipe	eVisa		Holders of a visa issued by the United States or a Schengen area member state do not require a visa for stays up to 15 days.
Saudi Arabia	Visa required		
Senegal	Visa required		Visa not required for Passengers with an official invitation letter.
Serbia	Visa required		Visa free for a maximum stay of 90 days within 180 days for valid visa holders or residents of the Schengen Area member states, the United Kingdom, Ireland and the United States.
Seychelles	Electronic Border System	3 months	Application can be submitted up to 30 days before travel.; Visitors must upload a reservation confirmation(s) for each visitor's location of stay in Seychelles.; Yellow fever vaccination certificate is required if coming from endemic countries.; Payment of the fee (EUR 10) by credit or debit card.; Valid for one journey only and it expires once exit the country.
Sierra Leone	eVisa	3 months	
Singapore	Visa required		
Slovakia	Visa required		
Slovenia	Visa required		
Solomon Islands	Visa required		Pre-arranged visa can be picked up on arrival.
Somalia	eVisa	30 days	Available at Bosaso, Galcaio and Mogadishu airports.
South Africa	Visa required		
South Sudan	eVisa		Obtainable online.; Printed visa authorization must be presented at the time of travel.
Spain	Visa required		
Sri Lanka	eVisa / Visa on arrival	60 days / 30 days	Sri Lanka introduced an ETA valid for 30 days.
Sudan	Visa required		Passengers with an "Entry Permit" issued by the Sudanese Ministry of Interior can obtain a visa on arrival.
Suriname	Visa not required	90 days	An entrance fee of USD 50 or EUR 50 must be paid online prior to arrival.; Multiple entry e-Visa is also available.
Sweden	Visa required		
Switzerland	Visa required		
Syria	Visa not required		Valid National ID Card
Tajikistan	eVisa	60 days	Pre-arranged visa can be picked up on arrival.
Tanzania	Visa required		
Thailand	eVisa		
Timor-Leste	Visa on arrival	30 days	
Togo	eVisa	15 days	
Tonga	Visa required		
Trinidad and Tobago	eVisa		Pre-arranged visa can be picked up on arrival.
Tunisia	Visa not required	15 days	
Turkey	Visa required		Visa not required for travelers Aged less than 15 and more than 50 years old ( Effective 1st of September 2024). Holders of a valid visa or residence permit from Schengen area countries, Ireland, the United Kingdom or the United States can apply for eVisa.
Turkmenistan	Visa required		
Tuvalu	Visa on arrival	1 month	
Uganda	eVisa	3 months	Determined at the port of entry.
Ukraine	Visa required		
United Arab Emirates	Visa required		May apply using 'Smart service'.
United Kingdom	Visa required		
United States	Visa required		
Uruguay	Visa required		
Uzbekistan	Visa required		Pre-arranged visa can be picked up on arrival.
Vanuatu	eVisa		
Vatican City	Visa required		
Venezuela	eVisa		Introduction of Electronic Visa System for Tourist and Business Travelers.
Vietnam	eVisa		e-Visa is valid for 90 days and multiple entry.; Prearranged visa obtained online through travel agencies available at Hanoi, Ho Chi Minh City, Phu Quoc or Da Nang airports.; Phú Quốc – visa exemption for up to 30 days.
Yemen	Visa required		
Zambia	Visa not required	90 days	For tourism purposes only.
Zimbabwe	eVisa	3 months	

=== Dependent, Disputed, or Restricted territories ===
Unrecognized or partially recognized countries

Visitor to	Conditions of access	Notes
Kosovo	Visa required	
Northern Cyprus	Entry permit on arrival	* Allowed stay: Up to 90 days Entry permission is decided at the port of entry; conditions apply.
Palestine	Visa required	Entry and transit rules depend on the crossing and the controlling authority.
Somaliland	Visa on arrival	Visa on arrival is reported for international travelers arriving at airports under Somaliland jurisdiction.
Taiwan	Visa required	
Transnistria	Visa not required	Registration is required for stays longer than 24 hours.

Territories of other countries

Visitor to	Conditions of access	Notes
China
Hong Kong	Visa required	
Macau	Visa on arrival	* Allowed stay: 30 days. Individual single-entry fee: MOP 200.
Denmark
Faroe Islands	Visa required	
Greenland	Visa required	
France
French Guiana	Visa required	
French Polynesia	Visa required	
(France) French West Indies	Visa required	Includes Guadeloupe, Martinique, Saint Martin, and Saint Barthélemy.
Mayotte	Visa required	
New Caledonia	Visa required	
Réunion	Visa required	
Saint Pierre and Miquelon	Visa required	
Wallis and Futuna	Visa required	
Netherlands
Aruba	Visa required	
Curaçao	Visa required	
Sint Maarten	Visa required	
New Zealand
Cook Islands	Visa on arrival	* Allowed stay: 31 days
Niue	Visa required	
Tokelau	Visa required	
United Kingdom
Anguilla	Visa required	
Bermuda	Visa required	
British Indian Ocean Territory	Special permit required	Access is restricted and requires prior authorization.
British Virgin Islands	Visa required	
Cayman Islands	Visa required	
Falkland Islands	Visa required	
Gibraltar	Visa required	
Montserrat	eVisa	
Pitcairn Islands	Visa not required	* Allowed stay: 14 days Landing fee applies.
Ascension Island	eVisa	* Allowed stay: 3 months All visitors require an entry visa before travel; there is no visa-on-arrival facility.
Saint Helena	eVisa	* Allowed stay: 90 days
Tristan da Cunha	Permission required	Prior permission from the Island Council is required.
South Georgia and the South Sandwich Islands	Special permit required	A pre-arrival permit is required.
Turks and Caicos Islands	Visa required	
United States
American Samoa	Visa required	
Guam	Visa required	
Northern Mariana Islands	Visa required	
U.S. Virgin Islands	Visa required	
Antarctica and adjacent islands
Bouvet Island	Special permit required	Uninhabited territory; prior permission is required for visits.

== Non-visa restrictions ==
=== Blank passport pages ===
Many countries require a minimum number of blank pages to be available in the passport being presented, typically one or two pages. Endorsement pages, which often appear after the visa pages, are not counted as being valid or available.

=== Vaccination ===
Cover of the new International Certificate of Vaccination issued by the Bureau of Quarantine in the Philippines since 2021

The African countries of Angola, Benin, Burkina Faso, Burundi, Cameroon, Central African Republic, Democratic Republic of the Congo, Republic of the Congo, Côte d'Ivoire, Gabon, Ghana, Guinea-Bissau, Mali, Niger, Sierra Leone and Togo, South Sudan and Uganda, along with French Guiana in South America, require all incoming passengers older than nine months to one year, to have a current International Certificate of Vaccination or Prophylaxis.

Some other countries require vaccination only if the passenger is coming from an infected area or has visited one recently or has transited for 12 hours in those countries: Algeria, Botswana, Cabo Verde, Chad, Djibouti, Egypt, Eswatini, Ethiopia, Gambia, Ghana, Guinea, Lesotho, Libya, Equatorial Guinea, Eritrea, Madagascar, Malawi, Mauritania, Mauritius, Mozambique, Namibia, Nigeria, Papua New Guinea, Seychelles, Somalia, South Africa, Sudan, Tunisia, Uganda, Tanzania, Zambia and Zimbabwe.

=== Passport validity length ===
Very few countries, such as Paraguay, just require a valid passport on arrival.

However many countries and groupings now require only an identity card – especially from their neighbours. Other countries may have special bilateral arrangements that depart from the generality of their passport validity length policies to shorten the period of passport validity required for each other's citizens or even accept passports that have already expired (but not been cancelled).

Some countries, such as Japan, Ireland and the United Kingdom, require a passport valid throughout the period of the intended stay.

In the absence of specific bilateral agreements, countries requiring passports to be valid for at least 6 more months on arrival include Afghanistan, Algeria, Anguilla, Bahrain, Bhutan, Botswana, British Virgin Islands, Brunei, Cambodia, Cameroon, Cape Verde, Cayman Islands, Central African Republic, Chad, Comoros, Costa Rica, Côte d'Ivoire, Curaçao, Ecuador, Egypt, El Salvador, Equatorial Guinea, Fiji, Gabon, Guinea Bissau, Guyana, Haiti, India, Indonesia, Iran, Iraq, Israel, Jordan, Kenya, Kiribati, Kuwait, Laos, Madagascar, Malaysia, Marshall Islands, Mongolia, Myanmar, Namibia, Nepal, Nicaragua, Nigeria, Oman, Palau, Papua New Guinea, Peru, Philippines, Qatar, Rwanda, Samoa, Saudi Arabia, Singapore, Solomon Islands, Somalia, Sri Lanka, Sudan, Suriname, Tanzania, Thailand, Timor-Leste, Tokelau, Tonga, Turkey, Tuvalu, Uganda, United Arab Emirates, Vanuatu, Venezuela, and Vietnam.

Countries requiring passports valid for at least 4 months on arrival include Micronesia and Zambia.

Countries requiring passports with a validity of at least 3 months beyond the date of intended departure include Azerbaijan, Bosnia and Herzegovina, Honduras, Montenegro, Nauru, Moldova and New Zealand. Similarly, the EEA countries of Iceland, Liechtenstein, Norway, all European Union countries (except Ireland) together with Switzerland also require 3 months validity beyond the date of the bearer's intended departure unless the bearer is an EEA or Swiss national.

Countries requiring passports valid for at least 3 months on arrival include Albania, North Macedonia, Panama, and Senegal.

Bermuda requires passports to be valid for at least 45 days upon entry.

Countries that require a passport validity of at least one month beyond the date of intended departure include Eritrea, Hong Kong, Lebanon, Macau, the Maldives and South Africa.

==== Maximum passport age ====
Countries of the Schengen area require non-EU passports to be less than 10 years old upon entry.

=== Criminal record ===
Some countries, including Australia, Canada, Fiji, New Zealand and the United States, routinely deny entry to non-citizens who have a criminal record, while others impose restrictions depending on the type of conviction and the length of the sentence.

=== Persona non grata ===
The government of a country can declare a diplomat persona non grata, banning them from entering the country or expelling them if they have already entered. In non-diplomatic use, the authorities of a country may also declare a foreigner persona non grata permanently or temporarily, usually because of unlawful activity.

=== Israeli stamps ===
Kuwait, Lebanon, Libya, and Yemen do not allow entry to people with passport stamps from Israel or whose passports have either a used or an unused Israeli visa, or where there is evidence of previous travel to Israel such as entry or exit stamps from neighbouring border posts in transit countries such as Jordan and Egypt.

To circumvent this Arab League boycott of Israel, the Israeli immigration services have now mostly ceased to stamp foreign nationals' passports on either entry to or exit from Israel (unless the entry is for some work-related purposes). Since 15 January 2013, Israel no longer stamps foreign passports at Ben Gurion Airport. Passports are still (as of 22 June 2017) stamped at Erez when passing into and out of Gaza.

Iran refuses admission to holders of passports containing an Israeli visa or stamp that is less than 12 months old.

=== Biometrics ===
Several countries mandate that all travellers, or all foreign travellers, be fingerprinted on arrival and will refuse admission to or even arrest travellers who refuse to comply. In some countries, such as the United States, this may apply even to transit passengers who merely wish to change planes rather than go landside.

Fingerprinting countries/regions include Afghanistan, Argentina, Brunei, Cambodia, China, Ethiopia, Ghana, Guinea, India, Japan, Kenya (both fingerprints and a photo are taken), Malaysia upon entry and departure, Mongolia, Saudi Arabia, the Schengen Area, Singapore, South Korea, Taiwan, Thailand, Uganda, the United Arab Emirates and the United States.

Many countries also require a photo be taken of people entering the country. The United States, which does not fully implement exit control formalities at its land frontiers (although long mandated by its own legislation), intends to implement facial recognition for passengers departing from international airports to identify people who overstay their visa.

Together with fingerprint and face recognition, iris scanning is one of three biometric identification technologies internationally standardised since 2006 by the International Civil Aviation Organization (ICAO) for use in e-passports and the United Arab Emirates conducts iris scanning on visitors who need to apply for a visa. The United States Department of Homeland Security has announced plans to greatly increase the biometric data it collects at US borders. In 2018, Singapore began trials of iris scanning at three land and maritime immigration checkpoints.

== See also ==
- Visa policy of Iraq
- Iraqi passport
- Foreign relations of Iraq
