= Iraqi passport =

Passport issued to citizens of the Republic of Iraq

Iraqi passport جواز السفر العراقي (Arabic) پاسپۆرتی عێراقی (Kurdish)
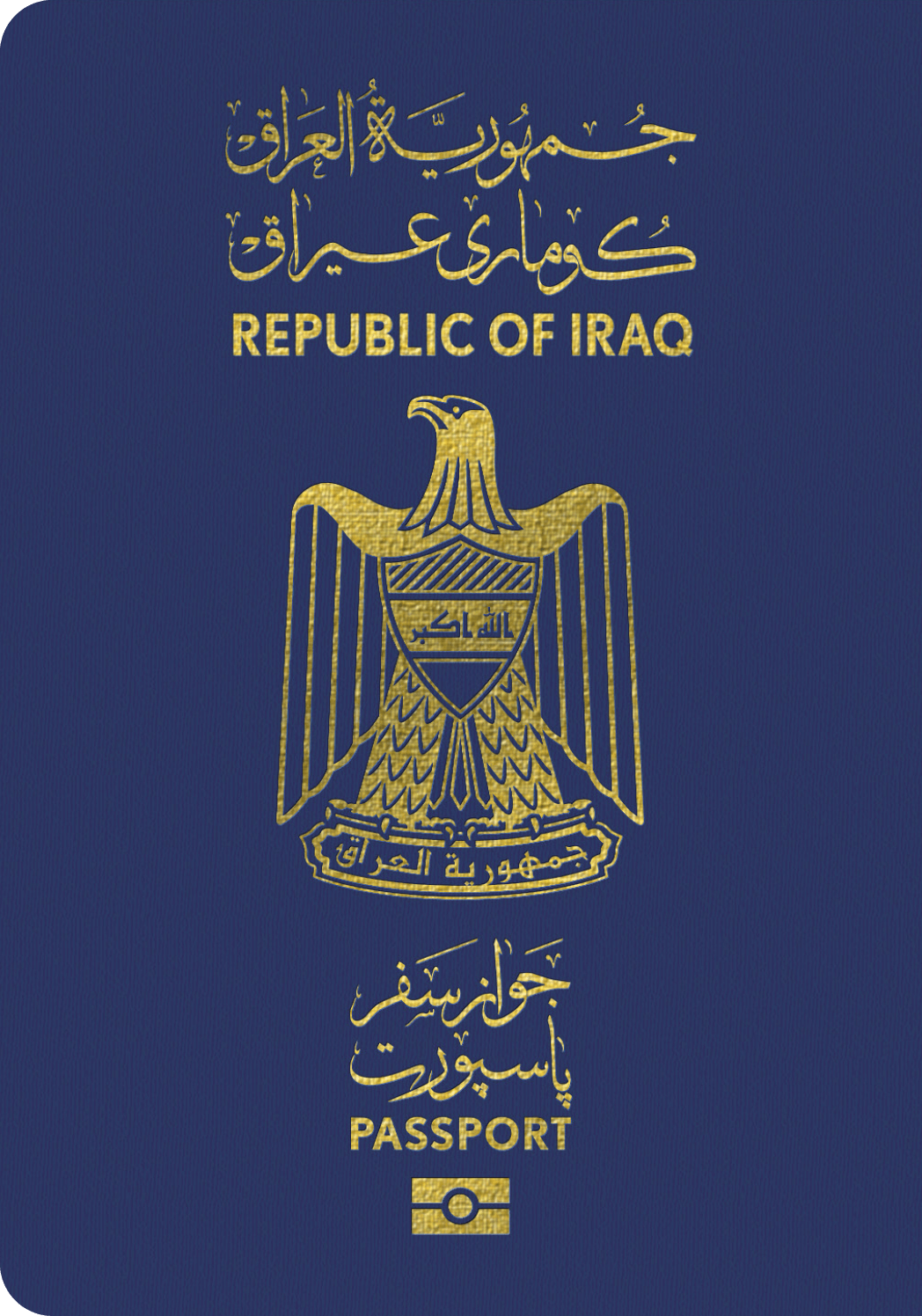
- Front cover of a contemporary Iraqi biometric passport, issued since 2023

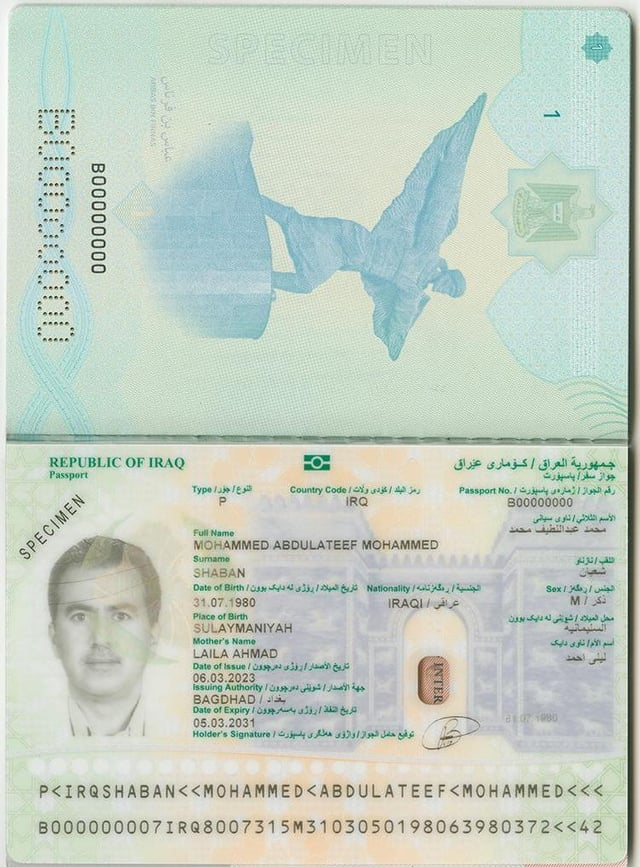
- Data page of the B-series Iraqi passport
- Type: Passport
- Issued by: Ministry of Interior of Iraq
- First issued: 9 January 2023 (biometric passport)
- Purpose: Identification
- Eligibility: Iraqi citizenship
- Expiration: 8 years after issuance, or 4 years after issuance for citizens under the age of 16
- Cost: IQD 91,000 (first/renewal)

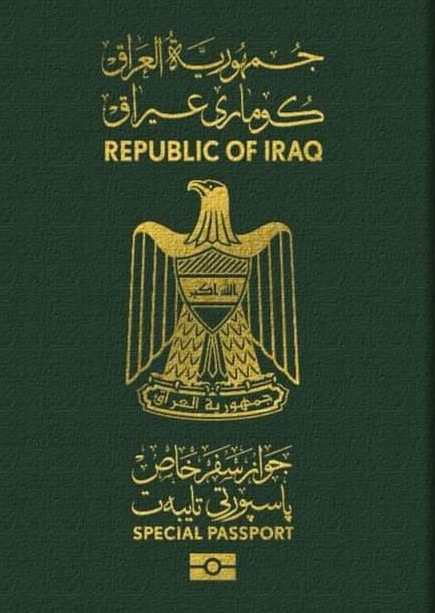
Cover of an Iraqi Special passport 2023-

The Iraqi passport (Note: Arabic: جواز السفر العراقي; Kurdish: پاسپۆرت عێراقی) is the travel document issued to citizens of the Republic of Iraq for the purpose of international travel. As of 9 January 2023, a new ICAO approved, biometric passport is being issued. Previous series issued by passport offices in Iraq and diplomatic representatives worldwide include the "S", non-machine-readable series and the "G" series.

== History ==
The previous A-series passports have been issued since 1 October 2009 (German embassy in Jordan, 2009). Passports in the G-series are thus no longer issued, but they are still valid until their expiry date. However, in autumn 2014, a document expert at a Western embassy in Amman informed Landinfo (meeting in Amman, November 2014) that the Iraqi authorities were still issuing G-series passports. This means that real G-series passports issued after 2009 may be in circulation. A-series passports differ from G-series passports in that they contain text in Arabic, Kurdish and English. There is also a difference on the page containing personal data – G-series passports have a field for the passport holder's signature or fingerprints, while in A-series passports, this field has been replaced by a bar code. The page containing biometric data is laminated, as it was in the G-series. The passport holder's signature is on page 3 in the passport. A-series passports have 48 pages and are valid for eight years. The passport number is perforated through the bottom of each page starting from page 3. Pages 4–48 are visa pages. All A-series passports are personal. Children must have their own passport.

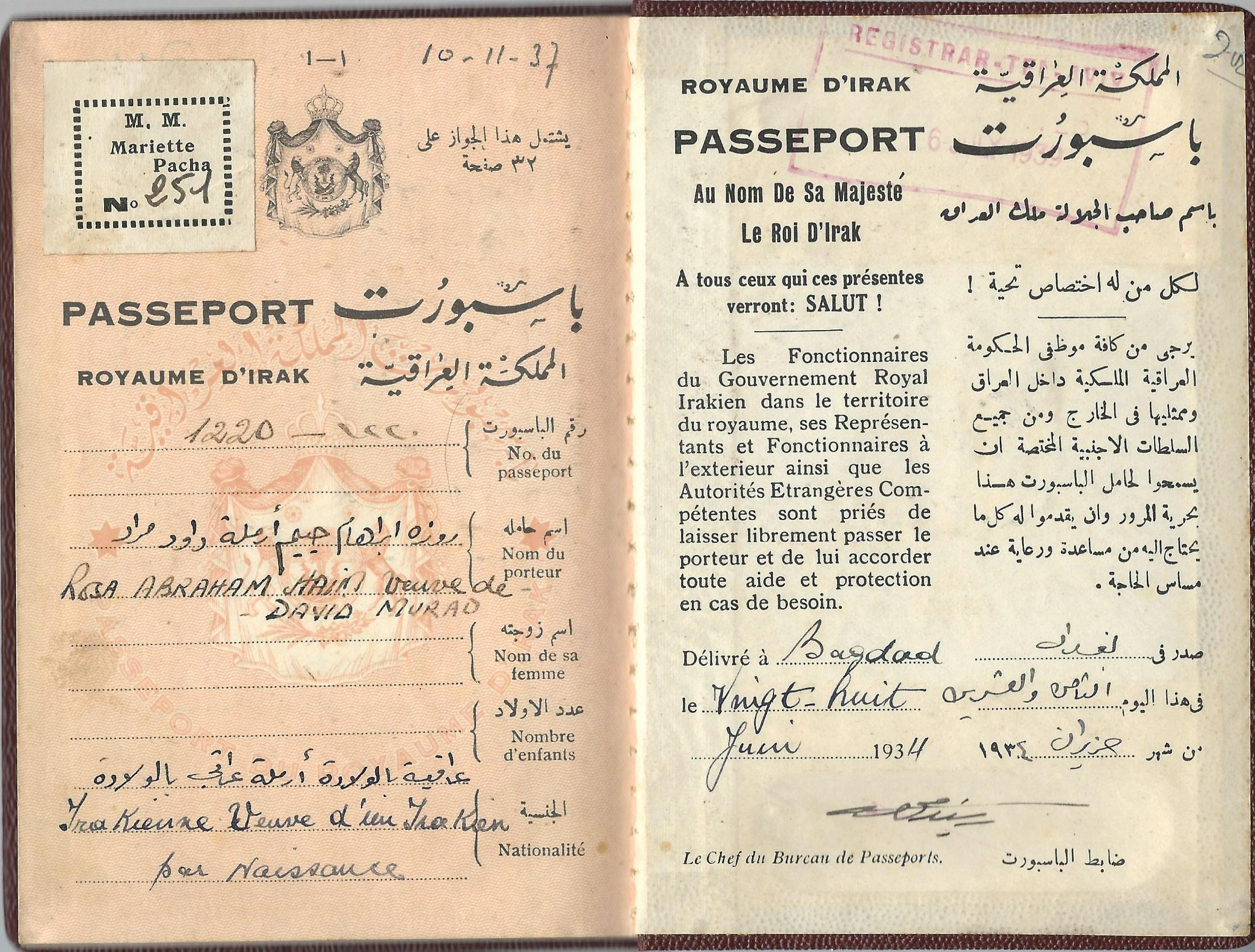
1934 Iraqi passport used up to 1939 for Europe and British Palestine.

== Types ==
There are four different passport types.

- Regular passport (dark blue cover) – Issued to all citizens of the Republic of Iraq. It is valid for four or eight years depending on the age of the passport applicant/holder. Those passports are not extendable or renewable and a new one must be obtained once expired.
- Diplomatic passport (ruby cover) – Issued to Iraqi diplomats accredited overseas and their eligible dependents, and to citizens who reside in the Republic of Iraq and travel abroad for diplomatic work. Title and function of the bearer (diplomat) is listed on the data page of the Diplomatic Passport in addition to the information already contained. It is valid for five years.
- Service passport (dark red cover) – Issued to citizen-employees of the Republic of Iraq assigned overseas, Iraqi Government employees working at the Ministry of Foreign Affairs or at the Iraqi Diplomatic Mission assigned abroad. Official Passports can be issued to other government officials that are to travel abroad, with prior approval, as well as to their spouses and children living in the same household. Title and function of the bearer (official) is listed on the data page of the Official Passport in addition to the information already contained. It is valid for five years.
- Special passport (dark green cover) – Is issued to an Iraqi Citizen who needs to come back into Iraq; when issued it is valid for thirty days or until the return trip is completed and can be issued at an Iraqi Diplomatic Mission.

=== Series ===
Series	Issued From	Issued To	Valid for Travel
B biometric passport	9 January 2023	Present	Yes
A	1 February 2010	9 January 2023	Yes
G	2007	1 February 2010	No Since 1 February 2018
H	?	?	No since 31 December 2011
N	?	?	No since 1 January 2008
M	?	?	No since 31 December 2006
S	?	?	No since 1 September 2006

== Physical appearance ==
=== Languages ===
The new A-series passports differ from G-series passports in that they contain text in Arabic, Kurdish and English. There is also a difference on the page containing personal data – G-series passports have a field for the passport holder's signature or fingerprints, while in A-series passports, this field has been replaced by a bar code

=== Identity information page ===
The front page of the Iraqi passport includes the following data:

- Photo of passport owner
- Type of document (P = passport)
- Code for issuing country (IRQ = Iraq)
- Passport number (9 alphanumeric digits, chosen from numerals 0–9 and letters C, F, G, H, J, K, L, M, N, P, R, T, V, W, X, Y, Z. Thus, "0" denotes the numeral, not the letter "O".)
- Full Name
- Surname
- Date of birth
- Sex
- Nationality
- Place of birth
- Date of issue
- Date of expiry
- Authority that issued the passport
- Owner's signature

The page ends with a 2-line machine readable zone, according to ICAO standard 9303. The country code is IRQ as is the standard country code for Iraq (according to ISO 3166-1 alpha-3).

== Visa requirements ==
On January 18, 2018, Iraqi citizens had visa-free or visa on arrival access to 28 countries and territories, ranking the Iraqi passport 104th in the world according to the Visa Restrictions Index.

Visa requirements for Iraqi citizens Iraq Visa-free Visa available both on arrival or online Visa on arrival eVisa Visa required Travel restricted

== Gallery ==
The front cover of a contemporary Iraqi Passport

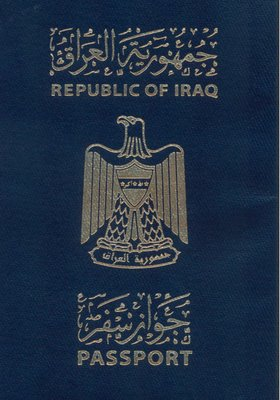
Cover of Iraqi Passport (1991-2003)

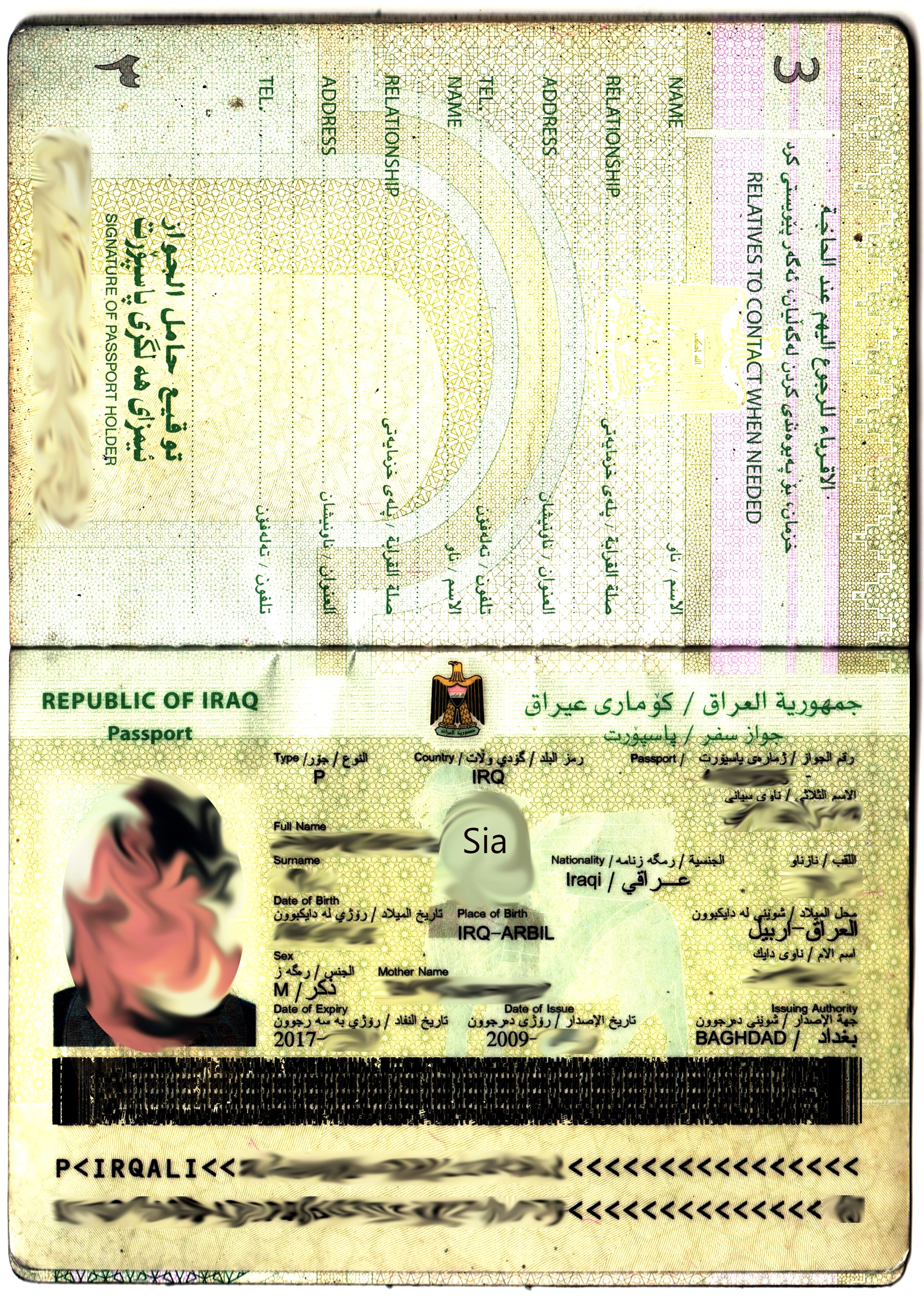
Information and signature page.

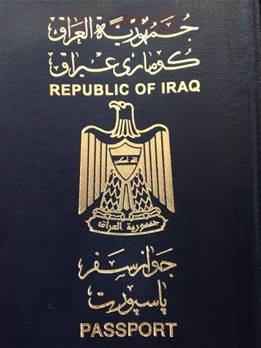
Front cover of Iraqi passport with Arabic, Kurdish and English.

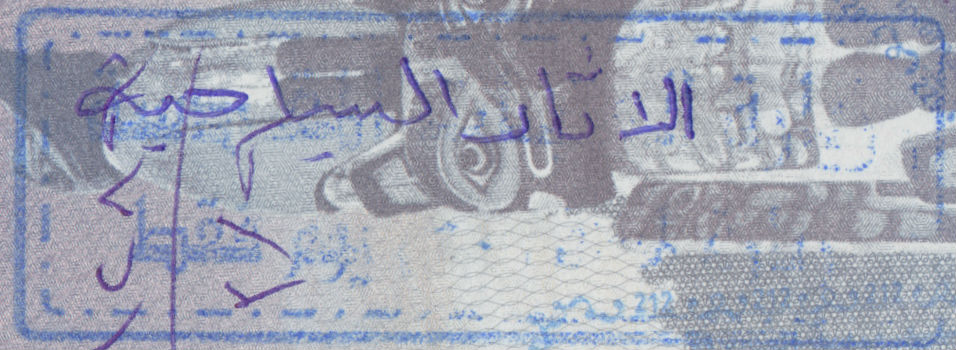
Iraq tourism visa from 2014. Visa on arrival.

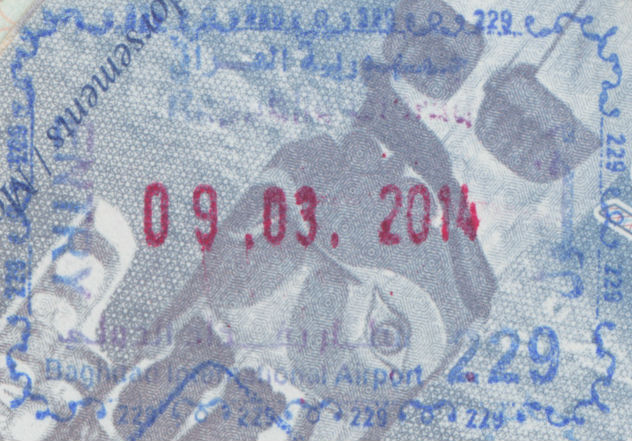
Iraq entry passport stamp from 2014 Baghdad International Airport.

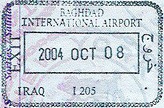
Iraqi exit stamp from 2004.

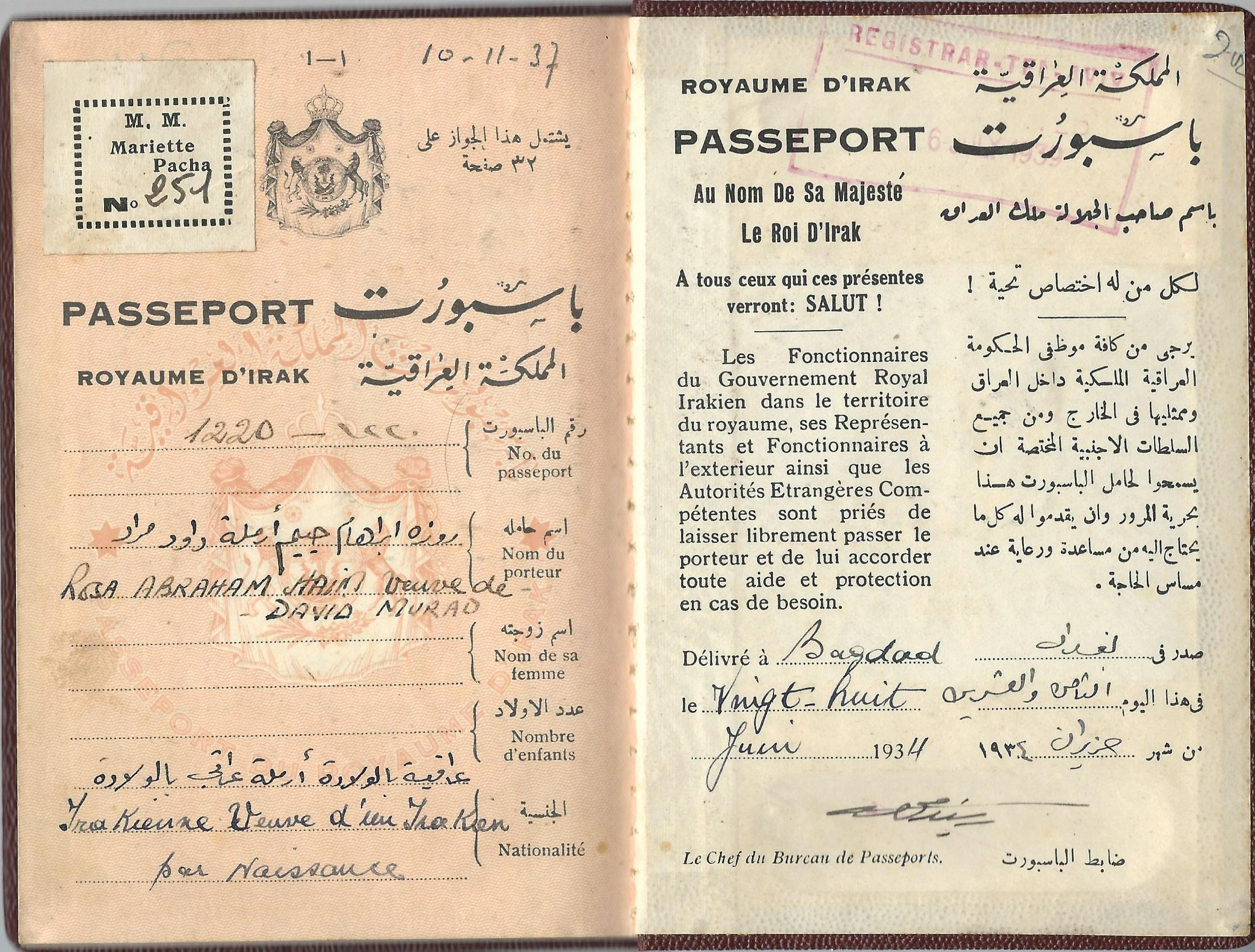
1934 Iraqi passport used up to 1939 for Europe and British Palestine.

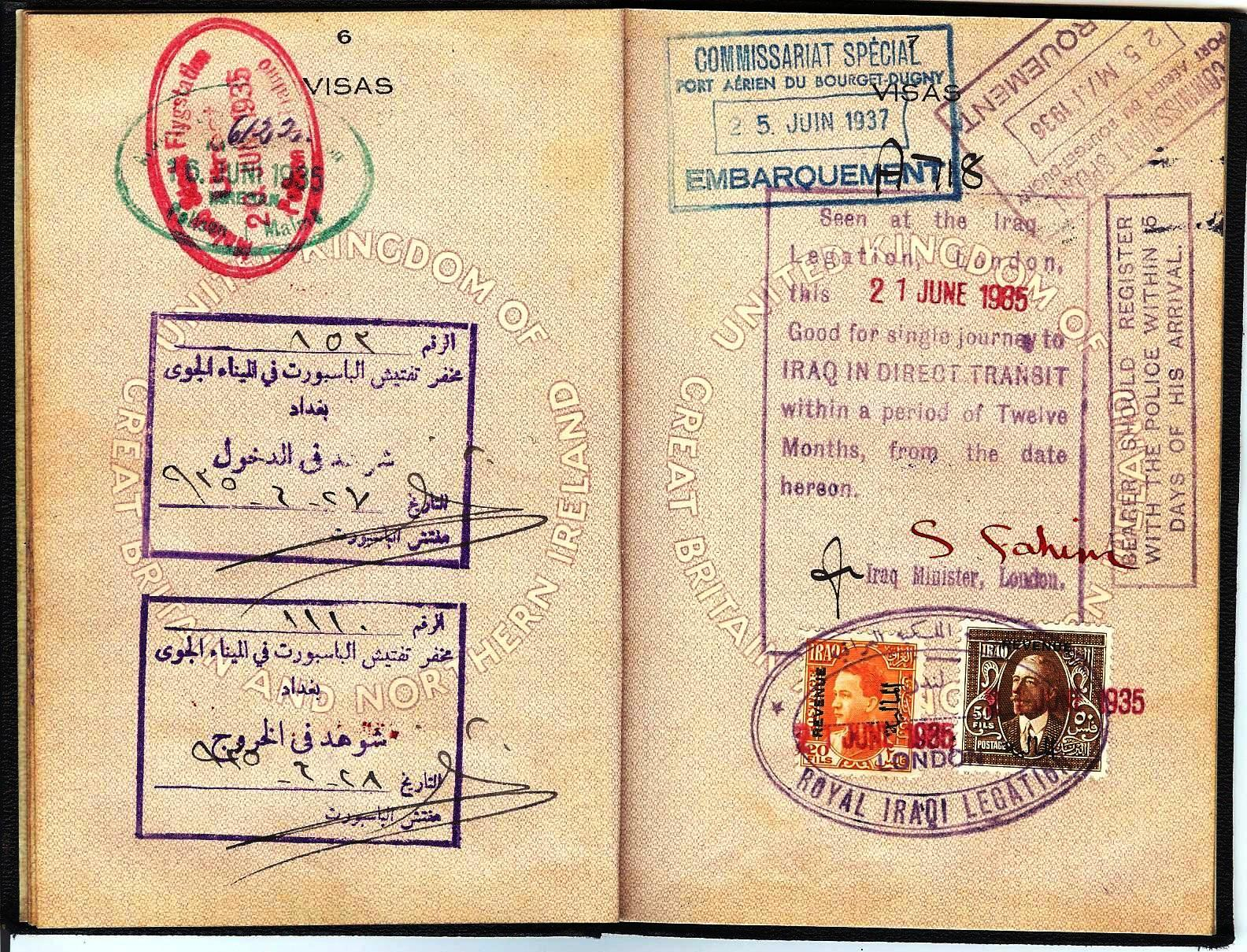
British Passport with Iraqi Visa from 1935.

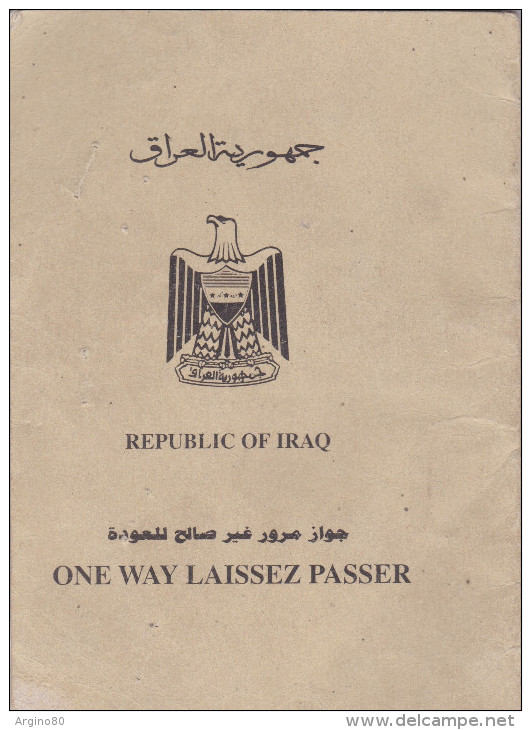
Iraq Republic passport from 2000 one way laissez-passer front cover.

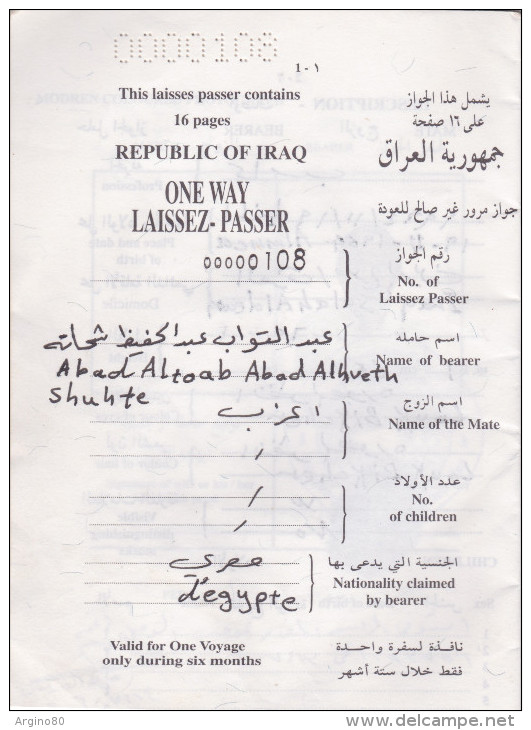
Iraq Republic passport from 2000 one way laissez-passer data page.

== See also ==
- Visa policy of Iraq
- Visa requirements for Iraqi citizens
- Iraqi nationality law
- Iraq National Card
