= Tourism in Iraq =

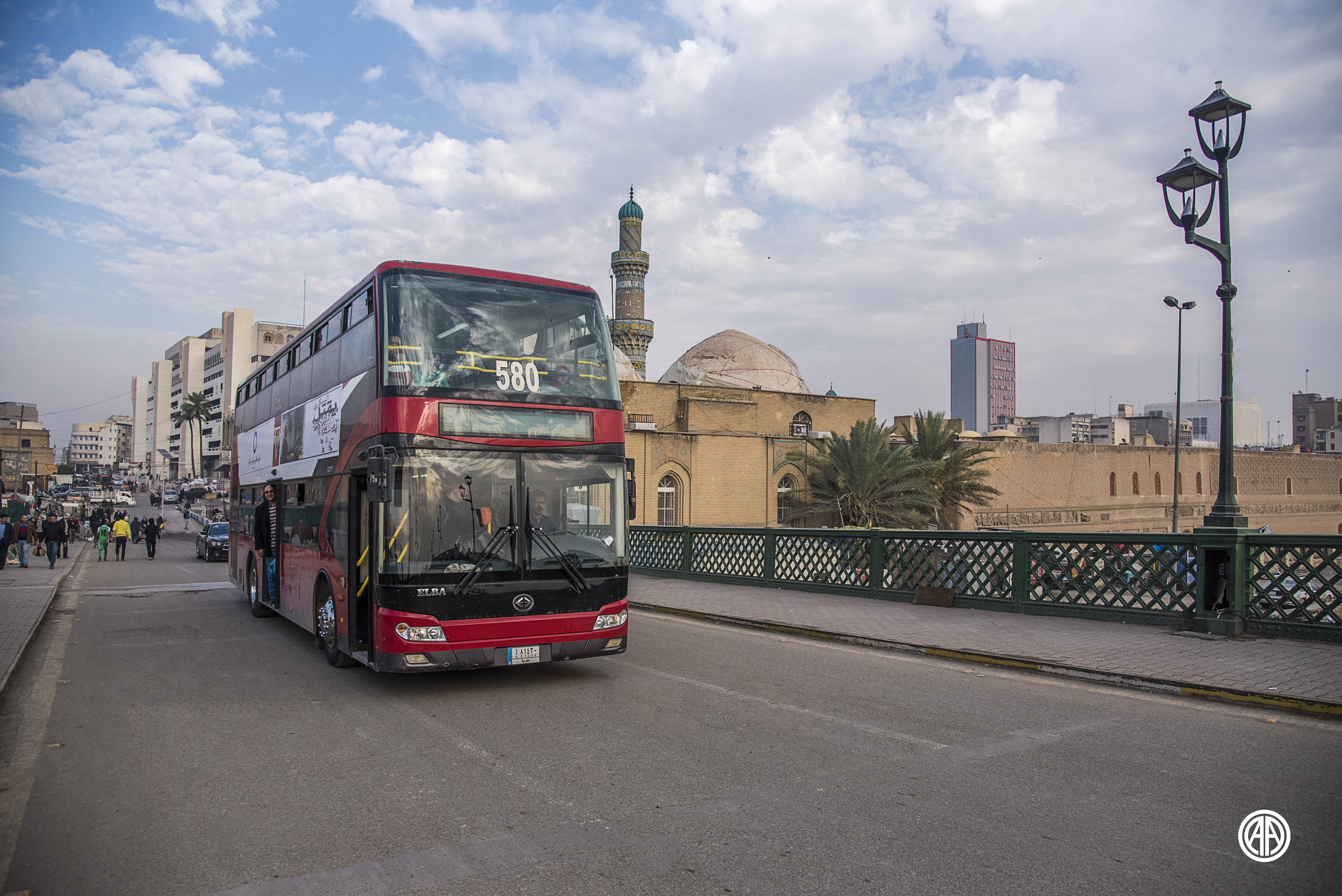
A tourist bus in Baghdad

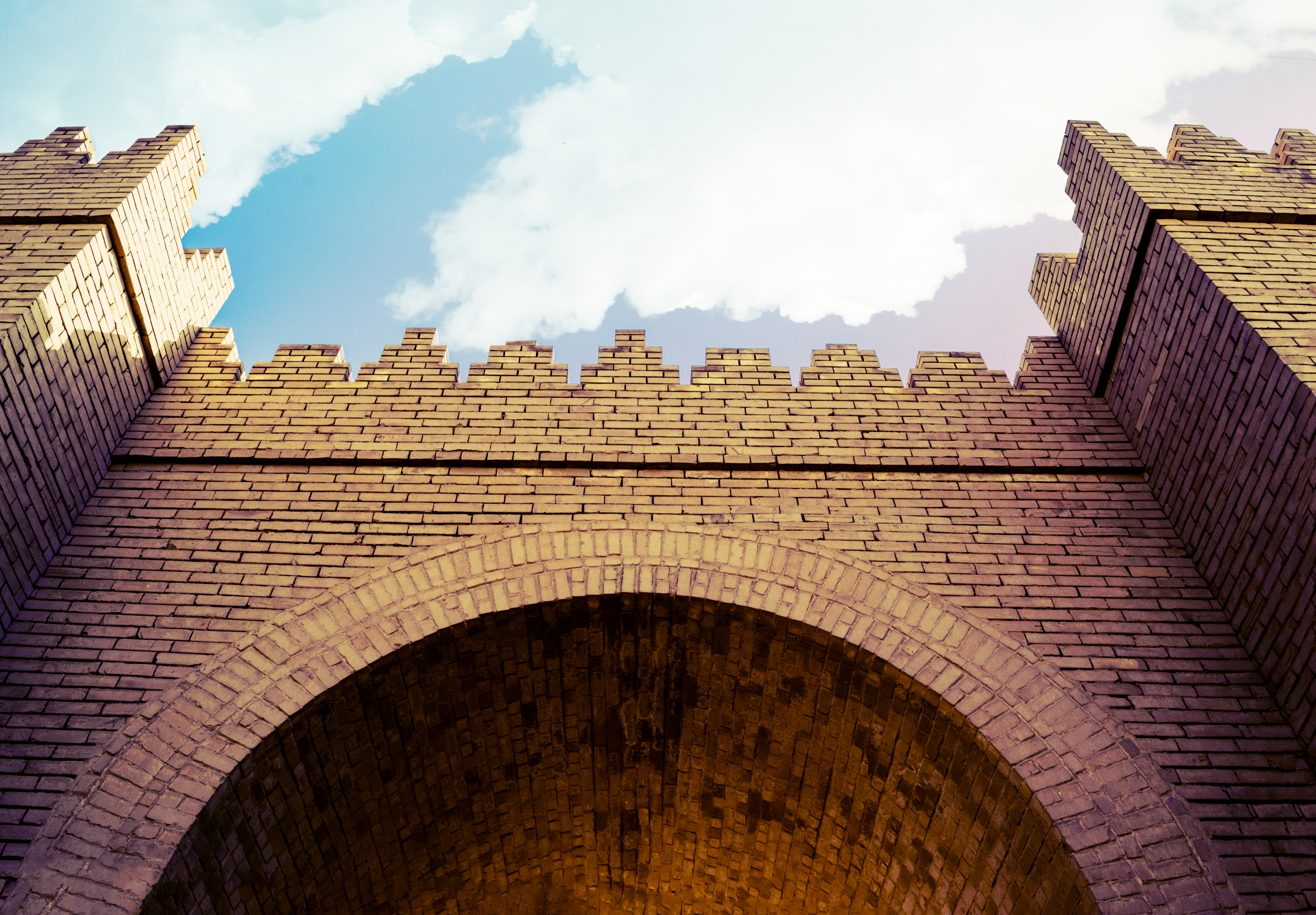
Babylon was inscribed by UNESCO as a World Heritage site and receives thousands of visitors each year.

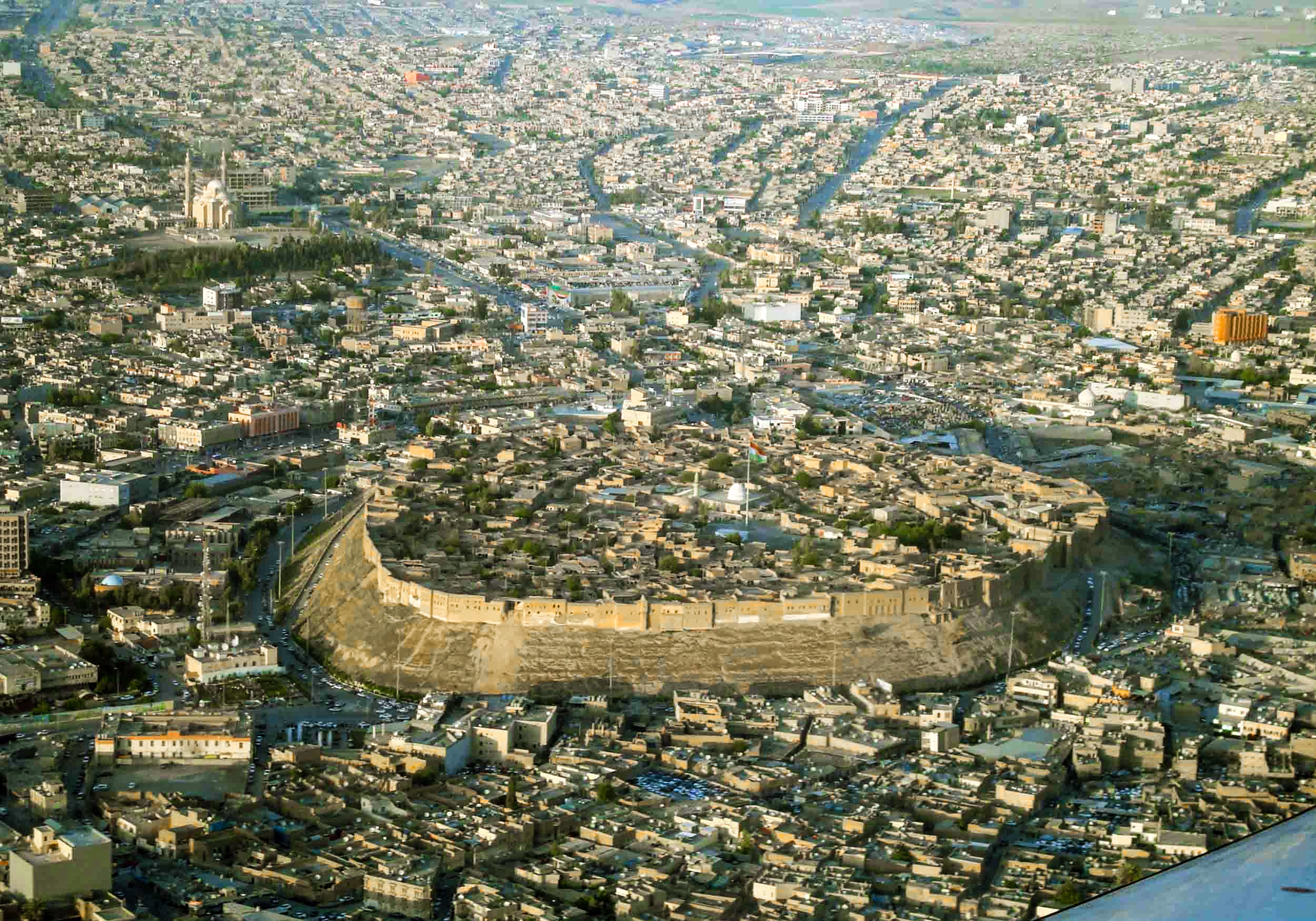
Aerial view of Erbil Citadel

Tourism in Iraq refers to tourism in the Western Asian country of Iraq. Iraq was one of the main destinations for many years, however this changed dramatically due to conflicts. Tourism in Iraq has faced many challenges, however, in recent years there have been improvements. The capital city Baghdad is the second largest city in the Arab world and the 4th largest in the Middle East. Iraq has several World Heritage Sites, dating back to ancient Mesopotamia, most notably Babylon Iraq. Iraq is considered to be a potential location for ecotourism.

Erbil was chosen as the "Arab Tourism Capital" for 2014 by the Arab Tourism Committee. Then, Baghdad was chosen as Arab Tourism Capital for 2025. Recent initiatives include the development of Ur Tourist City adjacent to the 4th-millennium BC city of Ur, designed as a religious and heritage tourism centre for the Sumerian archaeological site.

== World Heritage Sites ==
† In danger

| Site | Image | Location | Criteria | Area ha (acre) | Year | Description |
|---|---|---|---|---|---|---|
| Ashur (Qal'at Sherqat) | | Saladin Governorate35°27′32″N 43°15′35″E | Cultural: (iii)(iv) | 70 (170) | 2003 | Located on the Tigris and dating from the 3rd millennium BCE, Ashur was the first capital of the Assyrian Empire and the religious centre of the Assyrians. Following its destruction by the Babylonians, the city was briefly revived during the Parthian period. |
| Erbil Citadel | | Erbil Governorate36°11′28″N 44°00′33″E | Cultural: (iv) | 16 (40) | 2014 | Situated on the top of a tell in Iraqi Kurdistan and overlooking the city of Erbil, the Erbil Citadel constitutes a typical example of Ottoman-era urban-planning. In addition to its 19th century fortifications, the site also contains remains dating back to the Assyrian period. |
| Hatra | | Nineveh Governorate35°35′17″N 42°43′06″E | Cultural: (ii)(iii)(iv)(vi) | 324 (800) | 1985 | The fortified Parthian city of Hatra withstood repeated attacks by the Roman Empire in the 2nd century. Its architecture reflects both Hellenistic and Roman influences. |
| Samarra Archaeological City | | Saladin Governorate34°20′28″N 43°49′25″E | Cultural: (ii)(iii)(iv) | 15,058 (37,210) | 2007 | Located on the Tigris, the Islamic city of Samarra was the capital of the Abbasid Caliphate. It contains two of the largest mosques and several of the largest palaces in the Islamic world, in addition to being among the finest example of Abbasid-era town-planning. |
| The Ahwar of Southern Iraq: Refuge of Biodiversity and the Relict Landscape of the Mesopotamian Cities | | 31°33′44″N 47°39′28″E | Mixed: (iii)(v)(ix)(x) | 211,544 (522,740) | 2016 | Located in southern Iraq, the site contains three cities of Sumerian origin, namely Uruk, Ur and Eridu, in addition to four wetland areas in the Iraqi Marshlands. |
| Babylon | | Babylon Governorate 32°32′11″N 44°25′15″E | Cultural: (iii)(vi) | 1,054.3 (2,605) | 2019 | A former capital of Hammurabi, Babylon grew to become the largest settlement in ancient Mesopotamia during the reign of Nebuchadnezzar II. |

Additionally, Iraq has sites on the tentative list of UNESCO. The tentative list includes Ur, Nimrud, The Ancient City of Nineveh, The Fortress of Al-Ukhaidar, Wasit, The Marshlands of Mesopotamia, The Site of Thilkifl, Wadi Al-Salam Cemetery in Najaf, Amedy city, Historical Features of the Tigris River in Baghdad Rusafa. In addition to these sites, there are must-see places to visit in person in Iraq, like the Iraqi Plastic Society which houses numerous art work demonstrating traditional as well as innovative styles of design.

== Baghdad ==
Baghdad

Baghdad is the capital of Iraq and the second-largest city in the Arab world. It is located along the Tigris near the ruins of the ancient Akkadian city of Babylon and the Sassanid Persian capital of Ctesiphon. In the eighth century, Baghdad was chosen as the capital of the Abbasid Caliphate, and became its most notable major development project

== Religious tourism ==
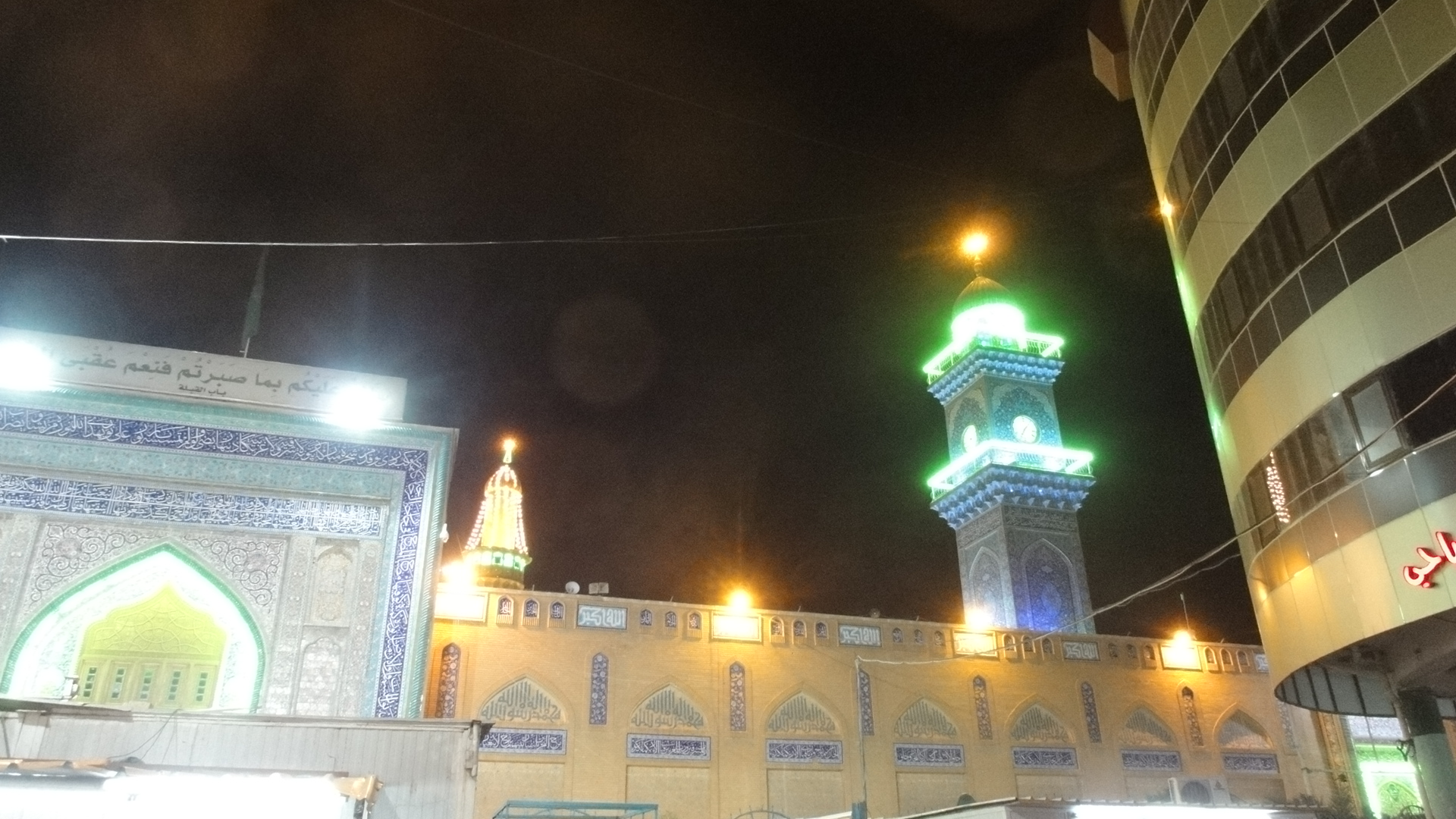
Al-Kadhimiya Mosque

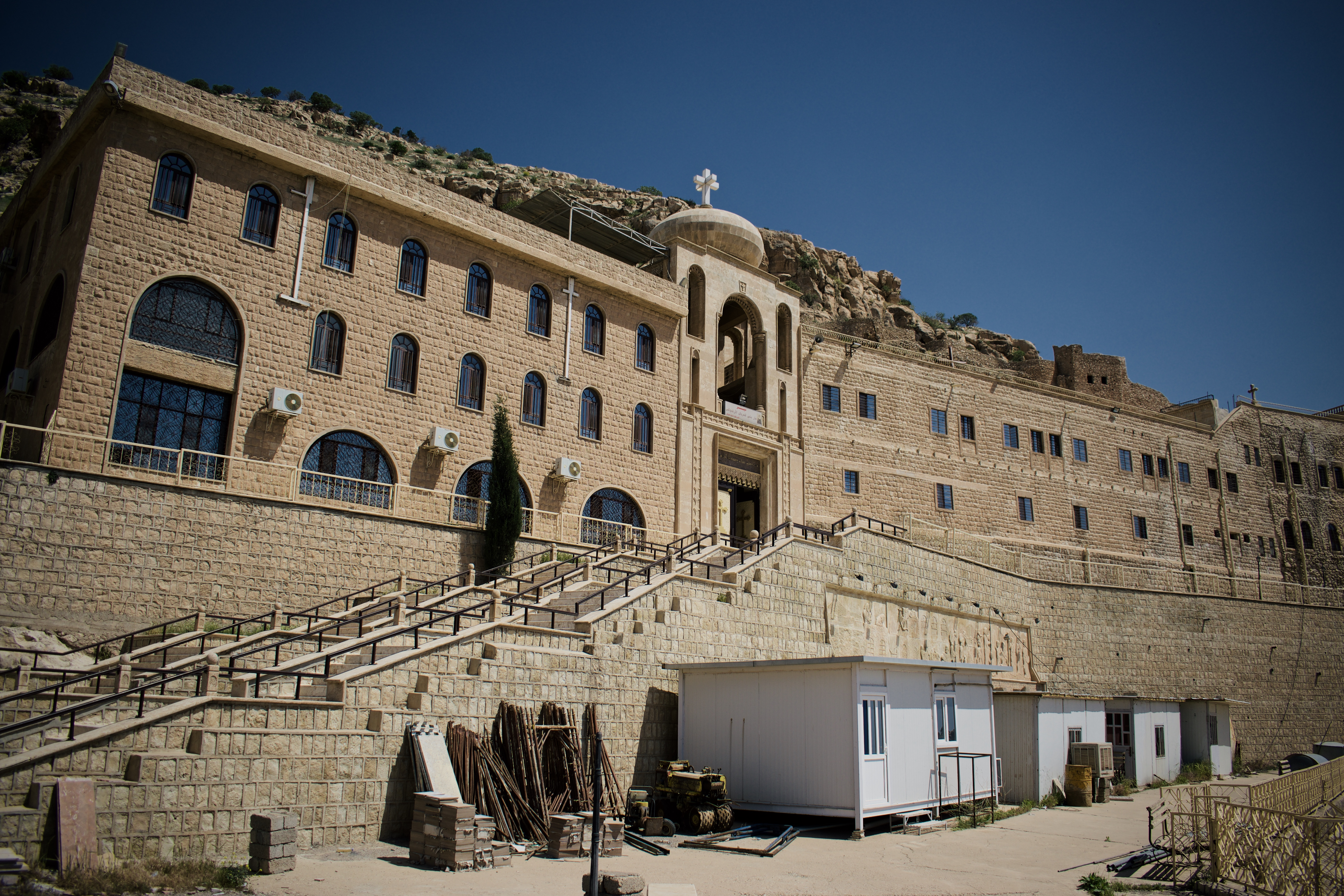
Mor Mattai Monastery in Nineveh Governorate

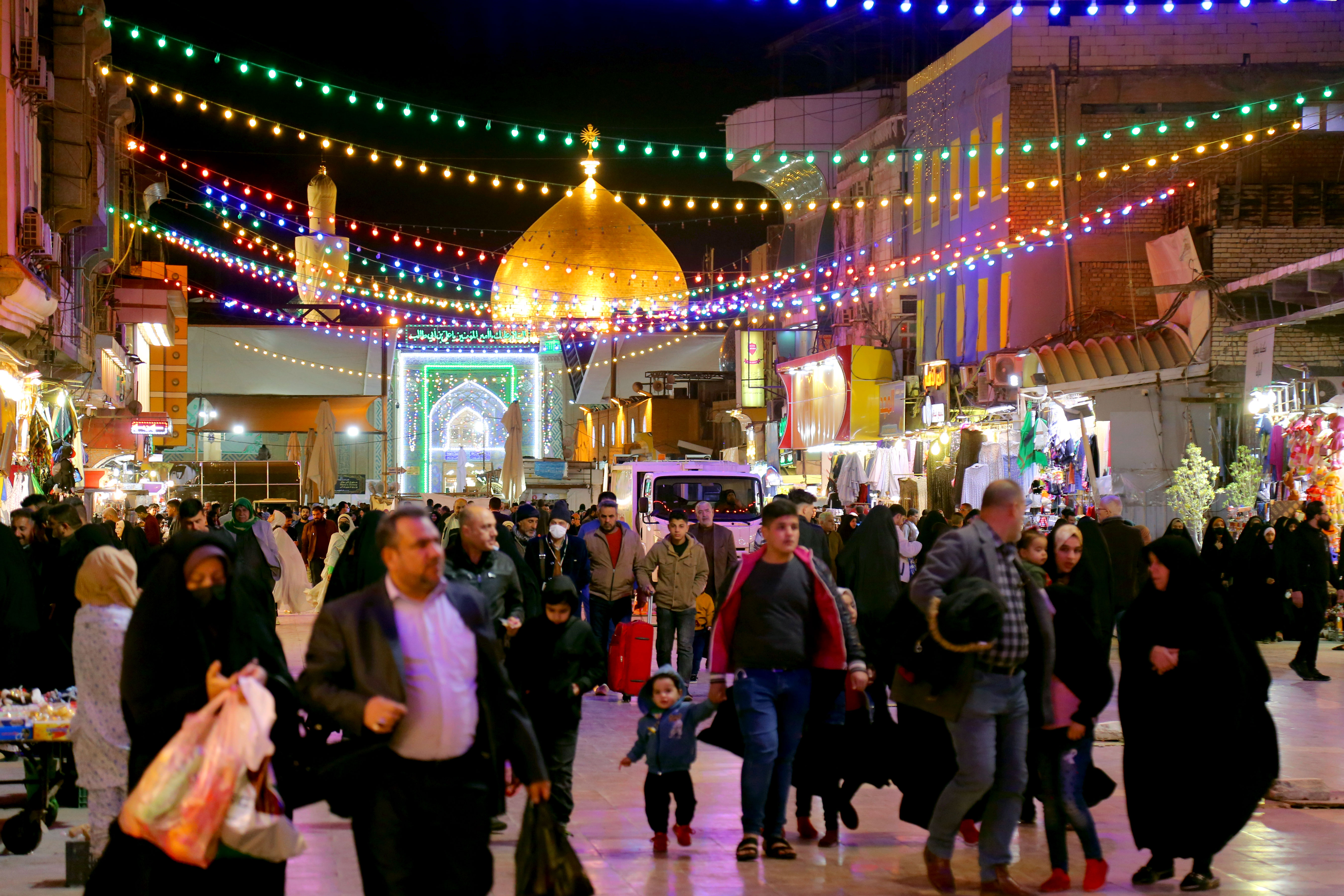
Imam Ali Shrine in Najaf

Religious tourism is the most popular type of tourism in Iraq, with tens of millions of tourists from several countries visiting Holy cities and places in Iraq every year. These include:

- Imam Ali Shrine in Najaf, with remains of Adam and Noah According to Shi'a belief.
- Imam Husayn Shrine and his brother Abbas ibn Ali in Abbas ibn Ali Shrine in Karbala.
- Al-Kadhimiya Mosque in Kadhimiya in Baghdad.
- Al-Askari Shrine in Samarra.
- The archaeological site of Ur near Nasiriyah, regarded as the birthplace of Abraham.
- Imam Dur Mausoleum, which is the tomb of Sharaf Ad-Dawla the Uqaylid Amir in Samarra
- Abu Hanifa's Shrine in Abu Hanifa Mosque, Baghdad.
- Abdul-Qadir Gilani's Shrine in Baghdad.
- Shrine of Al Nabi Yusha (Joshua) shrine in Baghdad.
- Maruf Karkhi Shrine in Baghdad.
- Shrine of Junaid Baghdadi and Sirri Saqti in Baghdad.
- Salman Al-Farsi Mosque in Al-Mada'in near Baghdad, containing tombs of three Sahabah and a descendant of Muhammad.
- Kumayl ibn Ziyad's Shrine between Najaf and Kufa.
- Hani ibn Urwa, Muslim ibn Aqeel & Mukhtar al-Thaqafi Shrines in Great Mosque of Kufa in Kufa
- Al-Sahlah Mosque in Kufa.
- Talhah shrine in Basra.
- Zayd ibn Ali Shrine in Babel.
- Hud (prophet) & Salih in Wadi-us-Salaam Cemetery in Najaf.
- Dhul-Kifl sanctuary in Hilla.
- Jonah, Seth, Saint George and Daniel sanctuary in Mosul.
- Uzair sanctuary in Amarah.
- Saad Ibn Aqeel Shrine in Tal Afar.
- Mosque of Arnā’ūt in Tal Afar.
- Sheikh Jawad Al-Sadiq Mosque in Tal Afar.
- Shrine and Mosque of Daniel in Kirkuk.
- Hamu Al-Qadu mosque at Mosul.
- Mashhad Yahya Abul Kassem at Mosul.
- Shrine of Al Muhsin at Mosul.

== Industry ==
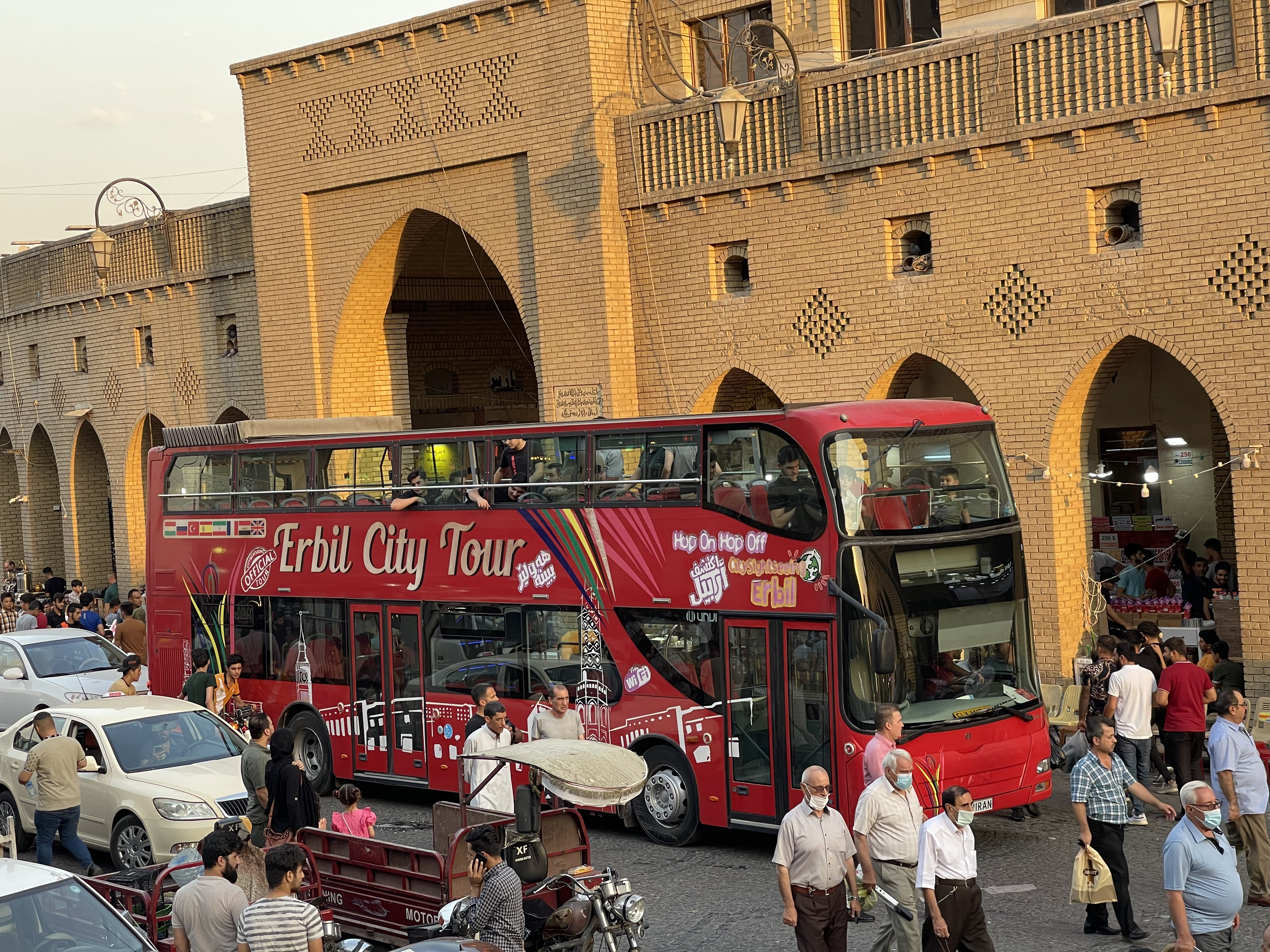
Erbil City Tour Bus

The number of tourist arrivals in Iraq in 2013 was 892,000. In the last two decades the highest number of tourists came in 2010 with 1,518,000 tourists. In 2012, the value of international tourism receipt was $1.64 billion. Iraqi Kurdistan, an autonomous region of Iraq, was a hotspot for tourism. It was considered to be a safe and stable region and least affected by terrorism. In 2012, Kurdistan recorded a 70% rise in tourist arrivals. In 2007 Kurdistan had 106 hotels which increased to 405 in 2012 in addition to 214 motels and 50 tourist villages. Erbil city in Kurdistan which was declared as "Arab Tourism Capital" in 2014. However, as of 2015, activities of the militant group ISIS have affected tourism in Kurdistan. According to the association of hotels, tourism in Kurdistan is going through a crisis. The Governor of Erbil said that the financial crisis of Iraq and the war against ISIS have affected all sectors of the economy including tourism.

Najaf and Karbala are considered a thriving tourist destination for Shia Muslims and the tourism industry in the city boomed after the end of Saddam Hussein's rule. However, due to the US sanctions on Iran, the number of Iranian tourists dropped significantly.

== See also ==
- Visa policy of Iraq
