= Iraqi nationality law =

Iraqi Citizenship Act

Parliament of Iraq
- Long title: An Act relating to Iraqi citizenship
- Enacted by: Government of Iraq
- Status: Current legislation

Iraqi nationality is transmitted by one's parents.

== History ==
The first nationality law was passed in 1924, and that year, on 6 August, all people within the bounds of Iraqi jurisdiction automatically acquired Iraqi citizenship. According to Zainab Saleh, "The 1924 Iraqi Nationality Law and its amendments bring to light the haunted origins of Arab nationalism" by defining Iraqis of Persian descent as second-class citizens.

== Naturalisation ==
The law governing naturalisation is Law No. 43 of 1963, Law No. 5 of 1975 and Law No. 26 of 2006. Naturalisation is only available to those over 18 years of age. There is a requirement of good repute, and a clean criminal record. Generally, the person seeking naturalization is required to have lived in Iraq for 10 constituent years or otherwise married to an Iraqi man for not less than 5 years with residence within the country. Naturalised citizens are required to take an oath of allegiance before a competent person authourised to receive the same within 90 days.

Naturalised citizens will be barred from holding the office of Member of Parliament or Minister for at least 10 years after the date of naturalisation. Additionally, naturalised citizens are unable to hold the office of Prime Minister of Iraq or President of Iraq.

== Dual citizenship ==
Iraq recognizes dual nationality.

== Travel freedom ==
Visa requirements for Iraqi citizens

In 2016, Iraqi citizens had visa-free or visa on arrival access to 30 countries and territories. Thus, the Iraqi passport ranks 102nd in the world, according to the Visa Restrictions Index.

== See also ==
- Nationality law
- Iraqi passport
- Iraq National Card
