= Iraq National Card =

National identity card of Iraq

National Card البطاقة الوطنية (Arabic) كارتى نيشتمانى (Kurdish)
- Type: Compulsory identity document
- Issued by: Iraq
- First issued: September 13, 2015
- Purpose: Citizenship and Identification
- Valid in: Iraq
- Eligibility: Iraqi citizenship
- Expiration: 10 years after issuance
- Cost: 6,000 dinar (first/renewal)

The Iraqi National Card is an biometric identity card issued by the Ministry of Interior from January 1, 2016. It replaced the Nationality Certificate and Civil Identification Document and the Residency Card. This card has a high security platform and is connected directly to the Iraqi Civil System, and can be used to travel within Iraq and Syria.

== History ==
The Ministry of Interior awarded Giesecke & Devrient the contract for this project on October 31, 2013. The National Card was first issued starting September 13, 2015, with plans to roll out each of the 190 districts of Iraq over a period of several years with the goal of issuing an ID card to every Iraqi citizen.

As of 2019, Veridos was supporting efforts to issue electronic ID (eID) cards to the remaining 0.15 million people in Iraq without a legal ID.

Iraqi

== Design ==
The new National Card is an ID-1 (credit card size) polycarbonate card with an embedded RFID chip. It is covered with multi-color guillochés. All the information on it is given in Arabic and Kurdish.

=== Front side ===
The front side shows the coat of arms of Iraq and the words "جمهورية العراق / Republic of Iraq", "وزارة الداخلية / Ministry of Interior" and "مديرية الجنسية العامة / General Directorate of Nationality". It contains the following information:

- Photo of ID card holder
- National identification number(12 decimal digits)
- Access number for RFID chip (9 alphanumeric digits)
- Given name
- Father's name
- Grandfather's name (paternal)
- Surname (only if holder has one)
- Mother's name
- Grandfather's name (maternal)
- Gender
- Blood type

=== Rear side ===
- Issuing authority
- Date of expiry (YYYY/MM/DD)
- Date of issue (YYYY/MM/DD)
- Place of birth (only the city/town of birth, no country)
- Date of birth (YYYY/MM/DD)
- Family number (18 alphanumeric digits)
- Machine-readable zone

=== Machine-readable zone ===
The MRZ is structured according to the ICAO standard for machine-readable ID cards.

==== First line ====
positions	text	meaning
1-2	ID	Identity Document
3-5	IRQ	issuing country: Iraq (IRQ)
6-14	alphanumeric digits	Access number for RFID chip (2 alphabetic digits + 7 decimal digits)
15	decimal digit	check digit over 6-14
16-27	decimal digit	document number (12 decimal digits)

==== Second line ====
positions	text	meaning
1-6	decimal digits	date of birth (YYMMDD)
7	decimal digit	check digit over 1-6
8	alphabetic digit	Gender (Male/Female)
9-14	decimal digits	date of expire (YYMMDD)
15	decimal digit	check digit over 9-14
16-18	IRQ	nationality of holder: Iraqi (IRQ)
30	decimal digit	check digit over 6-30 (upper line), 1-7, 9-15, 19-29 (middle line)

==== Third line ====
positions	text	meaning
1-30	alphabetic digits	GIVEN<NAME

Empty spaces are represented by "<".

== Security features ==
The identity card contains the following security features: It has an RFID chip.

== Cost ==
It costs 5,000 Iraqi dinars for a new card application, which is equal to US$4.

Description	Cost
issue 1st time / renewal	5,000 د.ع
replace broken or corrupt card	10,000 د.ع
replace lost card 1st time	25,000 د.ع
replace lost card 2nd time	50,000 د.ع
replace lost card after 2nd time	100,000 د.ع
update picture	1,000 د.ع
make correction or addition	1,000 د.ع

== See also ==
- Iraqi nationality law
- Iraqi passport
- Driving licence in Iraq
