= Nasiriyah International Airport =

- IATA: XNH; ICAO: none

Summary
- Airport type: Public
- Operator: Iraqi Government
- Location: Dhi Qar Governorate, Iraq
- Hub for: Iraqi Airways
- Focus city for: Nasiriyah, Iraq
- Interactive map of Nasiriyah International Airport

Nasiriyah International Airport (Arabic: مطار الناصرية الدولي) is an international airport located in Dhi Qar Governorate in Iraq, 18 km (11 mi) from the center of Nasiriyah city, and near the ancient city of Ur.

== History ==
In 2012, the Iraqi government approved the use of Imam Ali Air Base for civilian flights in Dhi Qar Governorate, and officially approved the establishment of Nasiriyah Civil Airport within the base. The civilian section of the airport was opened in 2017, and the first Iraqi Airways plane landed there on 10 March 2017. However, this airport remained without development or modernization. The airport administration was unable to modify or develop the airport, add new flights, or promote it well to attract the people of the governorate, who still prefer to fly through Basra International Airport for domestic or international flights. Therefore, the airport was closed.

=== Reconstruction ===
On 8 June 2021, the Iraqi government signed a contract with the China State Construction Engineering Corporation (CSCEC) to rehabilitate and construct Nasiriyah International Airport in Dhi Qar Governorate for $367 million. The airport will occupy 16 million square meters of land, with a building area of 2 million square meters. It will have a capacity of 750,000 passengers annually in its first phase and 2 million in the second. The airport will include a 100-room, four-story hotel, meeting and event halls, and restaurants. As of 2024, the project was 38% complete.

In January 2026, the Iraqi Ministry of Transport announced that the airport will open next March.

In August 2026, the Iraqi Ministry of Transport announced that the completion rate of Nasiriyah Airport had reached 68%, and said that it would be opened at the beginning of the following year.
