= List of World Heritage Sites in Iraq =

Location of World Heritage Sites in Iraq. Red dots represent cultural sites, while the blue dots represent the mixed site of The Ahwar of Southern Iraq.

The United Nations Educational, Scientific and Cultural Organization (UNESCO) World Heritage Sites are places of importance to cultural or natural heritage as described in the UNESCO World Heritage Convention, established in 1972. Iraq accepted the convention on 5 March 1974, making its historical sites eligible for inclusion on the list; as of 2019, six sites in Iraq are included.

The first site in Iraq, Hatra, was inscribed on the list at the 9th Session of the World Heritage Committee, held in Paris, France in 1985. Ashur (Qal'at Sherqat) was inscribed in 2003 as the second site, followed by Samarra Archaeological City in 2007. Erbil Citadel and The Ahwar of Southern Iraq were added to the list in 2014 and 2016, respectively, the latter being Iraq's first mixed property. Later on, Babylon was added in 2019. As of 2026, three of the five properties are placed on UNESCO's List of World Heritage in Danger. Ashur (Qal'at Sherqat) was added to the list in 2003, the same year it was inscribed as a World Heritage Site, due to concerns that a dam project might partially flood the site; while the project has since been put on hold, the site remains on the list as a result of the lack of protection. Similarly, Samarra Archaeological City was put on the list simultaneously with its World Heritage Site inscription in 2007, as authorities have been unable to adequately manage and conserve the site since the outbreak of the Iraq War. Hatra was inscribed on the list in 2015 due to its reported extensive destruction by the Islamic State of Iraq and the Levant.

== World Heritage Sites ==
World Heritage Sites
Site	Image	Location (governorate)	Year listed	UNESCO data	Description
Ashur (Qal'at Sherqat)		Saladin Governorate	2003	1130; iii, iv (cultural)	Located on the Tigris and dating from the 3rd millennium BCE, Ashur was the first capital of the Assyrian Empire and the religious centre of the Assyrians. Following its destruction by the Babylonians, the city was briefly revived during the Parthian period.
Erbil Citadel		Erbil Governorate	2014	1437; iv (cultural)	Situated on the top of a tell and overlooking the city of Erbil, the Erbil Citadel constitutes a typical example of Ottoman-era urban-planning. In addition to its 19th century fortifications, the site also contains remains dating back to the Assyrian period.
Hatra		Nineveh Governorate	1985	277rev; ii, iii, iv, vi (cultural)	The fortified Parthian city of Hatra withstood repeated attacks by the Roman Empire in the 2nd century. Its architecture reflects both Hellenistic and Roman influences.
Samarra Archaeological City		Saladin Governorate	2007	276rev; ii, iii, iv (cultural)	Located on the Tigris, the Islamic city of Samarra was the capital of the Abbasid Caliphate. It contains two of the largest mosques and several of the largest palaces in the Islamic world, in addition to being among the finest example of Abbasid-era town-planning.
The Ahwar of Southern Iraq: Refuge of Biodiversity and the Relict Landscape of the Mesopotamian Cities		Multiple sites	2016	1481; iii, v, ix, x (mixed)	Located in southern Iraq, the site contains three cities of Sumerian origin, namely Uruk, Ur and Eridu, in addition to four wetland areas in the Iraqi Marshlands.
Babylon		Babylon Governorate	2019	iii, iv (cultural)	A former capital of Hammurabi, Babylon grew to become the largest settlement in ancient Mesopotamia during the reign of Nebuchadnezzar II.

== Tentative list ==
In addition to sites inscribed on the World Heritage list, member states can maintain a list of tentative sites that they may consider for nomination. Nominations for the World Heritage list are only accepted if the site was previously listed on the tentative list. As of 2025, Iraq lists fifteen properties on its tentative list.

* Transnational site

Tentative sites
Site	Image	Location (governorate)	Year listed	UNESCO criteria	Description
Wasit		54 kilometres from the centre of Kut	2000	i, ii, iv (cultural)	
The Fortress of Al-Ukhaidar		50 kilometres south-west of Karbala	2000	i, ii (cultural)	
The Ancient City of Nineveh		410 kilometres north of Baghdad	2000	i, ii, iii, iv, v, vi (cultural)	
Nimrud		34 kilometres south of Mosul	2010	i, ii, iii (cultural)	
The Site of Thilkifl		Al Kifl	2010	i, ii, iii, iv, v, vi (cultural)	
Wadi Al-Salam Cemetery in Najaf		Najaf Governorate	2011	iii, v, vi (cultural)	
Amedy city		Kurdistan Region	2011	i, ii, iii, vii, viii (mixed)	
Historical Features of the Tigris River in Baghdad Rusafa, which extends from the school Al-Mustansiriya to the Abbasid Palace		Baghdad Governorate	2014	i, ii, iv, vi (cultural)	
Bestansur Neolithic settlement		Sulaymaniyah Governorate	2017	iii, iv (cultural)	
Nippur		Al-Qādisiyyah Governorate	2017	iii, vi (cultural)	
Old City of Mosul		Nineveh Governorate	2018	iii, v, vi (cultural)	
Lalish Temple	Conical roofs over the tomb of Şêx Adî in Lalish	Nineveh Governorate	2020	iii, vi (cultural)	
Kirkuk Citadel		Kirkuk Governorate	2021	iii, vi (cultural)	
The Hajj Pilgrimage Routes: The Darb Zubaydah*		Najaf Governorate	2022	ii, iv, vi (cultural)	
Archaeological site of Aqar Quf (ancient Dur-Kurigalzu)	A large, partially restored, brick building with a soldier in front	Baghdad Governorate	2025	i, ii, iii, iv, v (cultural)	

== See also ==
- List of Intangible Cultural Heritage elements in Iraq
- List of World Heritage Sites in the Arab states
