= List of Yezidi holy figures =

This is a list of holy figures (Kurdish: Xudan, Xas, Babçak, Mêr) in Yazidism.

There are a total of 365 Yazidi holy figures venerated by Yazidis. Many Yazidi tribes and lineages are named after Yazidi holy figures and there are many temples and shrines built in their honor. Holy figures in Yazidism are designated by various special terms including Babçak, Xudan (lord, master, owner, holder, proprietor, protector), Xas (selected, notable, special, elite) and Mêr which translates to (holy) man. According to Yazidi belief God is almighty and absolute, and the Xudans are a part of His power, moreover, in relation to nature, Yazidis believe in Xudans for most of natural elements and phenomena and they are regarded as divine powers that have control over these phenomena. In Yazidi mythology, the Xudans appeared after the creation of the world for the four elements of nature and their manifestations.

== Sheikhs ==
Below is a list of Yazidi holy figures belonging or associated with Sheikh caste:

=== Adanî ===
- Şêx Misafir, father of Şêx Adî
- Sitiya Ês, mother of Şêx Adî
  - Şêx Adî
    - Şêx Hesen (Şêxisin), Xudanê Qelemê (Master of the Pen), patriarch of the Adanî Sheikhs, member of the Heptad
      - Şêx Brahîmê Xetimî
      - Şêxê Êtîma
      - Şêx Mûsê Sor, Xudan of the air and wind
      - Şêx Şerfedîn
      - Şêx Zêndîn, associated with the totem animal hares and is considered their protector
      - Sitiya Gul

=== Qatanî ===
- Şêxûbekir, patriarch of the Qatanî Sheikhs, member of the Heptad
  - Şêx ʿEbdilqadir
  - Şêx Îsmaîlê ʿEnzelî
  - Şêx Kara
  - Şêx Maviyê Zar
  - Şêx Mehmedê Batinî
  - Şêx Sorê Sora
  - Şêx Xelîfeta

=== Şemsanî ===
- Êzdînê Mîr, patriarch and ancestor of the Şemsanî Sheikhs
  - Şêx Şems (Şêşims), member of the Heptad, Xudan of fire, light and sun
    - Amadîn (‘Emad ad-Dīn), son of Sheikh Shems; possesses curative powers over stomach aches
    - Şêx Bavikê Şemsa (Sheikh Babik), son of Sheikh Shems
    - Şêx Alê Şemsa, son of Sheikh Shems
    - Şêx Avîndê Şemsa, son of Sheikh Shems
    - Şêx Babadînê Şemsa, son of Sheikh Shems
    - Şêx Evdalê Şemsa, son of Sheikh Shems
    - Şêx Hesenê Şemsa, son of Sheikh Shems, Xatûna Fexra's husband
    - Şêxê Reş (Cinteyar)
    - Şêx Tokilê Şemsa, son of Sheikh Shems
    - Şêx Xidirê Şemsa, son of Sheikh Shems
    - Sitiya Îs/Ês, daughter of Sheikh Shems
    - Sitiya Nisret, daughter of Sheikh Shems
    - Sitiya Bilxan (Belqan), daughter of Sheikh Shems
  - Fexredîn, member of the Heptad, Xudan of the Moon
    - Şêx Mend, eldest son of Fexredîn who was ruler of Kilis emirate; Lord of Serpents
    - Xatûna Fexra, female saint, daughter of Fexredîn, wife of Şêx Hesenê Şemsa; patron of birth and pregnancy, and guardian of women and children
    - Şêx Bedir, son of Fakhraddin
    - Aqûb, adopted son of Fakhraddin
  - Nasirdîn, member of the Heptad, Angel of Death and Renewal, separates the soul from the body during a person's death, portrayed as an executioner and holder of a knife
  - Sicadîn, member of the Heptad, psychopomp and messenger of death, associated with the mouse as a totemic animal and hence also considered the protector of mice.

=== Other Sheikh figures ===
- Şêx 'Ebrûs/Hevruz (Xudan of thunder and lightning)
- Şêx Mişeleh (Xefûrê Rêya) protector of roads & patron of travellers, has shrines at Lalish and Ain Sifni.
- Şêx Bako. Has a shrine at Bahzani. The shrine is accompanied by a spring with a fig tree, which is visited by pilgrims with fevers. Pilgrims fasten small bits of their clothes on the tree and feed the fish in the spring.
- Şêx Kiras ("Lord Shirt"), Lord of revelations about spirits. Yazidis also speak of death and reincarnation as "changing one's shirt" ('Kirasguhartin').
- Şahsiwar/Şêx Suwar ("Lord of Horsemen"; Xudan of war and horsemanship). Has a shrine in Beban village.
- Şêx Mihemed. He had a wife named Sitt Hebîbe. Fought against "the great Sheikh" at Bashiqa. Buried near the monastery of Mar Gûrgîs in the Mosul area. His servant was buried at Bashiqa.
- Şêx Entûş/Hentûş/Întûz, one of Sheikh Adi's first disciples
  - Ebû ’l-Qasim, one of Sheikh Adi's early disciples. He was a son of Sheikh Hentûsh.
- Şêx Şelal. Possibly identified with Rumi.
- Sitt Hebîbe, Marta Hebîbta ("the Beloved Lady"), the wife of Şêx Mihemed. Has shrines near Bahzani and in Bashiqa.
- Sitî Hecicî/Xecîca, sister of Sitt Hebîbe and wife of Şêx Bedir
- Şêx ‘Eqîl Munejî/Sheikh Uqail al-Manbiji, one of Sheikh Adi's first disciples. Associated wirth Me'rûf el-Kerkhî. His name might have been derived from ‘Uqayl al-Mambijî.

== Pîrs ==
Below is a list of Yazidi holy figures belonging or associated with the Pir caste:

- Tawûsî Melek, Lord of this World and Leader of the seven Divine Beings. Only one angel is considered to be a Pîr by Yazidis; he is Tawûsî Melek and he is considered to be the "bavê Pîran" (Father of Pîrs) and the greatest Pîr, which is why he is considered to be a Pîr of all the Pîrs from Pîr Hesen Meman lineage, who in turn are considered Pîrs of the forty homes of Pîrs. Tawûsî Melek's name is seldom mentioned openly and he is instead called Pîr Melekê Elladî ('The Pîr Angel of the Best Religion'), Pîrê Batinî ('Concealed Pîr') and Pîrê Perdê (Pîr of the Veil) in religious texts.
- Pîr Hesen Meman, was one of the close associates of Sheikh Adi, Pir of the forty Pirs and the head of Pirs. According to the Yazidi tradition, he was the ruler of Harir near Erbil.
  - Hesen Elka
- Pîr Xetîb Pisî
- Pîr Afat, Xudan of floods, storms and natural disasters, invoked to protect human life and agricultural production from natural disasters, storms, floods or cold during winter
  - Mehmed Reshan (Mem Reshan), "the lion" and Lord of the Rains.
  - Pîr Derbês
- Pîrê Cerwan, Xudan of Scorpions. Subdivisions:
  - Pîr Îsêbiya ("Pîr Îsa ibn Abî"), one of the followers of Sheikh Adi and his Xezîndar (treasurer).
  - Pîr Hecî Mihemed
  - Pîr Omerxala, patriarch of the Mirebbî.
  - Pîr Qeḍîb el-Ban, a companion of Sheikh Adi
- Pîr Khanî. Traditionally had close ties with the Xaltî tribe in the Diyarbakir area of southern Turkey, with clan members now living in Ain Sifni in northern Iraq.
- Pir Ali (?)
- Pîr Sinî Daranî/Bahrî (Lord of the sea and son of a sea maiden)
  - Pîr Hecî ‘Elî, Haciyal, Hacalî
  - Pîr Bûb
    - Bûbê Qelender. Likely identified with Pîr Bub.
  - Pîr Fadil
  - Pîr Sedîq
  - Pîr Mend (?)
  - Pîr Buwal (?)
- Gavanê Zerzan (protector of cattle)
- Mem Şivan ("the Shepherd"), protector of sheep, he is represented in the bas-reliefs here with his crook and sheep.
- Pîrê Libnan, Xudan of weddings and family life, during the feast of Xidir Liyas and Xidir Nebî, Yezidis perform rites to ask Xidir Nebî as well as Pîrê Libnan about their wedding and happiness, according to oral tradition, Libnan constructed many places of pilgrimage, acquiring him the epithet of "the Pîr of building-blocks"
- Pîrê Ewra, Xudan of the Clouds, Yazidis venerate the clouds as the source of rain and snow in winter. Some Yazidis fast for one day in his honour.
- Pîr Dawud, a loyal servant of Sheikh Adi
  - Pîr Şeref, a descendant of Dawûd
- Pîrê Terjiman, Sheikh Adi's Arabic to Kurdish translator (since Sheikh Adi was born in Lebanon)
- Pîr Mehmedê Reben, has a shrine at Lalish, the current holder of the Baba Chawish position comes from his lineage
- Pîr Alû Bekr, possesses curative powers over mouth diseases. Has a shrine at Lalish.

== Other holy figures ==
Below are other holy figures, many of whom are considered to be Xudans of specific objects and functions.

- Derwêşê Erdê ("Dervish of the Earth"), Xudan of the Earth, invoked during sowing season and at burials, protector of property (In the past, when Yazidis left something valuable on the ground for a few hours, he was invoked to protect it)
- Baba Gûshgûsh, possesses curative powers over ear diseases
- Sitt Nefîse ("Lady Precious") possesses curative powers over fever and insomnia. Personification of a sacred fig or olive tree near Bashiqa.
- Feqire 'Eli
- Kanî Zerr/Kaniya Zerka, possesses curative powers over jaundice, personification of a spring. His name literally means "yellow spring."
- Melekê Mîran (Mêran), possesses curative powers over rheumatism
- Evdê Reş/'Ebd Resh ('Ebdî Resho), Xudan of springs. Some Yazidis fast on one day in his honor. He has shrines and holy springs in his honour at the villages of Kerabeg, Kendale and Dêrebûn.
- Bû Qetar Baba, representative of Sheikh Adi in the Mardin area, where a major shrine is dedicated to him
- Hekîm Fêris/Hekkî Fîres/Hakim Luqman, a descendant of Luqman. Patron saint of wounds, since his descendants cure wounds with herbs and medicines.
- Lakmadîn Baba, Sheikh Adi's secretary and guardian of his secrets.
- Se‘d and Mes‘ûd (or Se‘îd and Mes‘ûd, Mes‘ûd and Musey‘id). Mes'ûd’s shrine is near Bahzani, while the shrines of Mes‘ûd and Musey‘id are in Bashiqa.
- Dayka Jakan, Has a shrine near Bahzani.
- Xidir Liyas/Nebî, Xudan of water, streams and seas, in some Qewl passages, described as a Zindî (Immortal) and his place is the sea or seashore, therefore, he is described as having an eternal life, during the feast of Xidir Nebî and Xidir Liyas in February, Yazidis who are in love perform rites to ask Xidir Nebî as well as Pîrê Libnan about their wedding and happiness

== Holy figures of Abrahamic and Sufi background ==
In Yazidism, figures of Abrahamic or Sufi origin include:

- Shehîd ibn Jerr = Seth, the son of Adam and the progenitor of the Yazidis. His tomb and qubbe (conical spire) are at Bashiqa.
- Ibrahîm Khelil = Ibrahim (Abraham)
- Mûsa = Moses. Sometimes identified with Sheikh Fekhr el-Dîn.
- Behlûl, Behlûlê Dîn, Behlûlê Dîwane ("Behlûl the Mad") = Bahlool.
- Ebdilqadirê Gîlanî (Abd al-Qadir al-Gilani), a Sufi Sheikh who was a famous preacher and theologian. According to Yazidi tradition, he visited Şêx Adî to see the karamat, i.e wonders performed by him. Şêx Adî was one of the most respected dervishes and Ebdilqadir greatly appreciated and respected him. According to one version of Yazidi tradition, Şêx Adî and Ebdilqadirê Gîlanî first met at the site where the town of Shekhan is situated today, hence the name Shekhan which means "Two Sheikhs" in Arabic and takes its name from this encounter.
- Weys el-Qeneyrî = Owais al-Qarani. Has a shrine near Ba'shîqe.
- Rabi‘e el-‘Edewiyye = Rabia of Basra
- el-Hesen el-Beşrî = Hasan al-Basri. Identified with Sheikh Hesen.
- Bayezîd of Bisṭam = Bayazid Bastami
- Sheikh Menşûr el-Hellaj, Hisênê Hellaj = Mansur al-Hallaj. Has a shrine at Lalish.

== See also ==
- List of Yazidi holy places
- List of Yazidi tribes
- Yazidi social organization
- Yazidi literature
- Yazidism
- Yazidis in Lebanon
