= Yezidi literature =

Literature produced by the Yazidi people

Yazidi literature is literature produced by the Kurds-Yazidi people. Although Yazidi literature has traditionally been primarily oral, many Yazidi texts have been transcribed since the 1970s. Kurmanji is the main language used.

Unlike the other major religions of the Near East, Yazidism does not have a standardized canon of religious texts, since religious knowledge is traditionally transmitted orally.

Some of the largest text collections of Yazidi literature have been compiled by Philip G. Kreyenbroek and Khalil Rashow (2005) and Khanna Omarkhali (2017). Other compilations of various Yazidi texts are those of Christine Allison (2001) and Teimuraz Avdoev, a Georgian Yazidi.

== List of texts ==
This section contains a comprehensive list of Yazidi oral religious texts as compiled by Omarkhali (2017).

Yazidi oral religious poetry can be categorized into the following categories.

Poetic

- Qewl: considered to be of divine origin. The most important qewls are the Berane Qewls ("rams' qewls"), with just over a dozen of qewls typically considered as belonging to this category.
- Beyt: highly respected, but not considered to be of divine origin like the qewls
- Duʿa: prayers
- Qesîde: considered to have been composed by the disciples of Sheikh Adi
- Semaʿ
- Lavij
- Xizêmok (song of the "nose ring")
- Payîzok (song of "autumn")
- Robarîn (song of the "rivers")
- Xerîbo

Prose

- Mishabet ("sermon")
- Çîrok û Çîvanok ("narrative")
- Dastan ("tale")

=== Qewl ===
1. Qewlê Afrîna Dinyanê (Qewlê Afirandina Dinyayê, Qewlê Kinyatê) – The Hymn of the Creation of the World. One of the Berane Qewls.
2. Qewlê Aqûb û Mûsa
3. Qewlê Asasê – The Hymn of the Basis
4. Qewlê Aşê Muhbetê – The Hymn of the Mill of Love. Attributed to Pîr Reşê Heyran.
5. Qewlê Axiretê (Qewlê Sibêyek ji yêt ʿEdewiye, Qewlê Nefs û Aqil) – The Hymn of the Judgement Day
6. Qewlê Axiretê – The Hymn of the Judgement Day. Has its own melody.
7. Qewlê Bav Bekirê Omera – The Hymn of Bav Bekirê Omera. Attributed to Babekrê Omera yê Zerzayî. Has its own melody.
8. Qewlê Baza
9. Qewlê Bedir û Mend – The Hymn of Bedir and Mend. Has its own melody.
10. Qewlê Bedîla Sineʿt Kamil
11. Qewlê Bedîla Xedara (Qewlê Du Şax) – The Hymn of the Cruel Epoch. Sometimes considered to be one of the Berane Qewls.
12. Qewlê Behra (Qewlê Beʿra) – The Hymn of the Ocean. Usually recited during pilgrimages (ziyaret), and sometimes also during funerals.
13. Qewlê Beʿra – The Hymn of the Ocean. Has its own melody.
14. Qewlê Beygoya (Qewlê Bêgoya) – The Hymn of the False Accuser. Attributed to Sheikh Fexir or Derwêş Qatan
15. Qewlê Bêgoya – The Hymn of the False Accuser
16. Qewlê Bê û Elîf – The Hymn of B and A. One of the Berane Qewls.
17. Qewlê Birahîmê kurê Mihemmed
18. Qewlê Birahîm Xelîl
19. Qewlê Bore-borê
20. Qewlê Borêt Feqîra – The Hymn of the Horses of the Feqîrs. Attributed to Sheikh Mend.
21. Qewlê Cêma Cimleta (Qewlê Civat û Cimlete) – The Hymn of the Gathering of the Community
22. Qewlê Cimcimî Siltan – The Hymn of the Skull of the King
23. Qewlê Cirgîn
24. Qewlê Civatê – The Hymn of the Community. Attributed to Pîr Reşê Heyran.
25. Qewlê Çakê Me li Ser de – The Hymn of our Goodness with it. Attributed to Pîr Reşê Heyran.
26. Qewlê Çarşema Sor (Beyta Çarşemê, Qewlê Çarşembûyê) – The Hymn of the Red Wednesday. Attributed to Sheikh Fexir. Has its own melody. Recited when starting fires at sacred sites in the Lalish valley before the New Year Feast in April.
27. Qewlê Çî Sibeyeke Tarî Ye – The Hymn of What a Dark Morning It Is
28. Qewlê Daîk û Baba (Qewlê Day û Baba) – The Hymn of the Parents. Attributed to Sheikh Fexir. Sometimes considered to be one of the Berane Qewls.
29. Qewlê Denûn Misrî – The Hymn of Dhu-Nun from Egypt. Has its own melody (same as Qewlê Derwêş Adam).
30. Qewlê Dewrêşa
31. Qewlê Derwêş Adem (Qewlê Derwêş Adem û Mîr Brahîm) – The Hymn of Derwêş Adam. Has its own melody (same as Qewlê Denûn Misrî).
32. Qewlê Dewrêş Hebîb – The Hymn of Derwêş Hebib. Has its own melody.
33. Qewlê di ʿEmrekî da Mame – The Hymn I Remained in a Life
34. Qewlê Diol û Aqil
35. Qewlê Distrême
36. Qewlê Dota Qadiyê Besrayê (Qewlê Dota Qaziyê Besrayê)
37. Qewlê Dota Qaziyê Besrayê
38. Qewlê Dura
39. Qewlê Du Şax
40. Qewlê ʿErd û ʿEzman – The Hymn of Earth and Sky. One of the Berane Qewls.
41. Qewlê Erkanê
42. Qewlê Êzdîdê Mezin (Qewlê Ser Behrê) – The Hymn of a Great Êzîd
43. Qewlê Êzdînê Mîr (Qewlê Sê Kasanî Mest im) – The Hymn of Êzdînê Mîr. Has its own melody.
44. Qewlê Êzîd (Qewlê Êzdîd, Qewlê Makê, Qewlê Mezin) – The Hymn of Êzîd. Attributed to Pisê Cem. Has 3 melodies. Often considered to be the longest Yazidi hymn. Recited during the Tawûs gêran ("touring of Tawus").
45. Qewlê Êzîd û Medehê (Qewlê Ji Sultan Êzdî Didim Medehê) – The Hymn of Êzîd and Praising. Has its own melody.
46. Qewlê ʿEzmer Feqîn
47. Qewlê Firwara Melik Şêx Sin – The Hymn of the Order of the Angel Sheikh Sin (Şêxisin). Has its own melody.
48. Qewlê Firwara Mûsa (Qewlê Mûsa, Qewlê Nebî Mûsa)
49. Qewlê Firwara Şêx Fexir – The Hymn of the Order. Attributed to Sheikh Fexir. Has its own melody. Recited at funerals.
50. Qewlê Firwarê (Qewlê Firwara Şêx Fexir, Qewlê Melek Fexredîn) – The Hymn of the Order
51. Qewlê Gay û Masî – The Hymn of the Fish and Bull. One of the Berane Qewls.
52. Qewlê Gelya Marî
53. Qewlê Gêla Çar Ziman – The Hymn of the Lad of four languages. Attributed to Sheikh Fexir. Has its own melody.
54. Qewlê Gêla Şêx Mend – The Hymn of the Lad Sheikh Mend
55. Qewlê Hemedê Babê
56. Qewlê Herê Berê Ko Bû – The Hymn of Where was [the King] at First? Sometimes considered to be one of the Berane Qewls.
57. Qewlê Hesedê Al-Tewrî – The Hymn of Hesedê el-Tewrî. Attributed to Hesedê el-Tewrî.
58. Qewlê Hesenê Celê (Hesenê Çelê) – The Hymn of Hesenê Çelê. Has its own melody.
59. Qewlê Hevsarî (Qewlê Hefsarî) – The Hymn of the Bridle
60. Qewlê Hey Canê (a part of Qewlê Makê)
61. Qewlê Hezar û Yek Nav (Qewlê Hezar û Êk Nav) – The Hymn of the Thousand and One Names. Attributed to Sheikh Fexir.
62. Qewlê Hindav de Çûme Banî – The Hymn of I Rose to the Top
63. Qewlê Husêyînî Helac (Qewlê Helacê Mensûr, Qewlê Hisênê Helac) – The Hymn of the Hussein Hallaj. Has its own melody.
64. Qewlê Îmanê (Qewlê Îmanê Bi Çi Nîşane, Qewlê Nasridîn) – The Hymn of the Belief. Attributed to Sheikh Fexir. Has its own melody (same as Qewlê Xudanê Malê).
65. Qewlê Ji Şamê Têm Meclisê – The Hymn of from Syria/Damascus I Come to the Gathering. Attributed to Sheikh Fexir.
66. Qewlê Kasa
67. Qewlê Keniya Mara (Şîxadî Şêxê Şara) – The Hymn of the Laughter of Snakes
68. Qewlê Koçeka – The Hymn of Koçeks. Has its own melody.
69. Qewlê Kofa (Qewlê Pîrê Libnana, Qewlê Dilê Min î bi Kovan e) – The Hymn of the Headdress. Attributed to Dawidî bin Derman. Has its own melody (2 melodies).
70. Qewlê Lawê Pîran (Qewlê Lawikê Pîran) – The Hymn of Lawikê Pîran. Attributed to Lawikê Pîr. Has its own melody. One of the Berane Qewls.
71. Qewlê li Ser Tofanê – The Hymn on the Storm. Attributed to Sheikh Fexir.
72. Qewlê Makê
73. Qewlê Mala Bava (Qewlê Hoş Malê Bava, Qewlê Disitrême) – The Hymn of the Home of Father. Has its own melody.
74. Qewlê Mal û Mêra (Qewlê Hey Mal û Mêran)
75. Qewlê Meha(n) (Qewlê Mehên Salê) – The Hymn of the Months. Attributed to Sheikh Fexir. Has its own melody (same as Qewlê Çarşema).
76. Qewlê Mela Ebû Bekir – The Hymn of Mela Ebu Bekir
77. Qewlê Melek Ferxedîn
78. Qewlê Melek Salim
79. Qewlê Melek Şêx Sin – The Hymn of Angel Sheikh Sin
80. Qewlê Mersûma Barî
81. Qewlê Mest im ji Qedehê
82. Qewlê Mezin – The Great Hymn. One of the Berane Qewls.
83. Qewlê Mewlê Me (Qewlê Kasa) – The Hymn of I am a Teacher
84. Qewlê Mirîdê (Qewlê Mirîdiyê) – The Hymn of Mirîds. Attributed to Pîr Reşê Heyran. Has its own melody.
85. Qewlê Miskîno Jaro – The Hymn of the Weak Miserable One. Has its own melody.
86. Qewlê Miskîn Tajdîn – The Hymn of Miskîn Tajdîn. Attributed to Sheikh Fexir. Has its own melody.
87. Qewlê Mişetê – The Hymn of Mişhet. Attributed to Sheikh Fexir. Has its own melody.
88. Qewlê Miştaqê Sê Bor im – The Hymn of I Crave for Three Steeds. Attributed to Hesedê el-Tewrî.
89. Qewlê Mizgîna Mêra – The Hymn of Good News
90. Qewlê Mizgîniyê (Qewlê Mizgîna Mêra, Qewlê Stiya Ês) – The Hymn of Good News. Attributed to Pîr Reşê Heyran.
91. Qewlê Mîr Birahîm (Qewlê Birahîm Xelîl) – The Hymn of Mîr Ibrahim. Has its own melody.
92. Qewlê Muhra Mêra
93. Qewlê Mûsa Pêxember – The Hymn of the Prophet Moses. Attributed to Sheikh Hevind.
94. Qewlê Mûsa Pêxember û Xidirê Zênde
95. Qewlê Nadir – The Hymn of the Rare [Knowledge]
96. Qewlê Nebî Mihemed
97. Qewlê Nebî Simayîl – The Hymn of the Prophet Ishmael. Sometimes attributed to Pîr Xidir. Has its own melody.
98. Qewlê Nefsê
99. Qewlê Nefs û Aqil
100. Qewlê Newrozê
101. Qewlê Nuh Pêxember
102. Qewlê Omer Xale û Hesin Çinêrî – The Hymn of Omer Xala and Hesin Çinêrî. Attributed to Sheikh Fexir or Dawidî bin Derman. Has its own melody.
103. Qewlê Pedşayî (Qewlê Padişayî) – The Hymn of the Lord. Attributed to Sheikh Fexir.
104. Qewlê Pişt Perde (lit. the hymn of "beyond the veil")
105. Qewlê Pîr Dawud – The Hymn of Pîr Dawud. Attributed to Pîr Dawud. Has its own melody (same as Qewlê Pîr Şeref).
106. Qewlê Pîrê Siba
107. Qewlê Pîr Hemedê Boz – The Hymn of Pîr Hemedê Boz
108. Qewlê Pîr Mehmedê Kurdî – The Hymn of Pîr Mehmedê Kurdî
109. Qewlê Pîr Reşê Heyran (Qewlê Pîr Reşîdê Heyran) – The Hymn of Pîr Reşê Heyran. Attributed to Pîr Reşê Heyran.
110. Qewlê Pîr Şeref (Beyta Beʿza, Beyta Baza) – The Hymn of Pîr Şeref. Attributed to Dawidî bin Derman. Has its own melody (same as Qewlê Pîr Dawud).
111. Qewlê Qazî Esker
112. Qewlê Qazî Şiro
113. Qewlê Qedîlbilban – The Hymn of Qedîlbilban
114. Qewlê Qendîla (Qewlê Zênare) – The Hymn of [the source of] the Lights. Attributed to Pîr Reşê Heyran or Sheikh Fexir. Has its own melody.
115. Qewlê Qere Firqan – The Hymn of the Black Firqan. Attributed to Sheikh Fexir. One of the Berane Qewls.
116. Qewlê Qiyametê 1 – The Hymn of the End of the World. Has its own melody.
117. Qewlê Qiyametê 2 – The Hymn of the End of the World. Has its own melody.
118. Qewlê Rabiʿe il-ʿEdewiye – The Hymn of Rabʿa al-ʿAdawiyyaʿ. Has its own melody.
119. Qewlê Rojekê Ez Sefer Bûm – The Hymn of One Day I Made a Journey. Attributed to Sheikh Fexir.
120. Qewlê Sera Mergê (Qewlê Seremergê) – The Hymn of the Moment of Death. Has its own melody. Often recited at funerals. One of the Berane Qewls.
121. Qewlê Sê Kasa Mest im
122. Qewlê Sibekê ji yêt ʿEdewiya
123. Qewlê Silavêt Melik Fexredîn – The Hymn of the Greetings of the Angel Fexredin. Attributed to Sheikh Fexir.
124. Qewlê Silavêt Mel(e)kê Kerîm – The Hymn of the Great Angel (i.e., God). Attributed to Pîr Xidir.
125. Qewlê Silav Silavêt Cebêra – The Hymn of the Greetings is the Greetings of the Mighty Ones. Attributed to Dawidî bin Derman.
126. Qewlê Silav û Sed Silav (Qewlê Şêxisin û Şêx Fexir) – The Hymn of Greeting and a Hundred Greetings. Attributed to Sheikh Fexir. Has its own melody.
127. Qewlê Simaîl Pêxember (Qewlê Nebî Simaîl) – The Hymn of the Prophet Simaîl
128. Qewlê Sincaqa
129. Qewlê Sindrûk
130. Qewlê Sinî Berî – The Hymn of Sinî Berî. Attributed to Sinî Berî. Has its own melody.
131. Qewlê Stiya Ês
132. Qewlê Sultan Êzîd (Qewlê Êzîd)
133. Qewlê Sura – The Hymn of Mysteries
134. Qewlê Şeq(e) Serî – The Hymn of Proper Conduct. Attributed to Sheikh Fexir. Sometimes considered to be one of the Berane Qewls.
135. Qewlê Şerfedîn – The Hymn of Şerfedîn. Attributed to Pîr Reşê Heyran. Has its own melody.
136. Qewlê Şêxadî û Mêra – The Hymn of Sheikh ʿAdî and Holy Men. Attributed to Pisê Cem. One of the Berane Qewls.
137. Qewlê Şêx Îsn – The Hymn of Sheikh Îsn
138. Qewlê Şêxisin û Şêx Fexir
139. Qewlê Şêşims – The Hymn of Sheikh Şêms. Attributed to Sheikh Fexir. Has its own melody. One of the Berane Qewls.
140. Qewlê Şêşimsê Tewrêzî – The Hymn of Sheikh Shems of Tabriz
141. Qewlê Şêx ʿErebegî ʿIntûzî – The Hymn of Sheikh Erebeg from Entush. Attributed to Sheikh Fexir.
142. Qewlê Şêxê Hesenê Siltan e (Qewlê Borê-borê) – The Hymn of Sheikh Hesen is the Sultan. Attributed to Sheikh Fexir. Has its own melody. Recited at funerals. One of the Berane Qewls.
143. Qewlê Şêxê Sirî
144. Qewlê Şêx Fexrê Zergûn – The Hymn of Sheikh Fexir, the Golden [One]. Attributed to Sheikh Fexir.
145. Qewlê Şêx Hadî – The Hymn of Sheikh Hadî
146. Qewlê Şêxê Mend û Gêla
147. Qewlê Şêx Mend û Şêx Reş – The Hymn of Sheikh Mend and Sheikh Reş
148. Qewlê Şêx Silêm – The Hymn of Sheikh Silêm
149. Qewlê Şêx û Aqûb (Qewlê Aqûb û Mûsa) – The Hymn of Sheikh and Jacob. Attributed to Sheikh Fexir.
150. Qewlê Şêxûbekir – The Hymn of Şêxûbekir (Obekr). Attributed to Pîr Reşê Heyran. Has its own melody (similar to Qewlê Xudanê Malê). One of the Berane Qewls.
151. Qewlê Şirûra – The Hymn of the Wars
152. Qewlê Şîrê Rastiyê (Qewlê Şûrê Rastiyê) – The Hymn of the Sword of the Truth
153. Qewlê Şîxisin
154. Qewlê Tawûsî Melek – The Hymn of Tawûsî Melek
155. Qewlê Temediya Şîxadî
156. Qewlê Tercal (Qewlê Tircalî, Qewlê Qiyametê) – The Hymn of the False Saviour
157. Qewlê Texta – The Hymn of Thrones. Attributed to Sheikh Fexir. Has its own melody.
158. Qewlê Ûsivê Nebiya
159. Qewlê Xafilê Bênasîn – The Hymn of the Unknown Negligence
160. Qewlê Xan Qubad – The Hymn of Xan Qubad
161. Qewlê Xerqe – The Hymn of the Xerqe. Attributed to Lawikê Pîr.
162. Qewlê Xewrê – The Hymn of Xewrê
163. Qewlê Xilmetê – The Hymn of the Service. Attributed to Sheikh Fexir.
164. Qewlê Xudanê Malê – The Hymn of the Protector of the House. Has its own melody (same as Qewlê Îmanê Bi Çi Nîşan e). Recited at funerals.
165. Qewlê Yazîd ibn Mavî
166. Qewlê Zebûnî Meksûr – The Hymn of the Weak Broken One. Attributed to Sheikh Fexir. One of the Berane Qewls.
167. Qewlê Zênare

=== Beyt ===
1. Beyta Beharê
2. Beyta Beʿza
3. Beyta Bilbila
4. Beyta Bilbil Miskîno
5. Beyta Cindî – The Beyt of the Commoner
6. Beyta Çarşemê
7. Beyta Derwêş Adem 1
8. Beyta Derwêş Adem 2
9. Beyta Dinê
10. Beyta Dirozga Şêşims – The Dirozge of Sheikh Şems
11. Beyta ʿElî Şêrê Xwedê
12. Beyta Eyûbê Kirmaxwarî (Beyta Eyûb Pêxember)
13. Beyta Feqîrê Teyra
14. Beyta Gilaviyê
15. Beyta Hesenê Cêlê
16. Beyta Heyî Malê – The Beyt of 'O Home'
17. Beyta Êvarî (Beyta Hêvarî: Hêvare dest)
18. Beyta îbrahîmê Bira
19. Beyta Kemkemir
20. Beyta Mezînê
21. Beyta Mihemed û Şeʿrê
22. Beyta Mirinê
23. Beyta Miskîn
24. Beyta Mîr Mihê
25. Beyta Mûsa Pêxember
26. Beyta Nesîheta
27. Beyta Neviyê Ometê (Beyta Mirina Nevîê Ometê)
28. Beyta Nisira
29. Beyta Pîrê Libnana
30. Beyta Pîr Mendî Gor
31. Beyta Reʿbiyê (Beyta Rebiʿe il-ʿEdewiye)
32. Beyta Serafiya Hindiya
33. Beyta Sêwena Kesik
34. Beyta Sibê (Beyta Şêşims, Beyta Têşta) — The Beyt of the Morning or The Beyt of Sheikh Shems
35. Beyta Silêman Pêxember û Bûm
36. Beyta Silêman Pîrê Esmaleka
37. Beyta Şeʿrê
38. Beyta Şêşims – The Beyt of Sheikh Şems or the Beyt of the Morning
39. Beyta Şêwra
40. Beyta Şêxadî (Şêx Hadî)
41. Beyta Şêxê Senʿan
42. Beyta Şêxisin
43. Beyta Şêx Mend Gêlê
44. Beyta Şêxû Pîra – The Beyt of Sheikhs and Pirs
45. Beyta Şîxalê Şemsa
46. Jandila Mendo

=== Duʿa ===
1. Duʿa
2. Duʿa Bawiriyê – Prayer of Belief
3. Duʿa Biskê – Prayer of the Lock of Hair. Recited during the initiation ceremony of bisk birîn, during which the Sheikh of the Lock (Şêxê Biskê) is invited to a house, and a boy's small lock of hair is cut.
4. Duʿa Bona Xwedê
5. Duʿa Çevşûştinê
6. Duʿa Dewrêşê ʿErd – Prayer of the Dewrêş of the Earth
7. Duʿa Dûpiştkê (Duʿaya Dûpişk û Mar) – Prayer [against the poison] of the scorpion and the snake
8. Duʿa Êşa Mekanî Jinê – Prayer [against] the pain of the women's uterus
9. Duʿa Êvarê (Duʿaya Hêvarî) – Evening Prayer
10. Duʿa Êzdiyatiyê – Prayer of Yezidism
11. Duʿa Fecrê – Prayer of Dawn
12. Duʿa Gêrgêratkê
13. Duʿa Heqîqetê
14. Duʿa Heyvê (Duʿa Hîvê)
15. Duʿa Îmanê – Prayer of (inner) Faith
16. Duʿa Kêma Heyvê – Prayer of the Waning Moon
17. Duʿaya li Mala Mîra
18. Duʿaya li Ser Giyanê Mirî
19. Duʿa Mehrê (Duʿa Meʿrbirînê, Diroza Zewacê) – Prayer of the Act of Marriage
20. Duʿa Meʿrîfetê
21. Duʿa Mirazê – Prayer of Desire
22. Duʿa Mirîdiyê – Prayer of Mirîds
23. Duʿa Mirîşûştinê
24. Duʿa Morkirinê
25. Duʿa Nezerê
26. Duʿa Newqandina Mîzê
27. Duʿa Nîvro – Prayer of Noon
28. Duʿa Oxirê – Prayer of the Fortunate. Recited before a long journey.
29. Duʿa Piştgirêdanê
30. Duʿa Pîraniyê – Prayer of Pîrs
31. Duʿa Razanê
32. Duʿa Rojhilatê
33. Duʿa Sebrê
34. Duʿa Serêşê
35. Duʿa Sibê (Duʿaya Sipêdeyî, Duʿaya Sibeykê) – Morning Prayer
36. Duʿa Sifrê – Prayer of the Meal
37. Duʿa Stêra Demilqapê – Prayer of the Morning Star
38. Duʿa Şebeqê
39. Duʿa Şerîeʿtê
40. Duʿa Şêxîtiyê
41. Duʿa Tawûsî Melek
42. Duʿa Tawûsî Melek
43. Duʿa Temametiya Şîxadî
44. Duʿa Tesmîlî ʿErd
45. Duʿa Tifaqê – Prayer of Agreement
46. Duʿa Tokê
47. Duʿa Xerqe – Prayer of Xerqe
48. Duʿa Xêrê
49. Duʿa Xundanê Malê
50. Duʿa Ziyaretbûnê – Prayer of Pilgrimage
51. Duʿa Xûdê
52. Nivêja Miriyan
53. Nivêja Rojhelatê
54. Paşnivêj
55. Temediya Şîxadî
56. Terqîna "Ferzê Biratiyê"
57. "The main Yazidi prayer" (by Yegiazarov 1891)
58. Dirozge (an important prayer with a long litany of important saints and historical figures)
59. Şedetiya Dîn ("The Declaration of the Faith") (recited before going to sleep)
60. Terqîn (Telqîn) (recited at funerals and animal sacrifices)

=== Qesîde ===
==== Qesîdên Pîranî ====
Qesîdes of the Pîrs:

1. Qesîda Alû Bekir
2. Qesîda Êk Siwar
3. Qesîda Hacyal(î)
4. Qesîda Hecî ʿElî
5. Qesîda Hesil Meman (Hesin Meman) – The Qesîde of Hesen Meman
6. Qesîda Hesnaleka
7. Qesîda Îsîbiya
8. Qesîda Mehmed Reşan – The Qesîde of Mehmed Reshan
9. Qesîda Mehmedî Reben
10. Qesîda Memê Şivan
11. Qesîda Pîrê Cerwa
12. Qesîda Pîrî Kemal
13. Qesîda Pîr Mihemed – Pîr Afat – Xetî Pisî
14. Qesîda Qedî Bilban
15. Qesîda Sinî Behrî

==== Qesîdên Şêxanî ====
Qesîdes of the Sheikhs:

1. Qesîda Adiya Şêxê Mine – 'Adi is my Sheikh'
2. Qesîda Amadîn
3. Qesîda Nasirdîn
4. Qesîda Sicadîn
5. Qesîda Şerfedîn – The Qesîde of Sherfedin
6. Qesîda Şêşims û Melik Fexredîn – The Qesîde of Sheikh Shems and Melik Fekhredin
7. Qesîda Şemsê Tewrêzî
8. Qesîda Şêx ʿAdî
9. Qesîda Şêx Alê Şemsa
10. Qesîda Şêx Babik
11. Qesîda Şêx Cencer
12. Qesîda Şêx ʿEbdil Qadir
13. Qesîda Şêx Mend
14. Qesîda Şêx Sin – The Qesîde of Sheikh Sin
15. Qesîda Şêxûbekir
16. Qesîda Xatûna Fexra

==== Other Qesîdes ====
1. Qesîda Çopan
2. Qesîda Kes netê
3. Qesîda Nadîmî
4. Qesîda Sibhan e ji te Melkê Ekber
5. Qesîda Tawûsî Melek

=== Semaʿ ===
1. Semaʿya Bilind
2. Semaʿya Maka Êz(î)
3. Semaʿya Merkeba (Semaʿ Miriya)
4. Semaʿya Qanûnî
5. Semaʿya Şerfedîn û Şêx Hesen
6. Semaʿya Şêşims
7. Semaʿya Zerza(yî)

=== Other poetic texts ===
1. Lavij (Dîroka Lavijê Pîrê)
2. Xizêmok – Song of the Xizêm ("Nose-Ring") of the Beloved
3. Payîzok – Autumn Song
4. Robarîn – Song of the Rivers
5. Xerîbo

=== Prose texts ===
==== Mishabet ====
Mishabet texts are sermons:

1. Derwêşê Bacarê Besrayê
2. Divê mirovê Êzdî çawa be
3. Li Ser Derwêşiyê û Dilê Paqij
4. Medh û Sena ji Şîxadî da
5. Mirin û Axiret
6. Mishabet û Şiret
7. Nijandina Adem
8. Pesna Şerfedîn
9. Şiret û Karê Baş

==== Çîrok û Çîvanok ====
Çîrok and Çîvanok texts are stories or narratives:

1. Çîroka Birahîm Xelîl (û Nemrûd)
2. Çîvanoka Hezretî Seîd Fesil (Fezl)
3. Çîroka Miskîn Tajdîn
4. Çîroka Nebû Xed Nesir û Qewlê Êzîd û Medehê
5. Çîroka Peydabûna Sura Êzî – The Story of the Appearance of the Mystery of Ezi
6. Çîroka Pîr Alî û Batizmî
7. Çîroka Pîr Mendî Gor – The Story of Pir Mend of the Grave
8. Çîvanoka Pîr Şerefê Mêravê û Sultan Şêx Mus
9. (Qewl û) Çîroka Qedî Bilban
10. Çîroka Silêman Pêxember û Bilqîzê
11. Çîroka Şîxadî û Siltan Zeng, Bedredîn û Şêx Hesen û Şêx Mend — The Story of Sheikh Adi and the Zangid Sultan, Bedredin, Sheikh Hesen and Sheikh Mend
12. Çîroka Şêx Fexr û Aqûbê Mûsa
13. Çîrok û Beyta Şêxê Sen’an

==== Dastan ====
Dastan texts are tales:

1. Dastana Aşiq Xerîb û Şah Senem
2. Dastana Gêla Mîr Etles
3. Dastana Mîr Mih
4. Dastan (û Beyta) Mîr Mihê – The Tale and Beyt of Mir Mih

== Texts translated into English ==
This section lists Yazidi oral religious texts that have been translated into English.

=== Omarkhali (2017) ===
Some representative samples of Yazidi oral religious poetry transcribed and compiled by Khanna Omarkhali (2017) include the following.

- Qewlê Padişa – The Hymn of the Lord
- Qewlê Zebûnî Meksûr – The Hymn of the Weak Broken One
- Qewlê Pişt Perde – The Hymn 'Behind the Veil'
- Beyta Heyî Malê – The Beyt of 'O Home'
- Beyta Şêşims or Beyta Sibê – The Beyt of Sheikh Şems or the Beyt of the Morning
- Dirozga Şêxşims – The Dirozge of Sheikh Şems
- Şehdetiya Dîn – The Declaration of the Faith
- Duʿayê Dewrêşê ʿErd – The Prayer to the Dewrêş of the Earth
- Duʿa Çevşûştinê – The Prayer of Washing One's Face
- Duʿa Hîvê – The Prayer of the Moon
- Duʿaya Tawûsî Melek – The Prayer of Tawûsî Melek
- Qesîda Pîrê Kemal – The Qesîde of Pîr Kemal
- Qesîda Şêx Babik – The Qesîde of Sheikh Babik

=== Kreyenbroek (2005) ===
Yazidi literature compiled by Philip G. Kreyenbroek (2005):

- Creation and early history of the world
  - Qewlê Zebûnî Meksûr – The Hymn of the Weak Broken One
  - Qewlê Afirîna Dinyayê – The Hymn of the Creation of the World
  - Qewlê Bê Elîf – The Hymn of B and A
  - Qewlê Hezar û Yek Nav – The Hymn of the Thousand and One Names
  - Qewlê Îmanê – The Hymn of the Faith
  - Qewlê Qendîla – The Hymn of the Lights
  - Qewlê Qere Ferqan – The Hymn of the Black Furqan
  - Dûʿa Bawiriyê – The Prayer of Belief
  - Dûʿa Ziyaretbûn – The Prayer of Pilgrimage
  - Dûʿa Tifaqê – The Prayer of Agreement
- Early history of the faith and community
  - Çîroka Siltanî Zeng û Şîxadî, Bedredîn û Şêx Hesenû Şêx Mend – The Story of the Zangid Sultan and Sheikh Adi, Bedredin, Sheikh Hesen and Sheikh Mend
  - Qewlê Pîr Dawud – The Hymn of Pir Dawud
  - Çîroka Pêdabûna Sura Êzî – The Story of the Appearance of the Mystery of Ezi
  - Qewlê Mezin – The Great Hymn
  - Qewlê Mela Abû Bekir – The Hymn of Mullah Abu Bekir
  - Qewlê Şêxadî û Mêra – The Hymn of Sheikh Adi and the Holy Men
- Stories about holy figures
  - Qewlê Êzdîne Mîr – The Hymn of Ezdina Mir
  - Çîroka Pîr Mendî Gor – The Story of Pir Mend of the Grave
  - Qewlê Rabiʿe il-ʿEdewiye – The Hymn of Rabiʿa al-ʿAdawiyya
  - Duʿa û Qewlê Şêşims – The Prayer and Hymn to Sheikh Shems
  - Beyta Sibê yan Beyta Şêşims – The Beyt of the Morning or The Beyt of Sheikh Shems
  - Bêta Şêx û Pîra – The Beyt of Sheikhs and Pirs
  - Adiye Şêxê Mine – 'Adi is my Sheikh'
  - Qesîda Şêşims û Melik Fexredîn – The Qesîde of Sheikh Shems and Melik Fekhredin
  - Qesîda Şêx Sin – The Qesîde of Sheikh Sin
  - Qesîda Şerfedîn – The Qesîde of Sherfedin
  - Qesîda Hesin Meman – The Qesîde of Hesen Meman
  - Qesîda Mehmed Reşan – The Qesîde of Mehmed Reshan
- Stories deriving from the Islamic or Judaeo-Christian tradition
  - Çîroka Birahîm Xelîl ligel Qewlê Birahîm Xelîl û Nemrûdû Qewlê Nebî Ismaîl – The Tale of Ibrahim the Friend including the Hymn of Ibrahim the Friend and Nemrud and the Hymn of Ismail
  - Beyta Bilbila – The Beyt of Nightingales
- Religious life and symbols
  - Misbabet: Derwêşê Bacarê Besrayê – Mishabet: The dervish of the city of Basra
  - Dûʿa Mirazê – The Prayer of Wishes
  - Diroze
- Moralistic texts, proper behaviour
  - Mishabet û Şîret – Sermon and Exhortation
  - Qewlê Mirîdiyê – The Hymn of the Mirids
  - Qewlê Şeqeserî – The Hymn of Proper Conduct
  - Beyta Nesîheta – The Beyt of Advice
- Death, grief and consolation
  - Dastan û Beyta Mîr Mihê – The Tale and Beyt of Mir Mih
  - Qewlê Seremergê – The Hymn of the Moment of Death
  - Qewlê Cumcumî Siltan – The Hymn of the Sultan's Skull
  - Qewlê Şêxê Hesenî Siltane – The Hymn of Sheikh Hesen the Sultan
  - Qewlê Mûsa – The Hymn of Moses
- End of times
  - Qewlê Tercal – The Hymn of the False Saviour
  - Qewlê Şerfedîn – The Hymn of Sherfedin
- Mystical themes
  - Qewlê Babekê Omera – The Hymn of Babeke Omera
  - Qewlê Aşê Mihbetê – The Hymn of the Mill of Love
- Other themes
  - Qewlê ʿErd û ʿEzman – The Hymn of Earth and Sky
  - Qewlê Keniya Mara – The Hymn of the Laughter of Snakes
  - Xizêmok
  - Payîzok
  - Robarîn

=== Kreyenbroek (1995) ===
Philip G. Kreyenbroek (1995) includes the following Yazidi texts:

- Qewlê Zebûnî Meksûr – The Hymn of the Weak Broken One
- Qewlê Afirîna Dinyayê – The Hymn of the Creation of the World
- Qewlê Îmanê – The Hymn of the Faith
- Qewlê Behra – The Hymn of the Oceans (not in Kreyenbroek & Rashow 2005)
- Qewlê Şêxûbekir – The Hymn of Sheykh Obekr (not in Kreyenbroek & Rashow 2005)
- Duʿaya Sibeykê – The Morning Prayer (not in Kreyenbroek & Rashow 2005)
- Duʿaya Hêvarî – The Evening Prayer (not in Kreyenbroek & Rashow 2005)
- Şehda Dînî – The Declaration of Faith (not in Kreyenbroek & Rashow 2005)
- Beyta Cindî – The Song of the Commoner (not in Kreyenbroek & Rashow 2005)
- Qewlê Ṭawûsî Melek – The Hymn Of Melek Tawus (not in Kreyenbroek & Rashow 2005)
- Qewlê Melek Şêx Sin – The Hymn of Melek Sheykh Hesen (not in Kreyenbroek & Rashow 2005)
- Qewlê Şêşimsê Tewrêzî – The Hymn of Sheykh Shems of Tabriz (not in Kreyenbroek & Rashow 2005)
- Qewlê Pîr Şeref – The Hymn of Pîr Sheref (not in Kreyenbroek & Rashow 2005)
- Qewlê Şêx ʿErebegê Entûşî – The Hymn of Sheykh Erebeg Entûsh (not in Kreyenbroek & Rashow 2005)
- Qewlê Pîr Dawûd – The Hymn of Pîr Dawûd
- Qewlê Şêxadî û Mêra – The Hymn of Sheykh Adi and the Holy Men
- Qewlê Qiyametê – The Hymn of the Resurrection (not in Kreyenbroek & Rashow 2005)
- Qewlê Miskîno Jaro – The Hymn of the Poor Miserable One (not in Kreyenbroek & Rashow 2005)
- Qewlê Seremergê – The Hymn of the Moment of Death

== See also ==
- Dastan
- Dua
- Kurdish literature
- Qasida
- Yazidi social organization
