= Khatuna Fekhra =

Holy figure in Yazidism

Xatûna Fexra
- Xudan of birth, pregnancy, women, children
- The name of Khatuna (𐺊𐺀𐺕𐺣𐺣𐺢𐺀) Fekhra (𐺙𐺦𐺊𐺍𐺀) in Yezidi script; written right-to-left
- Other names: Xezal (birth name)
- Venerated in: Yazidism
- Animals: Deer
- Gender: Female
- Region: Kurdistan
- Ethnic group: Kurds (Yazidis)

Genealogy
- Parents: Fexredîn (father)
- Siblings: Şêx Mend, Şêx Bedir, Aqûbê Mûsa
- Spouse: Şêx Hesenê Şemsa

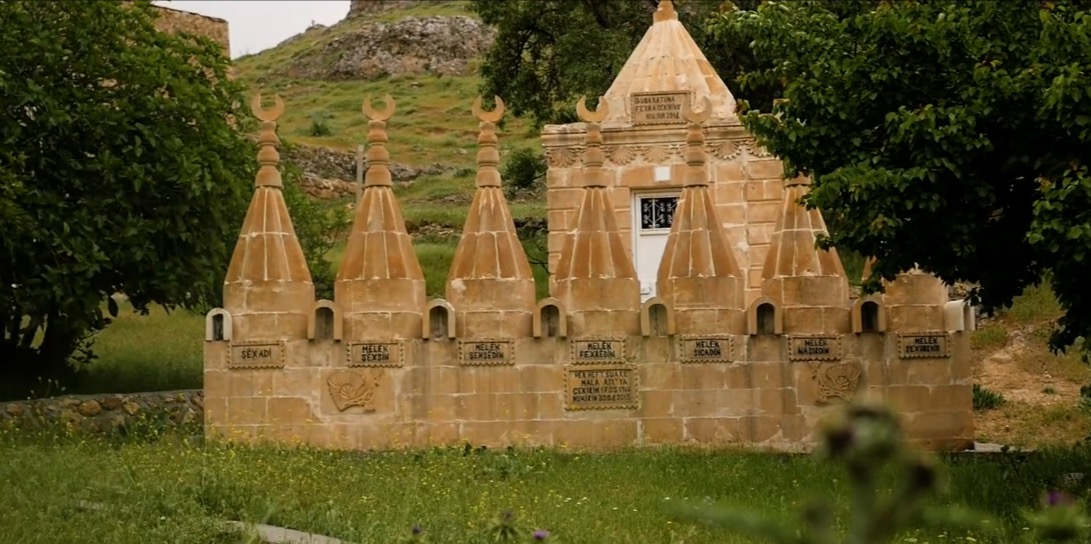
Temple of Khatuna Fekhra in Turkey

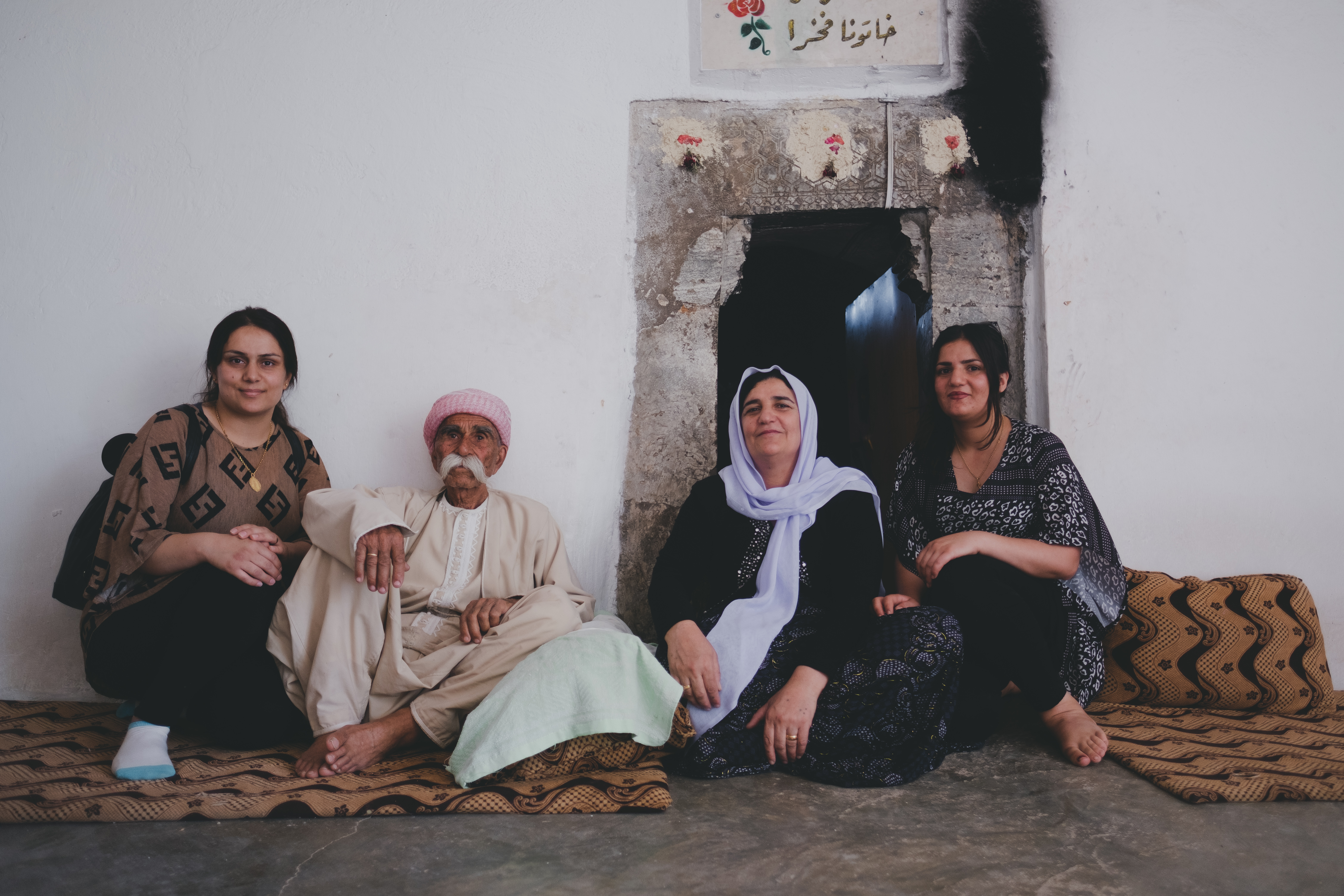
Pilgrims and worshippers at the shrine of Xatûna Fexra in Lalish, with the Micewir of the shrine, Sheikh Mirza (second from left), mid-2019.

Khatuna Fekhra (Kurdish: Xatûna Fexra) is a holy Yazidi female figure who is venerated as the Xudan of fertility, protector of women and children as well as patron of childbirth and pregnancy. A shrine in her honour stands at Lalish, the holiest Yazidi sanctuary in northern Iraq, and at Mağara in Şirnak province of southeastern Turkey. She lived in the 12th–13th centuries in the service of the family of Şîxadî, the reformer whose tomb draws pilgrims to Lalish, and received her calling by listening to him teach. Worshippers visit her shrine at Lalish to seek blessing and healing, and by custom share a meal in silence in its portico.

== Biography ==
Yazidi tradition places Xatûna Fexra in the 12th–13th centuries and counts her among the Şemsanî family, as the daughter of the prominent Yazidi holy figure Şêx Fexredîn and granddaughter of Êzdîna Mîr, as well as sister to Şêx Mend, Şêx Bedir and Aqûbê Mûsa. According to Yazidi tradition, her birth name was Xezal, however, she came to be known as Xatûna Fexra. Her brother Şêx Mend was the 13th-century emir of the Kurds in Antioch and Aleppo who served the Ayyubids and, in Yazidi tradition, resolved many of the community's internal problems during his rule.

She served the family of Sheikh Adi, and by listening to his dialogues and speeches received her calling, along with the sir û hikim ('mysteries and precepts') of Sheikh Adi's teachings.

== Religious Significance ==
Xatûna Fexra is venerated as a protector of unborn children and of women's fertility. Fertility carries particular weight in Yazidi thought, where humanity is understood to share in the Creator's work by propagating life on earth. Her cult holds special meaning for women who hope to become mothers or wish to protect their children, and for the wider community she is a figure of hope and protection.

At Lalish, a shrine is dedicated to her. Worshippers come to receive a blessing or to recite an invocation or prayer for healing, leaving a small offering. A portico for welcoming guests precedes the shrine. One part is an open space set aside for women; another serves as a kitchen, since it is customary to eat here when arriving at lunch or dinner time. The meal draws on traditional fare (rice, bulgur, lamb, chicken, meat broth, bamie (okra) and ayran (a yoghurt drink), with soft drinks and water) and is eaten in strict silence, concluding with a serving of hot tea.

The Quba Xatuna Fexra (Temple of Khatuna Fekhra) in Mağara, İdil, Şırnak Province, southeastern Turkey was built in honor of her.

== See also ==
- List of Yazidi holy figures
- List of Yazidi holy places
