= Yezidi social organization =

Yazidi social organisation

There is a social organizational structure in the Ezidi community. There are three main castes, namely the Mirids, the Sheikhs, and the Pirs. Furthermore, there are positions for dignitaries in the Ezidi hierarchy.

== Mîr ==
The Mîr (Prince) of Sheikhan is the highest political and religious authority of the entire Yezidi community. As a member of the Qatani Sheikhs, he is regarded as the legitimate successor of Sheikh Adi. The Mîr's influence reaches nearby communities, whereas in the more distant and disconnected Yezidi communities, namely of Georgia, Armenia and Syria, his influence decreases. However, in theory, particularly in diaspora, the Mir represents all Yezidis, his decisions are binding and he also maintains legislative and executive power. As the head of the spiritual council, he has the power to appoint the Baba Sheikh, administers Lalish and receives offerings from the annual journey and parading of the Sinjaq throughout the Yezidi communities. Additionally, he also wields some political influence in Iraqi politics. The current Mîr is Hazim Tahsin, but some Yezidis with opposing political affiliations decided to enact Naif Dawud as their Mîr. Hazim Tahsin is a former deputy in Kurdistan Region Parliament in Iraq. The former head was his father, Tahseen Said, who died in January 2019 in Germany, and was head of the community for nearly 75 years. The family of the Mîr resides in Ba'adra.

== Extiyarê Mergehê ==
The Extiyarê Mergehê (Elder of the 'Mergeh', i.e the area Lalish is situated in) also known as Babê Şêx (lit. 'Father Sheikh') is the highest spiritual leader of all Yezidis. His post is mainly granted hereditary but he is appointed by the Mîr. Among his tasks and obligations are to:

1. Visit Yazidi villages twice a year to keep them up to date on religious matters and solve conflicts within
2. Observe long periods of fasting of 40 days in the summer (Çilê Havînê) and winter (Çilê Zivistanê).
3. Guiding fellow religious clerics and instructing them in their religious duties.
4. Visiting Lalish and being present at religious feasts and events, and participating in rituals and ceremonies.

The acting Babê Şêx has to be from the priestly Şemsanî Sheikh lineage of Fexredîn, who was the first Extiyarê Mergehê. Babê Şêx cannot be dismissed or replaced unless if he dies or abandons the Yazidi faith. The current Baba Sheikh is Ali Alyas. The previous Baba Sheikh was Khurto Hajji Ismail. The position is typically hereditary and passes from father to son, although the Baba Sheikh needs to be formally appointed by the Mir.

== Sheikh ==
A Sheikh's official duty is to be a spiritual guide for his follower, thus Sheikhs may express sermons and impose taboos on his followers (Mirîds) and compose prayers for them. All Yezidis, including those belonging to Sheikh and Pir castes themselves, are obliged to have a Sheikh and a Pîr. A Sheikh is expected to attend important events of his followers, such as births, funerals and weddings. For this duty, the followers give a certain annual amount of money to their Sheikhs. Sheikh has the same meaning in Arabic as Pîr does in Kurdish.

Many Yezidis believe that by honouring the living Sheikh, they are worshipping the holy figure who is the eponym of his lineage. The Sheikhs are divided into three groups, the Şemsanî, Adanî and Qatanî. These groups are divided into smaller lineages and sub-lineages, i.e clans/families. The Şemsanî are believed to have lineage from the four sons of Êzdîna Mir, the last Yezidi ruler that reigned prior to Sheikh Adi's arrival in Lalish, the Adanî claim descent from Şêxisin, the great-grandson of Sheikh Adi's brother, and the Qatanî claim descent from Şêxûbekir, whom they believe to have been Sheikh Adi's kinsman. The three groups, in turn divided into further smaller sub-lineages are as follows:

=== Şemsanî ===
The Şemsanî are divided into four branches, each descended from the four sons of Êzdîna Mîr:

1. Şemsedîn – further divided into smaller lineages (listed below)
2. Fexredîn – further divided into smaller lineages (listed below)
3. Nasirdîn – not further divided into smaller lineages
4. Sicadîn – not further divided into smaller lineages

Şêşims (Şemsedîn)

1. Şêx Alê Şemsa
2. Şêx Amadînê Şemsa
3. Şêx Avîndê Şemsa
4. Şêx Babadînê Şemsa
5. Şêx Bavikê Şemsa
6. Şêx ʿEvdalê Şemsa
7. Şêx Hesenê Şemsa
8. Şêxê Reş (Cinteyar)
9. Şêx Tokilê Şemsa
10. Şêx Xidirê Şemsa
11. Sitya Îs (Ês)
12. Sitiya Nisret
13. Sitiya Bilxan (Belqan)

Şêşims lineages found only among the Yazidis of the Caucasus:

1. Cin Teyar
2. Dara Miraza
3. Toxa Enzel

Fexredîn

1. Şêx Bedir
2. Şêx Mendê Fexra(n)
3. Xatûna Fexra(n)
4. Aqûb

=== Adanî – Şêxisin ===
1. Şêx Brahîmê Xetimî
2. Şêxê Êtîma
3. Şêx Mûsê Sor
4. Şêx Şerfedîn
5. Şêx Zêndîn
6. Sitiya Gul

=== Qatanî ===
- Dewrêş Qapan
  - Derwêş Cirgîn
    - Derwêş Gurgîn
      - Derwêş Rezwan
        - Derwêş Miskîn
          - Derwêş Mistaltaîn
            - Dewrêş Adem, according to Yazidi oral tradition, Dewrêş Adem lived during the time of Sheikh Adi. He did not want to be a Dewrêş anymore, whereupon Sheikh Adi sent him to Xoristan to Mîr Mehmedê Xoristanî to marry his daughter, Xecîcê Xoristanî. From their marriage, Derwêş Birahîm was born.
              - Derwêş Birahîm / Mîr Birahîm, lived after Sheikh Adi and was both a Derwêş and a Mîr
                - Şêxûbekir
                  1. Şêx ʿEbdilqadir
                  2. Şêx Îsmaîlê ʿEnzelî
                  3. Şêx Kara
                  4. Şêx Maviyê Zar
                  5. Şêx Mehmedê Batinî
                  6. Şêx Sorê Sora
                  7. Şêx Xelîfeta

== Pîr ==
The Pîr's duties are similar to the ones of a Sheikh. He can attend the majority of the events as well which the Sheikh attends, if the Sheikh is not able to, but he is awarded just about half of the money a Sheikh receives in exchange.

=== Lineages of Pîr caste ===
The following lineages have been recorded by Khanna Omarkhali:

1. Afa
2. Al
3. Alûbekir (Alobekir)
4. Atqatê
5. Axa
6. Bad (Bat)
7. Bazîd
8. Beʿrî
9. Beybûn
10. Biwal
11. Boz (Bûz)
12. Bû
13. Bûb (Bob)
14. Bûk
15. Cervan (Cerwan, Cebran, Cerva)
16. Çak
17. Çêlê
18. Davûd (Daudî bi(n) Derman)
19. Delî
20. Deva
21. Dirbês (Derbis)
22. ʿEvdîa
23. Êzîd
24. Gavanê Zerzan
25. Gerger
26. Hacîal
27. Hacxal
28. Hecî ʿElî (Hecî ʿElî Memîn)
29. Hecî Mehemed (bêzuret)
30. Hemedê Babê
31. Hemelî
32. Hesen
33. Hesen Çikêr
34. Hesen Çînari (Hesen Çinêrî)
35. Hesen Deqîq
36. Hesen Te ʿIk
37. Hesîn Pîr
38. Hesîn Şîrin
39. Hesmeman (Hesen Meman) (pîrê çil pîra 'the Pir of the Forty Pirs')
40. Hesnalka (Hesen Êlka)
41. Hesnenak (Heslemak, Heslenak)
42. Hêsim
43. Hû
44. Îs
45. Îsîbiya (Êsîbiya)
46. Kemala
47. Kewkî
48. Liblan (Libna, Libina)
49. Lûfî
50. Mala Bala
51. Mehbûf (Mebûb)
52. Mehed Yeşan
53. Mehmedê Reben
54. Mehmûd
55. Memê Reşan (Mehmedê Reşan)
56. Memê Şivan
57. Men
58. Mend
59. Mensûr
60. Meqlebêz (Melqebêz)
61. Mervan (Merwan)
62. Meysûr
63. Momin
64. Mûs (Mosê)
65. Navdar
66. Omerxalî (Omerê Xala)
67. Qedîbilban
68. Qelender
69. Qerecer
70. Qilêç
71. Reşê Heyran
72. Reşîd Mêravê
73. Sibatê (Siba)
74. Sinîbalê
75. Sînanezar
76. Sînexalî
77. Şalyar
78. Şamîa
79. Terciman
80. Tûskî
81. Tûz
82. Xanîa
83. Xefûf
84. Xemsî
85. Xetîpisî (Xetîb Pisî)
86. Xoşava (Xoş Afa)
87. Zekir (Zikir)

== Peshimam ==
Peshimams are responsible for holding wedding ceremonies, and are appointed by the Mîr amongst the family of the Peshimams. They cannot be dismissed, and can only be replaced if they die or abandon the Yazidi faith. In addition, Peshimams belong to the Adanî Sheikh clan, specifically the Şerfedîn or Şêxsin branches.

The types of Peshimams are:

- Great Peshimam (Pêşîmamê Mezin), who belongs to the Şêxsin branch of the Adanî clan
- Peshimam of the Feqirs (Pêşîmamê Feqîran)
- Peshimam of the Baba Sheikh (Pêşîmamê Bavê Şêx), who belongs to the Şerfedîn branch of the Adanî clan

== Sheikh Wezir ==
The Sheikh Wezir (Şêxê Wezîr) holds one of the highest clerical positions in the Ezidi community. He is a member of the Yezidi Spiritual Council and participates in leading religious ceremonies dedicated to the holy sites of Şêşims. The Sheikh Wezir also serves as the vizier of the Emir, acting as his counsellor. He has to be from the priestly Şemsanî Sheikh lineage of Şêşims, who - in Ezidi sacral texts - is often referred to as “Wezîrê Dîwanê” (Vizier of Divan, lit. “assembly”, “council”). Like other members of Lalish’s central spiritual clergy, the Sheikh Wezir is seen as the representative of his ancestor, Şêşims. The appointment of the Sheikh Wezir is decided by the Spiritual Council of the Iraqi District.

== Kochek ==
The Kocheks are seers who are led by the Baba Sheikh. They collect wood and water among other duties they have and they also observe forty-day fasts in winter and summer, perform the duties of an absent Pir or Sheikh. They're known for their role as traditional healers and their ability to see into the future and utter prophecies as well as interpreting dreams and communicating with the dead, supernatural and the "World of the Unseen". People visit them when they need advice, have dreams or visions and need explanations. When consulted, Kocheks ponder or dream over the request or diagnosis until they eventually determine which Yezidi saint may be useful. Several saints are associated with healing qualities, including Sheikh Mand for snake bites, Sheikh Mus and Sheikh Hassan for rheumatic and lung problems, Sherfedin for skin-related issues and Sheikh Amadin for stomach pain.

== Feqir ==
Feqirs devote their entire lives to the service of religion and may observe all rituals, taboos and religious acts. This position is available for all Yezidis who live pious, humble and ascetic lives and receive the calling. Feqirs don't denote a distinct class within the Yezidis, however, feqirs who hail from the clerical castes are referred to as "Feqîr Dunav", i.e. Feqîr with two honors, meanwhile the feqirs from the Mîrid caste are referred to as "Feqîr Yeknav", i.e. Feqîr with one honor. Feqirs wear a distinguishable outfit, made from black wool and called Kherqe which was baptised at the White Spring in Lalish. Additionally, they also wear red belts, copper rings and caps referred to as kulik, which represent Sheikh Adi's crown and for which they are sometimes referred to as Karabash ("Black heads") due to its black colour. Kherqes that get worn out aren't thrown away, but stored at a shrine until it decomposes. Other than in Lalish, these shrines are located in Shingal at Pir Akhayi shrine and in Qibare, Kurd dagh at Melek Adî shrine. Feqirs, symbolizing religious purity, don't shave their beards and they also participate in many ceremonies, including Tewaf and Cêjna Cemaiya at the procession where they represent Sheikh Adi. Feqirs are highly respected and in their communities, may deal with mediation and reconciliation. Even the clergy and the mukhtar obey their rulings and whenever they enter a room while wearing their kherqe, everyone is required to stand up to greet and pay him respects, including the Mîr and the elderly.

== Qewal ==
Qewals are a hereditary group of performers of Yazidi religious hymns who come traditionally from two tribes of Mirîds: Dumilî and Hekarî. However, more recently, there are also some Qewals who are from the Mamûsî tribe. Qewals are the main individuals that are responsible for the preservation and transmission of Yazidi religious texts. The centre of Qewals is traditionally considered to be the two villages of Bashiqa and Bahzani, where, according to oral history, schools of Qewals existed until the beginning of 20th century. Children from Qewal families were sent to these schools to be taught the religious texts and learn to play the sacred musical instruments of def and şibab. Despite the role of Qewals however, the task of memorising, transmitting and explaining religious texts is not carried out exclusively by Qewals, but also by the knowledgeable representatives of the priestly castes of Pîrs and Sheikhs, the Feqîrs, Koçeks and various "Qewlbêjs" from the Mirîd caste.

Qewals gained prominence especially owing to their role in the Tawûsgêran ceremony, in which they visit different Yazidi communities in various regions with the sacred effigy of Tawûs (Sencaq), perform and recite religious texts, teach them to interested people, exchange news and collect the religious donations for Lalish. Qewals also recite religious texts at big Yazidi feasts celebrated in Lalish. For example, during Sema ceremony at the Feast of the Assembly, five Qewals sit (while others who are present at the ceremony are to stand) near the procession and play with the sacred instruments; two Qewals of the Hekarî tribe sit on the right and play the şibab while the three other Qewals, who hail from the Dumilî tribe, sit on the left and play with the def while chanting the religious hymns.

== Mirids (Mirîdxane) ==
The Mirids (Mirîdxane) are laymen.

== Women ==
=== Fakra ===
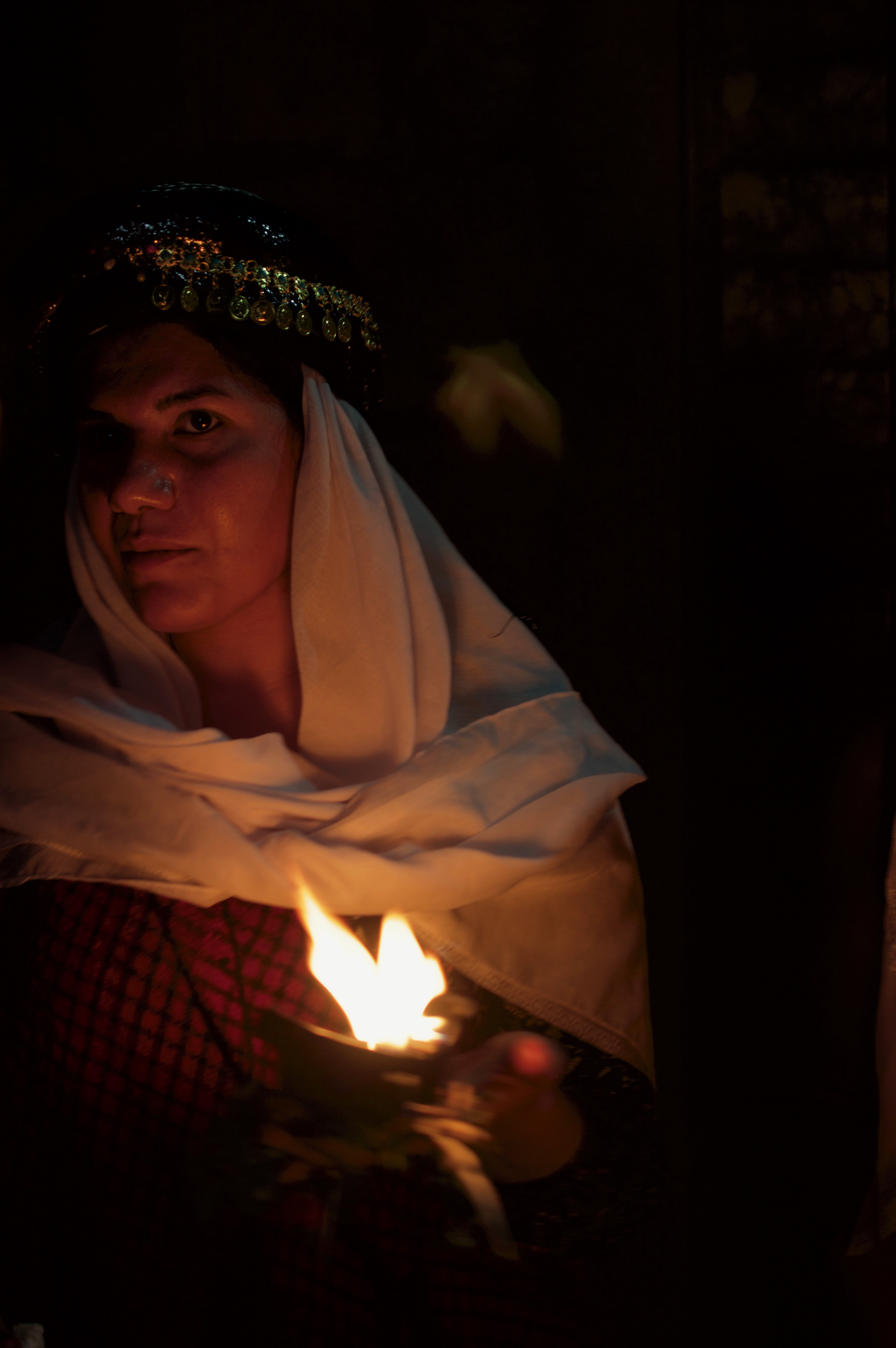
Yazidi Fakra at the Yazidi New Year festival at Lalish on 18 April 2017

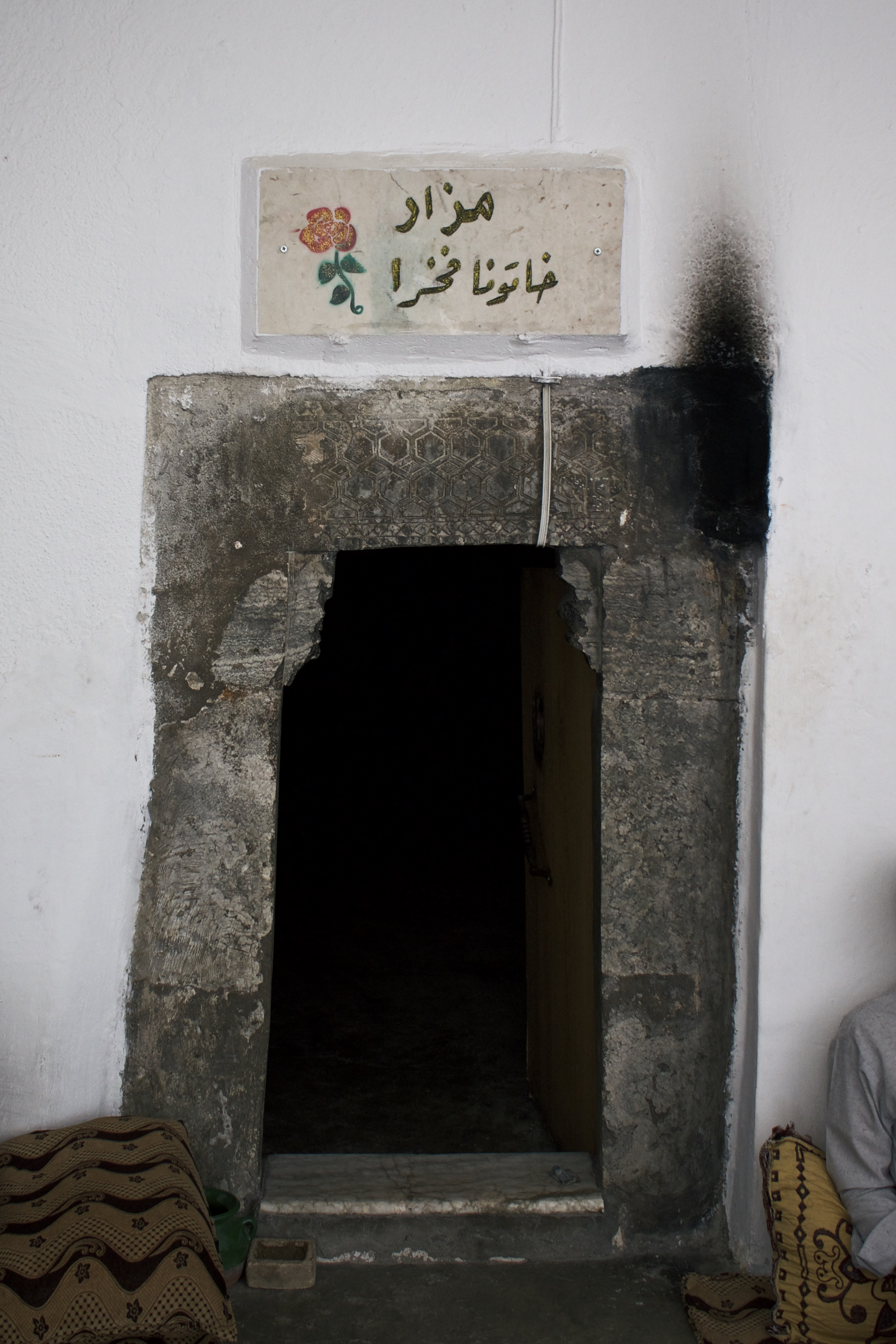
Entrance to the shrine of Khatuna Fakra at Lalish

Members of a Yazidi women’s order are called Fakra (other spellings: Fekra, Fekhra, Fakhra, Fahra). Only Yazidi women who are virgins and who have chosen a chaste and ascetic life can be accepted as members of this women's order. The Fakra are responsible for the maintenance of the Yazidi temple Lalish. The head of the Yazidi women's order is called Kebanî ("mistress of the house").

=== Kebani ===
Kebani ("mistress of the house") are members of a Yazidi women's order in Lalish who hold the highest position within the women's order. Kebani is the highest female rank within the Yazidi hierarchy that a woman can achieve. The rank is determined by the most deserving order members.

== Micêwir ==
Micêwir is the title of the custodian of a local shrine, cemetery and to a lesser extent, preservation of a religious instruction or knowledge. Micêwirs come normally from Sheikh or Pir castes, but Feqirs may also hold this office. A Micêwir often officiates at a funeral and organizes local events, namely religious festivals and the annual village Tiwaf, a Micêwir also has the duty of receiving and hosting Qewals during Tiwaf, reciting religious prose and qewls to the locals during evening sessions. Meanwhile, a mukhtar or a village elder is often in charge of the government or official matters, a Micêwir is responsible for the religious affairs.

== Other roles ==
A sibling of the hereafter (birayê, xuşka, axiretê) is a lifelong spiritual "brother" or "sister", typically from a Sheikh lineage. The sibling of the hereafter is assigned to a Yazidi man or woman starting from adolescence, and helps him or her go through rites of passage such as weddings. The spiritual sibling is supposed to help the person safely reach the next world after their death.

A mirebbi is a hereditary teacher in Yazidi society. Although a mirebbi may belong to any caste, he must belong to the same lineage as his disciple.

An osta or hosta is a teacher of qewls (sacred hymns). The role is not hereditary and is not restricted to any caste.

A keriv or kerif is a godfather in Yazidi society. He is the man on whose knees a boy has been circumcised. The keriv serves as an important social link between families.

== See also ==
- Gathering of the spiritual
- List of Yazidi saints
