= Khurto Hajji Ismail =

Yazidi religious leader (1933–2020)

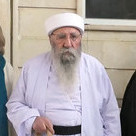
- Title: Baba Sheikh (بابه‌شێخ)

Personal life
- Born: 1933
- Died: 1 October 2020 (aged 86–87) Erbil, Kurdistan Region, Iraq

Religious life
- Religion: Yazidism
- Lineage: Sheikh Fakhradin

Khurto Hajji Ismail (1933 – 1 October 2020, Kurdish: Xurto Hecî Îsmaîl) was the Baba Sheikh of the Yazidis until his death in 2020. He held this position since 2007. He lived in Ain Sifni, Iraq.

He played an important role in reintegrating Yazidi society by helping the community avoid feuds and reintegrating thousands of Yazidi women and girls rescued from ISIS slavery and by declaring that all those who had been forced to convert to Islam should be accepted back into the Yazidi community.

He died on 1 October 2020 in a hospital in Erbil, aged 87. He had entered hospital two days before with heart and kidney problems. His funeral was attended by thousands of Yazidis, governmental and partisan officials, and Islamic as well as Christian religious figures and was buried in Bozan village of Sheikhan district of Iraq's Nineveh Governorate.

== Visits ==
In 2011, after a six-day visit to Georgia during which he met the Catholicos-Patriarch of All Georgia Ilia II, Baba Sheikh left Tbilisi to pay an official visit to the Vatican, where he met Pope Benedict XVI. During this visit, Baba Sheikh attended a conference held in Assisi on 27–28 October, where the main theme was the peaceful coexistence of different religions.

On 29 October 2014, the Baba Sheikh visited the Hindu Murugan Temple of North America in Washington, D.C., and attended the prayer ceremonies held there and prayed for peace on the Earth.

== See also ==
- Tahseen Said
- Yazidism
