= Pir Ali (Yezidi saint) =

Yazidi saint

Pîr Alî
- Other name: Pîyalî
- Known for: Performing miracles, resurrecting a cow

Pîr Alî (also written as Pîyalî) is a holy person in the Yazidi religion. The Çêlka Yazidis celebrate the Batizmî festival in his honor.

According to Yazidi tradition, Pîr Alî came to the Yazidi villages of Tur Abdin and performed miracles there. He is said to have brought a cow that had already been slaughtered and cut into seven parts back to life and thus convinced the local Yazidis of his abilities. Due to this, the Çêlka Yazidis celebrate the Batizmî festival in his honor. During the festival, seven pieces of meat from various parts of a slaughtered animal are cut and cooked (known as herheft perçên Pîyalî), and then arranged on a mat alongside specially prepared seven candlewicks (çira) and seven handfuls of raisins.
