= Sheikh Mand =

Yazidi saint, first ruler of Kilis principality

- Emir
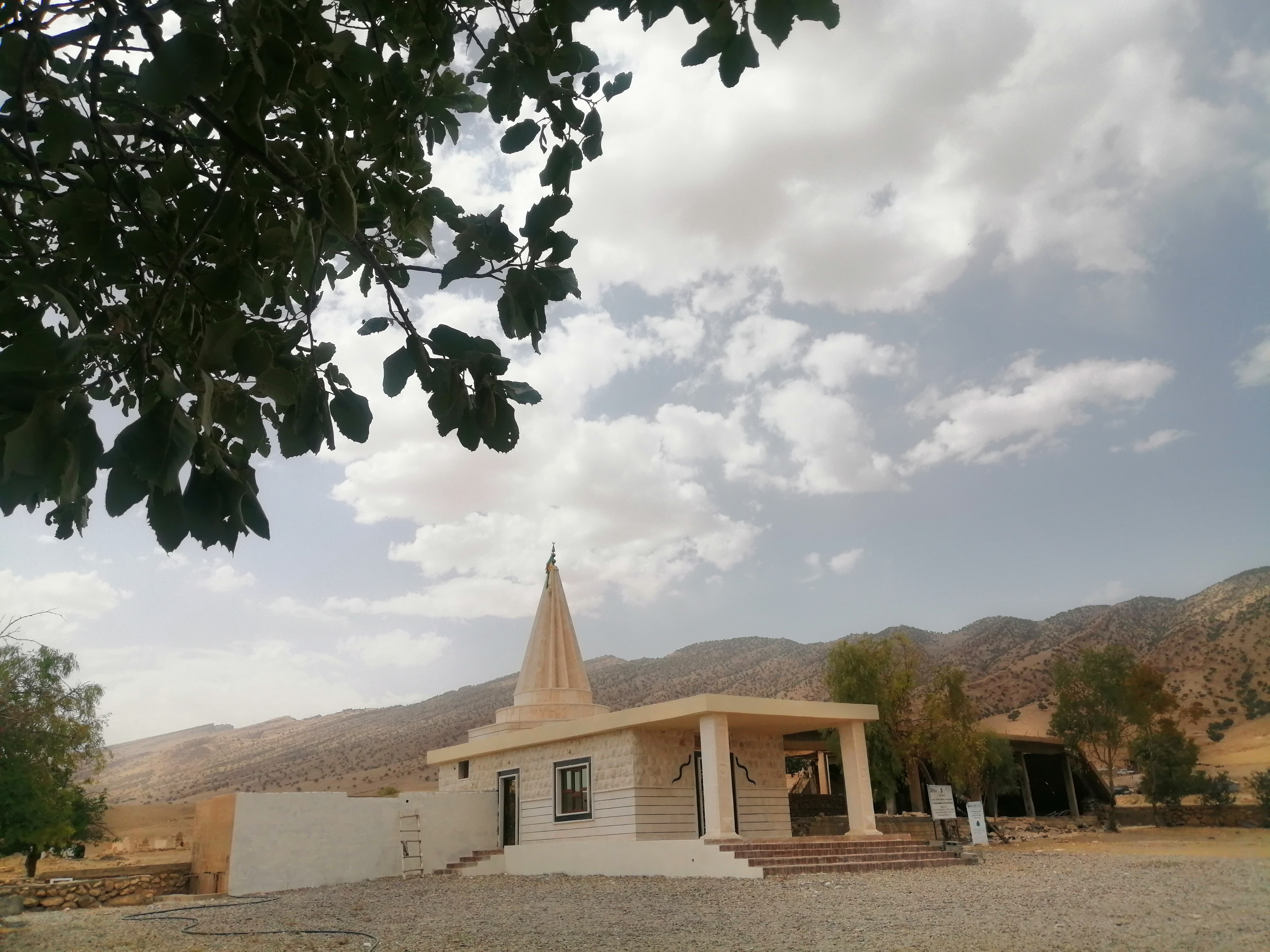
- Quba Sheikh Mand, a shrine dedicated to Sheikh Mand in Sinjar, Iraq which was destroyed by ISIS on 25 August 2014 and then rebuilt in 2021

Emir of Kurds
- Born: 13th century
- Dynasty: Şemsanî
- Father: Fexredîn
- Religion: Yazidism

Sheikh Mand or Sheikh Mend, Sheikh Mand Pasha (Kurdish: Şêx Mend) was a 12th-century Yazidi saint, ruler of Kilis principality and a son of Şêx Fexredîn, belonging to the Şemsanî lineage of sheikhs. His sister was Khatuna Fekhra, revered today as one of the most important Yazidi female saints. The black snake is his emblem in Yazidi tradition, depicted beside the entrance of shrines dedicated to him, and a visit to his shrine is held to protect against snakebite.

== Biography ==
Sheikh Mend was the Pasha of Kilis and Aleppo under the reign of the Ayyubids, who had granted him the title of "Emir of the Kurds" along with the rule of Qoseir castle located in western Aleppo, and a fiefdom over Kurds in Levant, by then still largely Yazidis. Yazidi tradition also credits him with settling many of the Yazidis' internal problems during his rule.

== Religious significance ==
Sheikh Mand is traditionally considered to be a patron of snakes. His shrine at Lalish is said to contain a cave that is full of snakes.

The black snake serves as his emblem and is depicted beside the entrance of shrines dedicated to him across the region. A visit to his shrine is held to be especially effective against snakebite. According to a legend, a travelling tribe under attack by black snakes asked for help (hawar in Kurdish), and Şêx Mend drove the snakes off with a command, without harming or killing them. The tribe came to be called the Hewêriya ('those who asked for help'), and the black snake became his symbol. Another version of the myth credits him with transforming into a large serpent and deterring this tribe from converting to Islam after a dispute with the Yazidi prince, for which the tribe came to receive its name, made up of the compound words hew wêri ('no longer dared'). For this, he is highly venerated in the tribe until today. A tradition credits a black serpent with sealing a hole in Noah's ark during the Flood.

=== Shrine at Xoşaba ===
The merqed ('place of sleep', from Arabic raqada, 'to sleep') of Şêx Mend Paşa stands in the cemetery on top of a hill outside Xoşaba. A large black snake is depicted at the entrance, and a slab above the door commemorates a restoration in 1997. Inside, the main room has an entrance wall clad in marble, a wrought-iron door set with two octagonal stars as decoration, and a paved floor; a second room is decorated across an entire wall with a large reproduction of Lalish. The shrine holds two sindruk (cenotaphs), one of Qafirê Xelqa and one of a soldier of Şêx Mend, but not the saint's own. Beside the cemetery lies a large square used for village events and festivals such as the tewaf. The lamp (çira) and its wick (fitîl) must be lit by a virgin member, man or woman, of the custodian's (micêwir) family.
