= Sicadîn =

Yazidi holy figure

- Psychopomp & Messenger of Death
- Member of the Heptad
- Venerated in: Yazidism
- Region: Kurdistan
- Ethnic group: Kurds (Yazidis)

Genealogy
- Parents: Ezdina Mir (father)
- Siblings: Fexredîn, Nasirdîn, Sheikh Shems

Sheikh Sejadin or Sejad ad-Dīn (Kurdish: Şêx Sicadîn) is a holy figure venerated in Yazidism, he is considered one of the Seven Divine Beings, to all of whom God assigned the World's affairs, and his earthly incarnation is considered one of the four sons of Ezdina Mir along with Nasirdîn, Sheikh Shems, and Fexredîn, who are the respective ancestors and patriarchs of the four Şemsanî Sheikh lineages and are considered to have been avatars of the angelic beings.

Along with Nasirdîn, he is also revered as one of the two death angels who take Yazidi souls into the afterlife. Nasirdîn is identified as the Angel of Death and Renewal while Sicadîn plays the role of a psychopomp and Messenger of Death. They come to a person during his/her death whereupon Sicadîn serves as a messenger of death, whereas Nasirdîn is the hangman who separates the soul from the body.

== See also ==
- Yazidism
- List of Yazidi holy figures
- Psychopomp
