= Emirate of Kilis =

Kurdish emirate of Kilis

Emirate of Kilis Mîrektiya Kilîsê
- 1181/1183–1610
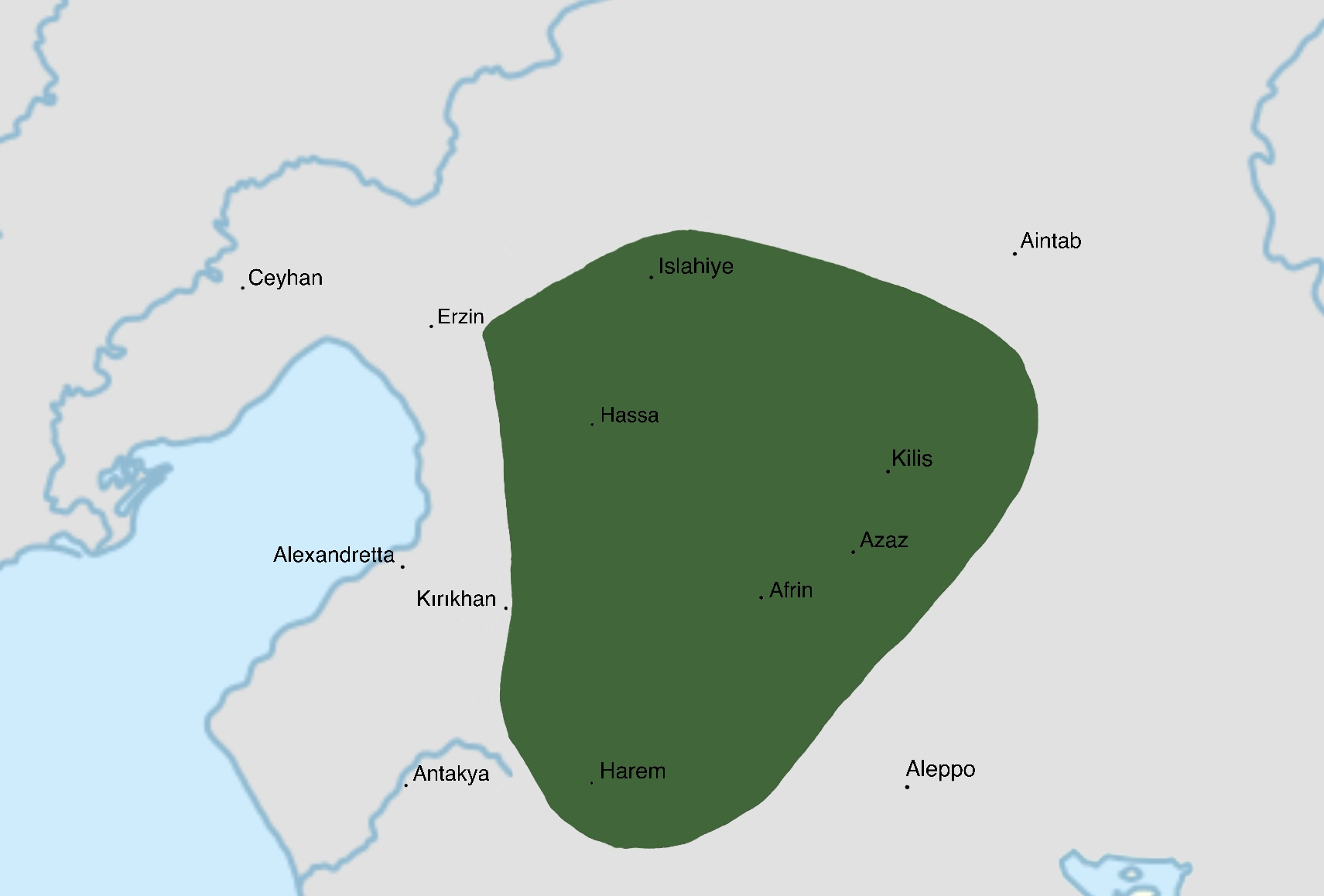
- Approximate extent of the Emirate of Kilis.
- Status: Vassals of Ayyubid dynasty (1181/1183-1260)
- Capital: Kilis
- Common languages: Kurdish (Kurmanji)
- Religion: Sunni Islam; Yazidism
- Demonym: Kilisian
- Emir of Kurds
  - 12th-13th century: Sheikh Mand (first)
  - 1606-1607: Ali Janbulad (last)
- History
  - Established: 1181/1183
  - Disestablished: 1610
- Currency: Dinar
Preceded by	Succeeded by
Principality of Antioch; Ayyubid dynasty	Ottoman Empire
- Today part of: Turkey; Syria

Emirate of Kilis (Kurdish: Mîrektiya Kilîsê) was a Kurdish emirate which ruled the Kilis and Afrin in Antioch regions up until the disintegration of the Ayyubid dynasty during the time of Saladin. The rulers of this principality were descendants of Sheikh Fakhraddin, who is one of the greatest Yezidi philosophers and one of the most important saint figures. The main religion of this principality was Yazidism.

== History ==
=== Origin ===
The rulers of Kilis were descendants of Sheikh Mend, one of Hakkari tribal leaders who was the son of Sheikh Fakhraddin. At the late 12th century and the beginning of the 13th century. Due to the good relations with the Ayyubid dynasty under Saladin, who was himself a Kurd, Sheikh Mand was appointed as the rulers of the principality that stretched from Afrin to Kilis, Maraş in today's Turkey. Sheikh Mend was later known as the “Prince of Princes" and "Emir of Kurds".

=== Rule ===
When the Ayyubid dynasty collapsed around 1260, the Mamluks appointed Mend Kasim as the ruler of the emirate. The Mamluks ultimately changed their support to İzzeddin, but he with Mamluk support failed at removing Kasım from power. When Ottoman Sultan Selim I expanded his empire and conquered the area, he received support from Mend Kasım. However, while visiting Constantinople, Kasım was executed by the Sultan after the latter had received a report from Karaca Beg, the Governor of Aleppo, and İzzeddin on the possible disorder in the case of Kasım's return to Kilis. After years of servitude to the Sultan, Kasım's son, Canpolat succeeded in obtaining the right to govern Kilis in 1515 and governed until his death in 1572. His son Hüseyin was able to expand the emirate towards Aleppo but was executed by the local pasha after being accused of murder. The emirate was subsequently governed by Hüseyin's nephew Ali who went on a revenge campaign against his rivals for the death of his uncle. The Ottomans thus sent an army to remove Ali who had to flee to Constantinople where he was executed in 1610. Despite a paucity of information, the followers of Ali remained in the region and were a source of trouble between 1613 and the 1690s, notably the Okçu İzzeddinli tribe which was involved in banditry.

=== The Canbolatoğulları ===
The descendants of Canbolat are named 'Canbolatoğulları' and fled to Lebanon in 1630. The Druze Jumblatt family are descendants of this family. The Jumblatt family is an important family in Lebanese history and is still involved in Lebanese politics.

== Population ==
The principality had a mixed Yazidi and Muslim Kurd population.

== See also ==
- Baban
- Bahdinan
- Soran Emirate
