= Nasirdîn =

Yazidi holy figure

- Angel of Death and Renewal
- Member of the Heptad
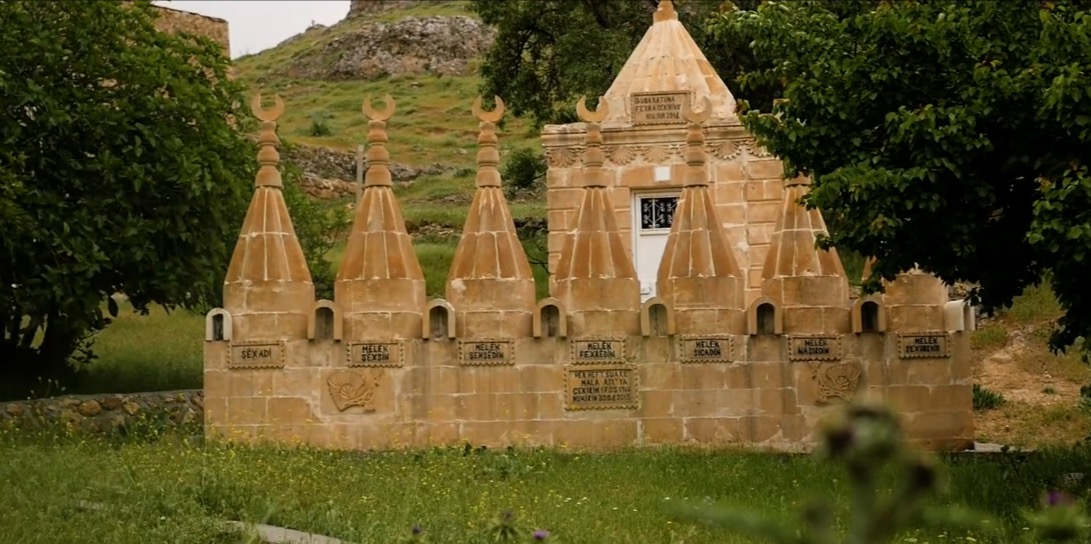
- Seven domes dedicated to the seven Divine Beings including Nasirdîn, at the shrine of Xatûna Fexra in Mağara, İdil, Turkey
- Other names: Sheikh Nasirdin, Melek Nasirdin, Naṣir ad-Dīn
- Venerated in: Yazidism
- Region: Ezdixan
- Ethnic group: Yazidis
- Parents: Ezdina Mir (father)

Sheikh Nasirdin, Melek Nasirdin or Naṣir ad-Dīn (Kurdish: Şêx Nasirdîn, Melek Nasirdîn) is a holy figure venerated in Yazidism, he is considered one of the Seven Divine Beings, to all of whom God assigned the World's affairs, and his earthly incarnation is considered one of the four sons of Ezdina Mir along with Sheikh Shems (Shems ad-Dīn), Fakhraddin, and Sejadin, who are the respective ancestors and patriarchs of the four Şemsanî Sheikh lineages.

Along with Sejadin, he is also revered as one of the two death angels who take Yazidi souls into the afterlife. Nasirdin is identified as the Angel of Death and Renewal while Sejadin plays the role of a psychopomp and Messenger of Death. They come to a person during his/her death whereupon Sejadin serves as a messenger of death, whereas Nasirdin is the hangman who separates the soul from the body. He is also portrayed as holding knife and as an executioner.

== See also ==
- List of Yazidi holy figures
- Sicadîn
