= Şêxûbekir =

Yazidi holy figure

- Member of the Heptad
- Venerated in: Yazidism
- Region: Kurdistan
- Ethnic group: Kurds (Yazidis)

Şêxûbekir (Kurdish: Şêxûbekir); also transliterated as Sheikhubekir, Sheikh Abu Bakr, Sheikh Obekr, or Sheikh Obekar, is a holy figure venerated in Yazidism. He was a close disciple of Sheikh Adi II ibn Abu'l Barakat and was a Feqîr, wearing the Xerqe and serving as the head of the dervishes. He is considered an incarnation of one of the Seven Divine Beings, to all of whom God assigned the World's affairs, and his 13th century earthly incarnation is considered the founding patriarch of the Qatani lineage of Sheikhs.

He is identified as the bearer and protector of Xerqe, a holy black textile which symbolizes asceticism in Yazidism. He is in charge of the equilibrium between earth and heaven. His brothers are Şêx Ebdilqadirê Rehmanî and Şêx Simayîlê Enzelî, who have their own separate Qatanî Sheikh branches.
