= Musa Sor =

Yazidi saint

- Mûsa Sor
- Other name: Sheikh Mûs
- Known for: Patron saint of lung and rheumatic diseases

Sheikh Mûsa Sor ("Red Moses"; also Şêx Mûs or Mūsē Sōr) is a Yazidi saint. He is also called the Lord of Air and Wind. Yazidis venerate him as the patron saint of lung and rheumatic diseases. A subdivision of the Adani Sheikh lineage is also named after him.

‘Ebdî Resho (‘Ebd Resh) was a companion of Sheikh Musa Sor.

Musa Sor is associated with winds and the air. He is invocated during winnowing so that winds can help separate grains from hay.

== Shrines ==
There is a mazār (shrine or sanctuary) dedicated to Musa Sor in Bahzani in the Lalish Valley of northern Iraq.
