= Fexredîn =

Yazidi saint

Melik Fexredîn
- Lord of the Moon
- Member of the Heptad
- Venerated in: Yazidism
- Symbol: Moon
- Region: Kurdistan

Genealogy
- Parents: Ezdina Mir (father); Sitiya Zin (mother)
- Siblings: Sheikh Shems, Nasirdîn, Sejadin
- Children: Şêx Mend, Xatûna Fexra, Şêx Bedir, Aqûb

Sheikh or Malak Fakhradin (Kurdish: Şêx Fexredîn, Melik Fexredîn) is a holy figure venerated in Yazidism, he is considered one of the Seven Divine Beings, to all of whom God assigned the World's affairs, and his earthly incarnation is considered one of the four sons of Ezdina Mir along with Nasirdin, Sheikh Shems, and Sejadin, who are the respective ancestors and patriarchs of the four Şemsanî Sheikh lineages and are considered to have been avatars of the angelic beings. Fexredîn is considered the personification of the Moon, while his brother, Sheikh Shems is the personification of the Sun.

Many Yazidi qewls (sacred hymns) are attributed to Fexredîn.

== Biography ==
Şêx Fexredîn was a Yezidi poet, philosopher and scholar who lived in the 12th century, he authored much of the poetry that is still recited among the Yezidis today in form of sacred hymns known as Qewls. According to Yazidi religious teachers and men, Fexredîn is said to have authored 11,000 qewls, beyts and qesîdes, of which only around 200 remain due to religious oppression and genocides.

=== Family ===
Fexreddin's father, Êzdîna Mîr, was a prominent 12th-century prince who ruled over the Yezidis, together with his wives Sitî Zîn and Sitî Ereb. Êzdîna Mîr was the father of the Yezidi saints Şêx Şems, Şêx Fexredîn, Şêx Nasirdîn and Şêx Sicadîn. Thus he is the forefather of all the Shamsanis.

Şêx Fexreddin had three sons and one daughter, his sons were Sheikh Bedir, Sheikh Aqub and the oldest of all, Sheikh Mend, who is an important Yezidi saint that became the ruler of Kilis Emirate and is today represented as the Lord of Snakes in the Yezidi religion.

There is a shrine in Ain Sifni dedicated to Sheikh Mend. Fexreddin's daughter was Xatûna Fexra, a female Yezidi saint represented as the Guardian of birth, pregnant women and therefore of fertility, Yezidi women fast once a year in her honor. Their descendants are still alive today and together also form their own Sheikh group within the Fexredîn group of the Shamsanis. The acting Baba Sheikh (Spiritual leader) of the Yezidis has to be from Fakhraddin lineage of Sheikhs. The current Baba Sheikh is Sheikh Ali Ilyas.

== See also ==
- List of Kurdish scholars
- List of Kurdish philosophers
