= Ezdina Mir =

Sheikh Ezdina Mir
- Êzdîne Mîr
- Era: Late Abbasid era
- Spouses: Sitiya Zin, Sitiya Ereb
- Children: The four Shemsani Sheikhs: Sheikh Shems, Fakhraddin, Nasirdin, and Sejadin

Ezdina Mir or Ezdine Mir (Kurdish: Êzdîne Mîr) is a Yazidi holy figure who was the father of Sheikh Shems, Fexredîn, Nasirdin, and Sejadin, making him the ancestor of all Şemsanî Sheikhs. According to Yazidi oral traditions, Sheikh Adi is said to have met Ezdina Mir when he first went to Lalish. He was married twice, first to Sitiya Zin, who was the daughter of Sheikh Adi, he later also married Sitiya Ereb.
