= Yezidism =

Monotheistic ethnoreligion of Yazidis

Yazidism ئێزدیاتی, Êzdîyatî
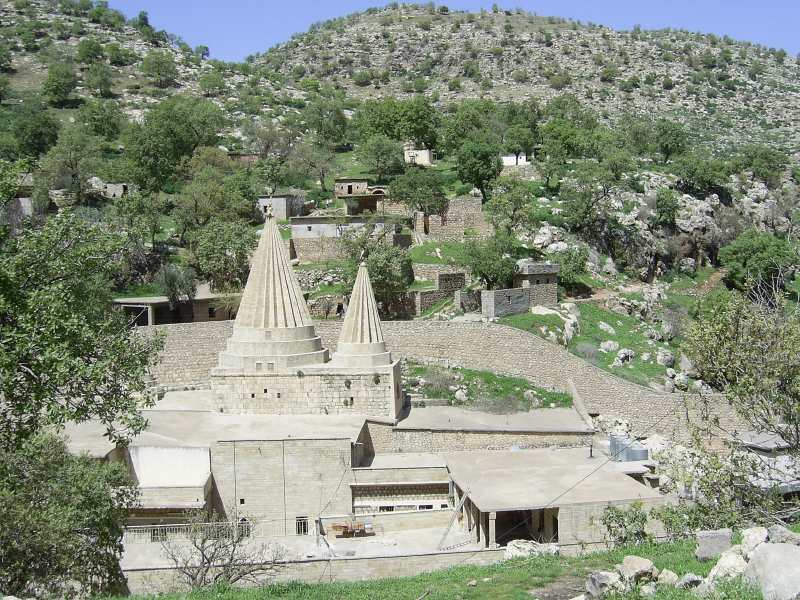
- The tomb of Sheikh Adi at Lalish, the holiest Yazidi temple
- Type: Ethnic religion
- Theology: Monotheistic
- Mir: Hazim Tahsin or Naif Dawud
- Baba Sheikh: Sheikh Ali Ilyas
- Language: Kurdish (Kurmanji)
- Headquarters: Lalish, Nineveh Plains, Iraq
- Other name: Sharfadin

Yazidism, or Yezidism (Note: Kurdish: ئێزدیتی, romanized: Êzdîtî or Êzdiyetî) also known as Sharfadin, (Note: Kurdish: شەرەفەدین, romanized: Şerfedîn) is a monotheistic ethnic religion. It developed through a complex historical process involving a pre-Islamic Kurdish religious substratum and the teachings of Sheikh Adi ibn Musafir. Scholars generally regard it as an independent religious tradition with deep roots in ancient Iranian beliefs, shaped by later Sufi influences. Its followers, called Yazidis, or Yezidis, are a Kurdish-speaking community. (Note: "The Yazidis’ cultural practices are observably Kurdish, and almost all speak Kurmanji (Northern Kurdish), with the exception of the villages of Baʿšiqa and Baḥzānēin northern Iraq, where Arabic is spoken. Kurmanji is the language of almost all the orally transmitted religious traditions of the Yazidis.")

Yazidism is based on belief in one God who created the world and entrusted its guardianship to seven self-emanated angels. Preeminent among these angels is Tawûsî Melek (lit. 'Peacock Angel'; also spelled Melek Taûs), who is the leader of the angels and has the greatest authority over the world.

== Etymology ==
The Yazidis' own name for themselves is Êzidî or, in some areas, Dasinî, although the latter, strictly speaking, is a tribal name. Some western scholars derive the name from the Umayyad Caliph Yazid ibn Muawiyah (Yazid I, r. 680 – 683 CE). However, all Yazidis reject any relationship between their name and the caliph. The word Yazidi means 'the servant of the creator'. Although Yazidism was not named after Yazid ibn Muawiyah, the caliph was revered in Yazidism. Other scholars derive it from Old Iranian yazata, Middle Persian yazad, "divine being". Another derivation of the word origin relates to Ez dā ('Created me'): Yazidis also refer to Xwedê ez dam ('God created me') and to Em miletê ezdaîn ('We are the Ezdayi nation').

== Principal beliefs ==
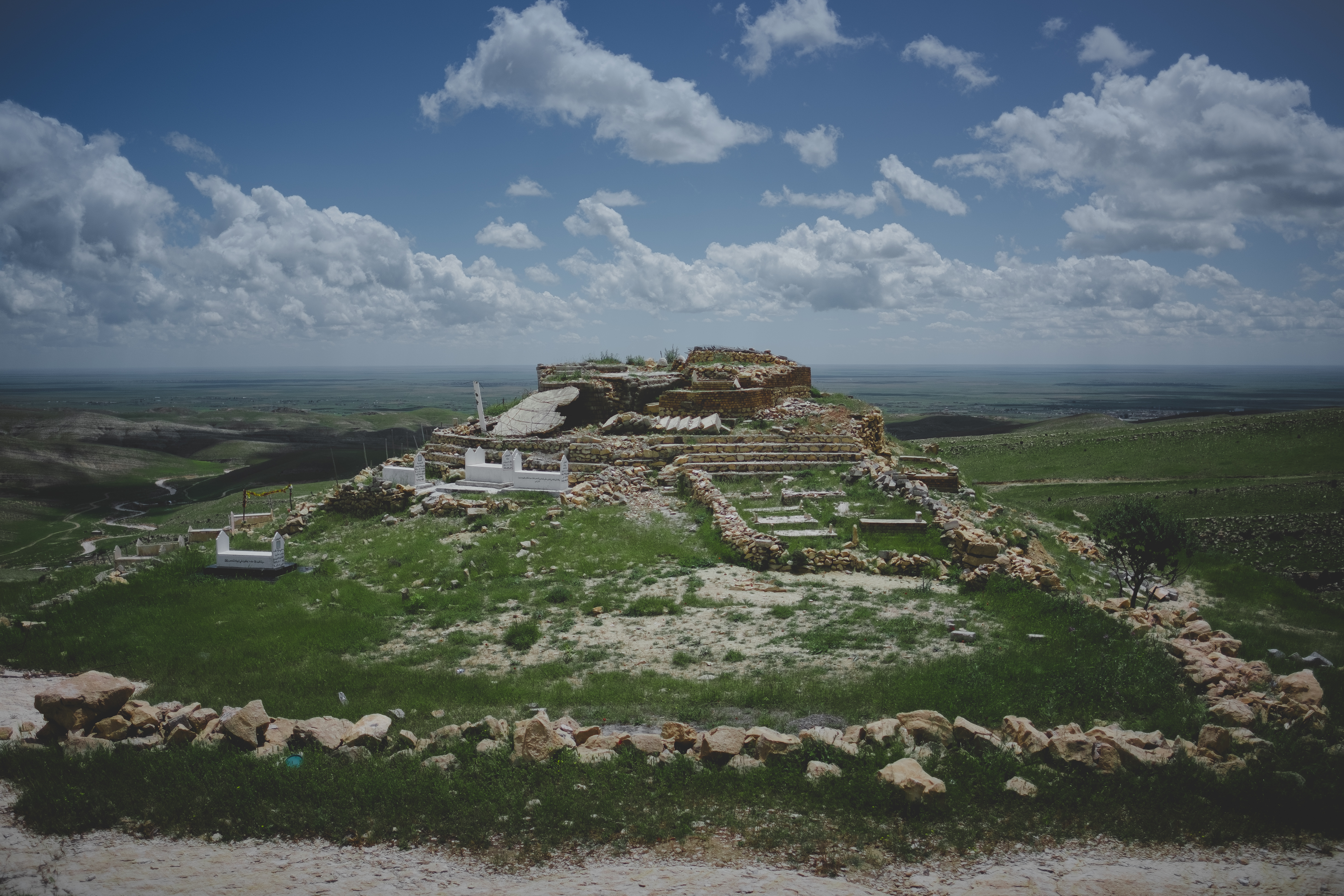
Yazidi shrine of Mame Reshan, partially destroyed by ISIL, in the Sinjar Mountains.

Yazidis believe in one God, to whom they refer as Xwedê, Xwedawend, Êzdan, Pedsha (lit. 'King'), and, less commonly, Ellah and Heq. According to some Yazidi hymns (known as qewls), God has 1,001 names; in others, he has 3,003 names. In Yazidism, fire, water, air, and the earth are sacred elements that are not to be polluted. During prayer, Yazidis face towards the Sun, which is why they were often called "sun worshippers". The Yazidi creation myth begins with the description of the emptiness and the absence of order in the Universe. Before the universe's creation, God created a dur ('white pearl') in spiritual form from his own pure light and alone dwelt in it. First, there was an esoteric world, and after that, an exoteric world was created. Before the creation of this world God created seven divine beings (oftentimes referred to as the Seven Angels in the Yazidi literature) to whom he assigned all the world's affairs; the leader of the Seven Angels was named Melek Taus (lit. 'Peacock Angel'; a.k.a. Tawûsî Melek). The end of Creation is closely connected with the creation of humankind and the transition from mythological to historical time.

=== Tawûsî Melek ===
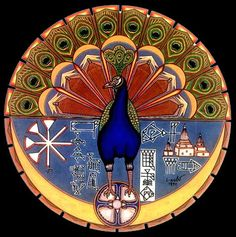
Melek Taûs, the Peacock Angel. This emblem features Tawûsê Melek in the center, the Sumerian diĝir on the left, and the domes above Sheikh 'Adī's tomb on the right.

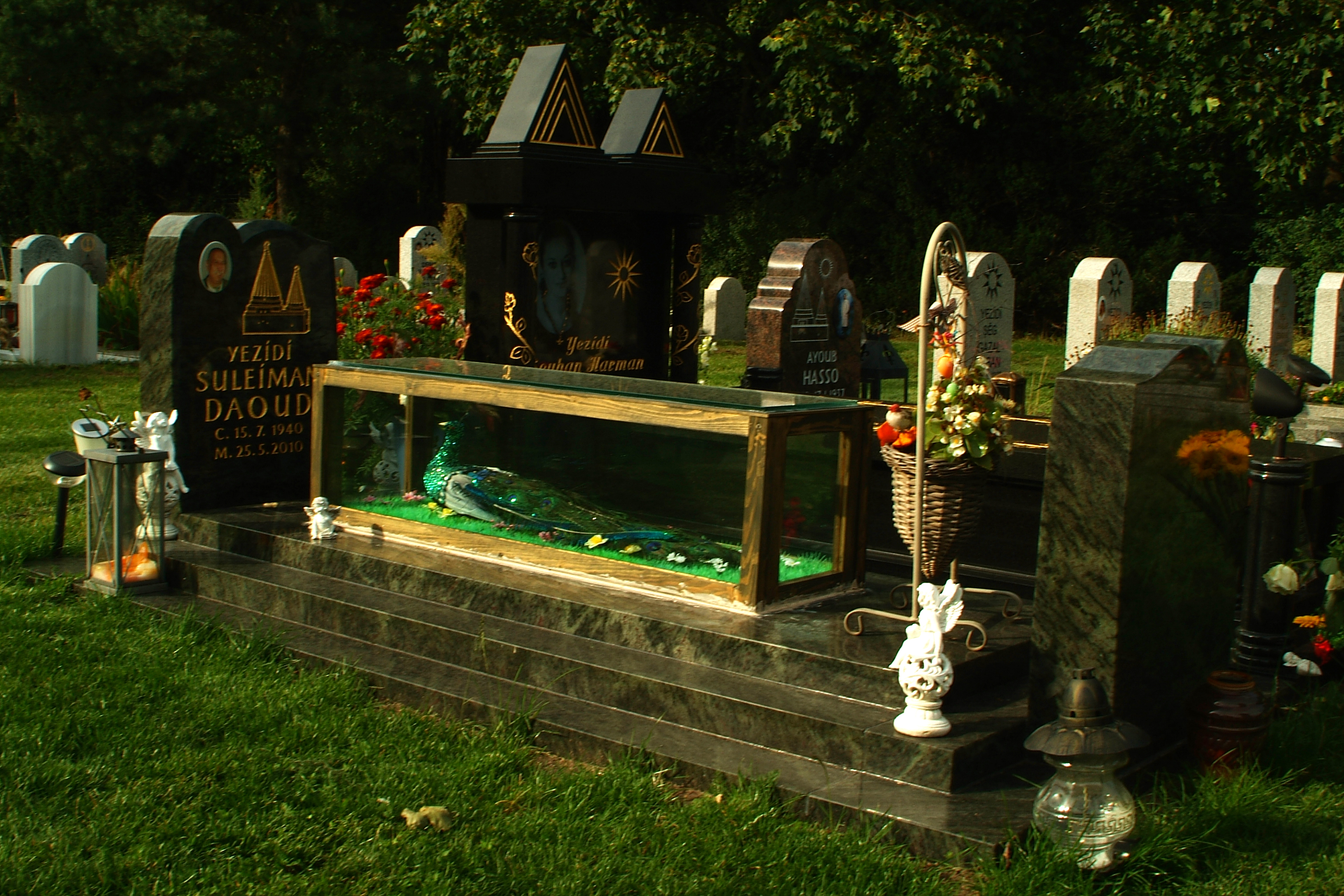
Tawûsî Melek depicted as a peacock inside the display case on the grave of a Yazidi believer, cemetery of the Yazidi community in Hanover.

The Yazidis believe in a divine triad. The supreme, hidden God of the Yazidis is considered to be remote and inactive in relation to his creation, except to contain and bind it together within his essence. His first emanation is Melek Taus (Tawûsî Melek), the "Peacock Angel", who functions as the ruler of the world. The second hypostasis of the divine triad is the Sheikh Adi ibn Musafir, and the third is Sultan Ezid. These are the three hypostases of the one God. The identity of these three is sometimes blurred, with ibn Musafir considered to be a manifestation of Tawûsî Melek and vice versa; the same also applies to Sultan Ezid. Yazidis are called Miletê Tawûsî Melek ('the nation of Tawûsî Melek').

Muslims and Christians have erroneously associated and identified the Peacock Angel with their own conception of the unredeemed evil spirit Satan, a misconception that has incited centuries of violent religious persecution of the Yazidis as "devil-worshippers". Persecution of Yazidis has continued in their home communities within the borders of modern Iraq.

Yazidis, however, believe Tawûsî Melek is not a source of evil or wickedness. They consider him to be the leader of the archangels, not a fallen angel.

The Yazidis of Kurdistan have been called many things, most notoriously 'devil-worshippers', a term used both by unsympathetic neighbours and fascinated Westerners. This sensational epithet is not only deeply offensive to the Yazidis themselves, but quite simply wrong. Non-Yazidis have associated Melek Taûs with Shaitan (Islamic/Arab name) or Satan, but Yazidis find that offensive and do not actually mention that name.

=== Sheikh Adi ===
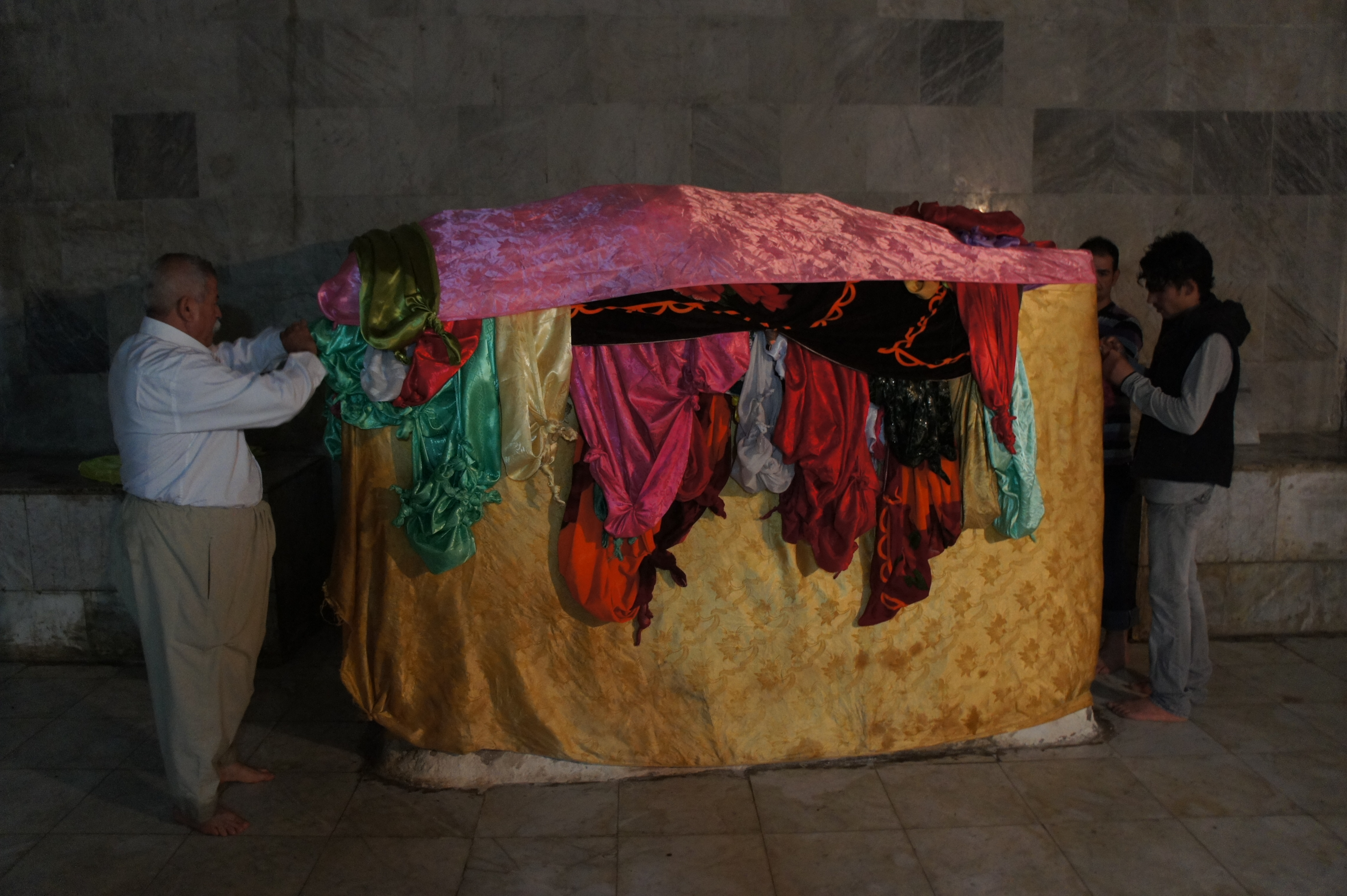
The sarcophagus of Sheikh Adi at Lalish

Sheikh Adi ibn Musafir (born 1072/1078, died 1162) was a 12th-century mystic, ascetic and theologian who is the central saint in the Yazidi religion, considered as the reformer, renewer or founder of Yazidism. His tomb at Lalish, Iraq is the holiest site in Yazidism and the focal point of annual Yazidi pilgrimage. In Yazidi belief, Sheikh Adi is venerated as an earthly incarnation of God.

Sheikh Adi's religious background is a subject of active debate. Islamic literature and Western scholarship traditionally describe him as a Sufi mystic of Islamic background who gathered followers known as the Adawiyya. Some scholars dispute this Islamic framing, and Yazidis themselves reject any claim of an Islamic background.

After settling at Lalish, Sheikh Adi united the scattered Yazidi tribes around him and returned to them their ancient temple, which members of other faiths had occupied. The Yazidi religion was revised and reestablished between the 12th and 13th centuries on the basis of Sheikh Adi's teachings, which drew from a mixture of ancient traditions and rites and blended them with the mysticism in which he believed. The caste structure that came to define Yazidi social and religious life is conventionally traced to Sheikh Adi's reforms: Sheikhs (şêx), who fulfill spiritual and administrative functions; Pirs (pîr), who fulfill religious and pastoral functions; and Murids (mirîd), the laypeople and followers.

Sheikh Adi occupies the central position in Yazidi religion as the earthly incarnation of God, a manifestation of God who descended into human form. His own poems are preserved in the oldest surviving Yazidi documents (mişûrs) dating to the 13th century, which are highly revered by Yazidis and express a pantheistic self-understanding and self-identification as God: "In the secret of my knowledge there is no God but me."

Following his departure, the leadership of the Yazidi community passed to his nephew Sakhr Abu l-Barakat ibn Sakhr al-Hakkari, whom Sheikh Adi had named as his successor. His descendants, the Adanî clan of sheikhs, continue to hold some senior religious offices of the community.

=== Holy figures ===
Yazidis believe in Seven Angels—considered the emanations of God—who, in the Yazidi creation myth, were created by God from his own light (nûr) before the creation of Earth. God assigned all of the world's affairs to the Seven Angels, and Tawûsî Melek was appointed as the leader. The angels are also referred to as Heft Sirr ('the Seven Mysteries'). The Seven Angels are believed to have parts of God in themselves. Another word that is used for this quality is sirr (or sur; lit. 'mystery'), which denotes a divine essence from which the angels were created. The divine essence has its own personality and will and is also called Sura Xudê ('the Sur of God'). This term refers to the essence of the Divine itself (i.e., God), which the angels share with God. In Yazidism's religious literature, the Seven Angels are sometimes referred to as Cibrayîl, Ezrayîl, Mîkayîl, Şifqayîl, Derdayîl, Ezafîl, and Ezazîl. Figures other than the Angels are better known by their earthly incarnations: Fexredîn, Sheikh Shems, Nasirdîn, Sicadîn, Şêxûbekir, and Şêxisin.

The Yazidi pantheon contains a total of 365 holy figures, designated by religious terms including Xudan, Xas, Mêr and Babçak. Yazidi theology holds that God is almighty and absolute, and that the Xudans are part of his power. Moreover, regarding the natural world, Yazidis believe in Xudans, which correspond to most natural elements and phenomena; they are regarded as divine powers that control these phenomena. In Yazidi mythology, the Xudans appeared after the creation of the world for the four elements of nature and their manifestations.

=== Rebirth and concept of time ===
Yazidis believe in the rebirth of the soul. Like adherents of Ahl-e Haqq, the Yazidis use the metaphor of a change of garment to describe the process, which plays an exceptional role in Yazidi religiosity and is called the "chang[ing] of [one's] shirt" (kirasgorîn). There is also a belief that some events repeat themselves in a wheel of time. In Yazidism, different concepts of time coexist:

- An esoteric time sphere (enzel). This term denotes a state of being before the creation of the world. According to Yazidi cosmogony, there is God and a pearl in this stage.
- Bedîl or dewr (a cyclic course of time): it means literally 'change, changing' or 'turning, revolution' and in the Yazidi context denotes a new period of time in the history of the world. Therefore, it may also mean 'renewing' or 'renewed' and designates the start of a renewed period of time.
- A linear course, which runs from the start of the creation by God to the collective eschatological end point.
- Three tofan ('storm' or 'flood'; i.e., disasters), which are intended to play a purificatory role, improving the quality of life. Each catastrophe, which ultimately brings renewal to the world, takes place through a classical element: the first through water (tofanê avê), the second through fire (tofanê agirî), and the last is connected with wind or air (tofanê ba). It is believed that the first tofan has already occurred in the past and that the next tofan will occur through fire. According to this perception, the three sacred elements, namely water, fire, and air, purify the fourth one, the earth. These events, however, are not considered eschatological. They occur throughout a person's life. Although the purificatory events cause many deaths, ultimately life continues.

In Yazidism, the older original concept of metempsychosis and the cyclic perception of the course of time is harmonised and coexists with the younger idea of a collective eschatology.

=== Cosmogony and beginning of life ===
The Yazidi creation myth is recorded in several sacred texts and traditions. It can therefore only be inferred and understood through an overall view of the sacred texts and traditions. The cosmogony can be divided into three stages:

1. Enzel – the state before the pearl burst (dur).
2. Developments immediately after the burst – cosmogony
3. The creation of the earth and man – anthropogony

The term Enzel is one of the most frequently mentioned in religious vocabulary and appears numerous times in the religious hymns, known as Qewls. For instance, in Qewlê Tawisî Melek:

"Ya Rebî ji Enzel de her tuyî qedîmî" ('Oh, Creator of the Enzel, you are infinite')

And Dûa Razanê:

Ezdayî me, ji direke enzelî me ('I am a follower of God, I come from an "enzelî" [pearl])

Thus, the term Enzel can also be referred to as a "pure, spiritual, immaterial and infinite world", "the Beyond", or "the sphere beyond the profane world". The Enzel stage describes a spaceless and timeless state and therefore illustrates a supernatural state. In this stage, initially there is only a God, who creates a pearl out of his own light, in which his shining throne (textê nûrî) is located.

Qewlê Bê Elif:

Padşê min bi xo efirandî dura beyzaye (My King created the white pearl from himself)

Textê nûrî sedef (The shining throne in the pearl)

The Yazidi qewls describe God, called Xwedê, Padishah ("King") or Sultan Ezid, as creating the world from his own essence and from light. In the accounts centred on the Pearl, God speaks the creative command "Be!", makes a Pearl and dwells in it, then separates it from himself. The Pearl takes on red, white and yellow colours and bursts, and its water spreads as a boundless sea. God then creates seven angels, one on each day of creation, and appears to them as Tawûsî Melek, the "Peacock Angel". He builds a ship and sails over the sea with four companions, who are later named as saints, and lands at the site of Lalish. There he throws leaven into the water, and vapour rises and becomes the seven heavens. The earth then appears, but it remains barren for forty years until Lalish descends from heaven and the land is covered with plants. Other stages named in the qewls include the Tablet and the Pen, the Throne, a Tree with its roots in the air, a Lamp that is the source of souls, and the Robe (xirqe) woven of light and love.

In that passage the voyage serves to appoint the four companions as rulers of the world and to bring creation to Lalish. Elsewhere in the qewls the same image is used for the soul's passage through life. The world is likened to a sea, and a person who has a spiritual guide, the "brother of the hereafter", is said to cross "the ocean of immeasurable depths" aboard a ship. The sea and ship are therefore generally understood as symbols of the world and the means of crossing it

The seais theologically interpreted as a symbol of materiality and of the multiplicity and dynamism of the universe, while light symbolises the spiritual. The Pearl, by contrast, is described as an undivided archetype of all being, spiritual and phyysical, and its changing colours showing that everything is already contained in it. The primordial sea is understood as a prefiguration of the universe, a set of possibilities from which creation develops, since it exists before the seven heavens. In one qewl the Pearl is drawn from a hidden treasure, which has been read as the passage of being from potential to actual.

Adam, the first man, is shaped from four elements (fire, earth, water and wind) between a Saturday and the following Friday. His body lies lifeless for seven centuries, until seven angelic powers (surr) stand around it holding cups. His soul declines to enter the body until music, played with the "saz" and "qudum" instruments, descends from heaven. When it does, Adam drinks from the cup, sneezes, wakes with flesh, skin and blood, and is taken by the angels into Paradise.

God is presented as Light and Love, with love as his first attribute and the motive of creation. Several qewls state that the souls of the Yazidis, called sunat ("tradition") and also described as the "seed of angels", existed before creation and conversed with God in love. The world came into being after they asked him to show mercy and to bring love into being, and God then gave them law and statute..

Yazidi accounts of the creation differ significantly from those of the Abrahamic religions (e.g., Judaism, Christianity, and Islam), since they are derived from the Ancient Mesopotamian and Indo-Iranian traditions; Yazidi cosmogony is closer to those of Ancient Iranian religions, Yarsanism, and Zoroastrianism.

=== The Creation of Humanity ===
Yazidism regards Adam and Eve as the first humans; however, its account of their creation can be traced to Gnostic Christian and Sethian influences. Yazidis regard Adam and Eve as the ancestors of most of humanity, while the Yazidis are descendents of Adam alone. According to their creation account, in a competition to determine whom is the true origin of human life, Adam and Eve each placed their own "seed" in a jar; Eve's jar was corrupted while Adam's jar contained Shahid bin-Jarr, his son. Yazidi tradition regards the Yazidi people as descendents of this son, Shahid, alone.

== Yazidi sacred texts ==
The religious literature of Yazidis is composed mostly of poetry which is orally transmitted in mainly Kurmanji and includes numerous genres, such as Qewl (religious hymn), Beyt (poem), Du‛a (prayer), Dirozge (another kind of prayer), Şehdetiya Dîn (the Declaration of the Faith), Terqîn (prayer for after a sacrifice), Pişt perde (literally 'under the veil', another genre), Qesîde (Qasida), Sema‛ (literally 'listening'), Lavĳ, Xerîbo, Xizêmok, Payîzok, and Robarîn. The poetic literature is composed in an advanced and archaic language where more complex terms are used, which may be difficult to understand for those who are not trained in religious knowledge. Therefore, they are accompanied by some prosaic genres of the Yazidi literature that often interpret the contents of the poems and provide explanations of their contexts in the spoken language comprehensible to the common population. The prosaic genres include Çîrok and Çîvanok (legends and myths), and Dastan and Menal Pîrs (interpretations of religious hymns). Yazidis also possess some written texts, such as the sacred manuscripts called mişûrs and individual collections of religious texts called cilvê and Keşkûl, although they are rarer and often safekept among Yazidis. Yazidis are also said to have two holy books, Book of Revelation and Black Book whose authenticities are debated among scholars.

=== Holy books ===
The Yazidi holy books are claimed to be the Book of Revelation and Black Book. Scholars generally agree that the manuscripts of both books published in 1911 and 1913 were forgeries written by non-Yazidis in response to Western travellers' and scholars' interest in the Yazidi religion; however, the material in them is consistent with authentic Yazidi traditions. True texts of those names may have existed, but remain obscure. The real core texts of the religion that exist today are the hymns known as qawls; they have also been orally transmitted during most of their history, but are now being collected with the assent of the community, effectively transforming Yazidism into a scriptural religion. The sacred texts had already been translated into English by the early 20th century.

=== Qewls ===
Qewls are the sacred hymns of the Yazidis and the most authoritative form of Yazidi religious literature. They are composed mostly in Kurmanji and have been handed down chiefly by oral transmission among the Yazidi clergy, who sing them to set melodies at religious rites and festivals. The corpus is large and covers the creation of the world, the nature of God, ethics, the fate of the soul after death, and the lives of holy figures. Yazidism has no single written scripture, as such, the qewls fill that role.

In Yazidi belief the qewls were given to the community not through prophets but directly by God and by angels who appeared in human form, thus carrying the highest authority. The present corpus is mainly attributed to Şêx Fexredîn and other disciples of Sheikh Adi.

=== Mishur ===
Mishurs are a type of sacred manuscripts that were written down in the 13th century and handed down to each lineage (ocax) of the Pirs; each of the manuscripts contain descriptions of the founder of the Pir lineage that they were distributed to, along with a list of Kurdish tribes and other priestly lineages that were affiliated with the founder. The mishurs are safekept among the families of Pirs in particular places that are designated for their safekeeping; these places are referred to as stêr in Kurmanji. According to the Yazidi tradition, there are a total of 40 mishurs which were distributed to the 40 lineages of Pirs.

== Festivals ==
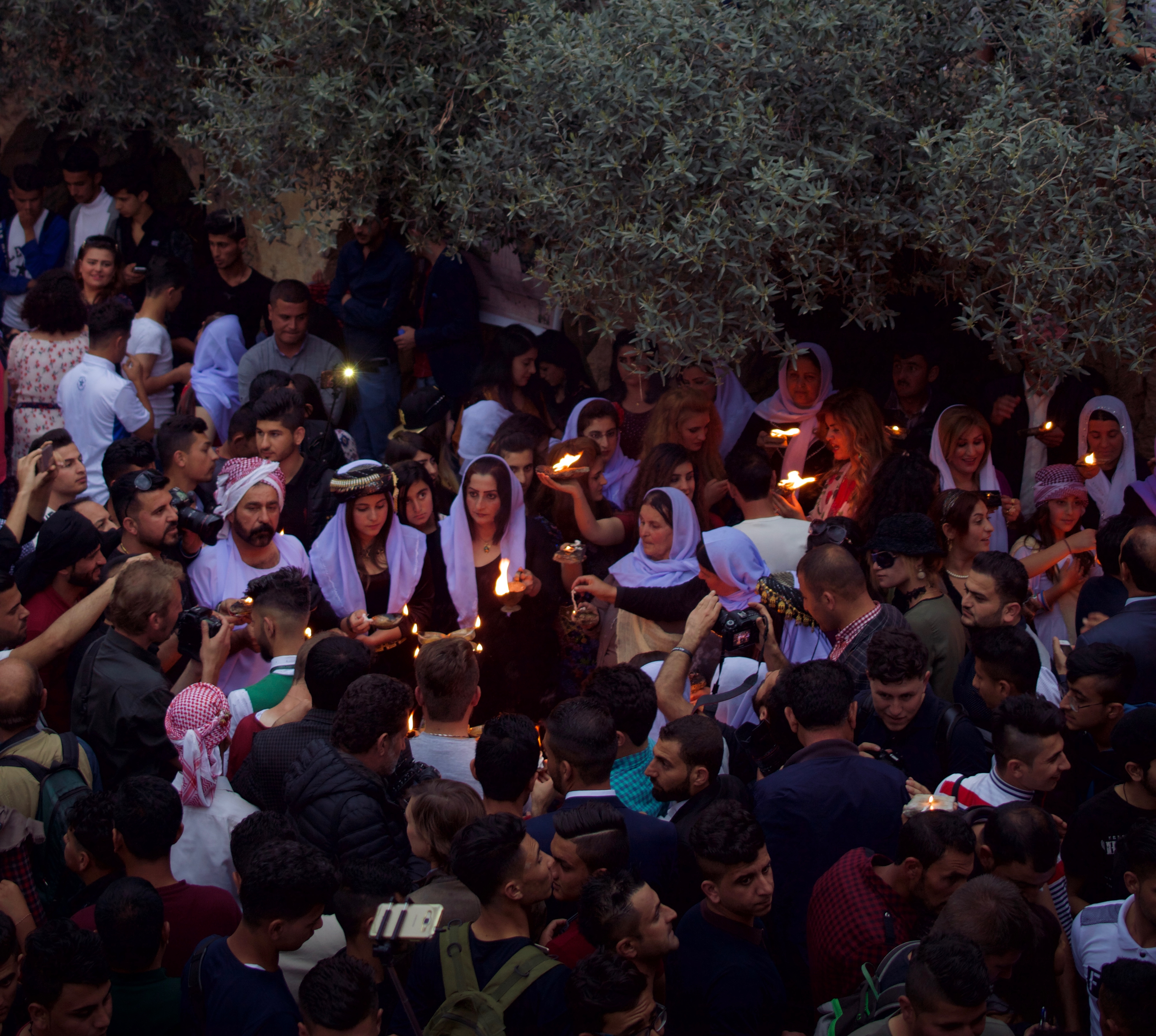
Pilgrims celebrating the Yazidi New Year festival at Lalish, Iraqi Kurdistan

=== Yazidi New Year ===
The Yazidi New Year (Sersal) is called Çarşema sor ("Red Wednesday") or Çarşema Serê Nîsanê ("Wednesday at the beginning of April"). It falls in spring, on the first Wednesday of the April and Nîsan months in the Julian and Seleucid calendars, i.e. the first Wednesday on or after 14 April according to the Gregorian calendar.

=== Feast of Êzî ===
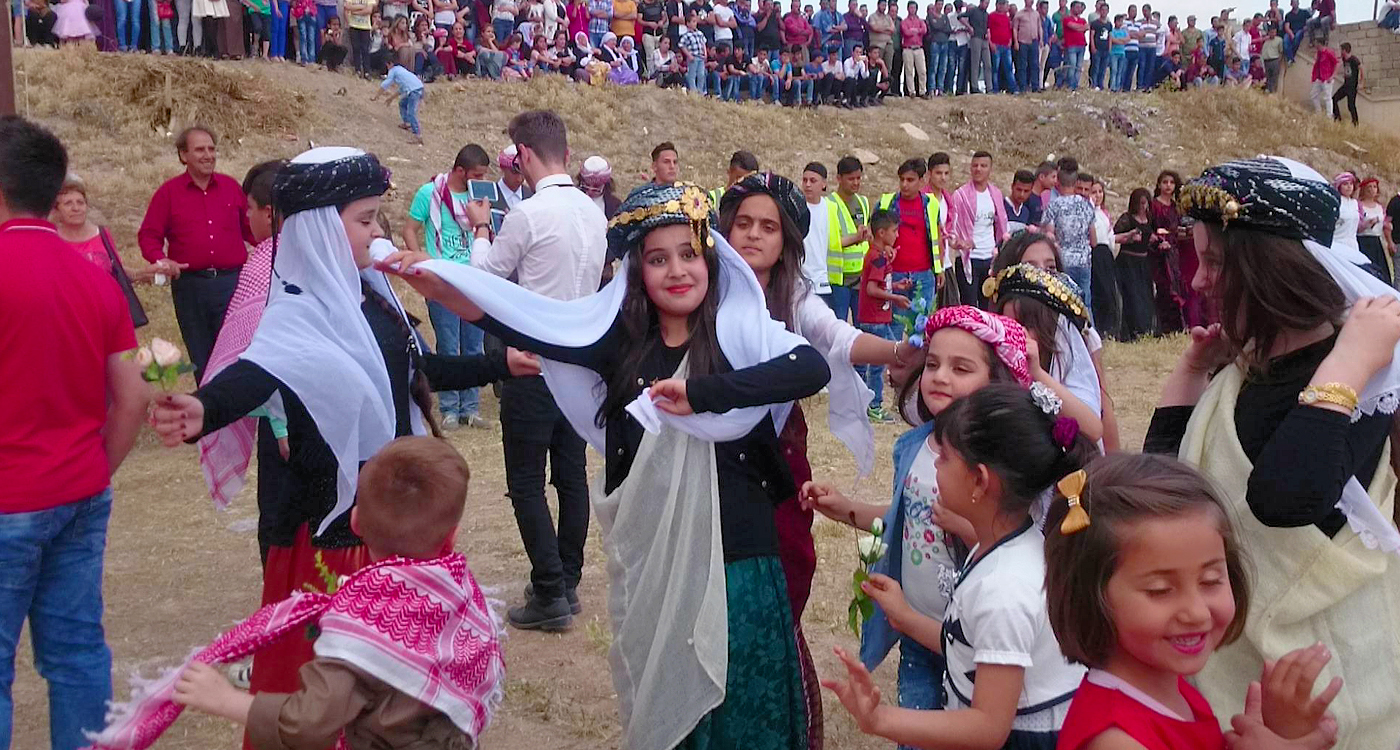
Yazidis celebrating a Yazidi ceremony called Tawwaf in the town of Bashiqa in Iraq.

One of the most important Yazidi festivals is Îda Êzî ("Feast of Êzî"), which is celebrated in commemoration of the divine figure Sultan Ezid. Which every year takes place on the first Friday on or after 14 December. Before this festival, the Yazidis fast for three days, where nothing is eaten from sunrise to sunset. The Îda Êzî festival is celebrated in honor of God and the three days of fasting before are also associated with the ever shorter days before the winter solstice, when the Sun is less and less visible. With the Îda Êzî festival, the fasting time is ended. The festival is often celebrated with music, food, drinks and dance.

=== Tawûsgeran ===
Another important festival is the Tawûsgeran, where Qewals and other religious dignitaries visit Yazidi villages, bringing the sinjaq, sacred images of a peacock symbolizing Tawûsê Melek. These are venerated, fees are collected from the pious, sermons are preached and holy water and berat (small stones from Lalish) distributed.

=== Feast of the Assembly ===
The greatest festival of the year is the Cêjna Cemaiya ('Feast of the Assembly'), which includes an annual pilgrimage to the tomb of Sheikh 'Adī' (Şêx Adî) in Lalish, northern Iraq. The festival is celebrated from 6 October to 13 October, in honor of the Sheikh Adi. It is an important time for cohesion.

If possible, Yazidis make at least one pilgrimage to Lalish during their lifetime, and those living in the region try to attend at least once a year for the Feast of the Assembly in autumn.

=== Tiwaf ===
Tiwafs are yearly feasts of shrines and their holy beings which constitute an important part of Yazidi religious and communal life. Every village that contains a shrine holds annual tiwafs in the name of the holy being to which the shrine is dedicated.

== Religious practices ==
=== Prayers ===
Prayers occupy a special status in Yazidi literature. They contain important symbols and religious knowledge connected with the Holy Men, God, and daily situations. The prayers are mostly private and as a rule they are not performed in public. Yazidis pray towards the sun, usually privately, or the prayers are recited by one person during a gathering. The prayers are classified according to their own content. There are:

- Prayers dedicated to God and holy beings
- Prayers of Yazidi castes
- Prayers for specific occasions
- Rite of passage prayers
- Prayers against health problems and illnesses
- Daily prayers
- Prayers connected with the nature, i.e. the Moon, stars, Sun, etc.

=== Customs ===
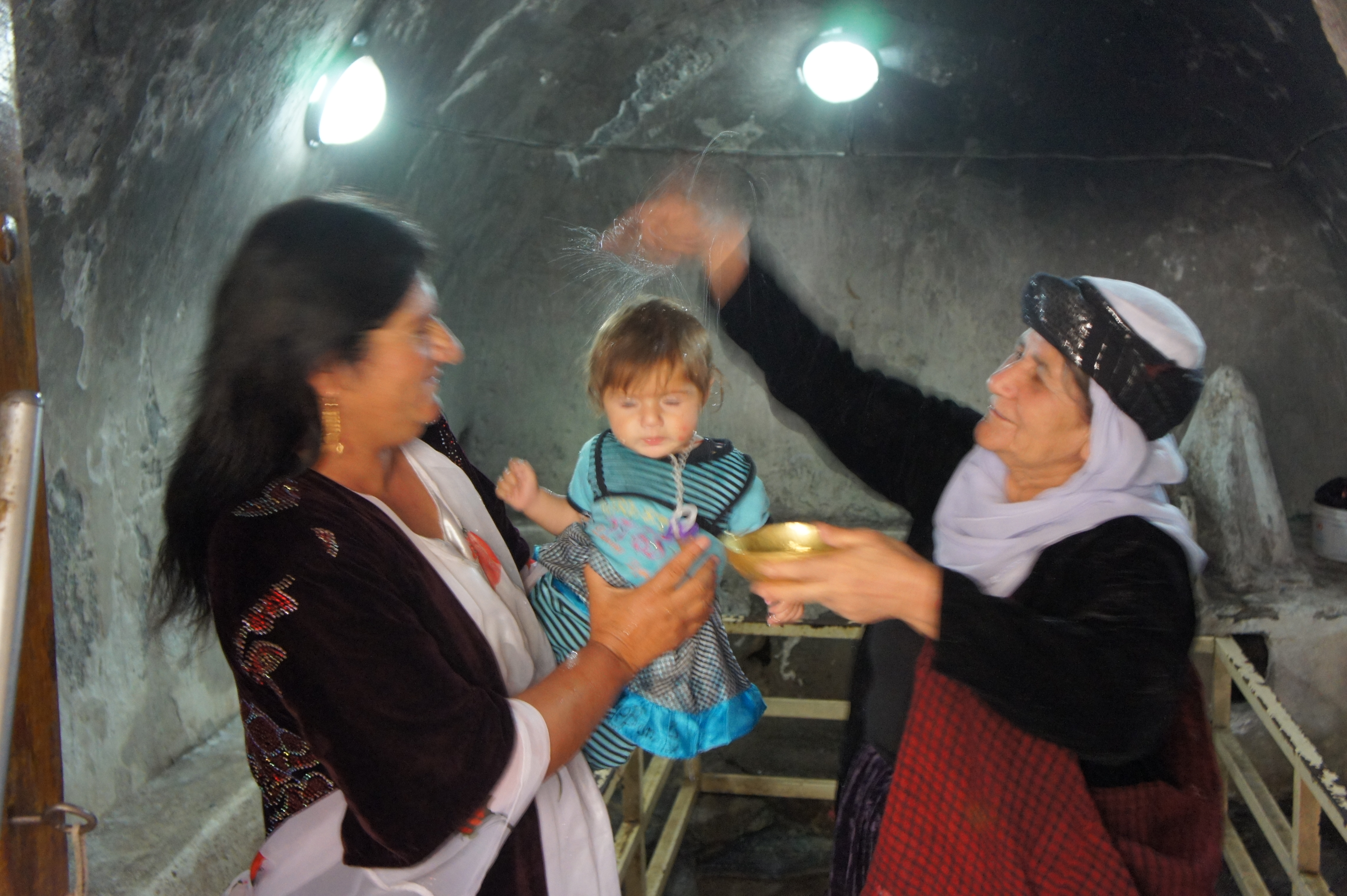
Baptism of a Yazidi child in Lalish

Children are baptised at birth and circumcision is not required, but is practised by some due to regional customs. The Yazidi baptism is called mor kirin (literally: 'to seal'). Traditionally, Yazidi children are baptised at birth with water from the Kaniya Sipî ('White Spring') at Lalish. It involves pouring holy water from the spring on the child's head three times.

=== Purity and taboos ===
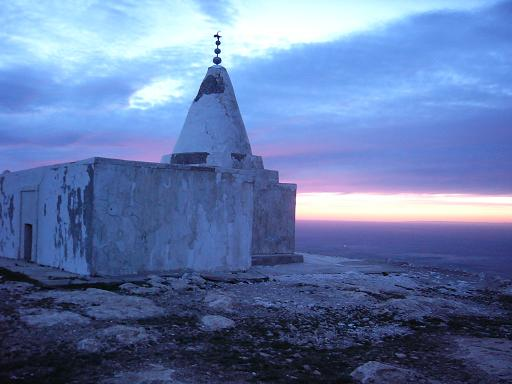
The Chel Mera Temple, or "40 Men Temple", on the highest peak of the Sinjar Mountains in northern Iraq. The temple is so old that no one remembers how it came to have that name, but it is believed to derive from the burial of forty men on the mountaintop site.

Many Yazidis consider pork to be prohibited. However, many Yazidis living in Germany began to view this taboo as a foreign belief from Judaism or Islam and not part of Yazidism, and therefore abandoned this rule. Furthermore, in a BBC News interview in April 2010, Baba Sheikh, the spiritual leader of all Yazidis, stated that ordinary Yazidis may eat what they want, but the religious clergy refrain from certain vegetables (including cabbage) because "they cause gases".

Some Yazidis in Armenia and Georgia who converted to Christianity, still identify as Yazidis even after converting, but are not accepted by the other Yazidis as Yazidis.

== Religious organisation ==
The Yazidis are strictly endogamous; members of the three Yazidi castes, the murids, sheikhs, and pirs, marry only within their group.

There are several religious duties that are performed by several dignitaries, such as the Mir Hejj (Prince of the Pilgrimage), Sheikh el-Wazir (who oversees the sanctuary of Sheikh Shems at Lalish), Pire Esbiya (treasurer of the sanctuary of Sheikh Shems at Lalish), Mijewir (local shrine custodian), Baba Chawush (guardian of the sanctuary of Sheikh Adi), and others.

== See also ==
- Index of articles related to the Yezidis
- List of Yazidi holy places
- List of Yazidi saints
- List of Yazidi settlements
- Persecution of Yazidis
