= List of Yezidi holy places =

This is a list of Yazidi temples across the world (primarily in modern-day Armenia, Georgia, northern Iraq, and Turkey).

== Background ==
Yazidis are an ethnoreligious group who live predominantly in Iraq. Their religion is known as Yazidism.

== List ==
Name	Location	Image	Notes
Lalish temple	Nineveh Governorate, Iraq		The location of the tomb of the Sheikh Adi ibn Musafir, a central figure of the Yazidi faith and considered the holiest of Yazidi temples.
Sharfadin temple	Sinjar, Iraq		800 year old temple considered by Yazidis as one of the holiest places on earth. Dedicated to Sherfedin.
Chel Mera (Chermera) or "40 Men" Temple	Mount Sinjar, Iraq		Considered one of the holiest of Yazidi temples, located on the highest peak in Sinjar mountains, Iraq
Makan Sheikh Adi	Sinjar, Iraq		Located near Sardashte Camp on top of Mount Sinjar, where Shekh Adi visited before going to Lalish.
Ziarat temple	Aknalich, Armenia		Ziarat or Ziyarat temple is the first Yazidi temple in Armenia. It literally means "Pilgrimage Temple." The temple was consecrated in 2012.
Quba Mêrê Dîwanê temple	Aknalich, Armenia		The world's largest Yazidi temple dedicated to the angel Melek Taus and the Seven Angels of Yazidi theology. The temple was consecrated in 2019.
Shekhubekir (Şêxûbekir) temple	Rya Taza, Armenia		In December 2020, a Yezidi cleric from the Lalish holy site located in Iraq blessed a newly built temple named after Shekhubekir (Şêxûbekir) which is open to the public.
Bacin Temple	Güven (Bacin), Turkey		Temple in Güven, Midyat, Mardin Province, southeastern Turkey
Quba Haji Ali Temple	Ba'adra, Iraq		
Khiz Rahman Shrine	Baadre, Iraq		Shrine of Khiz Rahman in Baadre
Sultan Ezid Temple	Tbilisi, Georgia		Temple modelled on the Lalish temple, located in Tbilisi, Georgia. The temple was consecrated in 2015.
Quba Xatuna Fexra	Mağara (Kiwex), Turkey		Quba Xatuna Fexra (Temple of Khatuna Fekhra) in Mağara, İdil, Şırnak Province, southeastern Turkey. Dedicated to Khatuna Fekhra.
Quba Pire Ewra	Sinjar, Iraq		Quba Pire Ewra ("Pir of the people") Temple in Sinjar, Iraq
Şexsê Batê	Babira, Iraq		Shrine of Shekhse Bate in Babera village, Iraq
Quba Sheikh Mand	Sinjar, Iraq		Shrine in the southern part of Sinjar, Iraq. Dedicated to Sheikh Mand.
Shrine of Nishingaha Peroz	Ain Sifni, Iraq		Ezidi shrine of Nishingaha Peroz near Ain Sifni, Duhok Governorate.
Khatarah Temple	Khatarah, Iraq		
Dughata Temple	Dughata, Iraq		
Sreshka Temple	Sreshka, Iraq		
Khoshaba Temple	Khoshaba, Iraq		In Khoshaba, Iraq
Malak Miran Temple	Bashiqa, Iraq		Dedicated to the angel Malak Miran, the temple is located about 9 miles east of Mosul, the temple was restored and reopened on 12 January 2018 after being destroyed by ISIL terrorists in 2014.
Shrine of Mohamed Rashan	Bardarash, Iraq		Shrine part of Yazidi temple complex on a mountainside facing the Erbil-Duhok road. Dedicated to Mehmed Reshan.
Mam Rashan Shrine	Mount Sinjar, Iraq		Temple dedicated to Mam Rashan, a saint associated with agriculture, rain, and the annual harvest. The temple is estimated to date back to the 12th century. Dedicated to Mehmed Reshan.
Shebl Qasim Shrine	Sinjar, Iraq		
Pire Zirav Temple	Cinerya, Turkey	Yazidi temple in a cemetery in Cinerya	The location of the tomb is near Zewa Mira of Xalta

== See also ==
Media related to Yazidi shrines in Iraq at Wikimedia Commons

- List of Yazidi holy figures
- List of Yazidi settlements
