= Raad (name) =

Raad is a surname and a masculine given name of Arabic origin. Notable people with the name include:

== Given name ==
- Raad Ghantous, Iraqi interior designer
- Raad Hammoudi (born 1958), Iraqi football player
- Raad Mohiaddin (born 1957), British physician
- Raad Salam Naaman (born 1959), Iraqi-born Spanish author, academic and politician
- Ra'ad Sa'ad (1972–2025), Hamas senior commander
- Raad Mutar Saleh (died 2006), leader of the Mandaean community in Iraq
- Raad Shakir (born 1948), Iraqi British physician and academic
- Ra'ad bin Zeid (born 1936), member of the Jordanian royal family Hashemites

== Surname ==
- Haidar Raad (born 1991), Iraqi football player
- Ignace Raad (1923–1999), Lebanese Archbishop of the Melkite Greek Catholic Archeparchy of Sidon
- Iqbal Raad (died 2000), Pakistani lawyer
- Joe Raad (born 1985), Lebanese musical artist
- Khalid Raad, Syrian economist and politician
- Khalil Raad (1854–1957), Palestinian photographer
- Mohammad Raad (born 1955), Lebanese politician
- Ouday Raad (born 1966), Lebanese actor
- Tammam Raad (born 1965), Syrian politician
- Trude Raad (born 1990), Norwegian track and field athlete
- Walid Raad (born 1967), Lebanese media artist

== See also ==
- Raad (disambiguation)
