= Pir Mehmed Reshan =

Yazidi saint

- Lord of the rain and protector of harvest
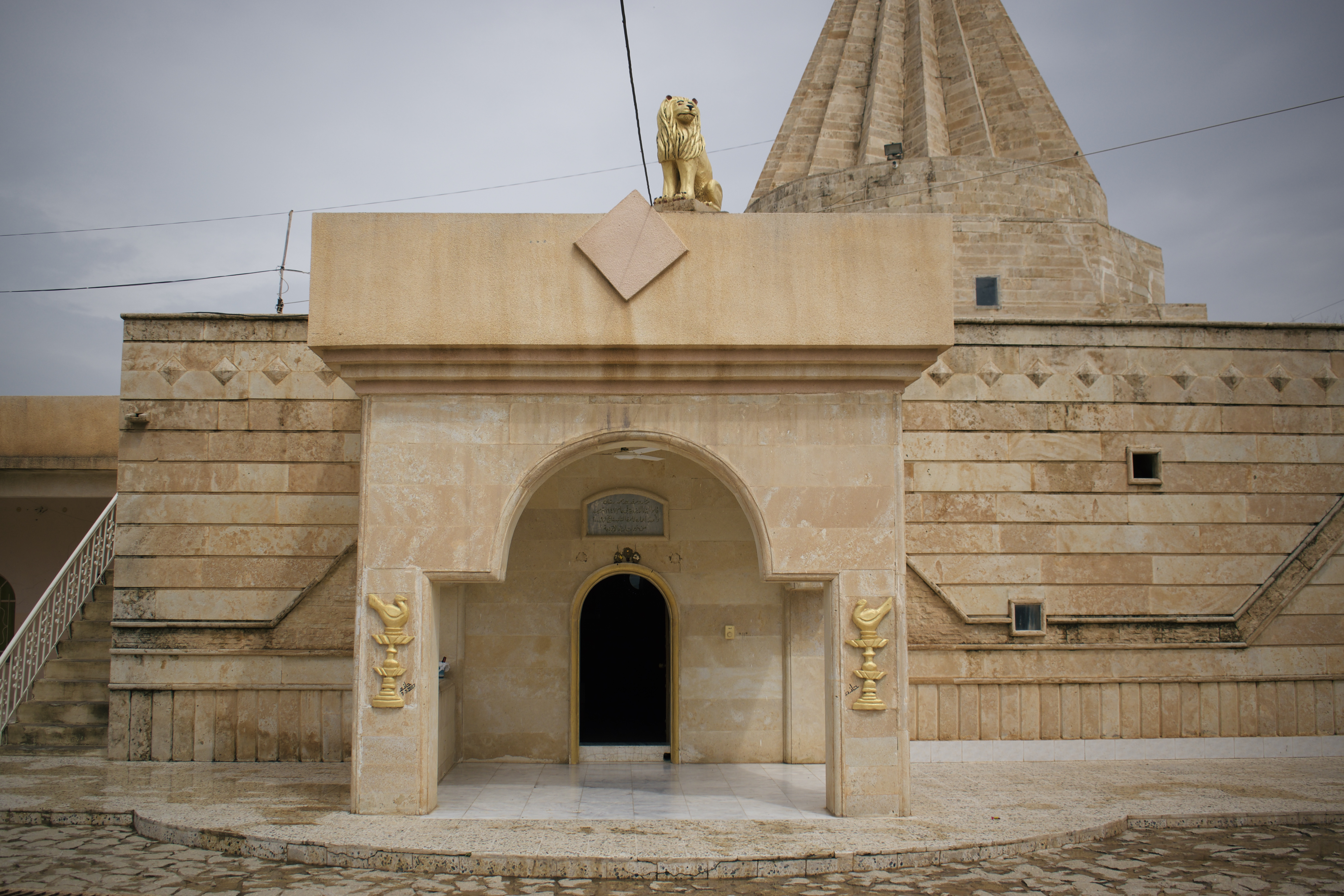
- View of the shrine of Pir Mehmed Rashan, adjacent to Maqlub Mountain near Bardarash
- Other names: Şêr Memê Reşan ('Lion Memê Reşan')
- Venerated in: Yazidism
- Animals: Patron of cats
- Mount: Lion; In Yazidi religious texts, Memê Reşan is called Şêr Memê Reşan ('Lion Memê Reşan'), because there is a storyline about Memê Reşan, who, to show his power, saddled a stone, which then turned into a lion.
- Region: Kurdistan
- Ethnic group: Kurds (Yazidis)

Pir Mehmed Rashan or Pir Mehmed Reshan (Kurdish: Pîr Mehmed Reşan, Pîr Memê Reşan, Pîr Mamreşan) was a 12th-century Yazidi saint (Pîr). The Mam Rashan Shrine on Mount Sinjar was built in honor of him.

As a patron saint of agriculture, he is considered to be the protector of harvests and bringer of rain. His feast is celebrated in spring. There is a shrine dedicated to him at Lalish. Also, a shrine that is claimed as his tomb is situated behind Mount Maqlub near Bardarash, Iraq. During times of drought, special ceremonies are held at sites dedicated to him to pray for rain and blessing of cultivated land.

== See also ==
- List of Yazidi holy figures
- List of Yazidi holy places
