= Mirza Sloyan =

Armenian-born Yezidi businessman and philanthropist (1946–2019)

- Russian: Мирза Чолоевич Слоян
- Born: 1946; Armenian SSR, Soviet Union
- Died: 3 November 2019; Munich, Germany
- Resting place: Aknalich, Armavir Province, Armenia
- Education: Yerevan State Agricultural Institute
- Occupations: Businessman, philanthropist
- Known for: Funding the Quba Mêrê Dîwanê; sponsoring Lalish TV; founding the Yezidi Congress
- Children: 3
- Relatives: Mraz Sloyan (nephew)

Mirza Sloyan (Russian: Мирза Чолоевич Слоян; Armenian: Միրզա Սլոյան; also known as Mirza Cholo, Kurmanji: Mîrza Çolo; 1946 – 3 November 2019) was an Armenian-born Yezidi businessman and philanthropist who lived in Moscow.

He made his money in Russia, where he worked in construction and property and had shopping and trade premises in Moscow. He financed the Ziarat temple at Aknalich, consecrated in 2012 as the first Yezidi temple in the post-Soviet world, and Quba Mêrê Dîwanê, a larger temple complex in the same village that opened in 2019 and is described as the largest Yezidi temple in the world. In Russia he sponsored Lalish TV, a Yezidi satellite channel that began broadcasting in Moscow in 2016, and founded the Yezidi Congress, an all-Russian Yezidi organization created the same year. After the Islamic State attack on Sinjar in August 2014, he gave money to and helped organize relief for Yezidi refugees. He died in Munich five weeks after the opening of Quba Mêrê Dîwanê and is buried at the Aknalich complex.

== Early life and education ==
Sloyan was born in autumn 1946 in Echmiadzin (Vagharshapat) in the Armenian SSR.

His parents had moved to Echmiadzin from the Iğdır area of Western Armenia, and his father had served in the Imperial Russian Army. The family came from the village of Kyullug in Surmalu and left for the territory of what became the First Republic of Armenia during World War I, losing relatives in attacks by Ottoman Turkish and Kurdish forces. He was one of eight sons; a sister died at the age of thirteen.

After school in Echmiadzin he studied at the Yerevan State Agricultural Institute (now the Armenian National Agrarian University), served in the Soviet Army and became an officer, and began his working life as director of a greenhouse farm. He had helped his father on the family farm from an early age and took casual jobs while studying. In 1996 he completed studies at the department of health protection and environmental safety of the International Academy of Informatization.

In July 2014 Sloyan organized a trip to the ancestral villages of Usub Bek, Jangir Agha and his own family, with Armenian and Yezidi participants including the lawyer Simon Tsaturyan and the professor Sergo Yeritsyan. In Kullug, in the former Surmalu district near the Armenian border, he found his family's house. Kurds and Azerbaijanis now live in the village.

== Business career ==
In 1991 Sloyan moved with his family from Armenia to Moscow, where he started from nothing. He built a business in construction and property development. He is also reported to have made money in the television industry after emigrating to Russia.

He had a shopping mall in Moscow that he named Shingal, after the Yezidi region of northern Iraq. Around 2009–2010 he managed a trade complex on Entuziastov Highway in Moscow, together with his long-time friend and business partner Ashot Takmazyan, an ethnic Armenian.

Late in life Sloyan ran his business alongside several projects for the Yezidi cause: the Yezidi Congress, Lalish TV, the Aknalich temple complex, and plans for a Yezidi temple in Moscow. The Ziarat temple cost about €1 million, and the Armenian parliament member Rustam Bakoyan said after Sloyan's death that he had given millions of dollars to Sinjar genocide relief, built the world's largest Yezidi sanctuary in Armenia and founded the only Yezidi television company.

== Yezidi organizations in Russia ==
=== Yezidi Congress ===
Sloyan began planning an all-Russian Yezidi organization in September 2015 and invited Yuri Dasni, a Yezidi acquaintance in Moscow, to lead it. Dasni declined. The Yezidi Congress (Езидский конгресс) was founded in Moscow on 28 September 2016 as the first all-Russian Yezidi public organization. Its charter commits it to preserving and developing the historical, spiritual and cultural community of Yezidis across Russia and to uniting them in a single congress. Sloyan is credited as its founder. It was the first political platform uniting Yezidis in Russia, with the aim of pressing Russia to recognize the Sinjar attacks as a genocide.

=== Lalish TV ===
Lalish TV, named after the Yezidi holy sanctuary of Lalish and sponsored by Sloyan, began broadcasting from Moscow on 1 April 2016. It broadcasts in Kurmanji and Russian, with cultural, religious, historical and social programming. Its coverage area includes Russia, Europe, Armenia, Georgia and Iraq, and some programs are produced in studios in Germany and France. The channel describes itself as the only Yezidi satellite channel in the world, and its stated aim is to help Yezidis keep their identity.

Sloyan discussed the project in February 2016 as a way to unite Yezidis scattered across the world, and hired a Yezidi specialist from Germany who had worked for a German broadcaster and Euronews to launch it. Lalish TV and the news portal EzidiNews are the Congress's main tools for preserving Yezidi culture and identity. Sloyan also planned a Yezidi temple in Moscow.

== Aknalich temple complex ==
=== Ziarat temple ===
In summer 2010 Sloyan joined a group of Russia-based Yezidi businessmen on a trip to Lalish. On the way back he decided to build a Yezidi temple in Armenia rather than Russia, expecting difficulty in obtaining land and building permits in Russia. Mir Tahsin Beg, the prince of the Yezidis, at first refused to bless the project because no Yezidi temple had been built outside the community's homeland, and agreed after repeated negotiations with the Yezidi leadership at Lalish. A delegation from Lalish then blessed the site and laid the foundation stone, and construction took eight months.

Mir Tahsin Beg consecrated the temple, called Ziarat, at Aknalich on 29 September 2012. It was the first Yezidi temple in the post-Soviet world. It was built with Sloyan's personal funds, and an organizing committee of Sloyan, Yuri Dasni, Amo Sharoyan, Baris Lazgyan, Muraz Mstoyan and Isko Dasni arranged the ceremony. At the opening Mir Tahsin Beg said Yezidi shrines must be built according to Yezidi canons and with the blessing of the Supreme Spiritual Council at Lalish.

=== Armenian–Yezidi friendship memorial ===
Work on a cultural center of more than 1,000 square metres began in 2012. Its plans included a museum, library, school, children's clubs and a press-conference hall, and its main hall seats 1,200. Sergo Yeritsyan helped Sloyan design and build the complex.

On 29 September 2014, the second anniversary of the Ziarat opening, several monuments were unveiled at the site before thousands of visitors from Iraq, Syria, Georgia, Germany and Russia. The central monument shows an Armenian cross edged by the Yezidi sun, an image of Tawûsî Melek, and capitals of Zvartnots Cathedral. The others honor Usub Bek, Andranik and Jangir Agha, and the centenary of the Armenian genocide, which also commemorates the Yezidi, Pontic Greek and Assyrian genocides. Senior Armenian officials attended the opening of the alley, and Jangir Agha's remains were reburied there. Catholicos Karekin II and senior clergy of the Armenian Apostolic Church attended the dedication of the Armenian–Yezidi brotherhood monuments. The complex now has seven monuments, one of them devoted to Armenian–Yezidi friendship. By 2019 the statue park facing the temple also included a statue of Nadia Murad and a statue of Andranik on horseback, and a statue on the grounds honors the victims of the 2014 Yezidi genocide.

=== Quba Mêrê Dîwanê ===
In April 2015, during commemorations of the centenary of the Armenian genocide, the Religious Council of the Yezidis approved and blessed a second, larger temple at Aknalich that was also to serve as a cultural center. The architect Artak Ghulyan was commissioned, Yezidi representatives rejected his first design, and a new one was prepared. The foundation stone was laid in April 2015 with the blessing of Mir Tahsin Beg and Baba Sheikh.

The 2014 Sinjar attacks influenced the decision to build the larger temple, which was meant to give Armenia's Yezidis more visibility and support at a time when they were often described as Kurds or Zoroastrians. The Armenian government waived taxes on imported materials, including marble from Iran and relics from Iraq. The Guardian reported in 2016 that Sloyan was funding the project, which was to have a prayer hall of 200 square metres, a conference hall, a seminary and a museum. In March 2019 Sloyan spent a month in Yerevan and went to Aknalich daily to watch the building rise.

The temple, designed by Artak Ghulyan, is 25 metres high and faced with white Iranian marble and polished granite. Its design was heavily inspired by Lalish. It has seven domes, each topped with a sun symbol, for the seven angels of Yezidi belief, and the central dome stands for Melek Taus. It contains a prayer hall, a religious school and a museum, and adjoins the older temple and a Yezidi cemetery.

Quba Mêrê Dîwanê was opened on 29 September 2019, seven years to the day after the Ziarat temple was consecrated, in a ceremony attended by high-ranking Armenian officials. A delegation of clergy from Lalish performed the consecration. The temple was built with funding from Sloyan. Sloyan looked gravely ill at the ceremony. In his speech he greeted Yezidis around the world and the Armenian people, said relations between Yezidis and Armenians had grown from friendship to brotherhood, and thanked the Armenian government. He asked forgiveness from anyone he might have offended and said he had built the shrine for his people and was giving it to them. Nadia's Initiative, the organization of Nobel laureate Nadia Murad, welcomed the temple.

== Aid after the 2014 Sinjar attack ==
After Islamic State forces seized the Sinjar region in August 2014, Sloyan gave a large sum and started a fundraising drive for Yezidi victims. The money paid for camps where refugees received essentials. A few days after the attack he visited refugee camps in Iraqi Kurdistan and spoke with displaced Yezidis from Sinjar. He was in Sinjar in early August 2014 and, with the Yezidi spiritual leader and senior clergy from Lalish, looked for ways to help and organized the removal of people to safe areas. He was elected to a commission on the security of Yezidis in northern Iraq and continued to organize financial and material aid for refugees and for Yezidis who remained in Iraq. He travelled to Iraqi Kurdistan immediately after the attack with the pir Zado Isebia and Telman Feroyan and came back deeply affected.

In 2014 three families from Sinjar, twenty people in all, settled in Armenia, where Sloyan paid for their housing, found them work and gave them a monthly allowance. Bakoyan said he gave millions of dollars to Sinjar genocide relief.

== Views and reception ==
According to Yuri Dasni, Sloyan was strongly devoted to the Yezidi religion. He was sometimes accused of anti-Kurdish views. Dasni rejected this, saying Sloyan did not speak ill of Kurds and counted Kniaz Hasanov, a Muslim Kurd who chaired the council of the Kurdish community of Armenia, among his closest friends. In Dasni's account Sloyan described Yezidis and Kurds as brothers divided by Islam, and he was bitter that Peshmerga forces left the Yezidis undefended in 2014. Bakoyan called him one of the cornerstones of Armenian–Yezidi friendship.

== Death and commemoration ==
Sloyan had a heart condition that interrupted his work for treatment, and he left for Germany for medical care in early October 2019. He died in a Munich hospital on 3 November 2019 after complicated surgery.

He is buried within the temple complex at Aknalich. In August 2020 Bakoyan and Armavir governor Hambardzum Matevosyan laid flowers at the monument to the Sinjar victims at Aknalich, and the governor visited his grave. Each year at the end of September thousands of Yezidis from Armenia, Europe, Russia and elsewhere attend the anniversary of the temple's opening, and an arts program is held in his memory that day.

== Personal life ==
Sloyan married in 1971 and had three children. His nephew Mraz Sloyan manages the temple property at Aknalich, and his grandson Ronnie Savlan is a member of the Yezidi Congress.

== See also ==
- Yazidis in Armenia
- List of Yazidi holy places
