= Mar Oraha Monastery =

Chaldean Catholic Monastery in Iraq

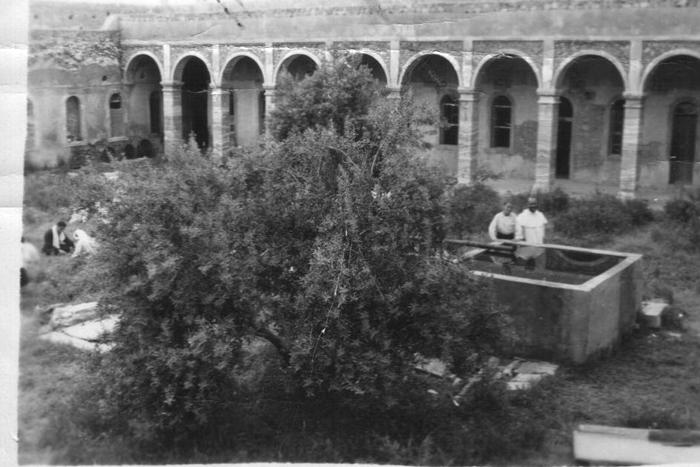
- The monastery during the 1960s

Religion
- Affiliation: Chaldean Catholic

Location
- Location: Batnaya, Nineveh, Iraq
- Interactive map of Mar Oraha Monastery
- Coordinates: 36.5454°N 43.1460°E

Architecture
- Completed: 6th century

Dayra d'Mar Oraha (Syriac: ܕܲܝܪܵܐ ܕܡܵܪܝ ܐܲܒ݂ܪܵܗܵܡ) (Saint Abraham Monastery) is a Chaldean Catholic monastery in northern Iraq close to the town of Batnaya.

The monastery is traditionally attributed to Mar Oraha, who was forced to abandon his hermitage in Mount Alfaf due to a draught, and descended to the Nineveh Plains, where he built his monastery during Ishoʿyahb I's patriarchy (581–596). It was occupied by monks of the Church of the East until 1719, when it passed to the Chaldean Catholic Church. The monastery was completely destroyed and its monks were killed at the hands of Nader Shah of Persia during his campaign in the region in 1743. In 1921, it was rebuilt with the help of the Dominican Order.

The feast of Mar Oraha is held twice at the monastery: the first Sunday of the Great Lent, and the second Sunday after Easter.
