= Zayn ad-Din Yusuf ibn Sharaf ad-Din =

Kurdish Muslim judge and Sufi ascetic

Sheikh Zayn ad-Din Yusuf ibn Sharaf ad-Din
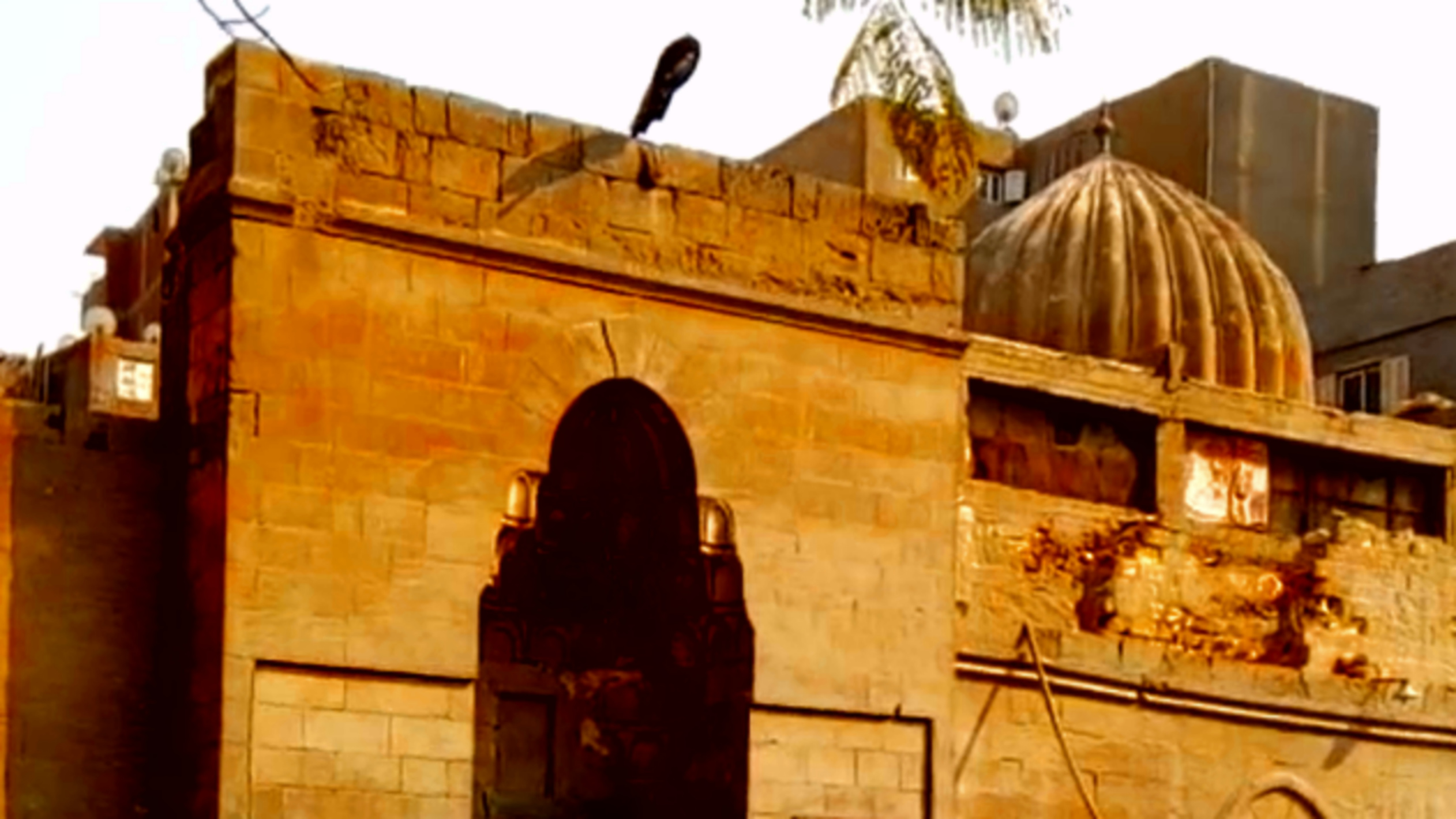
- The zawiya and mausoleum of Zayn ad-Din Yusuf in the southern part of the Qarafa necropolis.
- Died: c. 1324; Cairo, Egypt
- Resting place: His zawiya in the Qarafa necropolis
- Other name: Zeyneddîn (also spelled Zeynedîn)
- Era: Mamluk period
- Predecessor: Sharaf ad-Dīn ibn al-Hasan
- Successor: Fakhr ad-Dīn ibn ‘Adī
- Father: Sharaf ad-Dīn ibn al-Hasan (Şerfedîn)

Sheikh Zayn ad-Din Yusuf ibn Sharaf ad-Din (Kurdish: زەینەددین یووسف کوڕی شەڕەفەددین, romanized: Zeyneddîn Yûsif Kurê Şerefeddîn) also called Zeyneddîn or Zeynedîn was a 14th-century Sunni Muslim scholar, qadi (Islamic judge) and former head of the 'Adawiyya order of Sufism.

== Historical biography ==
The lineage of Zayn ad-Din, according to an inscription in his zawiya (Sufi lodge), can be traced back to the Banu Umayya tribe. The inscription states his full lineage as Zayn ad-Din, son of Sharaf ad-Din, son of al-Hasan, son of 'Adi, son of Sakhr, son of 'Adi, son of Musafir, son of Ismail, son of Musa, son of al-Hasan, son of Marwan, son of al-Hakam, son of Umayya. This connects his lineage to not only to the head of the 'Adawi order, Sheikh Adi, but also connects it to the Umayyad Caliphate and subsequently to Umayya, progenitor of the Banu Umayya tribe.

After his father, Sharaf ad-Din ibn al-Hasan was killed in 1258 by the invading Mongols, Zayn ad-Din succeeded him in being the head of the 'Adawiyya Sufi order but later abdicated for his own safety due to the increasing Mongol aggression. He appointed an elder, Fakhr ad-Din ibn 'Adi, as the new head of the order, due to the fact that Fakhr ad-Din had a Mongol wife and hence could minimize Mongol aggression against the order. Afterwards, Zayn ad-Din left his homeland for Mamluk Egypt to seek knowledge and devote himself to worship.

He was employed as a qadi during the reign of the Mamluk ruler Qalawun. Zayn ad-Din lived a generally ascetic and simple lifestyle of continuous worship, and died in 1324 or 1325 in his zawiya at Cairo.

== Mausoleum ==
The mausoleum of Zayn ad-Din, formerly his zawiya, is located in the historic Qarafa necropolis of Cairo. The mausoleum is constructed with the style of Mamluk architecture and was built around 1297 or 1298 by the followers of the 'Adawiyya order who fled the Mongols and remained in Egypt. Some attribute the mausoleum to be that of a similarly-named Zayn ad-Din Yusuf Abu al-Mahasin who organized a failed revolt against the Mamluk ruler Al-Nasir Muhammad.

== See also ==
- List of Yazidi holy figures
- List of Yazidi holy places
