= Yezidism in Russia =

Yazidism in Russia
Total population
- 40,586 (2010, census)

Languages
- Kurmanji, Russian

Yazidism in Russia refers to believers of Yazidism in Russia. This community is part of the Yazidis who emigrated to Russia from the Armenian and Georgian parts of the Soviet Union after the collapse of the Soviet Union in the 1990s. In 2009, the Yazidis were recognized as a religious community in Russia.

== History ==
=== Imperial Russian expansion and initial contacts (19th century) ===
The history of Yazidi presence in Russian-administered territories began during the early 19th century as the Russian Empire expanded into Transcaucasia. The primary area of contact and migration was the war-torn Ottoman–Russian borderland, known to Yazidis as Sarhad (from Kurmanji Serhed, meaning "borderland"). This zone encompassed territories stretching between Batumi, Mardin, Diyarbakır, and Yerevan, including centers such as Kars, Erzurum, Ağrı, Bayazit, Bitlis, and Van.

Following Russia's annexation of Georgian polities (such as the Kingdom of Kartli-Kakheti in 1801 and Imereti in 1804–1810), Tiflis became the seat of the Viceroy of the Caucasus and the military center for Imperial policy in the region. Imperial victories in the Russo-Persian Wars (1804–1813, 1826–1828) and Russo-Turkish Wars (1828–1829, 1853–1856, 1877–1878) brought various Yazidi and Kurdish tribes under Russian control.

=== Military alliances and early migrations ===
Facing religious persecution in the Ottoman Empire, Yazidis frequently aligned with Imperial Russian military forces.

In the 1828–1829 Russo-Turkish War, Yazidi horsemen served alongside Russian military detachments. In September 1828, Lieutenant General Ivan Paskevich praised a 100-man Yazidi cavalry unit as "exceptionally zealous and gallant". Around the same time, Yazidi chieftain Hassan Agha led 300 families to Bayazit to petition for resettlement within Russian borders.

Following the Treaty of Adrianople (1829), many Yazidi families moved alongside retreating Russian troops from Anatolia into the newly established Armenian Province (Armyanskaya Oblast).

During the Crimean War (1853–1856), Major General M. Likhutin noted that Yazidis voluntarily supplied military intelligence regarding Ottoman army movements without asking for bribes. By 1855, Count Mikhail Loris-Melikov formulated administrative rules for borderland tribes, counting two major Yazidi groups (~740 hearths, or roughly 6,000 individuals) living in the Surmali Uyezd and Bash-Aparan regions.

=== Late 19th-century migrations and Ottoman persecutions ===
Migration accelerated in the second half of the 19th century due to Ottoman policies.

The enforcement of mandatory military service (1847, 1872–1873) and state initiatives like the Advice and Persuasion Commission (1891) and the Reform Division (1892) sought to force Yazidis to adopt Sunni Islam. Because Ottoman official records classified Yazidis as "apostates" (mürted) or counted them as Muslims, refusing conversion often resulted in violent clashes, land confiscations, and executions. Abdul Hamid II created the Hamidiye cavalry, composed of Sunni Kurdish irregulars, in 1891. The resulting persecution and localized massacres (such as in Bitlis in 1895) led thousands of Yazidis to flee into the Russian-administered Kars Oblast, Erivan Governorate, and Georgia.

=== Imperial literature and census classification ===
Russian military officers, academics, and journalists published early accounts of the Yazidis, forming lasting impressions in Russian public discourse.

Alexander Pushkin documented his 1829 meeting with Yazidi chieftain Hassan Agha in A Journey to Arzrum. Writers in periodicals like the Kavkaz newspaper and The Caucasian Calendar (such as Khachatur Abovian) introduced theories linking Yazidi religious traditions to early Christianity and the Armenian Church. Imperial censuses frequently struggled to categorize the Yazidi population. In 1829–1830, Ministry of Interior official Ivan Chopin recorded 67 Yezidi families (324 people) in the Armenian Province. By the 1880s, The Caucasian Calendar recorded between 10,000 and 13,000 Yazidis across Transcaucasia. However, the 1897 Imperial Census based its metrics purely on native language, grouping all 99,836 Kurdish speakers in the Caucasus into a single category regardless of religion.

In 1891, Armenian jurist Solomon Yegiazarov published A Short Ethnographic and Legal Sketch about the Yazidis of the Erivan Governorate, providing one of the first academic studies of Yazidis customary law, prayers, and social structure in the Russian language.

== Demographics ==
Most Yazidis inhabit large cities such as Saint Petersburg, Moscow or Nizhny Nowgorod among others. According to the 2010 Russian census, the total number of Yazidis in the country was 40,586.

== Media ==
The satellite channel of Lalish TV broadcasts in Kurdish from Moscow and is bankrolled by the Yazidi businessman Mirza Sloyan. Launched in April 2016, the channel is located in the Shengal shopping mall, which takes its name from the Yazidi town of Shingal in Iraq.

== Notable persons ==
- Mikhail Aloyan, boxer
- Zarifa Pashaevna Mgoyan, singer
- Zakhariy Kalashov, mafia boss

== See also ==
- Yazidis in Armenia
- Yazidis in Georgia
