= Tel Keppe District =

Tel Kaif Classical Syriac: ܬܠ ܟܐܦܐ, Arabic: تل كيف
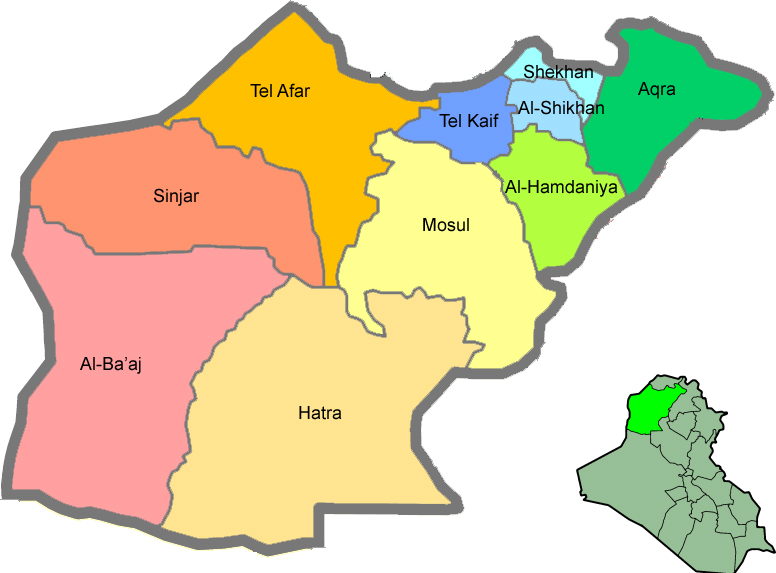
- Tel Keppe District (blue) in Ninawa

- Location within Iraq
- Country: Iraq
- Governorate: Nineveh
- Seat: Tel Keppe

Area
  - Total: 1,244 km^{2} (480 sq mi)

Population (2003)
  - Total: 167,647
- Time zone: UTC+3 (AST)

Tel Keppe District (also Tel Keif, Tall Kayf, Tel Kayf or Tel Kef (Classical Syriac: ܬܠ ܟܐܦܐ), (Arabic: تل كيف)), Aramaic for "Hill of Stones", is a district in Nineveh Governorate, Iraq. Its population is majority Arab Muslim with a large minority of Assyrians.

Towns and villages include:

- Tel Keppe
- Alqosh
- Khatarah
- Tesqopa
- Batnaya
- Sharafiya
- Baqofah
- Bozan
- Beban
- Babirah
- Dughata
- Sreshka
- Khoshaba

== See also ==
- Assyrian settlements
- Assyrian homeland
- Proposals for Assyrian autonomy in Iraq
