= Sharaf ad-Din ibn al-Hasan =

Yazidi saint

Sheikh Sharaf ad-Din ibn al-Hasan
- Şerfedîn
- Died: 1258
- Era: Late Abbasid era and Mongol Empire
- Predecessor: Al-Hasan ibn ‘Adī
- Successor: Fakhr ad-Dīn
- Father: Al-Hasan ibn Adi (Sheikh Hesen)
- Family: Sheikh Adi lineage

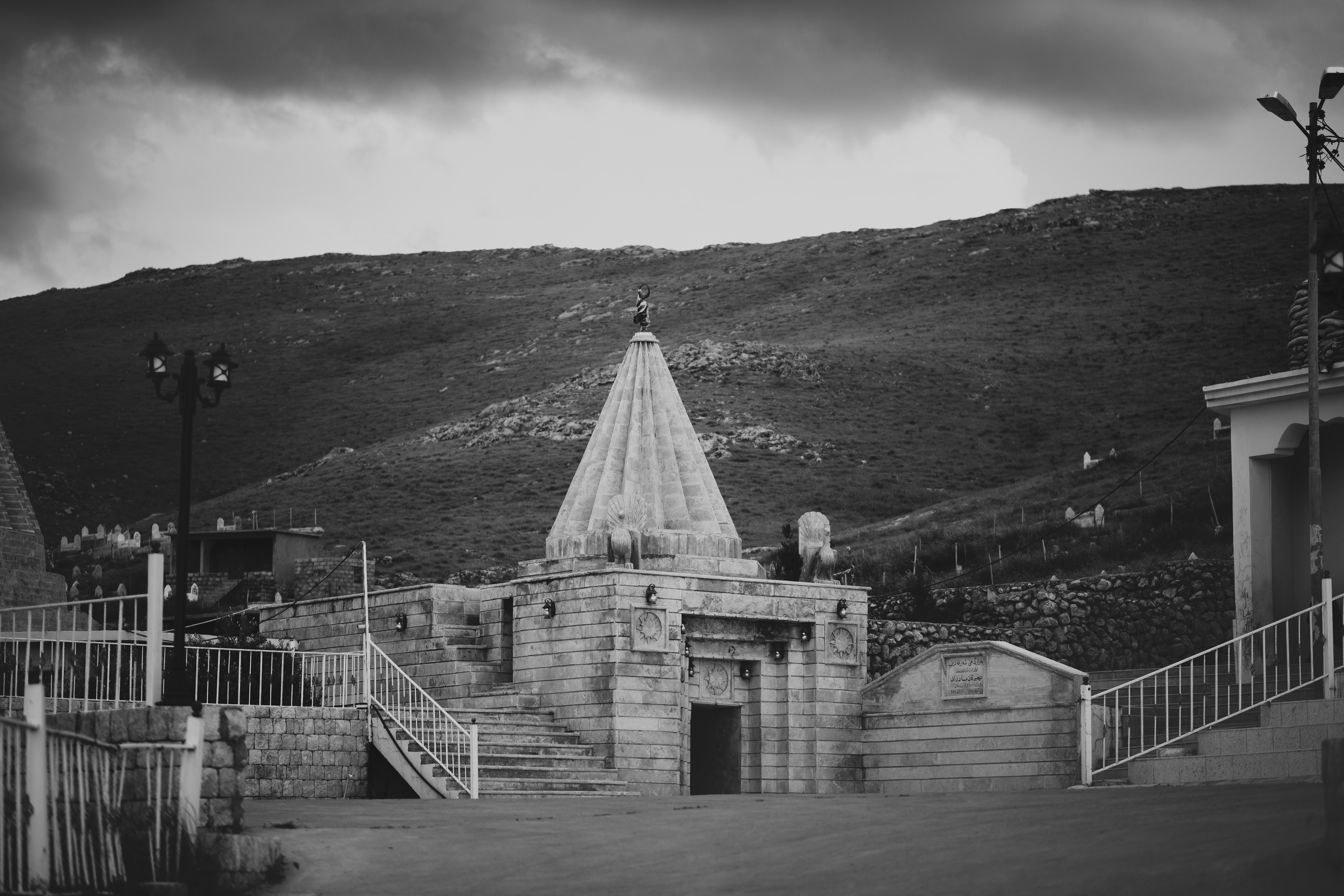
Shrine of Sharaf ad-Din in the Sinjar Mountains near Sinune village

Sheikh Sharaf ad-Din ibn al-Hasan (Kurdish: شه‌رفه‌دین, romanized: Şerfedîn) was the son and religious heir of his father, al-Hasan ibn ‘Adī and thus head of the ‘Adawiyya order. Sharaf ad-Dīn and al-Hasan ibn ʿAdī (Sheikh Hesen) are traditionally credited in Yazidi tradition with major religious reforms, including the institutionalization of endogamy and the finalization of the Yazidi caste system. He died in battle against the invading Mongols in 1258 and was succeeded by his uncle, Fakhr ad-Dīn. Due to the hostility of the Mongols, his son Zayn ad-Dīn preferred not to become his successor and passed on the duties to Fakhr ad-Dīn, who was married to a Mongol.

The Sharfadin Temple is considered to be one of the oldest and most important Yazidi holy sites. Sherfedin is particularly revered in the Sinjar region.

The Yazidi Qewlê Şerfedîn ("Hymn of Şerfedîn") identifies Şerfedîn with the Mahdi. In the hymn (qewl), Şerfedîn is currently staying in a cave and will emerge at the end of times.

== See also ==
- List of Yazidi holy figures
- List of Yazidi holy places

Sharaf ad-Din ibn al-Hasan ‘Adawiyya and Yezidi Notables
Preceded by Al-Hasan ibn ‘Adī	Shaikh of the ‘Adawiyya Ṣūfī Order	Succeeded by Fakhr ad-Dīn ibn ‘Adī
