= Mount Mar Daniel =

Mountain in Iraq

- Mount St. Daniel
- Location within Iraq

Highest point
- Elevation: 500 m (1,600 ft)
- Coordinates: 36°22′23″N 43°27′13″E

Geography
- Location: Bartella, Iraq

Mount Mar Daniel (Syriac: ܛܘܪܐ ܕܡܪܝ ܕܐܢܝܠ) is a mountain in Nineveh Plains in northern Iraq. The mountain lies 30km east of Mosul and some 5km north east of Bartella.

Mount Mar Daniel was known for its religious importance in Syriac Christianity since the 4th century when it was continuously inhabited by hermits. The mountain contains the Mar Daniel monastery which dates back to the 4th century.

== See also ==
- Mount Alfaf
