= Beban =

Beban Bêban بيبان
- Village
- Location in Iraq
- Coordinates: 36°41′55″N 43°9′7″E
- Country: Iraq
- Region: Kurdistan Region (de facto)
- Governorate: Nineveh Governorate (de jure); Dohuk Governorate (de facto)
- District: Tel Kaif District

Beban (Arabic: بيبان, Kurdish: بێبان, romanized: Bêban) is a village located in the Tel Kaif District of the Ninawa Governorate in northern Iraq. The village is located 8 kilometres (5.0 mi) southeast of Alqosh in the Nineveh Plains. It belongs to the disputed territories of Northern Iraq. Beban has exclusively Yazidi population.

== Etymology ==
The name Beban is derived from the Assyrian "Beth-Bane".
