= Raad =

Raad or Ra'ad may refer to:

== Military ==
- Raad (air defense system), Iranian air defense system
- Ra'ad (air-launched cruise missile), or Hatf-VIII, Pakistani weapon
  - Ra'ad-II
- Ra'ad (anti-ship missile), Iranian weapon
- RAAD (anti-tank guided missile), family of Iranian weapons, including RAAD, RAAD-T, I-RAAD and I-RAAD-T
- Raad-1 and Raad-2, Iranian self-propelled howitzers
- RAAD 200, Egyptian multiple rocket launcher

== Other uses ==
- Raad (name), including a list of people with the name
- Republican Action Against Drugs, former Irish republican vigilante group

== See also ==
- Raad ny Foillan, coastal long-distance footpath in the Isle of Man
