= Batnaya =

- Village
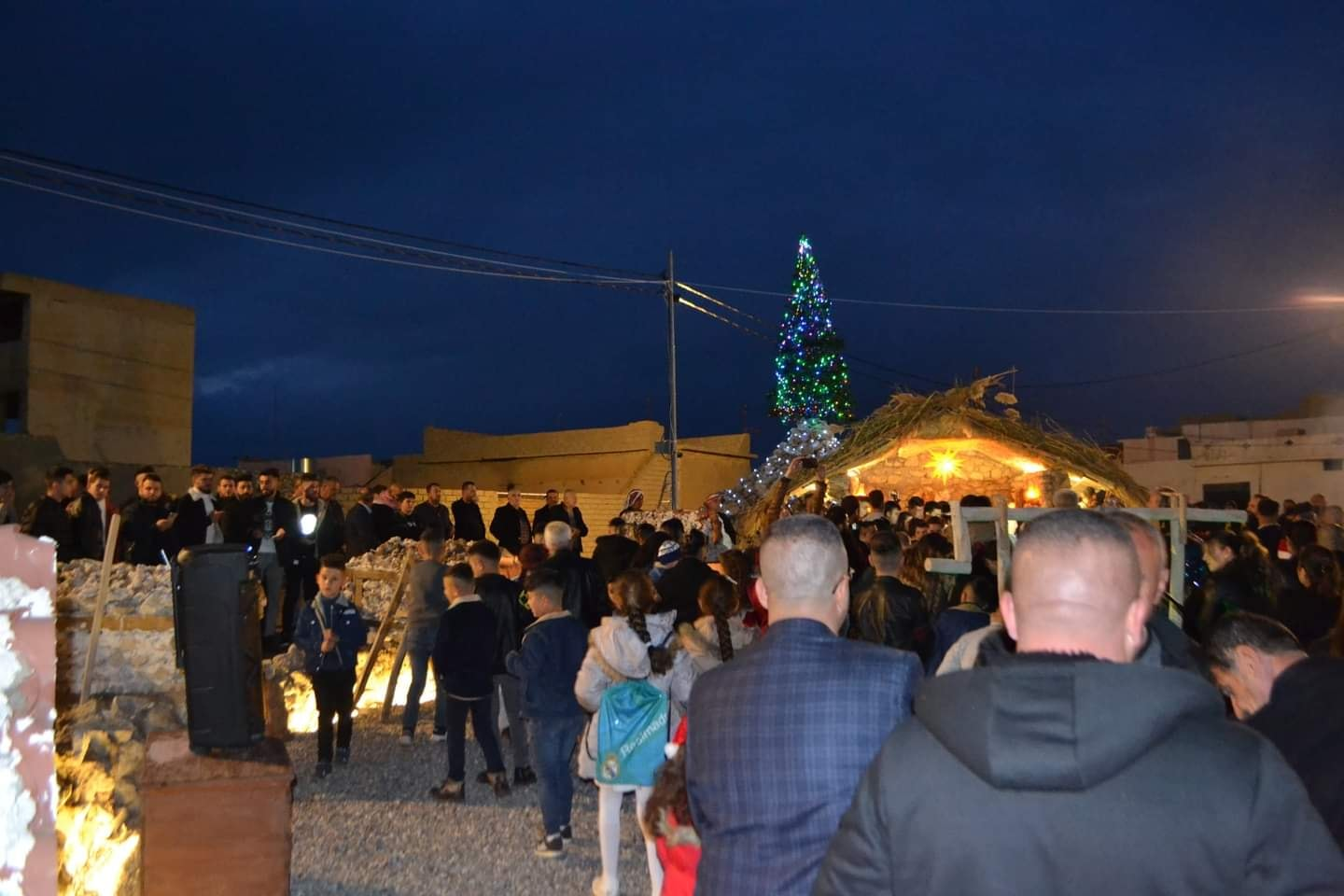
- Christmas at Batnaya

- Location in Iraq
- Coordinates: 36°32′15″N 43°7′24″E
- Country: Iraq
- Governorate: Nineveh Governorate
- District: Tel Kaif District

Batnaya (Arabic: باطنايا, Syriac: ܒܛܢܝܐ) is a village in Nineveh Governorate, Iraq. It is located in the Tel Kaif District in the Nineveh Plains.

In the village, there are Chaldean Catholic churches of Mar Quriaqos and Mart Maryam. The Mar Oraha Monastery is also located near the village.

== Etymology ==
Several theories have been put forward for the origin of the name of the village as local traditions suggest it may derive from "beth" ("place" in Syriac) and "ṭeṭnāyé" ("clouded corneas" in Syriac), thus translating to "the place of those who have clouded corneas", which is believed to allude to eye diseases caused by plaiting reeds, or could be a combination of "beth" and "ṭnānā" ("zeal" in Syriac) and translate to "place of zeal". The village's original name, Beṯ Maḏāye, is argued by the French Syriacist Jean Maurice Fiey to derive from "beth" and "Madaye" ("Medes" in Syriac) and thus translates to "place of the Medes".

== History ==
Batnaya is first attested with the name Beṯ Maḏāye in the History of Beṯ Qōqā in the seventh century AD, at which time the village is believed to have been converted to Christianity by Mar Oraha (Saint Abraham the Mede). Jean Maurice Fiey argues that the name Beṯ Maḏāye suggests that the village was inhabited by Yazidis prior to their conversion. Batnaya is also identified as the Beṯ Maḏāye mentioned in a letter of Catholicos Ishoyahb II (r. 628–645). The church of Mar Quriaqos, which is believed to have originally been a monastery, is mentioned in 1474, in which year a manuscript was copied there by the priest Īshō, son of Isaac, of Hakkari.

The village was populated by adherents of the Church of the East until a number of people adopted Chaldean Catholicism at some point in the early 18th century before 1729. The village and its church was plundered by the forces of Shahanshah Nader Shah in 1743 amidst the Ottoman–Persian War of 1743–1746 and the church was restored in the following year. By 1767, the village's entire population of 200 families had joined the Chaldean Catholic Church. When visited by the English missionary George Percy Badger in 1852, 60 families resided at Batnaya and William Francis Ainsworth counted 50 houses in the village in 1857. The church of Mart Maryam (Arabic: al-Tahira, "all pure") was constructed in 1866. The population grew to 900 people by 1867 and then to 1000 people in 1891. In 1913, Batnaya was inhabited by 2,500 Chaldean Catholics with three priests. The church of Mar Quriaqos was rebuilt in 1944.

By 1961, the population of Batnaya had reached 3104 people. Batnaya was abandoned on 6 August 2014 as its population fled the Islamic State of Iraq and the Levant (ISIL) offensive in Northern Iraq, prior to which the village was inhabited by around 5000 people. The Peshmerga seized control of Batnaya from ISIL on 20 October 2016 after a battle against over 100 ISIL fighters amidst the battle of Mosul. In the battle, the village was mostly destroyed and 60 ISIL fighters and 8 Peshmerga soldiers were killed. ISIL fighters had inflicted significant damage to the village as the church of Mart Maryam, which had been used as a weapons dump, was blown up whilst the church of Mar Quriaqos was ransacked, and only 1% of the village's 997 houses was still intact.

In cooperation with Canadian, French, and American teams, the Peshmerga subsequently set about clearing the village of mines and bombs planted by ISIL fighters. Batnaya hence came under the control of the Kurdistan Regional Government, which, however, is disputed by the Iraqi government. In November 2018, half of the village's population still resided at a refugee camp at Tesqopa. The village has since undergone reconstruction as the United Nations Development Programme restored 400 houses, and the first 10 families returned to Batnaya in May 2019. Eventually, 300 people had returned by February 2020, and the village's population grew to 720 people by the following year.

== Notable people ==
- Shlemon Warduni (b. 1943), Chaldean Catholic bishop

== Bibliography ==
- Fiey, Jean Maurice (1975). Assyrie Chrétienne (in French). Vol. 2. Imprimerie Catholique de Beyrouth.
- Wilmshurst, David (2000). The Ecclesiastical Organisation of the Church of the East, 1318–1913. Peeters Publishers.

== See also ==
- Assyrian homeland
- Proposals for Assyrian autonomy in Iraq
