= Sreshka =

- Village
- Location in Iraq
- Coordinates: 36°38′6″N 43°8′50″E
- Country: Iraq
- Region: Kurdistan Region (de facto)
- Governorate: Nineveh Governorate (de jure); Dohuk Governorate (de facto)
- District: Tel Kaif District

Sreshka (also written Srechka, Sireshka, Sireshkan or Srejka, Arabic: سريجكا, Kurdish: Sireshkan) is a village located in the Tel Kaif District of the Ninawa Governorate in Iraq. The village is located ca. 13 kilometres (8.1 mi) south of Alqosh and ca. 6 kilometres (3.7 mi) north of Telskuf in the Nineveh Plains. It belongs to the disputed territories of Northern Iraq.

Sreshka is populated by Yazidis.

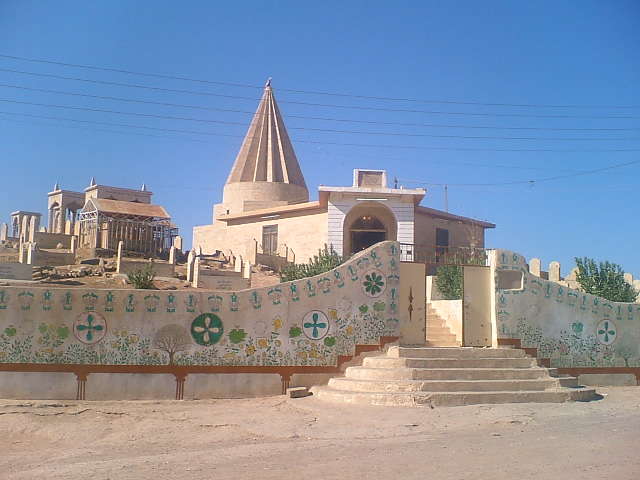
Yazidi temple in Sreshka
