= Mam Rashan Shrine =

Yazidi site on Mount Sinjar in Iraq

Coordinates: 36.668151°N 43.426067°E

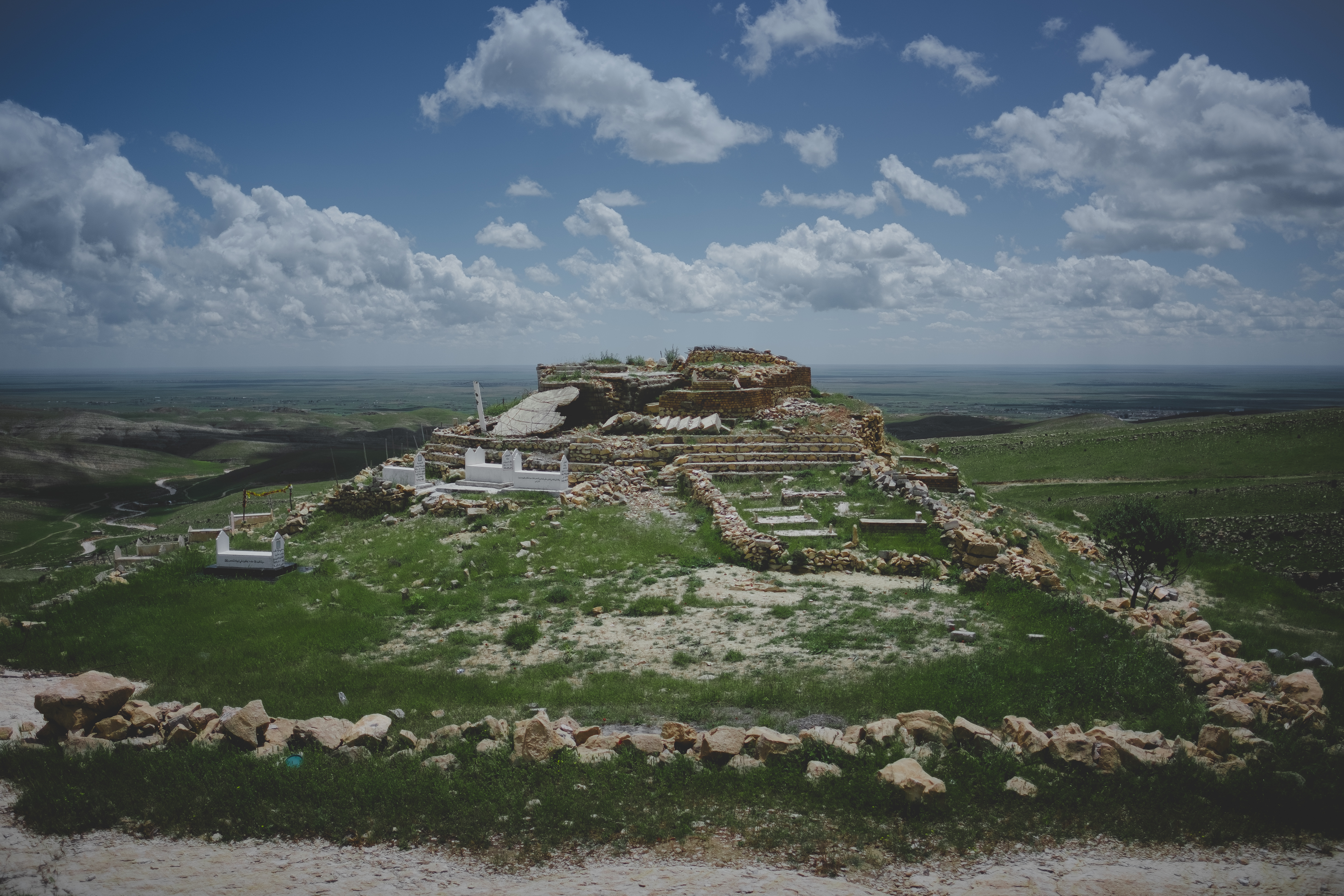
Mam Rashan Shrine, partially destroyed by ISIL.

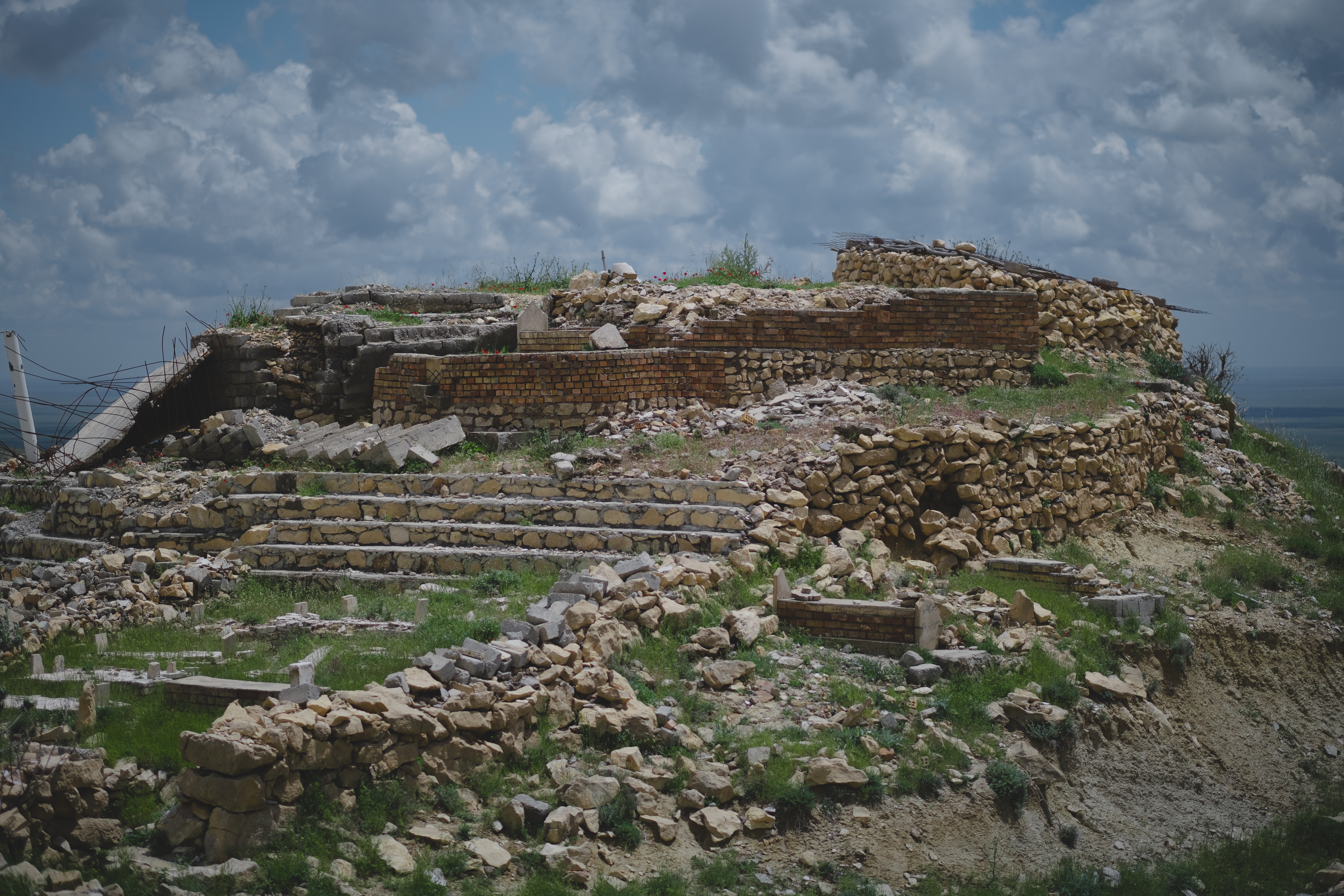
Mam Rashan Shrine after the destruction (close-up).

Mam Rashan Shrine was a Yazidi shrine built in the 12th century located on Mount Sinjar in northwestern Iraq. The shrine is dedicated to Pîr Mehmed Reşan, a Yazidi holy figure associated with agriculture, rain, and the annual harvest.

== Destruction and reconstruction ==
It was destroyed by Islamic State of Iraq and the Levant (ISIL) as part of the Sinjar massacre in 2014.

The site was listed as one of 25 sites of the 2020 World Monuments Watch published by World Monuments Fund (WMF) to recognize the international reconstruction efforts. Reconstruction work was started in the summer of 2020, with the assessment and documentation of the site. In October 2020, the Yazidi religious authorities held a religious ceremony to bless the works.

== See also ==
- List of Yazidi holy places
