= Dughata =

Dughata Doxata دوغات
- Village
- Location in Iraq
- Coordinates: 36°38′33″N 43°6′48″E
- Country: Iraq
- Region: Kurdistan Region (de facto)
- Governorate: Nineveh Governorate (de jure); Dohuk Governorate (de facto)
- District: Tel Kaif District

Dughata (also written Doghata, Dughat, Doghan or Dokhata, Arabic: دوغات; Kurdish: دۆخاتا, romanized: Doxata) is a village located in the Tel Kaif District of the Ninawa Governorate in northern Iraq. The village is located ca. 12 kilometres (7.5 mi) south of Alqosh and ca. 7 kilometres (4.3 mi) north of Telskuf in the Nineveh Plains. It belongs to the disputed territories of Northern Iraq.

Dughata has an exclusively Yazidi population.

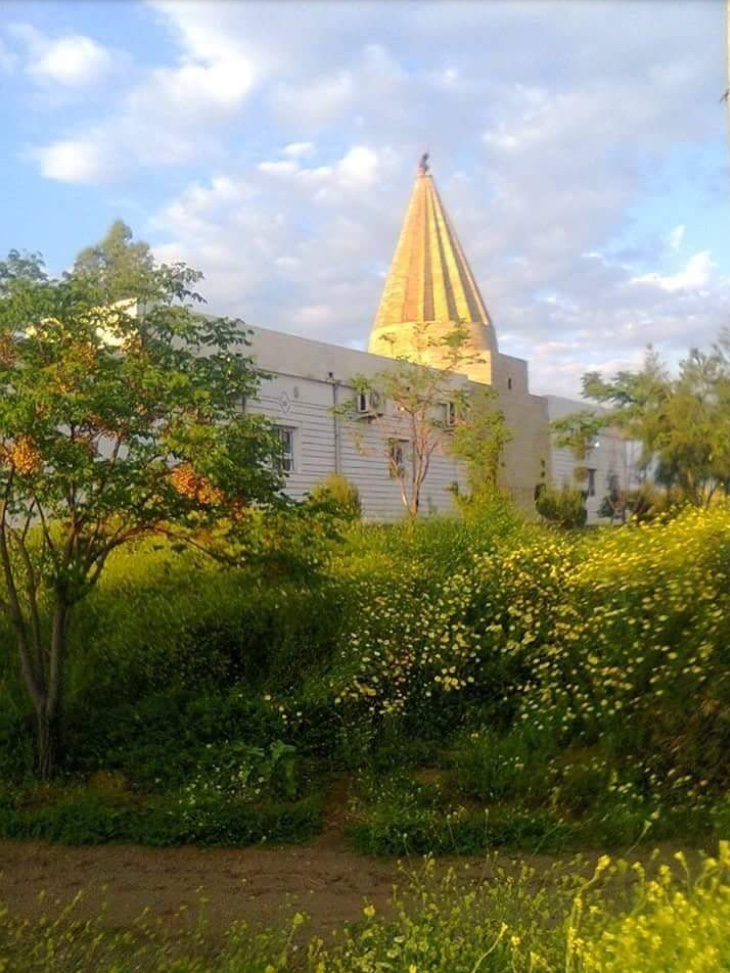
Yazidi temple in Dughata
