= Babirah =

Babirah Babira بابيرة
- Village
- Location in Iraq
- Coordinates: 36°32′37″N 43°1′27″E
- Country: Iraq
- Region: Kurdistan Region (de facto)
- Governorate: Nineveh Governorate (de jure); Dohuk Governorate (de facto)
- District: Tel Kaif District

Babirah (Arabic: بابيرة, Kurdish: بابیرێ, romanized: Babîrê) is a village located in the Tel Kaif District of the Ninawa Governorate in northern Iraq. The village is located ca. 15 kilometres (9.3 mi) southwest of Telskuf in the Nineveh Plains. It belongs to the disputed territories of Northern Iraq.

Babirah is populated by Yazidis.

== History ==
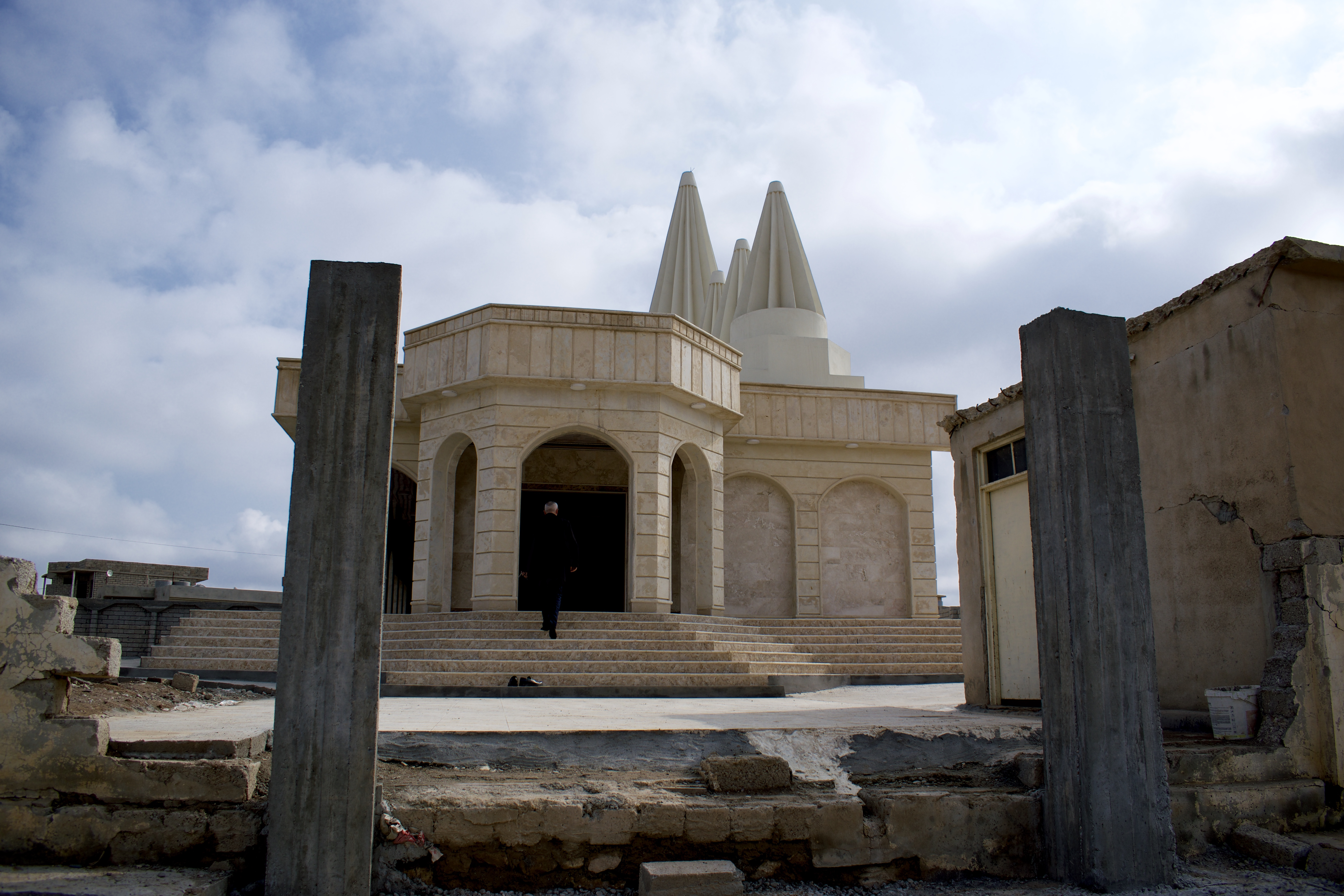
Yazidi temple (Şexsê Batê) in Babirah It was destroyed by ISIS in 2014, but rebuilt when the village was repopulated again by Yazidis

The village was originally an Assyrian village known as Bet Bore before it was settled by Yazidis and was known to contain an Assyrian population up until at least the 13th century.

== Yazidi holy sites ==
In Babira as well as the neighbouring town of Risala, the following Yazidi shrines are found:

1. Melik Şêxsin
2. Balilê Habaş
3. Şexsê Batê
