= Sharfadin Temple =

Temples in Iraq

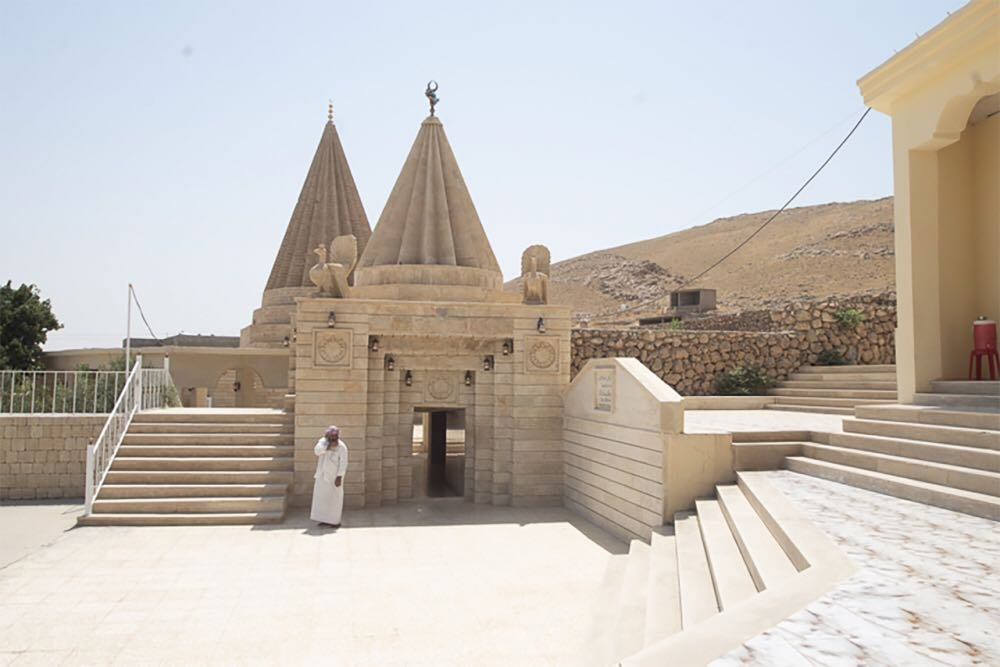
- Sharfadin Temple

Religion
- Affiliation: Sharfadin

Location
- Location: Sinjar, Iraq
- Interactive map of Sharfadin Temple

The Sharfadin Temple (Kurdish: Mezargeha Şerfedîn) in Sinjar, Iraq is a Yazidi temple built in honor of Sheikh Sherfedin. It is considered by Yazidis as one of the holiest places on earth.

The temple is made of a pale yellow stone, with two cones atop the building. At the tip of each cone are three gold balls and a crescent reaching skyward.

In August 2014, the temple was the site of a battle where 18 lightly armed Yazidi Peshmerga fighters who were residing under the command of Qasim Shesho successfully held off a larger and better equipped ISIL force with armored vehicles, mortars, rockets, and other artillery that had attacked the shrine as part of the genocide of Yazidis by ISIL.

== See also ==
- List of Yazidi holy places
