= Merki, Iraq =

Merki
- Town
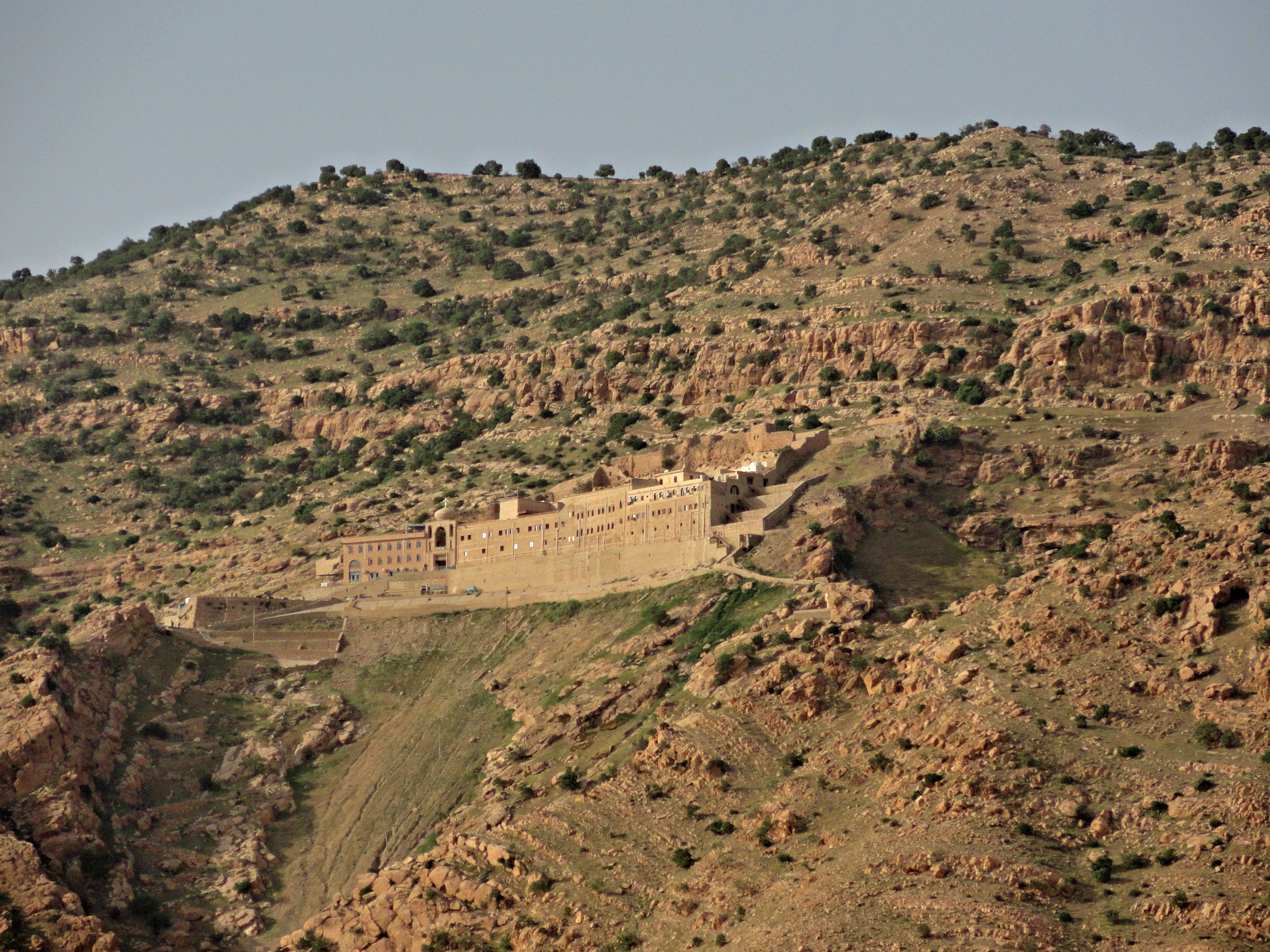
- Mar Mattai Monastery lies above the village in the mountains to the north, and is therefore a feature of the village

- Location within Iraq
- Coordinates: 36°49′N 43°44′E
- Country: Iraq
- Province: Ninawa

Merki is an Assyrian village located in Hamadaniya District of Nineveh Governorate, located below The Mar Mattai Monastery on Mount Alfaf. The village was founded by Syriac Orthodox Christian refugees from Tikrit in 1089, who fled to the Mar Mattai Monastery, establishing this village in the valley below the monastery. The village and Nineveh Plains region were later bolstered by other Syriac refugees from Tikrit due to Mongol raids in 1295 and Timur's genocide of Christians in the early 1400s.

Merki is a prosperous agricultural village, with the cultivation of olives being their specialty. The village has several hundred houses, and a large historic church which was recently restored. In 2015, Christian monks remained at the monastery despite a surge in ISIL activity in the area surrounding the Nineveh Plains.

== See also ==
- List of Assyrian settlements
- Assyrians in Iraq
