= Quba Mêrê Dîwanê =

Yazidi Temple in Armenia

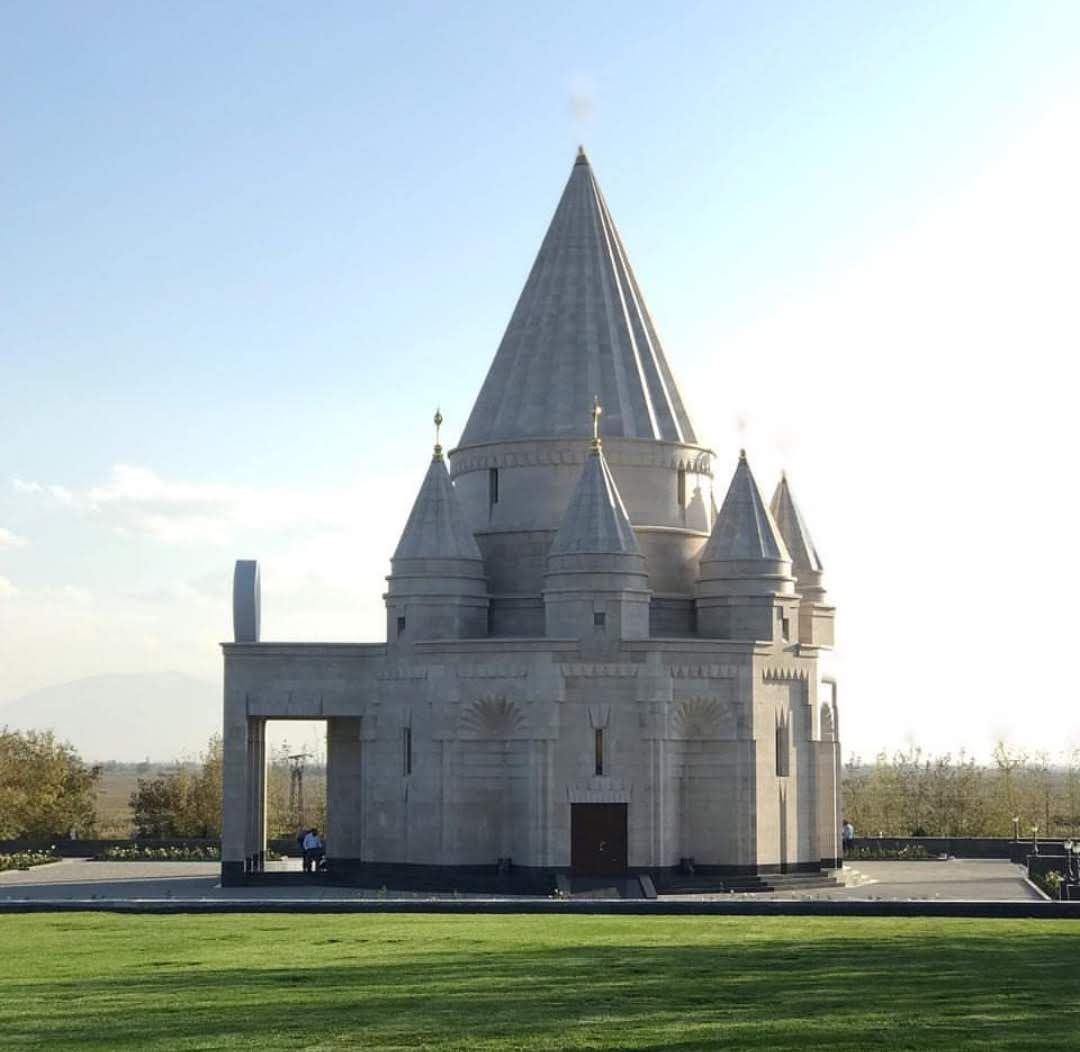
- Quba Mêrê Dîwanê temple

Religion
- Affiliation: Yazidism
- Deity: Melek Taus
- Year consecrated: 2019

Location
- Location: Aknalich, Armavir Province, Armenia
- Interactive map of Quba Mêrê Dîwanê

Architecture
- Funded by: Mirza Sloyan

Quba Mêrê Dîwanê is the world's largest Yazidi temple. It is located in the Armenian village of Aknalich, in the province of Armavir, where the Yezidis are the largest minority. The village of Aknalich is located 35 kilometers west of Yerevan, the capital of Armenia. The village also contains the former Soviet Union's first Yazidi temple, Ziyarat, erected in 2012. The symbolism of Ziyarat and Aknalich's new temple, Quba Mêrê Dîwanê, roughly translated as 'All Will Come Together', has only increased since the Sinjar massacre, noted Khdr Hajoian, vice president of the Yazidi National Union, a Yerevan-based organization.

== Architecture and symbolism ==
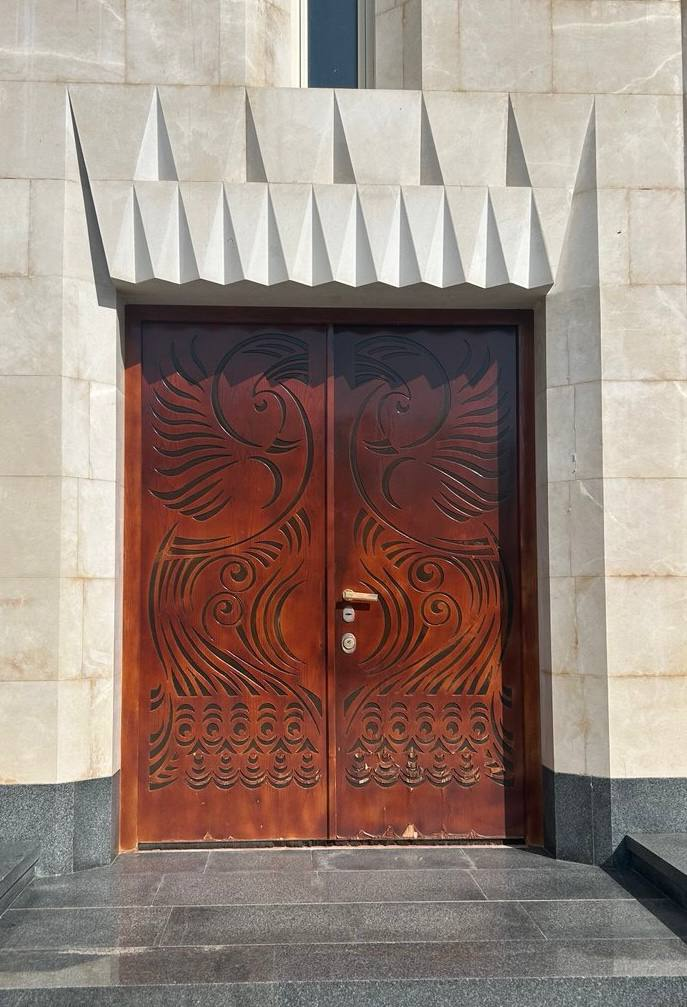
Entrance doors of Quba Mere Diwane

The temple was opened in September 2019 and the opening ceremony was attended by the Deputy Prime Minister of Armenia and other Armenian officials.

It is built of both Armenian granite and Iranian marble. The temple is 25 metres high and consists of seven domes surrounding a central, arched roof, and houses a seminary and museum. The temple is dedicated to the angel Melek Taus and the Seven Angels of Yazidi theology. Malak-Tawus is the most important character of the Yazidi Holy Triad. He dominates all major and minor divinities of the pantheon. Malak-Tawus is, in fact, the essence, the raison d'etre, of the religion of the Yazidis. In a variant of the Yazidi Symbol of Faith he is featured directly after Xwade.

The highest dome and the other seven surrounding ones symbolize the angels and are adorned with golden suns. The design is heavily inspired by Lalish in northern Iraq, the holiest temple of the Yazidis and a site of pilgrimage. Adjacent to the temple is a Yazidi cemetery. In a statue park opposite the temple are a statue of Nobel Prize winner Nadia Murad, a statue honouring Andranik Ozanian, an Armenian military commander who fought the Ottomans in the late 1880s, and an Armenian apostolic cross intertwined with the Yazidi sun, signifying religious harmony. Ethnographer Hranoush Kharatian, the former head of the Armenian government's department for minority affairs, sees the project as part of a broader Yazidi attempt to institutionalize their faith, establishing a spiritual center for the country's Yazidis for the first time.

== Funding ==
Funded by an Armenian Yazidi living in Russia, Mirza Sloyan, Quba Mêrê Dîwanê was built just a few meters away from Ziarat, Armenia's first Yazidi temple established in 2012. The temple is designed by Artak Ghulyan, one of Armenia's most prolific architects of religious buildings. Ghulyan is, in fact, better known for his work on Armenian Apostolic churches. He designed Moscow's new Armenian cathedral and has built over 20 churches for many of Armenia's big names, including a cathedral in Abovyan financed by oligarch and politician Gagik Tsarukian.

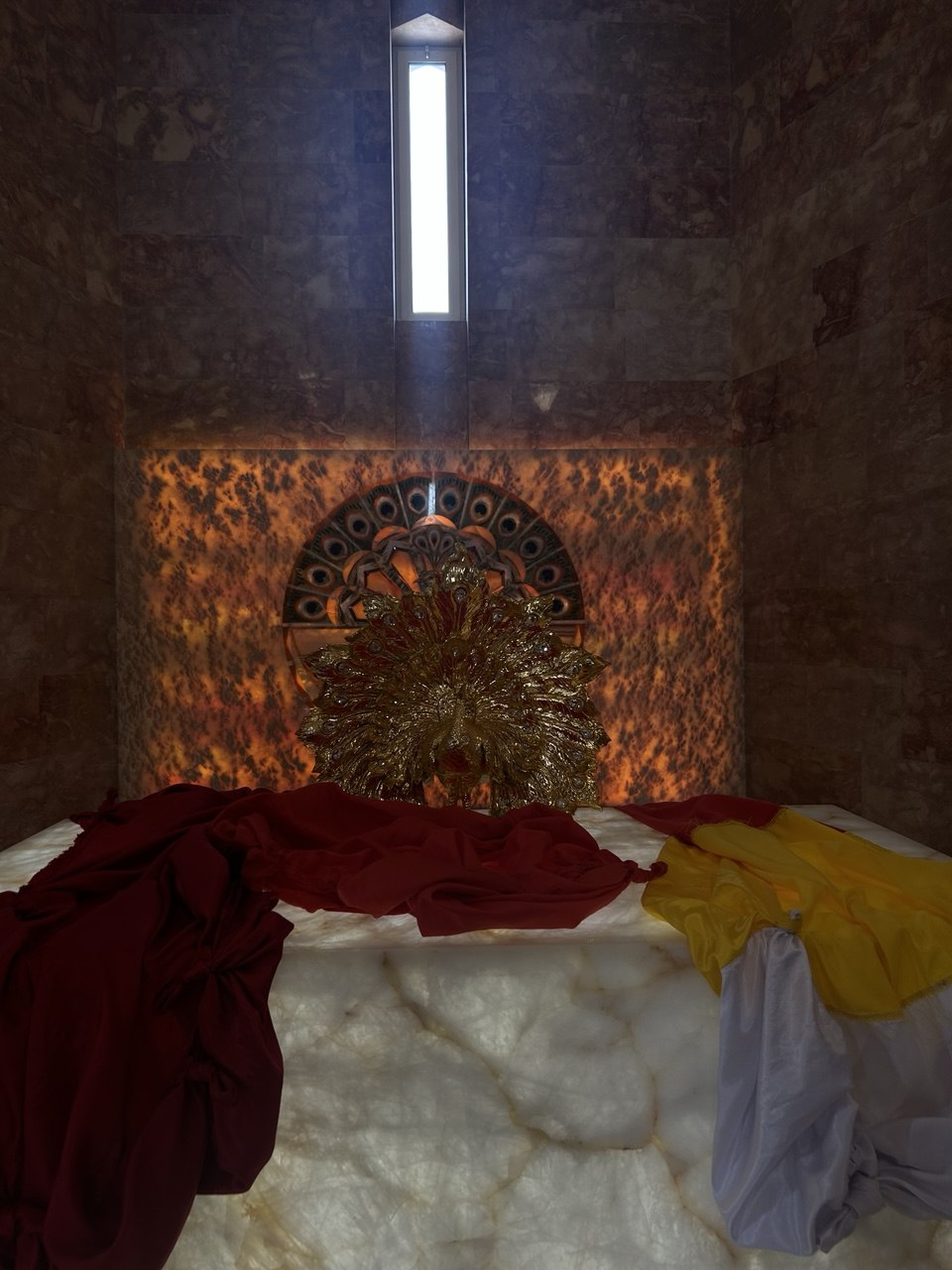
Ceremonial altar featuring a golden peacock statue

== Yazidi traditions and social organizations ==
Yazidis are one of the largest ethnic minorities in Armenia, practicing an ancient, monotheistic belief that has similarities to Christianity, Hinduism, Judaism, Sufism, and Zoroastrianism along with elements of Iranian paganism. According to the Armenian census, 31,079 Yazidis lived in Armenia in 2022, mostly in the western and northern regions of the southern Caucasus.

The temple has a special significance of strengthening the Yazidi identity in Armenia. The temple provides a place for the community to conduct rituals such as weddings and other religious ceremonies led by Sheikhs or Pirs.

The main purpose of a Sheikh is to be a spiritual guide to his followers (mirids). He may compose prayers for them, or impose taboos, and is expected to participate on their behalf in the performance of religious rites such birth, marriage and death. In return, the mirid pays his Sheykh a certain sum of money each year, shows him great respect, and to some extent obeys his authority. The wedding rituals, for example, include regular ceremonies, mutual visits, and observance of customs. When an agreement is made, the future husband's parents, according to the order, go to the future wive's house to ask her parents for her hand in marriage. An oath ceremony takes place when the fathers or close relatives swear by pressing their thumbs together in the presence of a sheikh or pir that they will preserve the unity of the family at all costs.

Every Yazidi must have a Pir as well as a Sheykh, and the system of relationships between families of Pirs and Sheykhs, and between those and other sections of the community, is part of the intricate network of social relationships that is characteristic of Yazidi society. Otherwise, the community is known for their privacy due to several historical and cultural reasons. Historically, they have faced significant persecution, which has led them to adopt a protective stance towards their community and practices.

== See also ==
- Yazidis in Armenia
- List of Yazidi holy places
- Sultan Ezid Temple
- Lalish
