= Khoshaba =

- Village
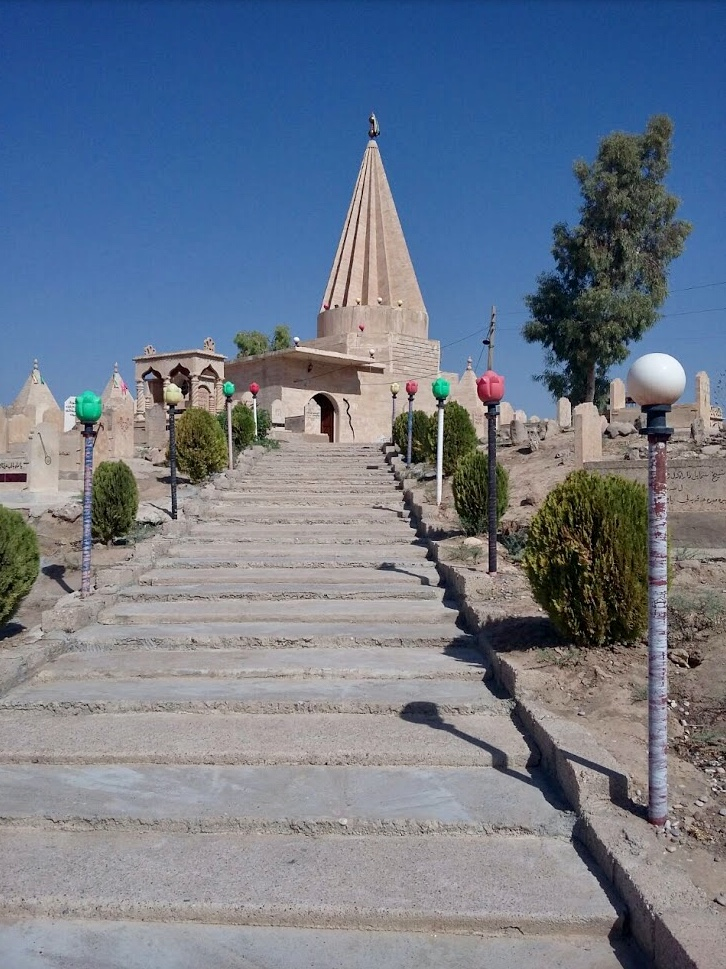
- Yazidi temple in Khoshaba

- Location in Iraq
- Coordinates: 36°37′44″N 43°10′35″E
- Country: Iraq
- Region: Kurdistan Region (de facto)
- Governorate: Nineveh Governorate (de jure); Dohuk Governorate (de facto)
- District: Tel Kaif District

Khoshaba (also written Khawshaba, Arabic: خوشابا; Kurdish: خۆشابا, romanized: Xoşaba) is a village located in the Tel Kaif District of the Ninawa Governorate in Iraq. The village is located ca. 20 kilometres (12 mi) southeast of Alqosh and ca. 9 kilometres (5.6 mi) northeast of Telskuf in the Nineveh Plains. It belongs to the disputed territories of Northern Iraq.

Khoshaba is populated by Yazidis.

== Etymology ==
Khoshaba comes from the Assyrian-Aramaic word ܚܕܒܫܒܐ khoshaba meaning Sunday.

== See also ==
- Yazidis in Iraq
