= Aknalich =

Village in Armavir, Armenia

Aknalich Ակնալիճ
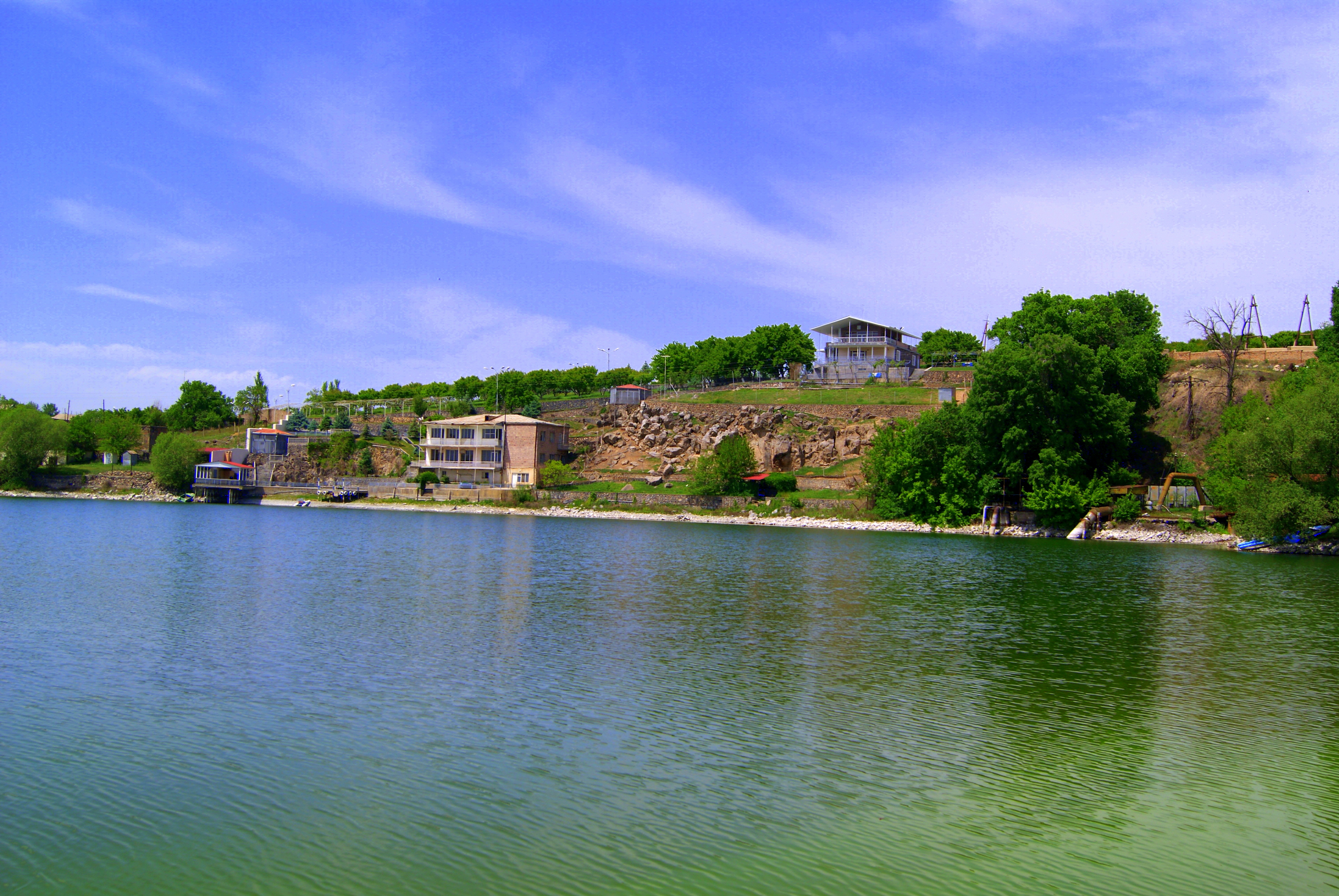
- The Aknalich lake in Aknalich village

- Location within Armenia
- Coordinates: 40°8′26″N 44°9′38″E
- Country: Armenia
- Province: Armavir
- Elevation: 856 m (2,808 ft)

Population (2011)
  - Total: 2,566

Aknalich (or Aknalitch, Armenian: Ակնալիճ; formerly, Aygherlich) is a village in the Armavir Province of Armenia. The village is situated on a lake, after which it is named, to the east of Metsamor.

Aknalich village is the site of the only Yazidi temple in Armenia. A new temple in the village known as Quba Mere Diwane, opened in September 2019. It is the world's largest Yazidi Temple. The 25-meter-tall (82 ft) temple was funded by Armenian-born, Russia-based Yezidi businessman Mirza Sloian.

== Gallery ==
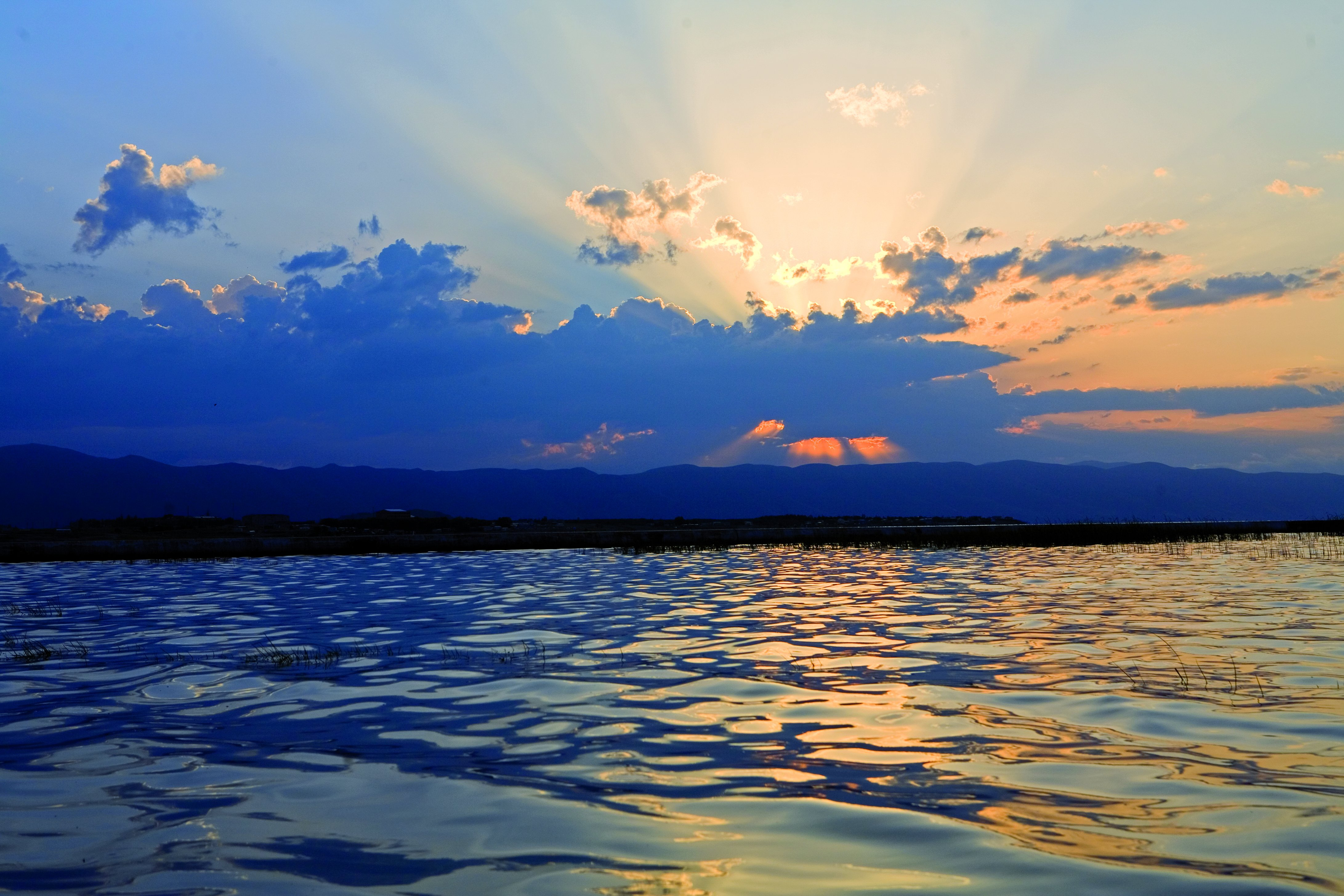
Aknalich lake

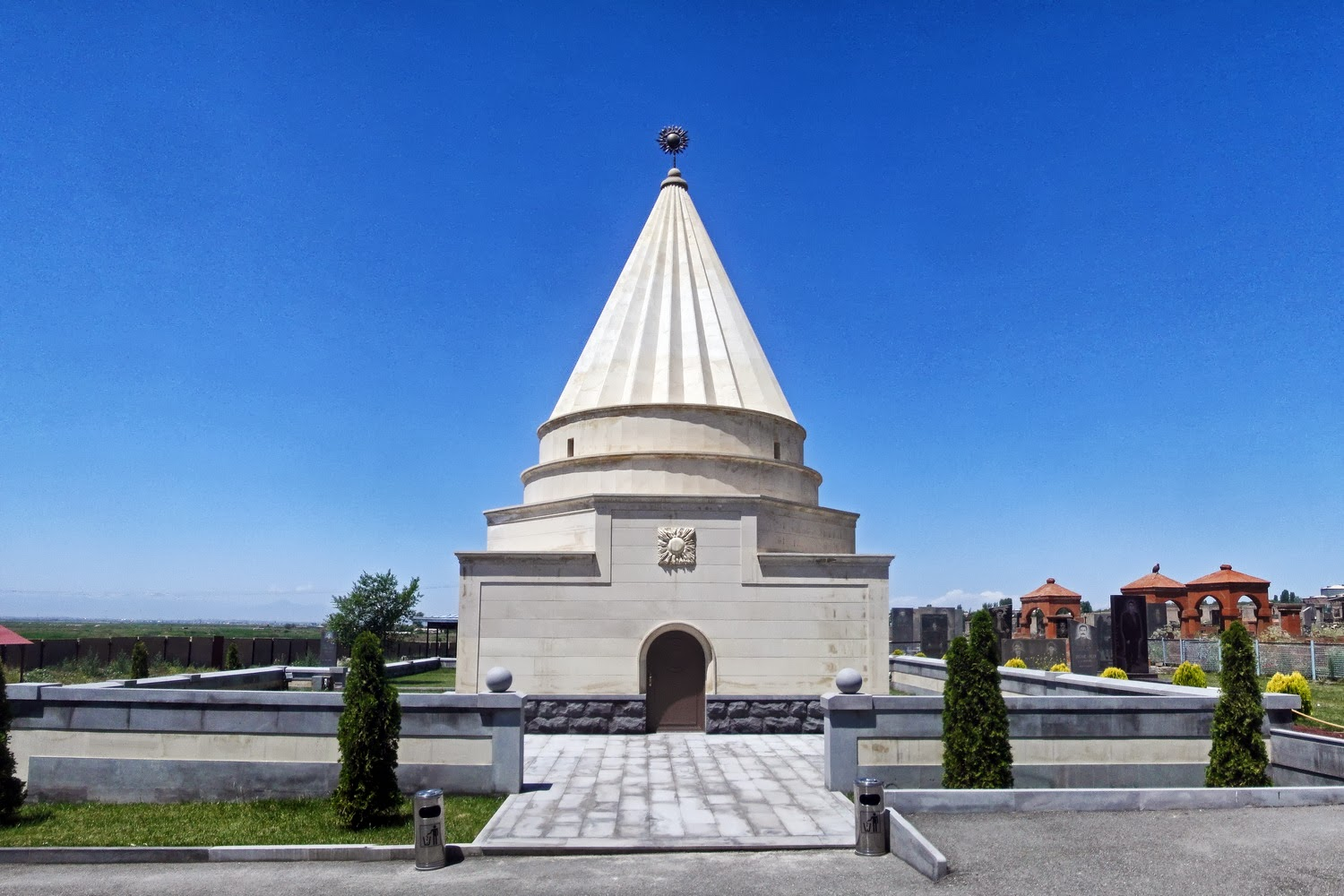
Aknalich Yazidi Temple

== See also ==
- Armavir Province
- Quba Mere Diwane
- List of Yazidi holy places
- Yazidis in Armenia
