= Mount Alfaf =

Mountain in Iraq

- Mount Maqlub, Ṭūrāʾ Alfaf
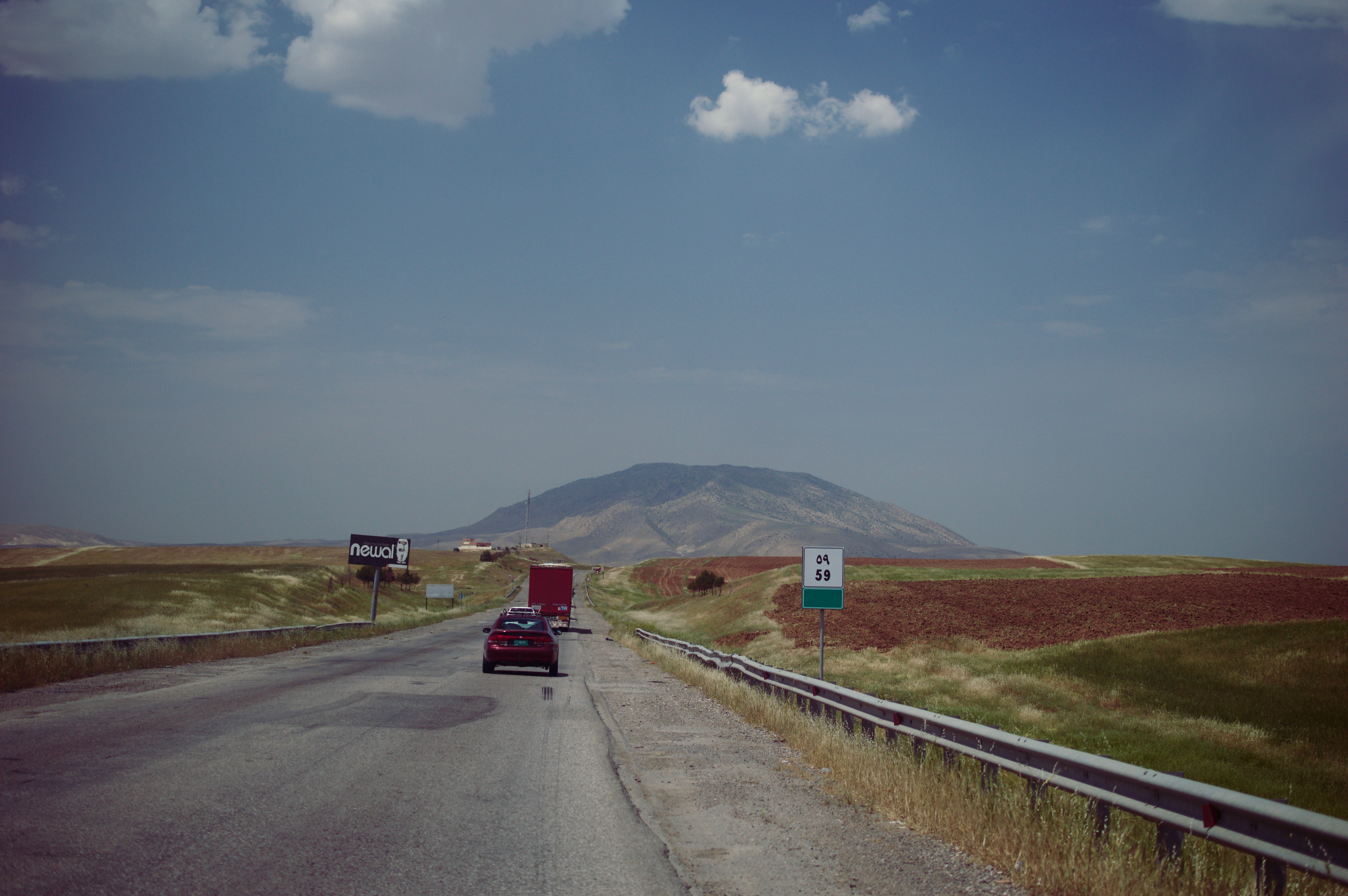
- View of the mountain from the road between Kalek and Bardarash

Highest point
- Elevation: 1,000 m (3,300 ft)
- Coordinates: 36°29′30″N 43°26′29″E

Geography
- Location within Iraq
- Location: Bartella, Iraq

Mount Alfaf (Syriac: ܛܘܪܐ ܕܐܠܦܦ, ṭūrāʾ Alfaf), also known as Mount Maqlub (جبل مقلوب in Arabic), is a mountain in the Nineveh Plains in Kurdistan Region. The mountain lies 30 km to the northeast of Mosul and some 15 km from Bartella. The largest town on the mountain is Merki, which is inhabited by Assyrians of the Syriac Orthodox Church.

The mountain is famous for the Mar Mattai Monastery which lies close to its southern summit. There exist a number of hermitages that date back to the 4th and 5th century AD, the most important of which are:

- Mar Mattai hermitage, where according to Syriac tradition, Sara, sister of Mar Behnam, was miraculously cured of leprosy by Mar Mattai.
- Bar Hebraeus hermitage which was occupied by Bar Hebraeus during his lifetime.
- The spy's hermitage which lies at the top of the mountain and was used as a sentry to warn the occupants of the monastery of bandits.

== See also ==
- Mount Mar Daniel
- Mar Mattai Monastery
