= Raad Mohiaddin =

Raad Hashem Mohiaddin
- Born: c. 1957
- Education: University of London (MSc & PhD)
- Occupation: Physician
- Known for: Cardiovascular imaging

Raad Hashem Mohiaddin (born c. 1957) is professor of cardiovascular imaging at the National Heart and Lung Institute at Imperial College, London, and Royal Brompton Hospital. He is twice winner of the William S. Moore award of the International Society of Magnetic Resonance in Medicine the society's highest honor for medical investigators.

== Early life and education ==
Raad Hashim Mohiaddin was born around 1957. He completed a medical degree and subsequently obtained a master's degree (MSc) from the University of London in 1985. Subsequently, he completed his PhD in 1994 at the University of London on Structural and functional evaluation of atherosclerotic vascular disease by magnetic resonance imaging: Feasibility, techniques and applications.

== Career ==
Mohiaddin started working at the Royal Brompton Hospital, in the late 1980s where he was instrumental in establishing and promoting a successful cardiovascular magnetic resonance at the Royal Brompton. Alongside his clinical and teaching commitments, Mohiaddin undertook research and became professor of cardiovascular imaging at the National Heart and Lung Institute at Imperial College, London, and Royal Brompton Hospital. In 1991 and 1993, he won the William S. Moore award of the International Society of Magnetic Resonance in Medicine, the society's highest honor for medical investigators. He is a fellow of the Royal College of Physicians, the Royal College of Radiologists and the European Society of Cardiology. He has spoken on the use of cardiovascular magnetic resonance worldwide.

== Research ==
Mohiaddin has wide interests relating to cardiac imaging especially with the use of cardiovascular magnetic resonance and congenital heart disease, valve disease, myocardial and pericardial disease and coronary and cardiac flow. He has published 195 articles indexed in the medical library (Pubmed) by 2016. His work has been cited in multiple guidelines on valve disease, congenital disease and imaging by the European Society of Cardiology, European Society of Cardiovascular Imaging and the Society of Cardiovascular Magnetic Resonance.

== Conviction for tax fraud ==
In 2015, Mohiaddin admitted at Blackfriars Crown Court to a tax fraud of £409,611 and was sentenced to 15 months in jail suspended for two years and fined an additional £200,000.

== Selected publications ==
- MRI atlas of normal anatomy, Kluwer, 1992. (With D.B. Longmore) ISBN 978-0792389743
- An introduction to cardiovascular magnetic resonance, Current Medical Literature, 2002. ISBN 1850091722
- An atlas of contrast-enhanced angiography: Three-dimensional magnetic resonance angiography, CRC Press, 2003. (Editor with Nicholas Bunce) (Encyclopedia of Visual Medicine Series) ISBN 1842140817
- Magnetic resonance imaging of congenital heart disease, Springer, 2012. (Editor with Mushabbar A. Syed) ISBN 978-1447142669
- Treasure T, Pepper J, Mohiaddin R, 2015, "Atenolol versus Losartan in Marfan's syndrome", N Engl J Med, Vol. 372, pp. 978–979.
- Pepper J, Goddard M, Mohiaddin R, et al., 2015, "Histology of a Marfan aorta 4.5 years after personalized external aortic root support", Eur J Cardiothorac Surg, Vol. 48, pp. 502–505.
