= Güven, Midyat =

Güven
- Neighbourhood
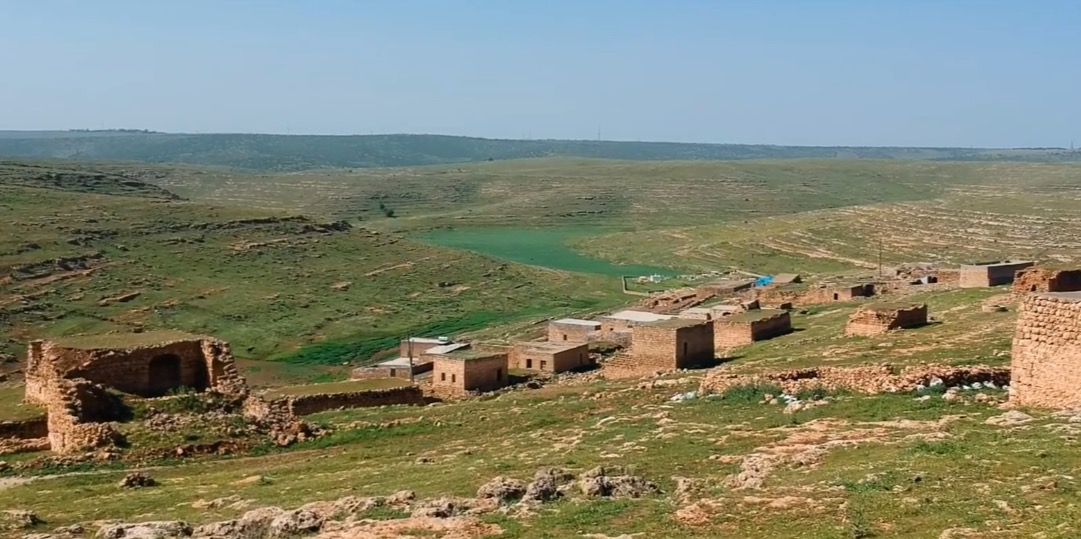

- Location within Turkey
- Coordinates: 37.359°N 41.390°E
- Country: Turkey
- Province: Mardin
- District: Midyat
- Population (2021): 67
- Time zone: UTC+3 (TRT)

Güven (Kurdish: Bacin, Bicin), historically known as Bajenne is a neighbourhood located in the municipality and district of Midyat, Mardin Province in Turkey. The village is located ca. 8 kilometres (5.0 mi) south of Midyat town centre.

The village is populated by Kurds of the Şemikan tribe and has a population of 67 in 2021.

== Information ==
The Kurds in the village are Yazidis of the Şemikan tribe. While the Şemikan tribe in Güven are Yazidi, the ones in nearby Sivrice (Dalîn) village are Muslim.

The village experienced mass emigration in the 1980s to especially Germany resulting in only few elderly to remain by the 1990s. The village took in Yazidi refugees fleeing the genocide perpetuated by ISIS in 2014.

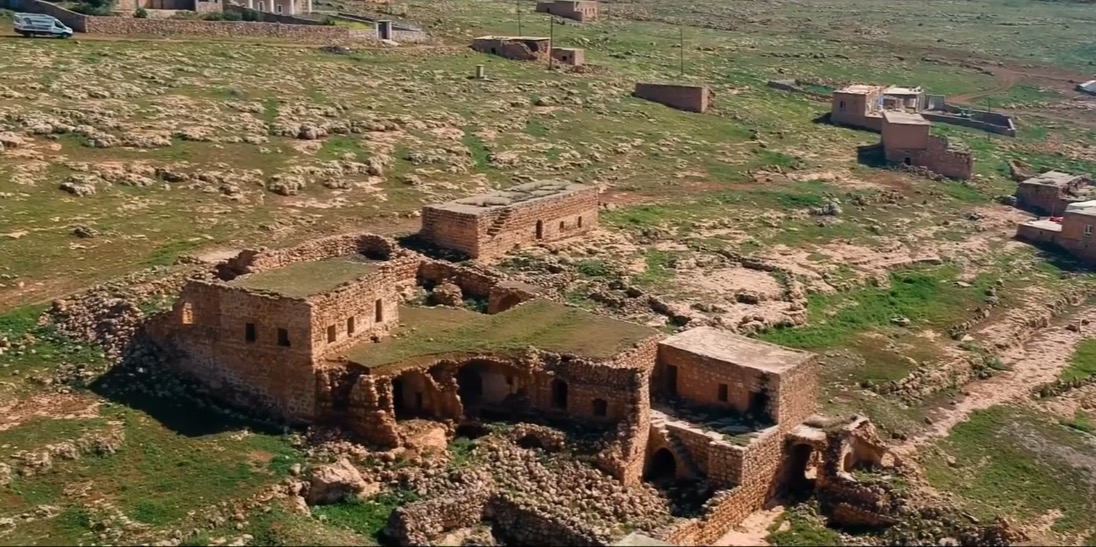
Another view of Baçin (2018)

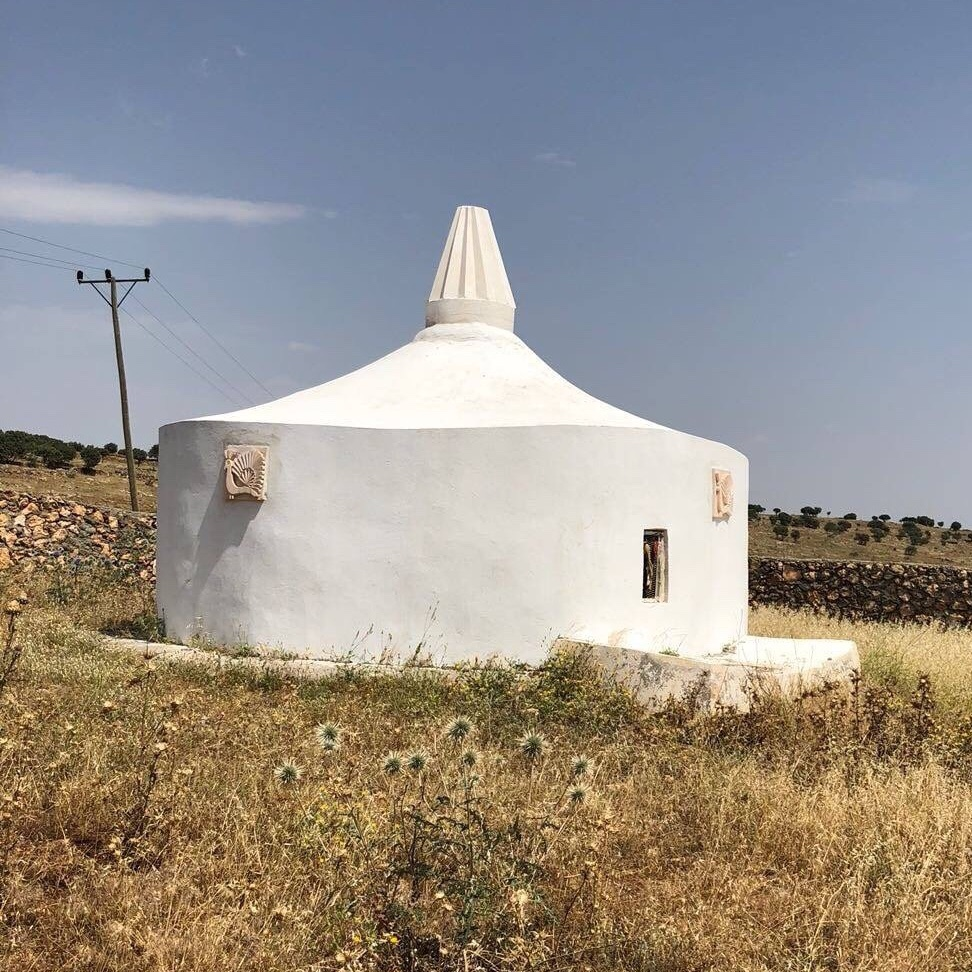
Yazidi temple in Baçin (2018)
