= Raad Salam Naaman =

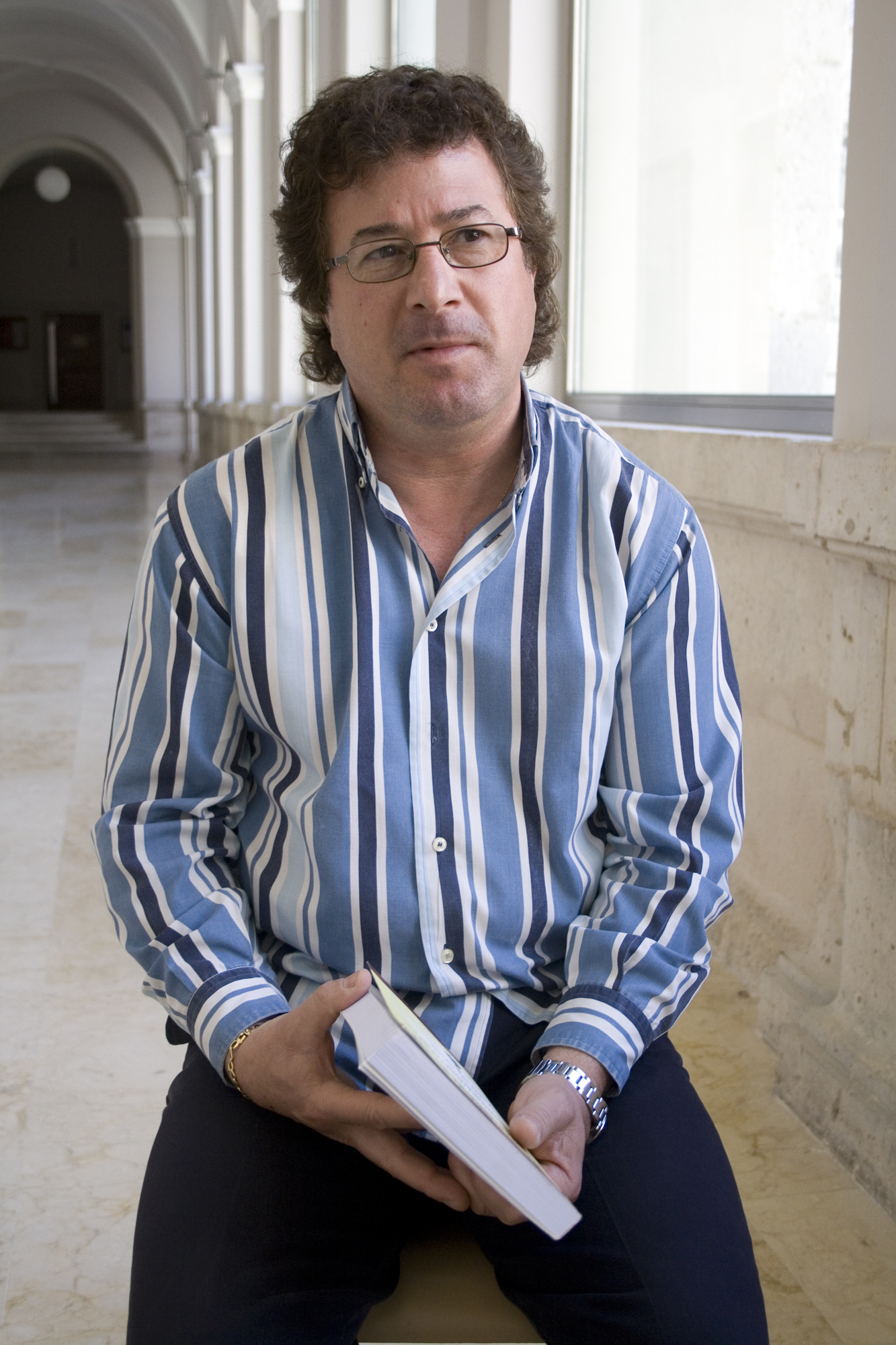
- Raad Salam Naaman in 2011.
- Born: 1959 (age 66–67); Mosul, Iraq
- Occupations: Author, teacher, politician
- Political party: Vox

Raad Salam Naaman (born 1959) is an Iraqi-born Spanish author, translator, academic and politician.

== Biography ==
Naaman was born to a Chaldean Catholic Assyrian family in Mosul, Iraq in 1959. He moved to Basra where he graduated with degrees in Arabic and Islamic Studies and then economics from the University of Basra. He was conscripted into the Iraqi army during the Iraq-Iran war and the first Gulf War but faced persecution due his pacifist beliefs and was granted asylum in Spain in 1992 before becoming a Spanish citizen in 1999.

In 2011, Naaman became a professor at the Biblical and Oriental Institute in León and taught ecumenical studies of the Pontifical University of Salamanca.

Naaman has also authored several books including In the name of God of the three monotheistic religions: Judaism, Christianity and Islam (2012) and All about Islam (2013).

Naaman joined the Vox political party in 2016 and announced his intention to stand as a candidate on the municipal list in León, arguing that Spain should defend its Christian culture, oppose the Islamization of Europe and claimed the political left were facilitating Islamism. In 2018, during a public debate in Melilla, Naaman argued that 20% of the world's Muslim population "are radical and fanatical" and "believe in jihad." In response, Podemos accused Naaman of inciting religious and racial hatred. Naaman responded by stating that his argument had not been directed at the entire Muslim community.

== Bibliography ==
=== Books ===
- The Story of Free Poetry in Iraq, (Basra), 1979.
- What is the Islam?, Ed. Sanabil (Cairo), 2008.
- In the name of God of the three monotheistic religions: Judaism, Christianity and Islam
- Unveiling Islam, Monte Riego (León), 2012.
- All about Islam, Monte Riego (León), 2013.
- This is Islam, Monte Riego (León), 2015.
- All about Judaism, Monte Riego (León), 2017.

=== Arabic to Spanish translations ===
- Abū Rifá´a ´Umara B. Waŧyma Al-Gany: The Beginning of Creation and the Stories of the Prophets, 2008.
