= Tesqopa =

Town in Nineveh, Iraq

Tesqopa ܬܠܐ ܙܩܝܦܐ تسقوبا
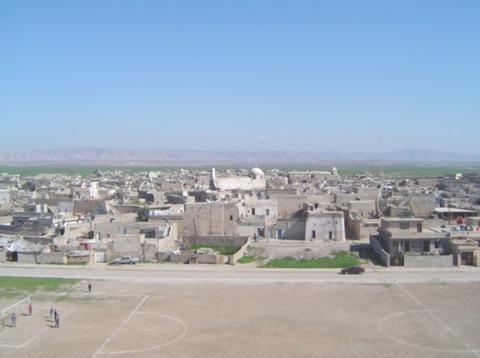

- Location within Iraq
- Coordinates: 36°35′50.72″N 43°6′13.40″E
- Country: Iraq
- Federal region: Kurdistan Region (de facto)
- Governorate: Nineveh
- District: Tel Kaif

Population (2020)
  - Total: 4,185
- Time zone: GMT +3

A view of Tesqopa in August 2005

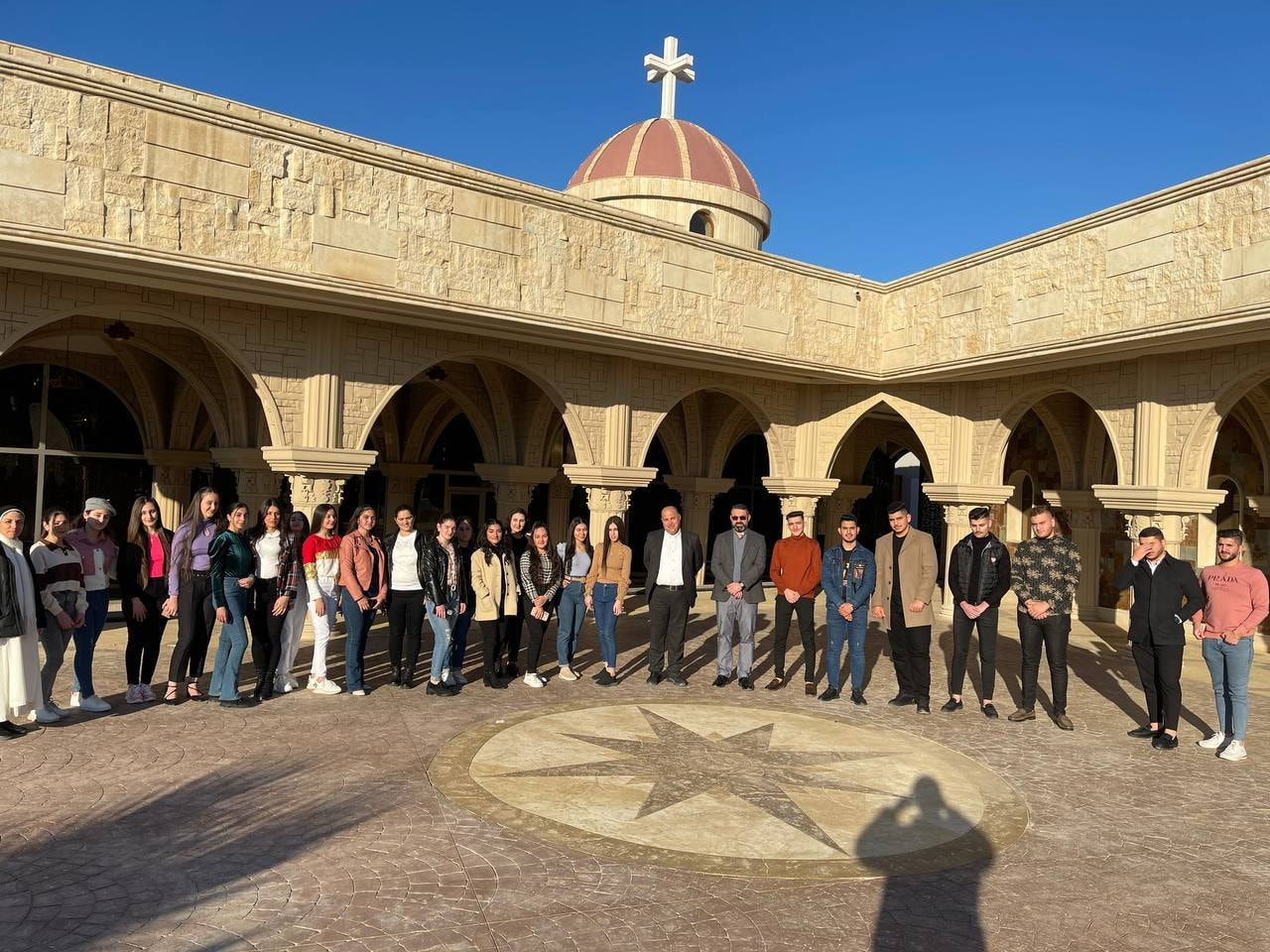
A Catholic church in Tesqopa

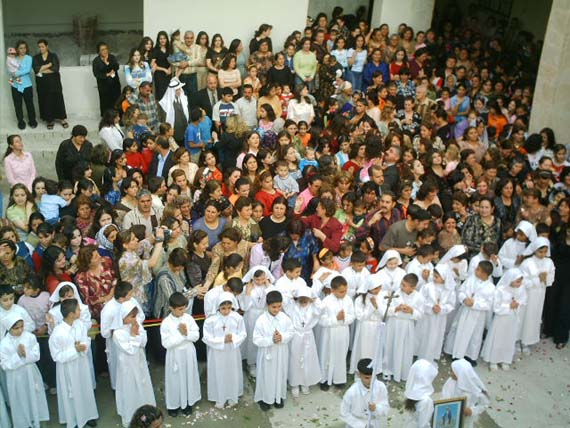
Chaldean Catholic ceremony

Tesqopa (Syriac: ܬܠܐ ܙܩܝܦܐ, Arabic: تسقوبا) or Tel Skuf (Arabic: تللسقف, Kurdish: Tilesqof), also Tel Eskof or Tall Asqaf is a town in northern Iraq located approximately 19 miles (31 km) north of Mosul. The town is populated by Assyrians who are members of the Chaldean Catholic Church.

The town was captured by ISIS briefly in August 2014 but was recaptured by Kurdish Peshmerga in August 2016. Many of the residents of the town returned with aid from Hungary, while a large portion has migrated to Europe.

== Name ==
The name of the town is originally Tilla Zqīpā (Classical Syriac: ܬܸܠܵܐ ܙܩܝܼܦܵܐ), meaning “The high hill,” which later developed into Tisqōpa (Syriac: ܬܸܣܩܘܿܦܵܐ), the name used today.

== Early history ==
Tesqopa is not mentioned in Thomas of Marga's Book of Governors (c. 840) or any of the other early monastic histories of the Church of the East, and may well have been founded as late as the Seljuq period, perhaps in the eleventh century. It is first mentioned as a Christian village in a thirteenth-century poem by the Assyrian writer Giwargis Warda. This poem describes its sack by a raiding band of Mongols in November 1235 and the destruction of its church of Mar Yaʿqōḇ (Jacob/James) the Recluse.

Tesqopa was subject to many attacks by the Mongols, the worst among them was the massacre of 1436 by the Qara Qoyunlus under Jahan Shah when they attacked the town, killing thousands of its Assyrian inhabitants and burning its crops and churches, ultimately forcing the rest of the inhabitants to flee to the mountains. In 1508, Tesqopa was attacked again this time by the Safavids under Ismail I, just as they attacked Tel Keppe, Alqosh and the Monastery of Rabban Hormizd. Tesqopa was also attacked by the army of Nader Shah in 1743 during his march on Mosul following his declaration of war against the Ottoman Empire.

== Modern history ==
The town received many Assyrian Christian refugees from Baghdad and Mosul in the wake of the sectarian violence in the 2000s. On 23 April 2007 a car bomb that targeted the village resulted in more than 25 deaths, mostly civilian Assyrians and Yazidis. Later, the insurgent group Jamaat Ansar al-Sunna claimed responsibility for the bombing and uploaded a video of the operation.

In early August 2014, Islamic State of Iraq and Syria (ISIS) militants captured Tesqopa after heavy fighting. But on 17 August 2014 the Kurdish Peshmerga retook Tesqopa. After this, the local Christian Assyrians were then able to restore the crosses atop their vandalized churches. ISIS militants overran the town at dawn on 3 May 2016; however, they were driven out by Peshmerga fighters later that day.

The village was liberated after combat operations from the Iraqi Ground Forces, the Peshmerga, the US coalition in Iraq, and the Nineveh Plain Protection Units.

=== Post-ISIS ===
By 2017, several hundred families had returned to the town and the parish church was functioning again. The Hungarian government assisted in rebuilding the destroyed homes of 991 Christian families. In the years since, only 20% of Tesqopa's original Assyrian population have returned.

In September 2020, a news release from the Assyrian Policy Institute revealed that the government of the Kurdistan Region of Iraq had been blocking access to a route connecting Tesqopa and Batnaya since March, purportedly to slow the spread of COVID-19. The road was previously closed by KRG forces following the 2017 Kurdistan Region independence referendum, but was reopened the following year due to pressure from US officials.

== Notable people ==
- Raad Salam Naaman (born 1959), Iraqi-born Spanish author, translator and academic.
