= Bardarash =

- Town
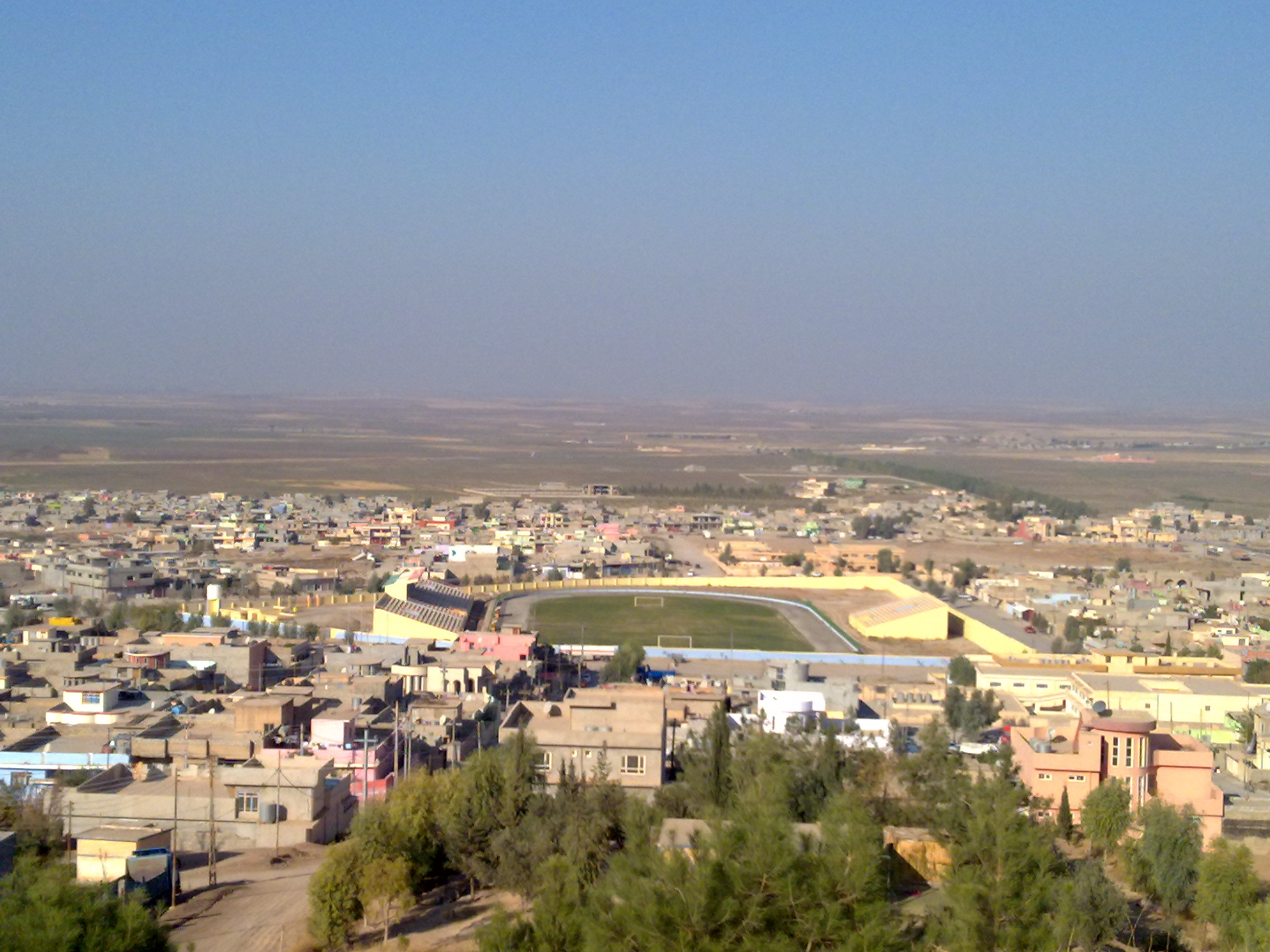

- Location in Iraq Bardarash (Iraqi Kurdistan)
- Coordinates: 36°30′12.2″N 43°35′14″E
- Country: Iraq
- Region: Kurdistan Region (de facto)
- Governorate: Nineveh Governorate (de jure); Dohuk Governorate (de facto)
- District: Akre District (de jure); Bardarash (de facto)
- Sub-district: Bardarash

Population (2014)
  - Town: 30,331
  - Urban: 25,263
  - Rural: 5,068

Bardarash (Arabic: بردرش, Kurdish: بەردەڕەش, romanized: Berdereş) or ʿAshā'ir al-Sabaʿ (Arabic: عشائر السبع) is a town and subdistrict in Nineveh Governorate, Iraq. It is regarded as part of Akre District in the Nineveh Governorate by the Iraqi government, however, it is de facto controlled by the Kurdistan Regional Government, as part of the Bardarash district of the Dohuk Governorate.

Bardarash is mostly inhabited by Sunni Muslims.

== Etymology ==
The Kurdish name of the town is derived from "ber" ("stone" in Kurdish) and "reş" ("black" in Kurdish), and thus translates to "black stone", whereas the Arabic name ʿAshā'ir al-Sabaʿ translates to "seven clans" in reference to the seven clans that reside at Bardarash: the Zangana, Darbazi, Bot, Razgary, Gezh, Chopani, and the Řožbayānī.

== History ==
Prior to the 19th century, Bardarash was recorded by travellers and historians as one of a number of Yazidi-majority villages situated west of Erbil, alongside Kalak (Eski Kalak), Harir, and Chira.

Between 1832 and 1834, Bardarash was among the Yazidi areas affected by the genocidal campaign led by Muhammad Pasha of Rawanduz, Emir of Soran, known as Mîr-i-Kura ("the one-eyed prince"), against the Yazidi communities across the Nineveh Plain and Sheikhan district. Following the campaign, Bardarash and other formerly Yazidi villages in the area were subsequently seized and underwent demographic Islamization by Sunni Kurds.

In the aftermath of the First World War, Ismāʿīl Agha and Ḥājjī Agha were noted as the tribal leaders of the ʿAshā'ir al-Sabaʿ by British intelligence at the onset of the British administration of Iraq. Ismāʿīl Agha was the head of the Bizaini section of ʿAshā'ir al-Sabaʿ and was known to be pro-British. He suffered considerably due to the proximity of the Assyrian refugee camp at Mindan in 1920 and his rivalry with Ḥājjī ʿAbdallāh ibn Raḥmān of Jujjar in the Aqra district was observed in a British intelligence report in 1923.

In 1997, 79 villages were recorded as part of the Bardarash subdistrict with a total population of 47,564 people. A camp was established at Bardarash for Iraqis displaced by the Islamic State of Iraq and the Levant and was later semi-decommissioned in December 2017. The camp was reopened for refugees in October 2019, and over 7000 Kurds from northern Syria who had fled the 2019 Turkish offensive into north-eastern Syria arrived within a week. The camp's population grew to an estimated 11,000 refugees by November, of whom roughly 75% were women and children, and reached 14,031 refugees by July 2020. By June 2021, 13,986 refugees had left after having obtained residency permits in the Kurdistan Region whilst 1488 had returned to Syria, leaving 3541 at the camp.

== Gallery ==
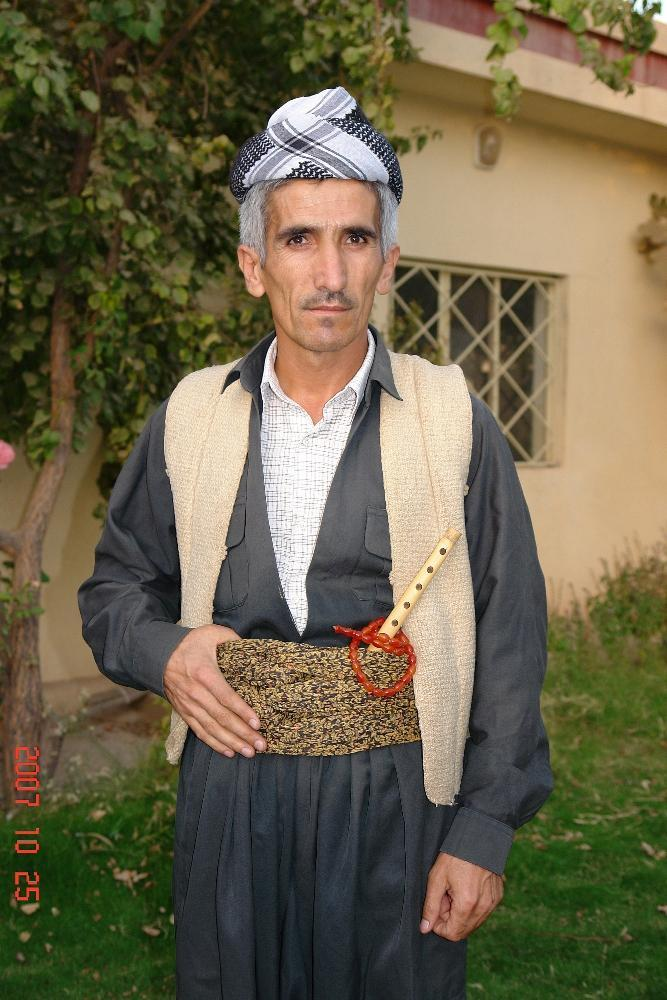
Man from Bardarash in traditional attire

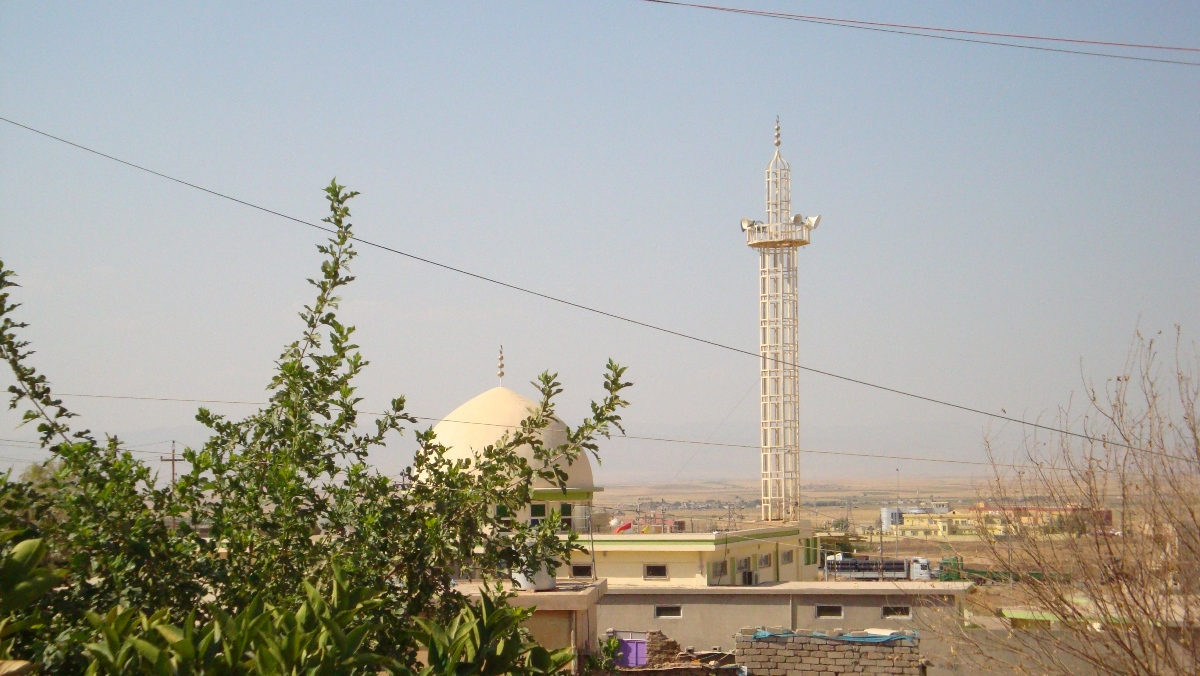
Mosque at Bardarash

== Bibliography ==
- Chyet, Michael L. (2003). Kurdish–English Dictionary. Yale University Press.
- Findahl, Jon (2019). "Collecting contemporary knowledge on Gorani spoken east of Mosul". In I. M. Nick (ed.). Forensic Linguistics: Asylum-seekers, Refugees and Immigrants. Vernon Press. pp. 57–74.
- Stansfield, Gareth R. V. (2003). Iraqi Kurdistan: Political Development and Emergent Democracy. Routledge.
- Zaken, Mordechai (2007). Jewish Subjects and Their Tribal Chieftains in Kurdistan: A Study in Survival. Brill.
