= Qewls =

Sacred hymns in Yazidism

- Qewl
- Illustration of Yazidi Qewals, by Austen Henry Layard (1859)

Information
- Religion: Yazidism
- Author: Yazidi holy figures
- Language: Kurmanji
- Period: Traditionally the Yazidi "epoch of the saints", the time of Sheikh Adi and his disciples

Qewls (Kurdish: Qewl; also transliterated Qawls; singular Qewl or Qawl; from Arabic: قول, romanized: qawl, lit. 'word') are the sacred hymns of the Yazidis and the most authoritative form of Yazidi religious literature. They are composed mostly in Kurmanji and have been handed down chiefly by oral transmission among the Yazidi clergy, who sing them to set melodies at religious rites and festivals. The corpus is large and covers the creation of the world, the nature of God, ethics, the fate of the soul after death, and the lives of holy figures. Yazidism has no single written scripture, as such, the qewls fill that role.

In Yazidi belief the qewls were given to the community not through prophets but directly by God and by angels who appeared in human form. Tradition attributes the present corpus to Şêx Fexredîn and other disciples of Sheikh Adi.

== Terminology ==
The word qewl is Arabic for "word". In Yazidi understanding it is the word of God sent down from above to the Yazidis as guidance, and among Yazidi texts the qewls rank first in sanctity and are the most authoritative for believers.

Yazidis call the qewls "the knowledge of God" (ilmê Xwedê) and, as a symbol of esoteric knowledge, "the ocean" (behr). Experts describe them as "the sayings of God", or as the sayings of saints that God sent through them to his people. The word also used outside Yazidism; Kurds in Turkey apply qewl to short narratives about the history of a clan or tribe.

Yazidi sacred texts are divided by form into qewls, beyts, qasidas, robarins, payizoks, duas and dirozes, each with its own purpose. Of these genres the qewls are considered the most important.

== Origin and composition ==
=== Date & authorship ===
In Yazidi belief the qewls are of divine origin. They are held to be the word of God, or the words of holy men who possessed divine power (keramet) and esoteric knowledge and passed them to the community at God's command. Accounts told before the recitation of individual qewls, such as those about Bav Bekirê Omera and Pîr Şeref, present them as composed by figures around Sheikh Adi after personal ordeals or acts of devotion. The authors are widely regarded as historical persons. The Yazidis call the period when the disciples of Sheikh Adi spread his teaching, and the community became uniform in doctrine and cult, the "epoch of the saints".

The qewls are traditionally placed in the time of Sheikh Adi and the period immediately after him. Scholars who have studied them note that they differ in content and style, and that the corpus is likely to include works by several composers over a span of time. The place-names and historical figures in the texts, and the layers of ideas they contain, give some indication of date, though material added during transmission means that content alone is not a firm guide. Whether language can serve as a dating criterion is debated. Philip Kreyenbroek holds that in a mainly oral tradition it cannot, while the Yazidi scholar Bedelê Feqîr Hecî argues that language and the use of terms and symbols can indicate both a text's age and its authenticity.

The qewls and beyts are held to contain the foundations of the "science of God and Sheikh Adi" (ilmê Xwedê û Şîxadî), which was passed to Şêx Fexredîn, who with other disciples composed the sacred texts and spread them among the faithful. Most qewls were composed by Şêx Fexredîn. In his time there are said to have been some 12,000 qewls, of which roughly 130–140 survive. Besides Fexredîn, qewls are ascribed to a range of historical and legendary figures, among them Babekrê Omera, Dawûdî bin Derman, Pîr Reşê Heyran and Sheikh Mend. The name of the author usually appears near the end of the text in a formula meaning "from the words of ...", or the qewl is titled after him. In some cases a name may instead refer to a revered figure mentioned in the text, and even experts can find it hard to tell which, since oral transmission leaves no independent record of attribution. Many qewls name no author and are known only as part of the tradition.

Linguists have concluded that the authors were highly educated for their time, with a knowledge of philosophy, theology and linguistics and of the main religious teachings and their scriptures. The texts are composed in the dialect of the Yazidis of Sheikhan, the area where they are believed to have originated, which has lexical and grammatical features absent from other Kurmanji dialects. Researchers including Kreyenbroek and Spät have suggested that many of the ideas in the qewls probably existed before Sheikh Adi's arrival in the form of storylines as myths and legends, and that many hymns were composed on their basis. Khanna Omarkhali also hypothesises that the storylines, which have analogues in Yarî and some Zoroastrian traditions, share a common origin that probably goes back either to the Indo-Iranian tradition or to local variants common to the region.

=== Mode of composition ===
According to Yazidi tradition, the faith originally had no written scripture. Commandments and laws received from messengers of God and from saints were transmitted orally. They were later written down, but persecution caused them to revert to oral transmission in the form of qewls.

For centuries the qewls have been passed from one generation of clergy to the next by mouth. Each text has its own melody and is sung to the accompaniment of traditional musical instruments. These include the daf (tambourine) and the shabab (a flute), played in the ritual known as sama and at other religious rites and festivals. Some qewls are not tied to any particular rite and are performed only occasionally at festivals and sermons.

Whether the earliest qewls were composed orally or in writing is not settled. Kreyenbroek and Rashow observed that in one qewl the author speaks of holding a pen of aloe wood, which would be unexpected in an oral poet, and that the complexity of several poems, their lack of repetition and their infrequent use of standard formulas might lead one to surmise that at least some were composed in writing, though they regarded the evidence as inconclusive. A beyt mentions the "Book of the Angel Fexredîn" (Deftera Ezîz Melek Fexredîn), which Yazidi experts often describe as the ecstatic state and prescience of the Angel Fexredin rather than a real book. Since tradition ascribes most texts to Fexredîn, Omarkhali suggests that references to his notebook (defter) may bear on whether writing played a role in composition. She notes that there is no definitive knowledge of whether writing was used to compose poetic texts in the time of Sheikh Adi, but considers it likely that in his time and that of his immediate followers oral and written works coexisted, with poetic compositions or lectures intended to be heard and manuscripts serving as a record of more "practical" and possibly historical data.

Although the qewls were preserved orally, many families of Yazidi clergy in Iraq, including in Lalish, also kept written copies in Arabic script. The Peshimam family of the Şêxisin lineage was regarded as the keeper of literacy, its sheikhs able to read and write Arabic, and Melik Şêxisin (Sheikh Hasan) is held to have been the keeper of the pen (qalam) and the author of many religious texts. Manuscripts known as mishur, which record the lives of saints, are another written source.

== Language and form ==
Practically all qewls are composed in Kurmanji, although some individual couplets are in Arabic, Persian and Turkic. The language of the hymns is a register of religious discourse and differs from everyday speech. Its vocabulary may seem archaic to speakers of the modern dialect and includes rarely used old Kurdish words and religious terminology. Its grammar does not always follow the norms of the literary language, and as in other poetry the word order often departs from that of prose. The language is also marked by a variety of expressive means and heavy use of metaphor, and its rich vocabulary is of interest to linguists. Linguists have concluded that the authors were highly educated for their time, with a knowledge of philosophy, theology and linguistics and of the main religious teachings and their scriptures.

The Qewls were composed in the dialect of the Yazidis of Sheikhan, where they originated, and are mostly in that dialect, which has lexical and grammatical features absent from other Kurmanji dialects. In other regions they may circulate in the local dialect, keeping the original vocabulary and meaning but with their morphemes adapted to local speech.

Individual couplets of Qewls are also found in Arabic, Persian and Turkic. The Qewls also contain a large number of key phrases and religious terms largely of Arabic origin. Arabic names of God such as Allah, Ilahi and Rebi appear alongside the Iranian Xwedê. Some have attributed these Arabic names to Islamic influence, but Pirbari notes that they were already in use in pre-Islamic Arabia and Mesopotamia among Assyrians, Arameans, Arab Christians and hanifs. The mixture is taken to reflect the bilingual character of the early community, in a period when Arabic was a language of learning across the Near East. Some Yazidis, in the towns of Bashiqa and Bahzani near Mosul, speak a dialect of Arabic as their mother tongue, and religious literature in Arabic also exists. Bashiqa and Bahzani have long been centres of Yazidi theological instruction.

The language of the Qewls contains terminology characteristic of Sufism, and Yazidi and Sufi literature share motifs and imagery. Pirbari and Shchedrovitsky suggest that this points to a common origin in the non-confessional monotheism of pre-Islamic Arabia, whose adherents were called hanifs, while arguing that Yazidism differs fundamentally from Sufism in its worldview. Pirbari and Mossaki regard the Sufi vocabulary as evidence of a close connection between early Yazidism and Sufism.

Of all categories of Yazidi sacred text, the Qewl is the hardest for ordinary Yazidis to understand. How much a listener grasps depends on religious education, the category of the text and the way it is performed by the reciter. The hymns are difficult for ordinary Yazidis, especially younger people in the diaspora, partly because of the features described above and a very compressed style, but they are comprehensible to those who hear them often, clergy and laymen alike. The language can be perceived as a system of symbols that conveys the Yazidi system of beliefs, but only if it is understood with the help of the serhatî/çîrok tradition. A storyline may be related in a Qewl by only a word or a sentence, and the same epithet may refer to several holy figures, which can cause misinterpretation, so understanding the texts requires wide knowledge of Kurdish and of the Yazidi religious literature and tradition as a whole. The serhatîs/çîroks act as an interpretation of the text, giving a fuller account of the events it relates.

=== Structure ===
The verse of practically all qewls is stanzaic, a stanza being a group of lines that share a rhyme. The number of stanzas can differ between versions of the same qewl. A stanza (sebeq) is a group of lines (mal or rêz) that share a rhyme (qafî). Three lines is typical, though stanzas of two to nine occur, and lines usually have seven or eight syllables, with counts ranging from six to sixteen. Rhyme follows no strict scheme. In some texts the stanzas vary in length and lack end-rhyme altogether, and experts call an intricate arrangement of this kind hur (literally "small"). Yazidi experts call the structure of a text its neqş ("embroidery"), and the sequence of a few stanzas often forms a unit of sense.

The qewls do not follow the quantitative metre of classical Arabic, Persian or Kurdish poetry. Yazidis nonetheless speak of wezin ("metre") in their texts, though it varies even within a single stanza and does not run through a whole text. A Qewl typically has between 25 and 45 stanzas. A few are much longer, and some versions exceed a hundred.

The first and last stanzas often differ in structure from the rest, and recitations are framed by formulas. Reciters in Iraq commonly begin by invoking God as the one who grants leave (Ya bi destûra Xwedê, Xudanê Destûrê). Most hymns end with a formula affirming human imperfection and divine perfection (Em kêm in, Xwedê yî temam e, "we are imperfect, God is perfect") or a first-person variant, or with an exhortation never to forget what has been said. These closings usually follow a remembrance of the reciter's teachers and blessings on those present, and they belong more to the reciter's style than to any particular text. Formulas seldom occur in the body of a Qewl.

Refrains occur in many sacred texts, including Qewls, and in large rituals a lead reciter may be joined by others who chant the refrains or the last line of each stanza together. In some Qewls the first line of a stanza repeats all or part of the last line of the one before. This linking is understood to help fix the order of the stanzas in memory.

=== Melody ===
Qewls are recited in styles ranging from fast, speech-like delivery without melody to intoned and fully melodic performance. Many have a melody of their own, called kubrî (kubir in the Caucasus), which experts describe as high, heavy or quick. Of about a hundred Qewls whose melodies have been documented, around 40 have none, around 40 have a melody unique to the text, and a few share a melody with one other Qewl. A single Qewl may change melody between its beginning, middle and end, sometimes because separate text units were combined, and some are performed to different melodies on different occasions. In Iraq many texts are performed to the accompaniment of the def (frame drum) and şibab (flute).

Melody is regarded as an aid to memory and gives a performance a more solemn character. A reciter usually learns the words of a qewl first and its melody weeks or months later, sometimes from a different teacher, or not at all. A reciter who loses his place while chanting may begin again without the melody and resume it once he remembers. Melodies are fairly constant within a region, but they differ noticeably between Iraq and the Caucasus.

== Content ==
By subject, the qewls are classed as exegetical, cosmogonic, hagiographic, eschatological, didactic and ethical, and some are liturgical, forming part of specific rites. They include theological and philosophical texts, accounts of the creation of the universe, texts on spiritual psychology and ethics, the end of the world, lives of saints and narratives about the prophets of different religions. Some are long narrative poems. Many are cast as dialogues, in which a saint puts questions about the creation and structure of the world to God and receives an answer, or in which the angels question Sultan Ezid. Others personify nature or time and stage debates between the personified figures.

=== Theological and exegetical ===
Theological and philosophical qewls deal with the nature and attributes of God and with the interpretation of Yazidi teaching. They are often compressed, and a question posed in one qewl may be answered in another, so they are read together with the commentary of the ilmdar.

=== Cosmogonic ===
Cosmogonic qewls describe the creation of the universe, of the first human being and of the origin of the Yazidi community. Their imagery is highly metaphorical, and the sequence of events differs between qewls and between variants of the same qewl.

=== Ethical and didactic ===
Ethical and didactic qewls set out principles of conduct and spiritual psychology, including the discipline of speech and of the passions, humility, charity, respect for parents and the pursuit of knowledge.

Social qewls (Qewlên Civatê) are performed at large social gatherings. Advisory qewls (Qewlên Nesîhetê) contain worldly counsel, on subjects such as friendship, kindness and the value of good neighbours.

=== Eschatological ===
Eschatological qewls deal with death, the fate of the soul and the end of the world.

=== Hagiographic ===
Hagiographic qewls narrate the lives of Sheikh Adi, his companions and other figures venerated in Yazidism, some of whom are the subject of long plot-driven qewls of their own that also explain particular rules of the religion. Because Sheikh Adi is regarded as existing outside time and space, figures from different eras can appear together in one text with him at its centre. Some hagiographic qewls contain historical references and are read as reflecting the political circumstances in which the Yazidi community formed around Sheikh Adi.

=== Narratives about other religions ===
A number of qewls deal with the prophets of other religions and refer to the scriptures of Judaism, Christianity and Islam. This is regarded as evidence of wide interconfessional contact and of tolerance toward other faiths, although Yazidi doctrine holds that no foreign prophet is a prophet of the Yazidi religion.

=== Liturgical ===
Liturgical qewls form a necessary part of specific rites and are performed in those settings. They include qewls recited at funerals and at graves, before the opening of sacred objects, at the main festivals, and, in Iraq, at festivals connected with Lalish and at village feasts. A number of qewls form part of the sema, a ceremony that combines qewls with qesîdes. At rituals and festivals a core group of texts is fixed, and other texts recited before or after it vary at the choice of the reciter or the audience.

=== Berane qewls ===
The highest rank among the qewls belongs to the berane qewls, literally "rams' qewls". They are regarded as superior to other qewls and as containing the most important information on Yazidi religion. The category is defined by content and tradition and not by any formal feature, and even knowledgeable Yazidis cannot name all of them. Thirteen qewls are considered berane by all knowledgeable Yazidis, and four more by some. They tend to be long, with many stanzas of deep meaning, and one expert associated the status with texts on creation or philosophy.

A reciter is not normally allowed to study a berane qewl until he knows a number of other qewls, can interpret some of them and has the basic knowledge expected of an expert. He then asks a master for one and is examined before it is taught. He first memorises the text without explanation, and only later is he allowed to study its meaning, an understanding that may deepen over his lifetime.

=== Lineages ===
Some qewls are associated with particular sacred lineages. A hymn devoted to the forefather of a lineage tends to be preserved mainly in the memories of experts from that lineage, though not exclusively.

== Transmission and performance ==
=== Reciters ===
Qewls are preserved and performed by trained reciters. The most common term is qewlbêj ("one who tells qewls"), with qewlzan ("one who knows qewls") and qewlvan as variants. Although the names refer to qewls, they denote an expert in the sacred texts in general. Yazidis of the Caucasus use ulimdar ("possessor of knowledge") and zana ("expert") instead, and ulimdar is also used in Iraq for a person of deep religious learning. A qewlbêj is more than a reciter. He is trained in exegesis, is accepted by the community as an authority on religious knowledge and may become a leader of his local community.

Reciters come from all three hereditary groups; the priestly Sheikh and Pir castes, as well as members of the lay Mirid caste, among them the feqîrs and the qewals. Yazidis recognise grades of competence, from professional experts who devote their lives to the tradition, through reciters who perform at large gatherings and those who know enough texts to conduct the main rituals, to the many who know a few texts and some narratives.

=== Training ===
Training is long and takes place largely within the family. A future reciter must grow up in a Yazidi setting and hear recitations from childhood. Boys usually begin to take an interest at five to seven, often at the side of a grandfather, father or uncle at religious events, and absorb texts passively before studying them actively. Moral instruction accompanies the learning. Evening gatherings in a guest room (ode or diwan), where texts are recited and discussed, are a further school.

A pupil then goes to a religious master (hosta or seyda), sometimes a relative, in whose house he stays for weeks or months and helps with the household work while he learns. He memorises each text stanza by stanza and word for word, taking a few stanzas a day and repeating them back, and learns the melody afterwards. He takes no notes. He learns by imitation, adopting his master's manner of recitation, melodies, explanations and even gestures. The bond lasts for life: a reciter remembers the names of his masters and often cites them after a recitation and when giving a commentary.

Study follows a sequence. A pupil usually begins with the declaration of faith, then prayers and short beyts, and only then the qewls, with some exegesis already known. In Iraq progress is measured by grades, and a teacher may ask a pupil how far he has got, the answer naming the last qewl he has been given. One grade is said to be reached only after about seventy texts. Yazidis speak of "taking" a text from a teacher, and of "having" it rather than knowing it, and those who know texts are said to preserve them "in the chest".

A reciter's standing depends on the size of his repertoire and the depth of his exegesis. Training continues for life. A reciter rehearses daily, even alone, to keep texts from fading, and travels to other masters to learn new texts and compare traditions. He may first perform in public at age of fifteen or sixteen. No ceremony marks the end of training, and he gradually gains larger audiences.

=== Qewals ===
The qewals are a hereditary group of reciters, drawn from the Hekarî and Dumilî Mirîd tribes and living mainly in Bashiqa and Bahzani near Mosul. Until the mid-1920s, children of qewal families learned the texts and the playing of the def and shabab in small evening classes taught by a qewal in these villages. Qewals are best known for the Tawûsgêran, in which they carry the bronze bird image of the Tawûs (the sencaq) to Yazidi villages, open it, perform texts, teach, bring news and collect donations for Lalish. Seven such standards once served seven regions, and now two are carried, for Sheikhan and Shingal.

In the sema, five qewals sit beside the procession. Two play the shabab (from the Hekarî tribe, on the right) and three the def (from the Dumilî, on the left), and they chant the hymns. A qewal known for reciting many qewls and explaining their meaning, called a sencaqbegî, usually delivers the sermon.

=== Women ===
Reciting and expounding qewls is traditionally a male preserve, and women do not recite them in public. Daughters of priestly families hold priestly status, but the sacred texts are kept chiefly in the memories of men. Women nonetheless take part in transmission. They often know the daily prayers and ritual texts better than men, know many narratives and beyts, and some know qewls, though reciting them lies outside their duty. Girls who listen to teaching alongside their brothers or from an adjoining room have learned hymns together with their melodies, and women have taught the boys of their families and recited before female audiences.

=== Performance ===
Qewls are performed from memory, never from notes. Performances fall into three groups by function: liturgy in rituals and gatherings, teaching and edification, and rehearsal to keep a reciter's repertoire from fading.

At funerals, at graves and before sacred objects are opened, a qewl is recited by two reciters, rarely three, at the same time. The congregation stands or sits in silence and no questions are asked. In Armenia and Georgia a short prayer follows a qewl to confirm it, and qewls there were recited almost only at funerals and major feasts, or at other gatherings when an older listener asked for one. Where a qewl forms part of a rite its core is fixed, while the texts recited before or after it vary.

At social gatherings the reciter chooses his texts to suit the audience, the place and the occasion, answers questions, and among Armenian Yazidis might compete with another expert. The mishabet (sermon), given by a qewlbêj or qewal at major festivals, funerals and the Tawûsgêran, weaves quotations from qewls, beyts and qesides into an improvised discourse on a chosen theme within the commentary tradition. In Iraq a sema is preceded by one. The sema and the mishabet are absent among the Yazidis of the Caucasus.

A reciter of a qewl in Iraq keeps his head covered and goes barefoot. He sits still, moving only slightly, and performs with more restraint than in reciting a beyt. He varies pace, pitch and volume and uses pauses to mark important passages. Listeners are expected to be silent, children included, and the greater the stillness, the more important or moving the recitation is judged to be. Some listeners close their eyes. Between stanzas the reciter explains the text in plain speech and tells stories to hold attention, and he usually ends by urging his listeners to heed the words of the tradition.

Kreyenbroek has suggested that qewl-singing is not primarily meant to be understood, its significance lying in the sacred act of singing. Khanna Omarkhali agrees that this can be so in Iraq at large festivals and when qewals recite, but holds that the occasion as a whole is meant to make the texts understandable, and in Armenia and Georgia explanation after a recitation is considered essential.

A reciter may pause between texts but may not skip a stanza. He may stop to explain a stanza with a story and then resume, and if he falters another expert in the audience may take up the text.

=== Memorisation and variation ===
Qewls are memorised word for word, "syllable by syllable". A reciter is not a composer in the sense of the oral poets who recreate a song in each performance. He is expected to repeat the text exactly as taught and to invent nothing to fill a lapse. If he forgets a stanza he starts again or stops and apologises. Creativity is confined to the commentary. Yazidi tradition treats each qewl as a fixed text, regards every recitation as a rendering of an ideal form and forbids changes.

Several features support accuracy. Rhyme, refrains and the repetition of a stanza's last line at the start of the next help to preserve the order of the stanzas. In large rituals a text is recited by two, three, seven or even nine reciters together. Public performances are more fixed than private ones, and reciters of higher standing make fewer errors.

Recordings nonetheless show variants of the same qewl. Stanzas, lines or phrases may be omitted or moved, a different holy figure may be named as the subject of the same act, regional speech may replace words, and a phrase may be repeated through a lapse of memory. The sequence of subjects normally stays the same. Endings change more readily than beginnings, and additions are rare. Substitutions of figures stay within a local framework, since not every holy figure can appear in every action. Material missing from one recording can return in a later one.

Variants cluster in regional "chains" of tradition, each with its own repertoire, manner of reciting, opening and closing formulas and dialect and, less often, melody. Persecution, migration and the lapse of the rituals to which certain texts belong have led to texts being forgotten or altered in some communities, most visibly in the Caucasus, where texts tied to rites such as the sema fell out of use with them.

A single qewl may exist in several variants, and details found in one can be absent from another. Printed versions of the same qewl can differ in the number of stanzas, one being published with 21 stanzas where a fuller version has 41, and a qewl known in one community may not be preserved in others.

=== Interpretation ===
A qewl often does not set out its subject in full. Interpretation is the task of specialists called ulmdar ("bearers of knowledge"), who explain each verse, and a question raised in one qewl may be answered in another. Details of the creation of the first humans, for example, are scattered across qewls on different subjects, and one variant of a creation qewl names Adam's son Shahid ibn Jar ("son of the jar") while another does not. Each qewl is also accompanied by a prose narrative (serhati) that tells its story in more detail.

Many qewls are understood only through the body of prose narratives that supplies the stories they allude to. The hymns are poetic, implicit and recited by trained men, while the narratives are plain, explicit and known to all, women included. A reciter is not accepted as an expert until he has mastered this commentary, and he adjusts its depth to his audience, giving fuller and more varied explanations to knowledgeable listeners.

== Role in Yazidism and study ==
Because Yazidism has no scripture, the qewls hold the place that sacred books hold in other religions. In Yazidi belief truth resides in the qewls and in the community of the feqirs, and the faith rests on the qewls together with the xirqe, the robe of the Yazidi ascetic clergy. The four scriptures of the Abrahamic religions (the Torah, Psalms, Gospel and Quran) are held to contain parts of the truth, while the qewls carry the highest authority because they came directly from God and his angels and not through human prophets.

The qewls are regarded as among the most informative sources for the study of Yazidism, because they preserve both historical information and the meaning of the religion's symbols and attributes. Their cosmogony is described as original and still little studied.

Qewls were first printed in Kurmanji in Arabic script in Baghdad in 1979, edited by Pir Xidir Silêman and Khalil Jindi Rashow, who are regarded as founders of modern Yazidi studies. A Latin-script edition followed in 1995. Partial English translations began to appear in the 1990s. Pirbari and Mossaki criticise earlier printed texts and translations for misprints and other errors, and have prepared texts approved by the Council of Clergy of the Spiritual Council of Yazidis in Georgia. In 2016 a poetic Russian translation of a selection of qewls was published in Moscow and Tbilisi, made from literal translations and commentary by Pirbari, a bearer of the Yazidi oral tradition and an orientalist. The translator aimed first to convey the depth and layered meaning of the texts and only second to reproduce their outer form.

== See also ==
- Yazidi literature
- Yazidi social organization
- List of Yazidi holy figures

== Bibliography ==
- Pirbari, Dimitri; Shchedrovitsky, Dmitry (2016). Тайна жемчужины. Езидская теософия и космогония [The Mystery of the Pearl: Yazidi Theosophy and Cosmogony] (in Russian). Moscow; Tbilisi: Tbilisi Center for Yazidi Studies; Spiritual Council of Yazidis in Georgia. ISBN 978-5-906045-15-7.
- Pirbari, D. V.; Mossaki, N. Z. (2020). "Сказание о Пире Дауде" [The Hymn of Pir Dawid]. Письменные памятники Востока (in Russian). 17 (3): 115–126. doi:10.17816/WMO46774.
- Pirbari, D. V.; Mossaki, N. Z. (2021). "Езидское сказание о Дануне Мисри (Зу-н-Нуне аль-Мисри)" [The Yezidi Hymn of Danūnē Miṣrī (Dhu 'l-Nūn al-Miṣrī)]. Шаги/Steps (in Russian). 7 (2): 212–227. doi:10.22394/2412-9410-2021-7-2-212-227.
- Omarkhali, Khanna (2017). The Yezidi Religious Textual Tradition, from Oral to Written: Categories, Transmission, Scripturalisation and Canonisation of the Yezidi Oral Religious Texts. Studies in Oriental Religions. Vol. 72. Wiesbaden: Harrassowitz Verlag. ISBN 978-3-447-10856-0.
