= Yezidism in Georgia =

Ethno-religious group in Georgia

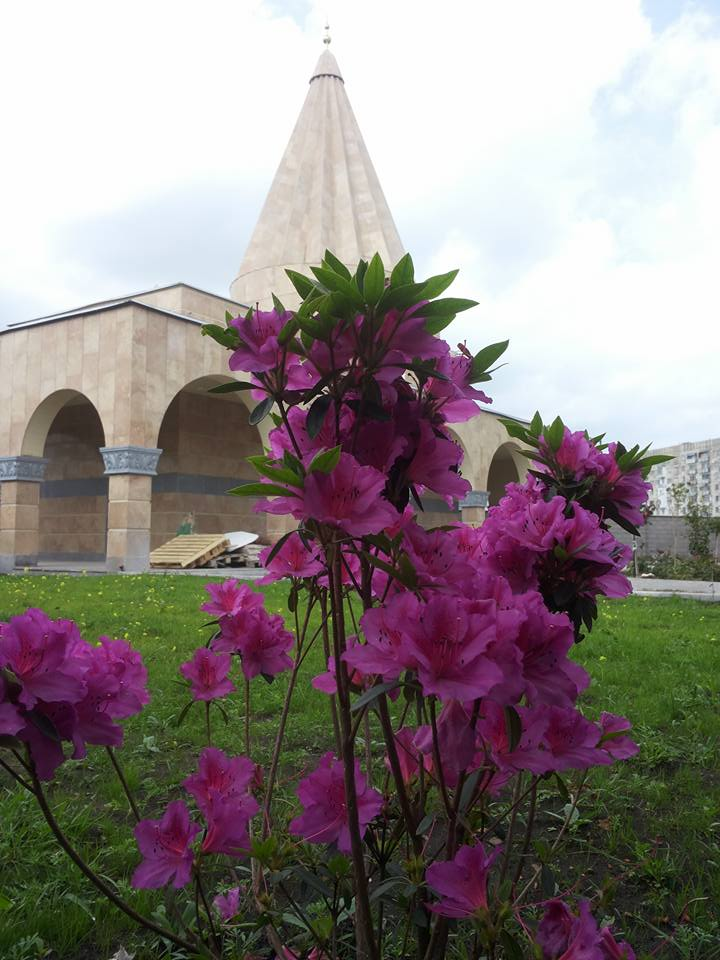
- Sultan Ezid Temple in Tbilisi, Georgia

Total population
- 12,174 (2014, census)

Regions with significant populations
- Tbilisi

Languages
- Kurmanji Kurdish, Georgian

Yazidism in Georgia refers to adherents of Yazidism among Kurds in Georgia. Yazidis of Georgia fled from the Ottoman Empire due to persecution in the 19th and early 20th centuries and sought refuge in Georgia.

== History ==
The earliest documented evidence of Yazidi contact with Georgia dates to the second half of the 18th century, connected to the persecution the Yazidis suffered in the Ottoman Empire, where, not being classified as Ahl al-Kitab, they faced forced conversion to Islam, emigration, or death. Seeking allies against the Ottomans during the Russo-Turkish War, Heraclius II, King of Kartli and Kakheti (r. 1762–1798), corresponded with the Assyrian patriarch to recruit both Assyrians and Yazidis, extending an invitation to the Yazidi chieftain of the Mahmudi region (near Van), Choban (Mîro) Agha, to join the fight against the Turks. A planned joint campaign toward Akhaltsikhe in April 1770 collapsed after the Russian commander withdrew his troops. On 13 August 1770, both the Assyrian bishop Isaiah and Choban Agha sent letters to Heraclius II pledging loyalty and requesting protection for the Yazidi community, including the fortress of Khoshab as a refuge. Heraclius forwarded the letters to Russian authorities, but received no response.

In 1778, Heraclius II dispatched a cavalry unit to help around 200 Yazidi families flee persecution under Ahmad Khan and resettle in the Kakheti region, though only a fraction of them ultimately reached Georgia; Choban Agha personally accompanied the group and remained as the king's guest until 1779. According to Yazidi tradition, some members of the Mahmudi tribes who migrated from Van also settled for a time near Mount Aragats before some eventually returned there.

In 1919, the Yazidis received permission from the Georgian government to register an organization called The National Council of Yazidis in Tbilisi.

The 1970s and 1980s are remembered by many Georgian Yazidis as a "golden era." During the tenure of Eduard Shevardnadze as First Secretary of the Communist Party of Georgia (1972–1985), a series of decisions in 1974, 1978, and 1980 expanded Yazidi access to higher education, including a law—in force until 1988—granting Yazidis preferential university admission. Kurdish-language courses continued at Tbilisi University, and the community's intelligentsia grew to include over a hundred lawyers, teachers, and architects, alongside song and dance ensembles and a wave of poetry publications by Yazidi authors.

In 1978, Soviet authorities established a Kurdish Editorial Board at the state radio station, broadcasting programmes in Kurmanji, and in 1979 the Kurdish Theatre opened in Tbilisi. In March 1981, the government held the Days of Kurdish Culture in Tbilisi to mark the 60th anniversary of Soviet rule in Georgia, featuring concerts, theatre performances, and exhibitions by Yazidi artists. In 1982, Georgian state television broadcast the documentary We Are the Kurds (Georgian: ჩვენ ქურთები ვართ), directed by Gia Chubabria and focused on the local Yazidi community.

By the late 1980s, growing Georgian nationalist sentiment—culminating in the country's declaration of independence in 1991—began to affect ethnic minorities. The State Programme for the Georgian Language, published in December 1988 and formally adopted in August 1989, made Georgian compulsory nationwide, a move perceived by minority communities as signalling their diminished status.

In the late 1990s, the main issue among the Yazidi community of Georgia was the construction of a Yazidi temple and cultural centre on the outskirts of Tbilisi, which marked a significant milestone among the Yazidis of Transcaucasus, who had previously lacked a temple. The construction of the temple was delayed due to a number of disputes and difficulties, caused by lack of resources and the economic crises during the 1990s as well as the mass emigration from the country, internal disputes within the community on the legitimacy of constructing a Yazidi temple outside historically sacred places like Lalish or Sinjar, and also the close collaboration between the Georgian state and the Orthodox Church of Georgia who opposed construction of buildings for other religions.

The temple was finally opened in 2013 on the outskirts of Tbilisi. Since 2016, another building adjacent to this temple hosts the Yezidi Academy of Theology, which is headed by a cleric, Pîr Dîma, who is the President of the Spiritual Council of Yezidis of Georgia. The academy offers religious classes taught in Kurdish and Russian, as well as including Arabic courses for any Yazidi who wishes to partake. Students are trained for religious roles such as being the guardian (Micêwir) of the temple and clerics for wedding ceremonies.

In 2012, a ritual of "reconversion" to Yazidism, which was proposed by the Academy of Theology, was authorized by the top religious leaders of Yazidis, Mîr Tehsîn Beg and Babê Şêx Xurto during their visit to Tbilisi. This ritual allows Yazidis who converted to Christianity and were thus excommunicated from the community, to return to Yazidism provided they have not been married in the meantime.

The Yazidis in Georgia are among the poorest and most persecuted people in Georgia. In the Soviet Union there was almost no contact between Yazidis in Georgia and Yazidis in Armenia with the Yazidis in Iraq, Turkey and Syria. In 1989 there were 33,000 Yazidis in Georgia. After the collapse of the Soviet Union in the 1990s, thousands of Yazidis fled from Georgia to Germany because of persecution and discrimination. In 2008, the number of Yazidis in Georgia was 12,000.

== Notable people ==
- Isko Daseni
- Aslan Usoyan
- Guram Adzhoyev
- Zakhariy Kalashov
- Lusia Aloeva
- Amirkhan Mori
