= Spiritual Council of the Yazidis in Georgia =

Yazidi Spiritual Council of Georgia
- Civata Rûhaniya Êzdiyan ya Gurcistanê
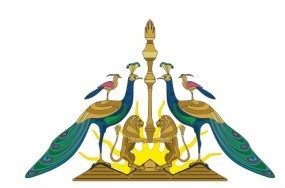
- Formation: 2011
- Type: Religious organization
- Headquarters: Sultan Ezid Temple
- Extiyar: Dimitri Pirbari
- Website: http://www.yezidi.ge/

The Spiritual Council of the Yezidis in Georgia (SCYG) (Georgian: ეზიდთა სასულიერო საბჭო საქართველოში; Kurdish: Civata Rûhanîya Êzdiyan li Gurcistanê) also known as Akhtiarate of Georgia and the Yazidi Territories of Serhed (Kurdish: Extiyargeha Gurcistanê û Êzdîxana Serhedê) is a Yazidi religious organization founded in 2011 and registered as a public law legal entity in Georgia. The council operates at a regional level and is recognized by the Georgian state as well as by the Yezidi spiritual center in Lalish. The Council carries out religious, educational, and cultural activities. Its headquarters is at the Sultan Ezid Temple in Tbilisi. It carries out religious, educational, and cultural activities.

According to its statute and constitution, the Spiritual Council of the Yezidis in Georgia is an independent religious organization. In 2020, YSCG was reorganized into the "Akhtiyarate of Georgia and the Yezidi Territories of Serhed", with Dimitri Pirbari assuming the title of Akhtiyar (Extiyar). This development was carried out with the approval and blessing of the Yazidi spiritual leader, the Extiyarê Mergehê, Baba Sheikh Khato Haji Ismail.

The organization has been led by Sheikh Nadr Aloyan from 2011 to 2014, and by Pir Dima (Dimitri Pirbari) from 2014 to the present.

== Organizational structure ==
Sultan Ezid Temple in Tbilisi & Its Cultural Centre

The organizational structure of the Spiritual Council of the Yezidis of Georgia consists of two tiers. The organization is headed by a spiritual leader, the Extiyar, who also serves as chairman of the Council of Clergy. Administrative and public affairs are managed by the governing board (dîwan), which is chaired by a board chairman.

First tier:

- Members of the Council
- Council of Clergy
- Head of the organization and Council of Clergy (Extiyar)
- Governing board (dîwan) of seven members
- Board chairman
- Temple servant (Micêwir)

Second tier:

- Congregation (parishioners)
- Yezidi Cultural Center
- Yezidi Research Center
- Council of Elders

== Activities ==
Since 2011, the organization has conducted spiritual and educational activities, including courses on language, history, and religion, as well as organizing pilgrimages to Lalish. It publishes books, brochures, and calendars, and holds religious, cultural, and educational events, including daily services and weekly sermons at the temple. Since 2014, with the cooperation of the Georgian authorities, members of the Council annually visit Yezidi prisoners in Georgian prisons during Yezidi holidays.

The council is a member of the Religions Council at the Tolerance Center, operating under the Public Defender of Georgia, and cooperates with the State Agency for Religious Affairs.

In 2011, the Council facilitated a visit to Tbilisi of twelve representatives of the Yezidi clergy and secular leaders from Iraq, led by Mîr Tehsîn Beg and Baba Şêx Xurto Hacî Îsmaîl — described by Rodziewicz as the first visit of significant Yezidi leaders to Georgia in nearly a century.

Following the 2014 genocide of Yazidis in Iraq, the organization has actively worked to inform both the Georgian public and the international community about the situation of Yazidis in Iraq.

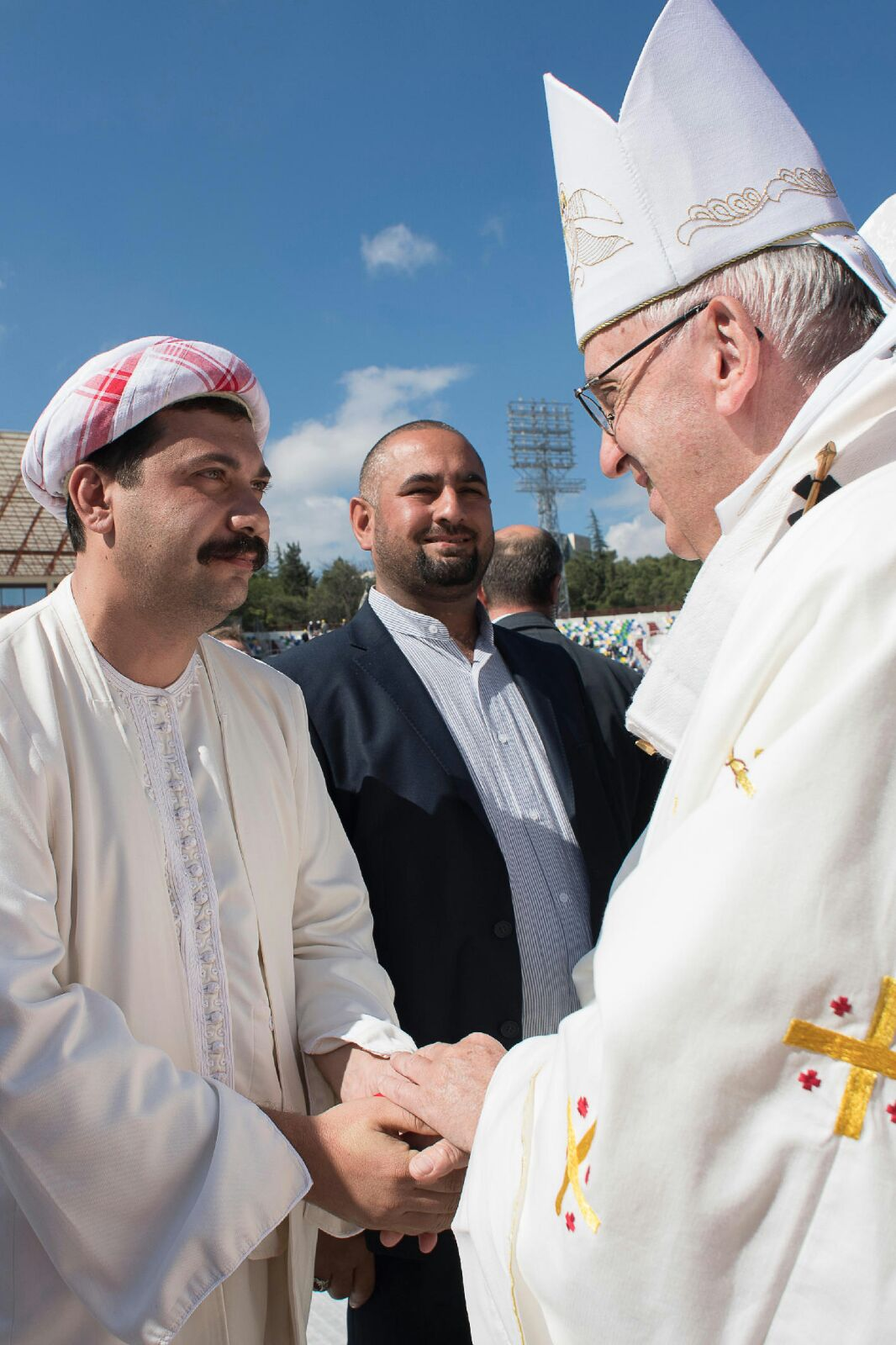
Dimitri Pirbari and Pope Francis

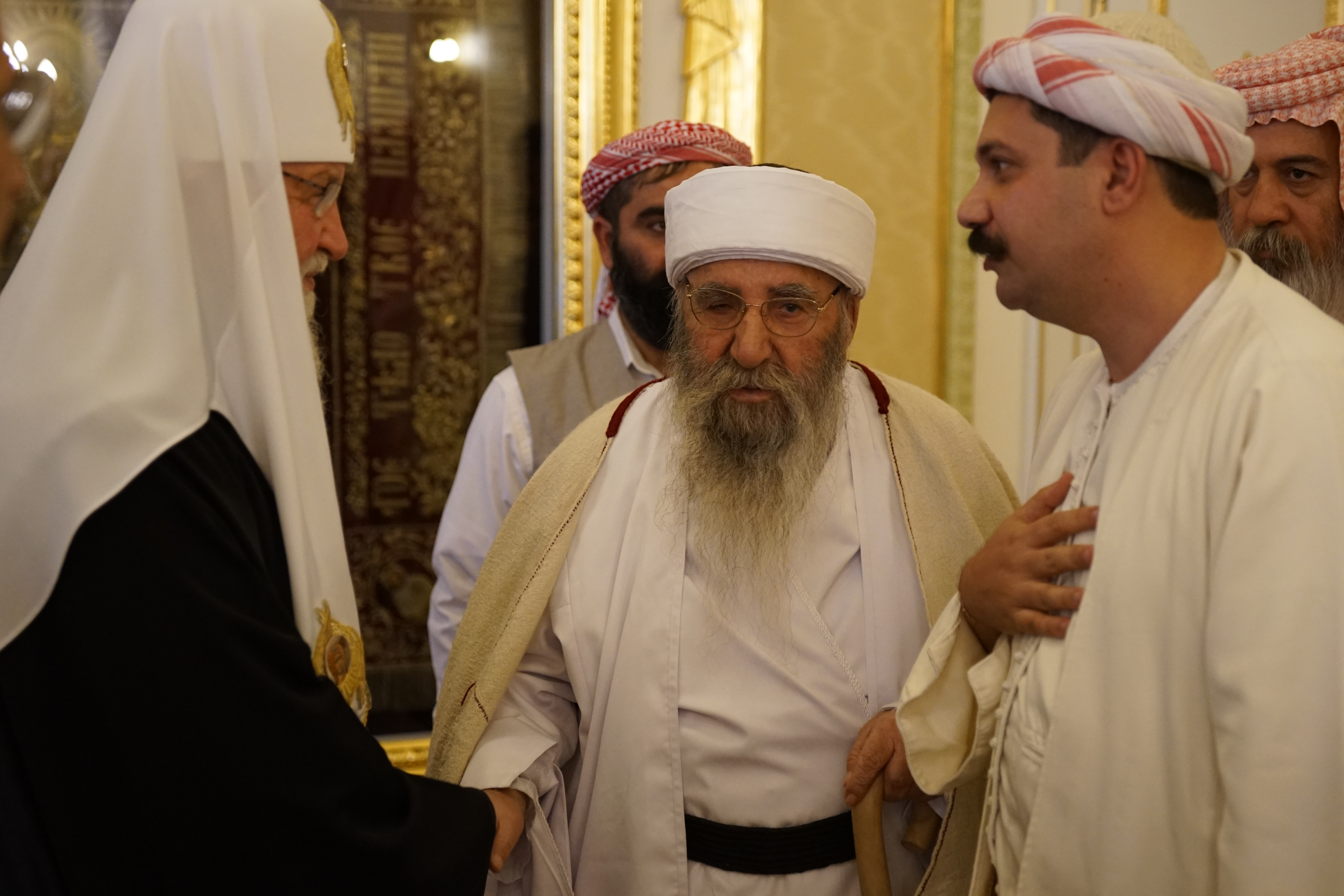
Patriarch of Moscow and Russia Kirill (left), Yazidi Spiritual Leaders Baba Sheikh and Dimitri Pirbari (right)

The council has established relationships with spiritual leaders of various religions, both within Georgia and abroad. It organized meetings between senior Yazidi clergy and Pope Francis, and in 2011 arranged a visit of Yazidi spiritual leaders to Georgia, where a meeting took place with Catholicos-Patriarch of Georgia Ilia II. Under the leadership of Dmitri Pirbari, further meetings were held with: Catholicos-Patriarch Ilia II (2016), Catholicos-Patriarch of Armenian Karekin II (2015), Ecumenical Patriarch Bartholomew (2016), Metropolitan Hilarion of Volokolamsk (2016), and Ayatollah Shahrestani, personal representative of Sistani, during a visit to the Yazidi temple (2016).

In 2018, the Council sent a formal letter to the Yezidi Supreme Spiritual Council (YSSC) in Lalish, signed by eleven members, identifying what it described as the main problems facing Yazidism, including weak institutionalization, lack of religious education, and the YSSC's failure to consult diaspora communities as well as proposing a series of reforms, including the establishment of a Yazidi theological academy and a separation of religion and politics. It also proposed 16 Akhtiyarates, 11 new ones (of Dûban, Lehfa Şemsê Pîra, Hewêrî and Silîvan, Qubletê Şingalê, Şemalê Şingalê, Xalita and Turkey, Aleppo and Syria, the Northern Countries, Europe, North America, and Australia) in addition to five which had already been in use, the Extiyarê Mergehê, Extiyarê Baskî, Extiyarê Be’şîqê, Extiyarê Behzanê, and Extiyarê Beravê. The supreme Extiyar being the Extiyarê Mergehê, with "Mergeh" referring to the region encompassing Lalish.

On 19 October 2018, the Council organized a visit by a delegation of the Supreme Spiritual Council of Yezidis to Moscow, where they met with Patriarch Kirill of Moscow. According to the organization, this was the first such meeting between the supreme Yazidi clergy and the head of the Russian Orthodox Church in 200 years of Russo-Yazidi relations.

According to the European scholar Arthur Rodziewicz, the most significant figure of the Yazidi diaspora in the Caucasus is the head of the Spiritual Council of the Yezidis in Georgia, Dimitri Pirbari, also known as Pîr Dîma, stating:

"From a young age he has enjoyed great authority: conducting religious ceremonies including holidays, sermons, weddings and funerals; organizing educational and community events; and maintaining strong ties with the Yazidi clergy of Iraq, Georgian authorities, and the Church. Thanks to his efforts, Yazidis hold an increasingly strong position in Georgia. Their holidays are recognized in state-issued calendars, and memorial plaques dedicated to prominent figures from the community have been installed in Tbilisi."

The activities of the Council have been noted to be leading to the revival of the Yazidi religion in Georgia. According to researcher Majid Hassan of the University of Bamberg, who conducted a study on the Yazidis in Georgia, the Council represents "a revolutionary project in the revival of the Yazidi religion".

In 2017, the council established the Amakdar award, presented to individuals contributing to the preservation and development of Yazidism. In the same year, the Council submitted a petition to the Georgian authorities requesting a plot of land at the Lotkini municipal Yezidi cemetery in Tbilisi for the construction of an additional Yazidi shrine.

== Criticism ==
The establishment of the Council led to the institutionalization of the Yazidi religion in Georgia, which was not welcomed by all Yazidi sheikhs and pirs in Georgia. Previously, they had been able to interpret various postulates of Yazidism at their own discretion without constraint. Over time, these sheikhs and pirs began to oppose the council and actively criticize its activities, seeking to return to the state of affairs that existed prior to the organization's registration. The council has also faced criticism from certain Yazidis with political affiliations with Kurdish political parties for refusing to implement their political agendas among the Yezidi population in Georgia and for maintaining independence from Kurdish political organizations.
