= Supreme Yazidi Spiritual Council =

The Supreme Yazidi Spiritual Council or the Council of Wise Men (also called Civata Ruhanî or Meclisa Ruhanî) is a council made up of Yazidi dignitaries that deals with the religious and secular affairs of the Yazidis.

== Role ==
The Supreme Yazidi Spiritual Council, headquartered at Lalish, is described in its own correspondence as "the highest religious authority of the Yazidi religion in the world”, with authority extending to Yazidis in Iraq and the diaspora. The Mîr, as leader of the Council, acts as "the head of the Yezidians throughout the world," combining religious and political authority, with his rights historically acknowledged even by the Ottoman Sultan and later given official recognition by the Iraqi state. The Mîr's duties include leadership and worldwide representation of the Yazidis, renovating and building holy sites at Lalish (funded from Lalish/Tawis revenues), assisting poor and needy Yazidis, and resolving disputes and problems (including intertribal disputes).

The two top offices maintain a reciprocal relationship: the Mîr confirms and appoints the Extiyarê Mergehê (the Baba Sheikh in his capacity as head of the clergy); in turn, the Extiyarê Mergehê blesses a crown prince to be the new Mîr.

The Council has no adopted constitution. A 2018 letter from the YSCG—addressed to the Council, Mîr Tehsîn Beg, and the Baba Sheikh—described the Council as lacking internal regulations, a defined division of duties among its members, and mechanisms for consulting Yazidi religious scholars outside Iraq. The letter proposed a twelve-point reform programme, including reorganisation, term limits on political involvement, and regular annual sessions. The Council did not formally respond to this letter.

In 2019, the YSCG submitted a draft Constitution of the World Yezidi Community that would have formally defined the Council's composition, powers, and procedures. Council representatives verbally committed in April 2019 to review the draft, but no formal response followed. This, combined with leadership disputes following the deaths of Mîr Tehsîn Beg (2019) and Baba Sheikh Khurto Hajji Ismail (2020), led the YSCG to declare unilateral autonomy while continuing to recognise the Lalish council as "first among the Yezidi Councils, but not the superior one."

== Meetings ==
The meetings are traditionally held in Lalish. All Yazidi leading clerics from Sheikhan, some Yazidi tribal leaders and some Yazidi village elders also occasionally attend the meetings.
