= Cejna Cemayê =

Yazidi festival

- Also called: Cemaya Şîxadî, Îda Cemayê
- Observed by: Yazidis
- Type: Religious
- Begins: 6 October
- Ends: 13 October
- Duration: 6 days
- Frequency: Annual

The Cejna Cemayê (lit. 'Feast of the Assembly' or 'Feast of the Gathering') is a Yazidi festival that takes place annually from 6 October to 13 October, in honor of the Sheikh Adi. It is an important time for cohesion and includes an annual pilgrimage to the tomb of Sheikh Adi (Şêx Adî) in Lalish, along with many important ceremonies throughout the festive days.

If possible, Yazidis make at least one pilgrimage to Lalish during their lifetime, and those living in the region try to attend at least once a year for the Feast of the Assembly in autumn.

== Description ==
During the festival, the whole community which includes tribal chiefs, religious dignitaries and authorities join together in one place and special performances, celebrations and rituals are performed. This includes processions, communal meals, theatrical performances, recitals of qewls, animal sacrifices and candle lighting, this festival is also celebrated joyously with dances, musical performances, markets, and games.

During the first three days of the festival, general rituals are performed, such as 'morkirin' ('Baptising', 'Spiritual Washing') at the spring of Kaniya Spî, and the 'selakirin' ('Holy Greeting') at the spring of Zimzim in Lalish which pilgrims must perform as part of the pilgrimage. Pilgrims begin selakirin ritual by washing their hands and faces, sprinkling the water of Zimzim while praying to obtain fulfilment of all hopes by recalling all the names of relatives, friends and anyone who has requested to have their name mentioned for Selakirin. During these first three days, thousands of pilgrims also arrive at the Bridge of Silat, which symbolizes the crossing from the profane life into the sacred life. Everyone is required to remove their shoes, wash their hands in the river, and cross the bridge three times while carrying torches and singing hymns. Thereafter, they walk to Sheikh 'Adī's tomb. They circumambulate three times around the building before kissing the doorframe and entering. They take their places around a five-branched torch and watch the first evening dance. The evening dance, called Sema Êvarî, is performed on every evening of the festival. During the dance, twelve men, dressed in white, circumambulate around a sacred torch lit in the middle which represents both God and the sun. The twelve men sing hymns as they pace slowly and solemnly. They are accompanied by the music of three Qawwals, who are trained singers and reciters of religious hymns. Pilgrims also visit the sacred white stone located on top of the Arafat mountain next to the sanctuary, which is one of the three mountains next in the Lalish valley surrounding the temple. They walk around the white stone seven times, kiss it to show reverence and offer a sum of money to the guardian of the site.

=== Day 4: Perî Siwarkirin (Inaugurating Perîs) ===
On the fourth day of the festival (10 October), the ritual of baptising and inaugurating Perîs is performed. Perî refers to pieces of colourful fabric; 2-3 meters in length each; that are tied on tombs of Yazidi saints inside their shrines in Lalish and called Periyên Sindrukên Xasa ('Perîs of the graves of saints'). There are a total of seven of these Perîs in Lalish and they are as follows:

1. Perîya Êzî
2. Perîya Şêşims
3. Perîya Şêx Fexir
4. Perîya Sitiya Ês
5. Perîya Şêx Adî
6. Perîya Şêx Hesen
7. Perîya Şêxûbekir

During this ritual, the old Perîs are changed with the new ones which are baptised with the water of Kaniya Spî spring for blessing. It is believed that the colours of Perîs represent the colours of nature.

=== Day 5: Qebaxgêran (sacrificial bull) ritual ===
On the fifth day (11 October) of Cejna Cemayê, the ritual of Qebax is performed, during which a bull is ritually sacrificed at the shrine of Şêşims, who is the Angel of the sun and member of the Heptad. During Qebaxgêran, Three tribes, namely Qayidî, Tirik, and Mamûsî exclusively with Qewals, the holder of the Çeqeltu (a candelabrum with seven lights) and the holder of the incense attend a Celse (session) in Lalish, during which pilgrims perform a popular dance while the music of Def and Şibab (flute and tambourine) is being performed. Meanwhile, the bull is transferred from its place called Gayî Koj to the shrine of Şêşims, where it is slaughtered. Its meat is then to be cooked and distributed among pilgrims along with boiled wheat as Simat (religious food). At the end of the ritual, the participants put a small branch of a tree on their turbans. It is believed that eating Simat and carrying a small branch of a tree on the turbans by those attending symbolizes the coming of greenness of the earth and germination of wheat in spring as a result of ceremonial bull sacrifice.

=== Day 6: Berê Şibakê (Throne of Netting) ===
On the 6th day (12 October), the ritual of Berê Şibakê is performed. Berê Şibakê, also called Textê Êzîd (The throne of Êzîd), is a grid of copper about a meter square with 81 copper rings that are adjoined with one another on a special carpet, which is supported on its sides with two timbers, forming a triangle with four handles in the same size. Berê Şibakê is brought from Bahzani, where it is kept in a special case, to Lalish on this day for this ceremony, which is attended by the Mîr, Babê Şêx and his entourage, the holders of the Çeqeltu and the incense as well as the Qewals who recite Qewlê Texta (Hymn of the Thrones). This sacred object is then carried by the attendants on their shoulders from inside of Sheikh Adi's shrine to the sacred pond of Kewtel/Kelokê, where it is baptized with the water of the pond for blessing before being returned to its place inside the shrine.

=== Day 7 ===
On the seventh and final day, other general ceremonies similar to the rites of pilgrimage during ordinary times are performed. The religious dance, Govenda Derê Kaniya Spî ('The dance in front of the Kaniya Spi') is performed by pilgrims in front of the sacred White Spring. Pilgrims also bring some of the water of Kaniya Spî and Zimzim home for blessing at the end of the festival.

== Origins ==
This festival corresponds to the ancient Iranian feast of Mehragan, which also typically involved animal sacrifice. The ceremonial bull sacrifice in particular has been shown to be similar with the ancient Iranian tradition, as the bull sacrifice takes place in front of Sheikh Shems, a solar being that shares a lot of similar traits with the Ancient Iranian solar deity Mithra, who is repeatedly depicted slaying a bull and who also had a festival, during the same season, celebrated in his honour. In a thorough article, the Yezidi Studies scholar Artur Rodziewicz has tried to demonstrate that the assertion, which has been reiterated in the scholarly literature for several decades, that the Yezidi festival is linked to Mithraism is an unsupported over-interpretation that is also politically motivated.
