= Sitiya Zin =

Yazidi female saint

Sitîya Zin
- Zîn
- Era: Late Abbasid era
- Spouse: Ezdina Mir
- Children: Two of the four Shemsani Skeikhs: Sheikh Shems, Fakhraddin
- Father: Sheikh Adi ibn Musafir

Sitiya Zin (Kurdish: Sitîya Zîn). The Kurdish term "Sit (î) “ is used as an honorary title and means approximately "lady “ or "noble woman “. Zîn is a Kurdish woman's name. Sitîya Zîn means "the noble lady Zin “. Sitiya Zin is a very important female saint of the Yazidis.

As is often the case with saints of the Yazidis, there are little written traditions about them. She lived in the 12th Century and was the daughter of Sheikh Adi a very important saint to Yazidi people. Sitiya Zin was also the wife of the important Yazidi saint, Ezdina Mir, who was a prince of the Yazidis before Sheikh Adi's arrival. His second wife was Sitiya Ereb. These three people are the parents of the four Shemsani-Sheikhs and the ancestors of the Shemsani-Sheikh lineages. Sitiya Zin was the mother of two of the Shemsani-Sheikhs, Sheikh Fexredin (Kurdish: Sheikh Fekhredin / Şêx Fexredîn), one of the most famous saints, and Sheikh Shems (Kurdish: Sheikh Shemsedin / Şêx Şemsedîn).

== Memorial in Lalish in honour of Sitiya Zin ==
In the sanctuary of Lalish, a "Qendîl" or "Çira" (Lights in honour of saints) is dedicated to Sitiya Zin, which is lit at a certain place in the sanctuary.
