= Wansa =

Yazidi princess

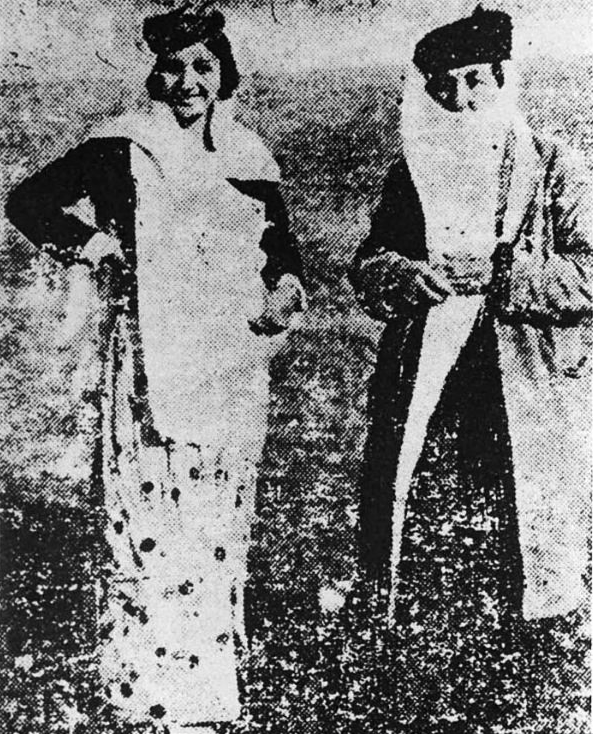
Mira Wansa and Meyan Khatun around 1935

Mira Khatun Wansa, Wansa Ismail el-Amawy or simply Wansa (1917 — June 25, 2015) was a Yazidi princess. In 1934–1938 she was the wife of Mir Sa'id Beg. Wansa was born in Tikrit and was a daughter of Ismail Beg. Her brothers were Mua'wia, Abd el-Karim and Yezid Khan.

== Biography ==
In 1929, she entered American School for Girls in Beirut. In 1934, she became the fifth wife of Sa'id Beg, son of Ali Beg and Meyan Khatun in the Stone Palace in Ba'adra. Wansa gave birth to a daughter Leyla who died after one year. In 1938, Said Beg attended a meeting where Wansa's brother Yezid Khan was accused of conspiracy and marked for death. When Said Beg informed Wansa, she pulled out a revolver from beneath her pillow and said "He will hear that you have died first!". She fired multiple times, wounding her husband. In the confusion Wansa's Armenian chauffeur Hagop assisted her to escape to Mosul and then to Baghdad, where a hiding place was found for her by Hagop's family, whom Wansa's father Ismail had rescued years before. She then moved to Aleppo.

When The Second World War started, Rashid Ali al-Gaylani, who was a friend of Ismail, allowed Wansa to return to Baghdad and live under official protection. In 1947, Wansa converted to Islam and married a Syrian doctor. Wansa died in Cairo on 21 June 2015 in Cairo, Egypt.
