= Khalil Rashow =

Khalil Rashow or Xelîl Cindî Reşo (born 1952) is a contemporary Kurdish academic, writer and researcher.

He was born in the village of Mam Rasha in district of Sheikhan in Mosul province in northern Iraq. From 1970 to 1974 he studied at the department of Kurdish language and literature of University of Baghdad.

He moved to Czechoslovakia in 1986 and received his PhD from the Oriental Institute of Charles University in Prague in 1991. From 1985 to 1991 he was the head of Society of Kurdish Students in Europe (KSSE).

He has been teaching Kurdish language at the University of Göttingen since 1996. From 1999 to 2005 he has conducted research in cooperation with Professor Philip G. Kreyenbroek on Yazidi religious beliefs. He is considered as an expert on Yazidi folklore.

From 2013 to 2015, he served as Ambassador of the Republic of Iraq to Vietnam.

== Books ==
1. Êzidiyatî: li ber roşnaya hindek têkistêt ayinê Êzidiyan (Yazidism: In Light of Some Yazidi Religious Texts), Korî Zanyarî Kurd, Baghdad 1979. (in Kurdish, co-authored with Xidir Silêman).
2. Kurdish national liberation movements in southern Kurdistan 1939-1968, APEC Publishers, Stockholm, 1994. (in Arabic)
3. Du´a û dirozêt Êzidiyan (Prayers of the Yazidis), in two parts, Einbeck Publishers, Germany, 1997. (in Kurdish)
4. God and Sheikh Adi are Perfect: Sacred Poems and Religious Narratives from the Yezidi Tradition, Berlin, Iranica 9. (co-authored with Philip G. Kreyenbroek) (in English)
5. Nehwa me´rifat haqîqet al-diyana al-êzidiya, Rabun Publishers, Sweden, 1998.(in Arabic)
6. Perin ji Edebê Dînê Êzidiyan (Pages from religious literature of Yazidis), in two volumes, Spîrêz Publishers, Duhok, 2004. (in Kurdish)

== See also ==
- List of Kurdish scholars
