= Lusia Aloeva =

Georgian Yazidi biologist and botanist

- ლუსია ალოევა
- Born: October 28, 1928; Tbilisi
- Died: February 18, 2011 (aged 82)
- Education: Tbilisi State University
- Occupations: Biologist, lecturer
- Known for: First Yezidi woman to attend university and to earn a doctoral degree
- Awards: Order of Honor (2003)
- Scientific career
- Fields: Biology
- Workplaces: Tbilisi State University; Pushkin Tbilisi State Pedagogical Institute

Lusia Mamedovna Aloeva (Georgian: ლუსია ალოევა; Russian: Люся Мамедовна Алоева; Kurmanji Kurdish: Lûsîya Aloyêva; 28 October 1928 – 18 February 2011) was a Georgian-Yezidi botanist and biologist. A member of Tbilisi's Yezidi community, she is considered to have been the first female Yezidi scientist. She taught botany for decades at Tbilisi State University, where she became the first Yezidi student and the first Yezidi woman to defend a doctoral dissertation in 1967. She was awarded Georgia's Order of Honor in 2003.

== Early life and education ==
Aloeva was born in Tbilisi on 28 October 1928 to a working-class family, and belonged to the priestly caste of Pîrs. In 1937, she was accepted to Tbilisi Russian Secondary School No. 100, and from 1942 she studied at Secondary School No. 25, from which she graduated in 1948. That same year, she entered the Biology Faculty of Tbilisi State University (TSU), becoming the first Yezidi student there.

== Career ==
Aloeva graduated from the Faculty of Biology at Tbilisi State University in 1953 and worked there as a laboratory assistant. From 1954 to 1956 she attended the evening division of the University of Marxism–Leninism. In 1959 she entered extramural postgraduate study, which she completed in 1963. In 1967 she defended a doctoral dissertation for the degree of Candidate of Biological Sciences and became a doctor of biological sciences, becoming the first Yezidi woman to hold the degree. From 1968 to 1983 she lectured at the Pushkin Tbilisi State Pedagogical Institute. Over time, she received the title of Professor and worked as an active researcher at the University from 1971 to 2011.

She was the author of 32 scientific works. In 2003 she compiled a nine-page teaching text on the phylogeny of flowering plants for botany students, published by Tbilisi State University Press and edited by Revaz Gagnidze. In 2006, she was awarded a PhD in biological sciences. She was the first Yezidi woman to attend university and the first to earn a Candidate of Sciences degree.

== Recognition ==
In 2003 Aloeva received the Order of Honor and the Ivane Javakhishvili medal, and she held the title of Veteran of Labour.

== See also ==
- List of Yazidi people
