= Meyan Khatun =

Yazidi princess and regent of the Emirate of Sheikhan

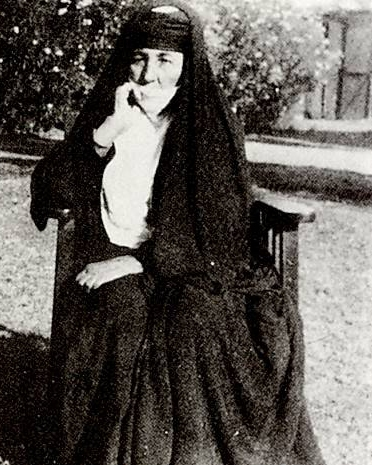
Mira Meyan Khatun in 1945

Mira Meyan Khatun or Mayan Khatun (Kurdish: Meyan Xatûn; born. 1874/1873, Ba'adra, Ottoman Empire - died 1957/1958, Sinjar, Kingdom of Iraq) — Yazidi princess, a regent of Yazidi principality of Sheikhan in 1913-1957.

== Life ==
Mayan was a daughter of the well known Yazidi prince Abdi Beg. She was the wife of Mir Ali Beg, sister of Mir Ismail Chol Beg, mother of Mir Sa'id Beg and a grandmother of Mir Tahsin Beg. She is said to have been an extraordinary personality and respected as the legal guardian of her son and later also of her grandson Tahsin Beg.

In an event known as the Year of the General in the year 1892, the Ottoman general Omar Wehbi Pasha waged a military campaign against the Yazidis and she and her husband, Mîr Ali Beg were sent to exile from which they only with difficulties could arrange their return.

Meyan Khatun's grandson, Prince Tahsin Said, held the symbolic position of Prince of the Yazidis (Mîr) until his death in January 2019. He was succeeded by his son, Prince Hazim Tahsin Beg, in July of the same year.
