= Eszter Spät =

Hungarian researcher, expert on Yezidi religion

Eszter Spät is a Hungarian academic and journalist, who specializes in Yezidi religion and in its relationship with the Kurdish independence movement. She directed the documentary Following the Peacock, which explored the lives of a Yezidi community in Sinjar in northern Iraq.

== Education ==
In 1996 Spät was awarded a MA degree in Classical Philology from Eötvös University, Budapest, presenting a thesis entitled: “Priscillian – Monk, Heretic, Martyr, Astrologer". In 1999 she was awarded a second MA degree in English Language and Literature at the same university, with a thesis entitled: "The Pelagian Movement in the British Isles”. In 1999 she also earned a MA degree in Medieval Studies at the Central European University, Budapest, with a thesis entitled: "Manichaeism in the anti-Manichaean Literature: The Figure of Mani in the Acta Archelai". In 2009 she was awarded her PhD in Medieval Studies from the Central European University, Budapest, defending a thesis entitled: "Late Antique Motifs in Yezidi Oral Tradition".

From 2011 to 2016 Spät was funded by a postdoctoral research grant from the Hungarian Scientific and Research Fund (OTKA). From 2011 to 2012 she obtained a research grant from the Gerda Henkel Foundation for research in Iraq and Germany. From 2014 to 2015 she was appointed as a visiting research fellow at Ruhr-University Bochum. In 2016 she was a visiting research fellow at Zentrum Moderner Orient, Berlin. She has published on Gnosticism and Manichaeism. She has also worked as a war correspondent.

== Yezidi scholarship ==
Following the Peacock - A Documentary by Eszter Spät

Spät specializes in Yezidi religion and in its relationship with the Kurdish movement. Her work demonstrated that there had been a resurgence in Yezidi religious practices in a "post-ISIS" political climate. She has also recorded Yezidi histories and beliefs around fermans (similar to pogroms). her work has also recorded Yezidi responses to the story of Shahid bin Jarr. As a result of her research in Iraq in 2011 and 2012, Spät also made the anthropological documentary, Following the Peacock. This documentary followed a local group from northern Iraq, the Yezidi Sinjar community, and to show their traditions.

== Bibliography ==
=== Books ===
- Eszter Spät, Late Antique Motifs in Yezidi Oral Tradition, Gorgias Press: (NJ) Piscataway, 2010.
- Ezster Spät, The Yezidis, SAQI Books: London, 2005.

=== Articles and book chapters ===
- Ezster Spät, “Yezidi Oral Tradition: A Yezidi Myth as told by Feqir Haji.” (Hung.) In Irodalmi Szemle 58.12, 2015, 5-14.
- Ezster Spät, “’Falling into Book.’ Yezidi Seers in Modern Iraq.“ (Hung.) In Spiritual Mediators (Hung.: Spirituális Közvetítők). Karoli Books Series. Ed. M. Vassányi, E. Sepsi, V. Voigt. Budapest: L’Harmattan, 2014.
- Ezster Spät, "The Peacock Sanjak, Yezidi Oral Tradition and Identity.” (Hung.) In Axis: Journal of Religious History 5, 2014, 1-17.
- Ezster Spät, “On Soil and Jinn: Ritual Practices and Syncretism among the Yezidis of Iraq.” In Rituale als Ausdruck von Kulturkontakt: „Synkretismus” zwischen Negation und Neudefinition. Studies in Oriental Religions 67. Ed. A. Pries, L. Martzolff, R. Langer and C. Ambos, 111-130. Wiesbaden: Harrassowitz, 2013.
- Ezster Spät, “Religion and Oral History: The Origin Myth of the Yezidis.” In Remembering the Past in Iranian Societies. Ed. C. Allison and P. Kreyenbroek. Göttinger Orientforschungen IRANICA Neue Folge 9. Harrassowitz.
- Ezster Spät, “A Gnostic Myth in the Modern Middle East: The Yezidi „Son of a Jar” and Seth.” (Hung.) Ókor 10.2, 2011, 14-24.
- Ezster Spät, “In Lieu of Prayer: Yezidi Shrines in Northern Iraq.” (Hung.) In Áldozat és Ima (Sacrifice and Prayer.) Ed. K. B. Hoppál, Zs. Szilágyi, M. Vassányi, 154-169. Vallástudományi Könyvtár V. Budapest: L’Harmattan, 2011.
- Ezster Spät, "The Song of the Commoner: The Gnostic Call in Yezidi Oral Tradition.” In In Search of Truth: Augustine, Manichaeism and Other Gnosticism. Ed. J. A. van den Berg and J. van Schaik, 663-683. Leiden: Brill, 2011.
- Ezster Spät, “The Role of the Peacock “Sanjak” in Yezidi Religious Memory.” In Materializing Memory: Archeological Material Culture and the Semantics of the Past. BAR International Series 1977. Ed. A. Choyke-J. Rasson-I. Barbiera, 105-116. Oxford: Archeopress, 2009.
- Ezster Spät, "Religious Oral Tradition and Literacy Among the Yezidis of Iraq.” Anthropos 103.2, 2008, 393-404.
- Ezster Spät, “Late Antique Literary Motifs in Yezidi Oral Tradition: The Yezidi Myth of Adam.” Journal of American Oriental Society 128.4, 2008, 663-79.
- Ezster Spät, “The ‘Teachers’ of Mani in the Acta Archelai and Simon Magus.” Vigiliae Christianae 58.1, 2004, 1-23.
- Ezster Spät, “Changes in the Oral Tradition of the Yezidis of Iraqi Kurdistan.” The Journal of Kurdish Studies 5, 2004, 73-83.
- Ezster Spät, “The Festival of Sheikh Adi in Lalish, in the Holy Valley of the Yezidis.” Annual of Medieval Studies at CEU (Central European University, Budapest) 10, 2004, 147-57.
- Ezster Spät, “Shehid bin Jerr, Forefather of the Yezidis and the Gnostic Seed of Seth.” Iran and the Caucasus 6, no. 1-2, 2002, 27-56.
- Ezster Spät, “Some Topoi in the Description of Heretics in Early Christian Literature: Simon Magus, pater omnium haereticorum.” (Hung.) In Studia Patrum. Eds. P. Nemeshegyi – Z. Rihmer, 71-82. Budapest: Szent István Publishing House, 2002.
- Ezster Spät, “The Commonitorium of Orosius on the Teachings of the Priscillianists.” Acta Antiqua Hungarica 38, 1998, 357-379.
- Ezster Spät, “The Teachings of Priscillian in the Writings of the Church Fathers.” (Hung.) Antik Tanulmányok – Studia Antiqua 42, 1998, 137-152.
- Ezster Spät, “The Literary Image of a Heretic Bishop in the 5th Century.” (Hung.) Ókortudományi Értestő 1.1, 1997, 21-27.
