= Hazim Tahsin Beg =

- Mirê Şêxan

Mîr of Sheikhan
- Reign: 27 July 2019 - present
- Predecessor: Mîr Tehsîn Beg
- Born: 1 May 1963 (age 63); Baadre, Iraqi Republic (present-day Baadre, Kurdistan Region)
- Spouse: Mayan Khairi Saeed
- Lineage: Qatanî

Hazim Tahsin Beg (born 1 May 1963) is the current Mîr (Prince) of the Sheikhan principality and has led the Yazidis since 2019. Mîr Hazim is the son and successor of Mîr Tehsîn Beg, who died at the age of 85 after leading the Yazidis for 75 years. Mîr Hazim has previously won a seat in the Kurdistan Regional Parliament, running as a Kurdistan Democratic Party candidate in 2009. He is married to Mayan Khairi Saeed, has two sons and a daughter. He holds a bachelor's degree in agriculture at the University of Baghdad.

== Controversy on the Mîr position ==
The choosing of Mîr Hazim by the Spiritual Council in Lalish led to a lot of criticism by some Yezidis; he was accused of having been chosen by KDP authorities to lead Yezidis and not by the Yezidi community itself. In addition, his mother is not of princely family background, thus leading many to believe that he is not a legitimate successor. As a result, some Yezidi notables, tribal leaders and factions with opposing affiliations, namely the PKK-affiliated YBŞ, recognized Naif Bin Dawud as the new Mîr in Sinjar. However, YBŞ commanders denied that he was affiliated with PKK, instead, claiming that he was neutral.
