= Tawûsgêran =

Yazidi festival

- Observed by: Yazidis
- Type: Religious

The Tawûsgêran is a Yazidi religious festival.

== Etymology and timing ==
Tawûsgêran is a compound word combining Tawûs (sacred peacock associated with Tawûsî Melek) and gêran ("wandering"), meaning "the wandering of Tawus". The festival is performed twice a year, in spring and in autumn.

== Description ==
During the Tawûsgêran, Qewals and other religious dignitaries visit Yazidi villages, bringing the sinjaq, sacred images of a peacock symbolizing Tawûsê Melek. These are venerated, fees are collected from the pious, sermons are preached and holy water and berat (small stones from Lalish) distributed.

== History and regional sinjaqs ==
The tradition dates back to before Sheikh Adi's era in the 12th century, with some researchers (like Taufiq Wahby) linking the form of the sinjaq to the Mithraic standard of Hatra.

From the 14th century onward, Yazidis developed their own religious and political institutions in the regions where they lived. The Yezidi territory was divided into seven administrative centres, each having its own Sincaq (banner, flag, province, region), more commonly known as Tawis among the Yezidis. Sincaqs are sacred bronze effigies bearing the image of a bird or peacock to symbolize Tawûsî Melek. They serve as symbols of power for each administrative centre, namely:

1. Tawisa Enzel: Welatşêx (Şêxan) – Lalish
2. Tawisa Şingalê: Shingal District
3. Tawisa Hekkarê: sometimes also called Tawisa Zozana: Historical region of Hakkari (Hakkari, Şırnak, Van and Duhok).
4. Tawisa Welatê Xalta: Region around Siirt, Batman, Diyarbakir, Mardin, etc.
5. Tawisa Helebê: Aleppo and Afrin.
6. Tawisa Tewrêzê: the city of Tabriz, located in today's Iran (Yazidis lived in the western hinterland in the Khoy region).
7. Tawisa Misqofa (Moscow): Renamed from Tawisa Serhedê after the exodus of the Yazidis from Serhed to the Russian Empire. Serhed is a region covering the cities of Kars, Ardahan, Erzurum, Ağri, Van, Bitlis and Muş.

Every six months, the Yezidi Qewals, who are trained reciters of Qewls and other forms of sacred oral Yezidi tradition, were sent out to other Yezidi-inhabited areas with military protection from the central administrative region of Shekhan and the spiritual centre of Lalish. This tradition served to preserve the Yazidi faith and doctrine. The Qewals, supported by voluntary alms, led a Sincaq through Yazidi villages to maintain spiritual legitimacy and symbolize the authority of Lalish and the Mîr.

== Ritual practices ==
- Tawus Ciwankirin (Baptising the Sinjaq): Before the tours, the Sinjaq is brought to Lalish to be baptised with the water of Kaniya Sipî (White Spring).
- Şerbik (Jar of Water): Qewals fill a ritual jar with Kaniya Sipî water to distribute as holy water to young single boys for good marriage fortunes, which also serves as a substitute baptismal water for children who cannot travel to Lalish.
- Çirayên Me'rîfetê (Lamps of Knowledge): Seven lamps are lit beside the Sinjaq on the eve of Tawûsgêran while people gather around them.
