= Khanna Omarkhali =

Kurdish religious scholar

- Xana Omerxalî
- Born: March 15, 1981 (age 45); Armenian SSR
- Other name: Khanna Usoyan

Academic background
- Education: Saint Petersburg State University

Academic work
- Institutions: University of Göttingen
- Main interests: Yazidis and Yazidism

Khanna Omarkhali, also known as Khanna Usoyan (Kurdish: Xana Omerxalî; Russian: Ханна Рзаевна Омархали, also Ханна Рзаевна Усоян; born 15 March 1981, Armenian SSR), is a Kurdish religion researcher.

== Biography ==
She studied Iranian philology at the Saint Petersburg State University, from where she obtained a Ph.D. in 2006, as well as a BSc in 2002 and a MSc in 2004. In 2005, she joined the University of Göttingen as an Academic Assistant in the DFG project “Cultural memory of the Yezidi community in Germany with regard to religious questions", from 2007 to 2010 she was a bursar of the DFG Graduiertenkolleg 896/2 “Götterbilder - Gottesbilder - Weltbilder”, with the project “Yezidi Religious Texts: Their Theological Implications with some References to the Ahl-e Haqq Religious Tradition”. Between 2010 and 2017 she was a researcher in the Institute of Iranian Studies in Göttingen and responsible for Kurdish Studies program. From 2012 to 2017, she was also responsible for setting up of the Iranian and Kurdish Digital Audio Archive at the same Institute. She is considered as an expert in Yezidism and currently works as a scholar at the University of Göttingen. One of her main works is Yazidism - from the Depths of Millennia.

Khanna's main research covers religious minorities in Kurdistan, religion, orality and scripturalization in the Middle East, Yezidism (history, rituals, modern transformations), theological implications of the textual tradition of Yezidis, religious and spiritual authorities in transition, qualitative research in Religious studies and Kurdish dialectology, literature and culture.

Khanna Omarkhali belongs to the Yezidi priestly caste of Pîrs and both her grandfathers are well-known "ulmdars" (i.e. experts in religious knowledge).

== Selected works (English titles) ==
- Omarkhali Kh. On the Structure of the Yezidi Clan and Tribal System and its Terminology among the Yezidis of the Caucasus // Journal of Kurdish Studies. — 2008. — Vol.6. — p. 104-119. ISSN 1370-7205
- Some Reflections on Concepts of Time in Yezidism, 2009 (co-author)
- Kurdish Reader. Modern Literature and Oral Texts in Kurmanji: With Kurdish-English Glossaries and Grammatical Sketch Harrassowitz, 2011 - Foreign Language Study - 282 pages.
- Religious Minorities in Kurdistan: Beyond the Mainstream - Volume 68 of Studies in Oriental Religions, ISSN 0340-6792, 2014.
- "The Yezidi Religious Textual Tradition: From Oral to Written. Wiesbaden, Harrassowitz. ISBN 9783447108560. 2017.

== See also ==
- Philip G. Kreyenbroek, Iranian and Yazidi studies scholar at the University of Göttingen
