= Amadin =

Yazidi saint

Sheikh Amadin
- Amadîn
- Other name: ‘Emad ad-Dīn
- Known for: Patron saint of stomach pains
- Father: Sheikh Shems
- Family: Shemsani lineage

Amadin or ‘Emad ad-Dīn (Kurdish: Amadîn) was a 13th-century Yazidi holy figure who, according to Yazidi tradition, founded the Bahdinan emirate.

== Family & Religious Role ==
Amadin was one of the nine sons of Sheikh Shems and progenitors of one of the Yazidi Sheikh sublineages. Sheikhs from his lineage live in Iraq and Armenia, and the religious title of Babê Gavan is given to this lineage. He is associated with healing stomach pains. In addition, members of the Amadîn lineage (the Sheikhs of Amadîn) are strictly forbidden from eating rooster.
