= Sultan Ezid Temple =

Yazidi temple in Tbilisi, Georgia

- სულთან ეზიდის ტაძარი
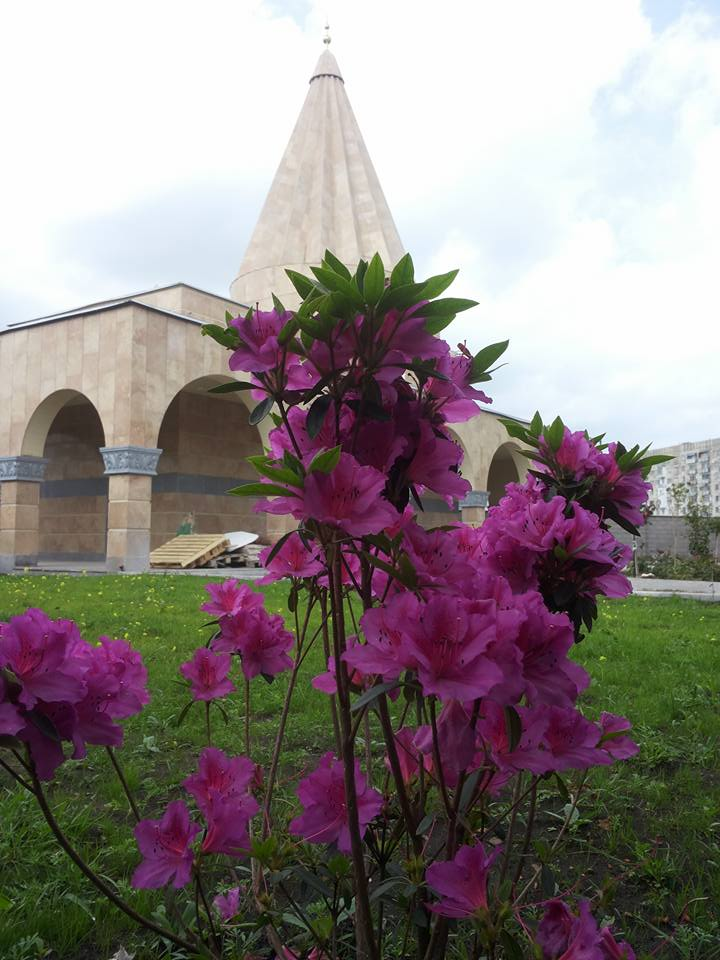
- Sultan Ezid temple

- Location within Tbilisi

Religion
- Affiliation: Yazidism
- Year consecrated: 2015

Location
- Location: Tbilisi, Georgia
- Coordinates: 41°42′35″N 44°52′18″E

Sultan Ezid Temple (სულთან ეზიდის ტაძარი) is a Yazidi temple located in Tbilisi, the capital of Georgia.

== Architecture ==
The temple is modeled on the Lalish temple, the holiest Yazidi temple located in Iraq and has a single spire and bare-walled exteriors similar to the Lalish temple. The premises also contain a pyramid-shaped glass building where courses on the Yazidi religion and history, as well as Georgian and Kurdish languages, are taught.

== History ==
The temple was opened in June 2015 and is named after Sultan Ezid, one of the holy men of the Yazidi faith. The temple is constructed on land donated by the Georgian Government in 2009, and the construction project was initiated in 2012 by the House of Yezidis of Georgia and financed by local businessmen. At the time of its opening in 2015, it was only the second Yazidi temple outside of Iraq.

Yazidis are one of the ethnic minorities in Georgia, practicing an ancient, monotheistic belief that has similarities to Christianity, Hinduism, Judaism, Sufism and Zoroastrianism along with elements of sun worship. Yazidi religion was officially recognized in Georgia only in 2011.

== See also ==
- Yazidis in Georgia
- Quba Mere Diwane
- List of Yazidi holy places
