= Sheikh Shems =

Yazidi holy figure

Şêx Şems
- Lord of sun, fire, light, sustenance
- Member of the Heptad
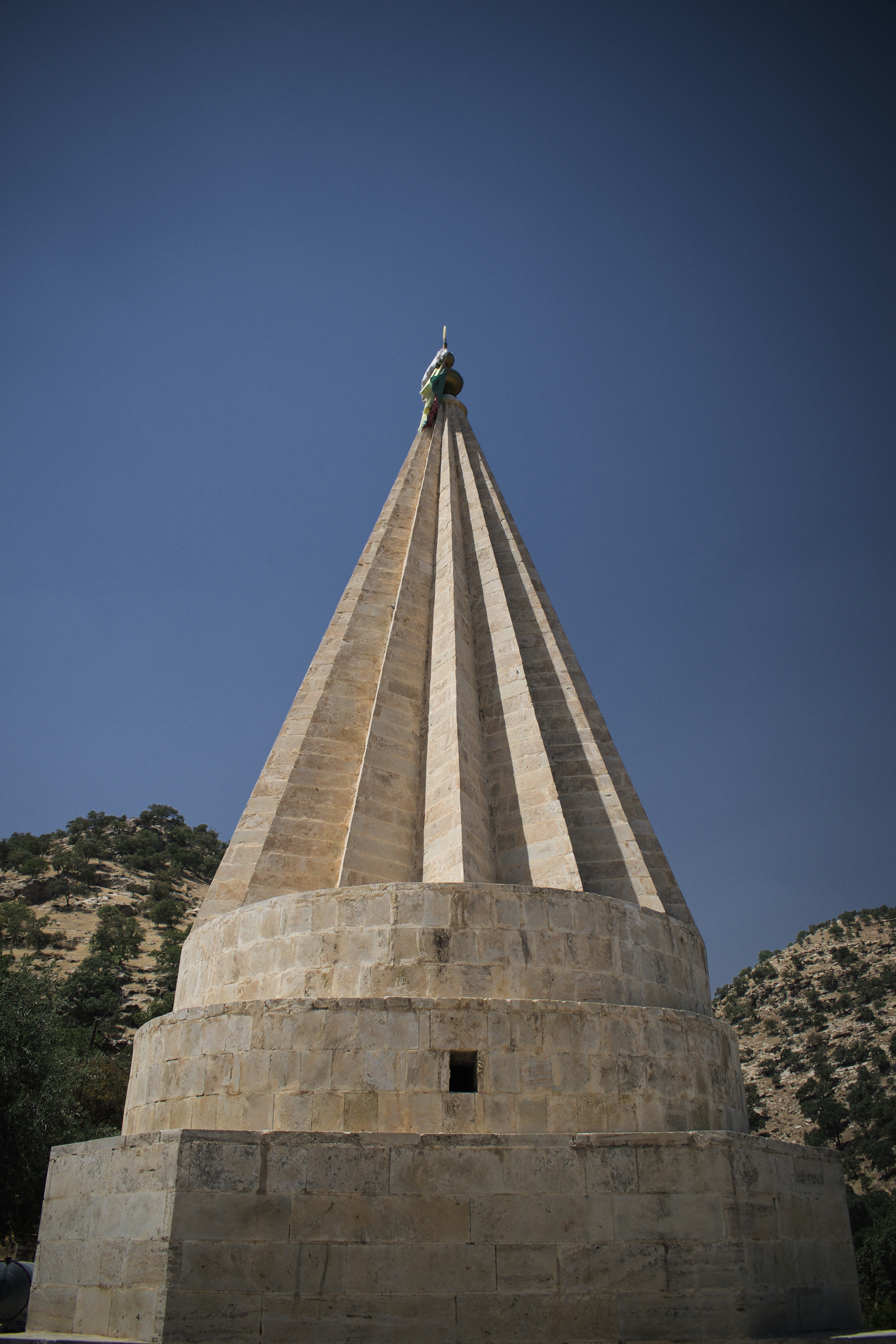
- Sheikh Shems shrine at Lalish
- Venerated in: Yazidism
- Symbols: Sun, fire, light,
- Region: Kurdistan
- Ethnic group: Yezidis
- Festivals: Rojiyên Şêşims (Şêşims fasts), three-day fasting held in his honor during December, two weeks prior to Cejna Êzî.

Genealogy
- Parents: Ezdina Mir (father)
- Siblings: Fexredîn, Nasirdîn, Sejadin
- Children: Şêx Alê Şemsa, Şêx Amadînê Şemsa, Şêx Avîndê Şemsa, Şêx Babadînê Şemsa, Şêx Bavikê Şemsa, Şêx ʿEvdalê Şemsa, Şêx Hesenê Şemsa, Şêxê Reş (Cinteyar), Şêx Tokilê Şemsa, Şêx Xidirê Şemsa, Sitya Îs (Ês), Sitiya Nisret, Sitiya Bilxan (Belqan)

Sheikh Shems or Melek Shamsadin (Kurdish: Şêx Şems, Şêşims, Melek Şemsedîn) is a holy figure venerated in Yazidism, he is considered one of the Seven Divine Beings, to all of whom God assigned the World's affairs, and his earthly incarnation is considered one of the four sons of Ezdina Mir along with Nasirdîn, Fexredîn, and Sicadîn, who are the respective ancestors and patriarchs of the four Şemsanî Sheikh lineages.

== Biography ==
Sêx Şems, also known as Şêşims, and Şemsedîn, is one of the members of the Heptad and one of the most fundamental theological symbols in Yazidism as the divinity of the Sun, source of light and life, the divine light of God. He is also linked with fire, which is his terrestrial counterpart and oaths, which are sworn by the doorway of his shrine. Annually, during the Feast of the Assembly, a ceremonial bull sacrifice is performed in front of his shrine in Lalish. Şêx Şems is the eponym of one of the four principal Şemsanî Sheikh lineages, was the patriarch of the Şemsanî family and brother of Fexredîn, Sicadîn and Nasirdîn.

== Children ==
The nine sons of Sheikh Shems are:

- Şêx Alê Şemsa
- Şêx Amadînê Şemsa
- Şêx Avîndê Şemsa
- Şêx Babadînê Şemsa
- Şêx Bavikê Şemsa
- Şêx ʿEvdalê Şemsa
- Şêx Hesenê Şemsa
- Şêxê Reş (Cinteyar)
- Şêx Tokilê Şemsa
- Şêx Xidirê Şemsa

His daughters are:

- Sitiya Îs/Ês
- Sitiya Nisret
- Sitiya Bilxan (Belqan)
