= Shehid ibn Jerr =

Seth in Yazidism

- Shehîd ibn Jerr
- Other name: Shahîd ibn Jarr
- Father: Adam

Shehîd ibn Jerr ("Witness, son of the Jar"; also Shahîd ibn Jarr) is the name for Seth in Yazidism.

== Story ==
According to a narrative among Yazidis, Adam and Eve each deposited their seeds into separate jars. While Eve's seed developed into insects after 9 months, Adam's seed gave birth to Shehid ibn Jerr, the ancestor of the Yazidis, thus portraying Yazidis as having been created separately and differently from all other human beings. However, this story is not found in religious poetic texts such as Qewls, which are the most prestigious and important of the Yazidi religious literature.

According to some Yazidi religious sources, the story of Adam and Eve does not belong to Yazidi religion and moreover, there is a Yazidi folk belief that Yazidis are not from Adam and Eve because according to that narrative, their children (brothers and sisters) married each other. This belief is confirmed by Yazidi religious leaders including Baba Sheikh and Baba Chawish, who regard sibling marriage as a great sin, which is not allowed in Yazidism.

Some Yazidis consider themselves the people of Adam because after the coming of Islam, Muslims were converting Yazidis to Islam by force, while some Yazidis escaped from Islam and did not convert, other Yazidis who were forced to stay had to consider themselves Adam's people, as it is in Islam, however, in reality, they did not believe in Adam. Many Yazidi religious texts confirm that the story of Adam and Eve was adopted as a result of fear of oppression by Muslims, and that Yazidis existed before Adam.

This is reflected in the Qewl called Qewlê Şêx Erebegî Întûzî(The Hymn of Sheikh Erebeg from Entus) as follows:

Ez newêrim bikelimim,
Heke ez bêjim, berî Adem im
Dê bi Şir'a ra recimim
Sunet berî Adem bû,
Ber firwara mîrê min bû,
Me'niya sunetê, me'niyekê mezin bû

Translation:

I dare not say it,
If I say that [Yazidi people] had existed before Adam,
[I] will be stoned according to the Shari'a,
Sunet (Yazidi community) was before Adam,
With the command of my Prince,
The 'Sunet' has a great meaning.

== Holy sites ==
He has a tomb and a qubbe (conical spire) at Bashiqa, near Mosul.
