= Mîr Tehsîn Beg =

Mîr of Yazidis

- Mîrê Şêxan
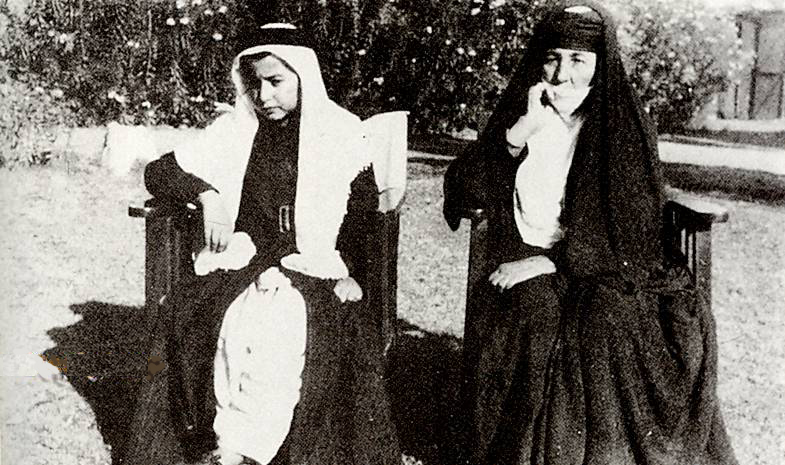
- Mîr Tehsîn Beg with his grandmother and Yazidi princess Meyan Khatun (1945)

Mîr of Sheikhan
- Reign: 1944 – 28 January 2019
- Successor: Hazim Tahsin Beg
- Born: August 15, 1933; Baadre, Kingdom of Iraq (present-day Baadre, Kurdistan Region)
- Died: 28 January 2019 (aged 85); Hanover, Germany
- Lineage: Qatanî
- Father: Mîr Sa'id Beg
- Religion: Yazidism

Mîr Tehsîn Beg or Tahseen Said (Kurdish: Mîr Tehsîn Seîd Beg; (15 August 1933 - 28 January 2019) was the hereditary leader (Mîr, or prince) of the Sheikhan principality and all Yazidis. He was also the head of the Yazidi Supreme Spiritual Council and represented the Yazidis in all matters in respect of states and tribes. Although the historic base of the family is Baadre, Tahseen Said lived in the district capital, Shekhan.

He had a son named Hazim Tahsin Said, who succeeded him after his death in 2019.

== Biography ==
The Office of Mîr is hereditary and is transmitted from father to son. At the age of 11, Tehsîn succeeded his father Sa'id Beg, who led the Yazidis until his death in 1944.

Mîr Tahsin joined the Kurdish movement in 1969. He had an office in Choman, located north-east of Erbil. When the Swedish journalist Tord Wallström met him in 1974, Mîr Tahsin stated his reason for participating in the Kurdish Revolt. He stated, “I believe in the principles of the revolt. However, there is no relation between the religion and the revolt. I am Kurdish, and all the Yazidis are Kurdish; this is the reason why I joined this revolt”. The journalist asked whether all the Yezidis are participating in the revolt, to which Mîr Tahsin responded: “No, but because their participation in the revolt has not been necessary as of yet. I've not requested their participation, but if I do, at least 95% will join the revolt. By the way, the Iraqi government executed 20 Yazidis recently in Mosul”.

He travelled in 1975 after the Algiers Agreement led to the crushing of the Kurds' resistance.

During the 1991–2003 era of the Kurdistan Region, he served as sub-ruler of the Yazidis in that territory. Mîr Tehsîn survived an assassination attempt in 2004.

On 4 August 2014, he issued a plea to world leaders concerning the plight of the Yazidis being attacked by the Islamic State of Iraq and the Levant.

He died on 28 January 2019 in the Siloah hospital in Hanover. He was buried in Ain Sifni (Shekhan) on 5 February 2019.

== See also ==
- Khurto Hajji Ismail

Preceded by Saied Beg	Mir of Yazidis; 1944–2019	Succeeded by Hazim Tahsin Said
