= Philip G. Kreyenbroek =

Dutch Iranologist (born 1948)

- Born: 1948 (age 77–78)
- Citizenship: Dutch
- Occupations: Iranologist and Kurdologist

Academic background
- Education: Leiden University

Academic work
- Discipline: Iranian studies and Kurdish studies
- Institutions: University of Göttingen (1996–2016)

Philip G. Kreyenbroek (born 1948) is a Dutch academic specialising in Iranian studies. Throughout his career, he has published several books and articles on the Zoroastrian, Kurdish, and Yazidi traditions.

== Education ==
From 1966 he studied Persian, Arabic and Turkish at the University of Amsterdam where he obtained a BSc in 1970. He transferred to the University of Utrecht where he received an MSc Iranian studies in 1972. With a scholarship from the British Council, he then pursued his studies at the School of Oriental and African Studies (SOAS) at the University of London where he studied Zoroastrianism, Gujarati, and Old and Middle Iranian from 1972 to 1973. In 1982, he obtained a doctorate from Leiden University after defending a thesis on the Sraoša in the Zoroastrian Tradition.

== Academic career ==
From 1973 he lectured on Iranian studies at Utrecht University. In 1985 he became senior lecturer on Iranian Studies at Utrecht University.

His interest for the Kurdish, Pashto and Balochi languages and cultures led him to the SOAS in London, where he lectured on Iranian languages, Zoroastrism and Sufism, between 1988 and 1993. From 1993 to 1996, he was appointed the Reader for Iranian languages and religions at the same university. His research at the SOAS focused on the oral traditions of the Iranian languages and to organize such studies, he founded the Society for Iranian Oral Studies (SIOS). From 1990 his interest turned towards the Yazidi traditions and in 1992 he undertook a journey to Iraqi Kurdistan to establish relationships with Yazidi dignitaries.

In 1996 he became the Professor on Iranian studies at the University of Göttingen where he succeeded David Neil MacKenzie. He went to Göttingen due to his interest in Yazidi culture and the fact that at the time about half of the Yazidi diaspora lived in Germany. He retired from Göttingen in 2016.

According to his own account given in his farewell interview from the university, he has seriously studied 34 languages. He has published numerous books on oriental languages and culture and has also written for the Encyclopædia Iranica.

== Writings ==
- Yezidism – its background, observances and textual tradition. Lewiston, NY: The Edwin Mellen Press, 1995.
- in collab. with Shehnaz Neville Munshi, Living Zoroastrianism: urban Parsis speak about their religion. London: Routledge, 2001.
- with Khalil Jindy Rashow, God and Sheikh Adi are perfect: sacred poems and religious narratives from the Yezidi tradition. Wiesbaden: Harrassowitz, 2005.
- Yezidism in Europe: different generations speak about their religion. Wiesbaden: Harrassowitz, 2009.
- with Yiannis Kanakis, “God first and last”: religious traditions and music of the Yaresan of Guran. Wiesbaden: Harrassowitz, 2020.
- Early Zoroastrianism and orality. Wiesbaden: Harrassowitz, 2023.

== See also ==
- Khanna Omarkhali, Yazidi scholar at the University of Göttingen
