= Lalish =

Sacred place of the Yezidis in Kurdistan, Iraq

- Laliş
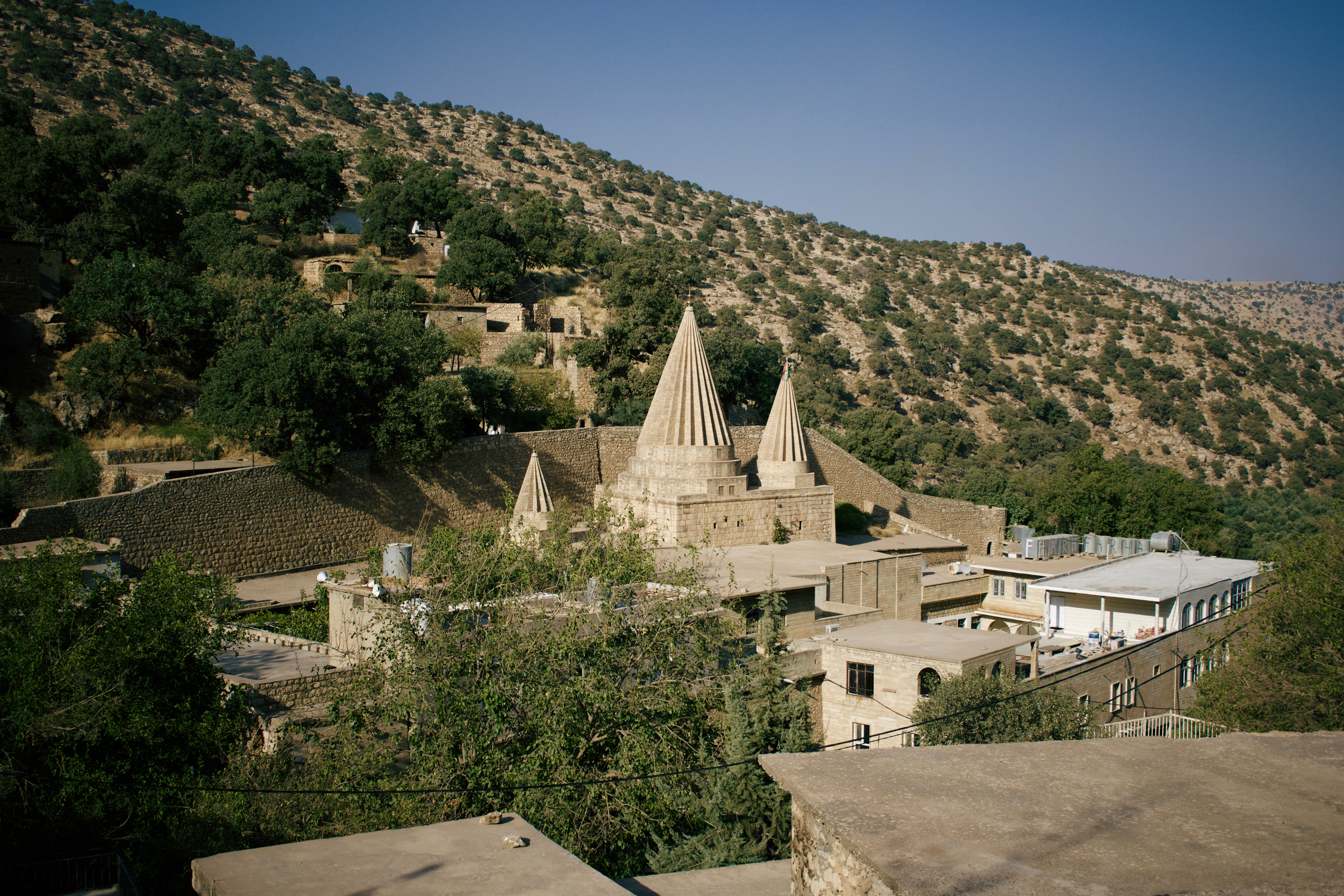
- Conical roofs over the tomb of Şîxadî in Lalish

- Location within Iraq

Religion
- Affiliation: Yazidism
- District: Shekhan district
- Region: Kurdistan Region

Location
- Location: Lalish valley, Shekhan District
- Country: Iraq
- Interactive map of Lalish
- Coordinates: 36°46′17.03″N 43°18′12.04″E

Specifications
- Dome: 6
- Elevation: 861 m (2,825 ft)

Lalish (Kurdish: لالش, romanized: Laliş,) also known to the Yazidis as Lalişa Nûranî ("luminous Lalish"), is a valley and temple complex in the Shekhan district of northern Iraq. It is the central temple of the Yazidis, who are expected to make a pilgrimage there once in their lifetime where possible. The temple is about sixty kilometers north of Mosul and 14 kilometers west from the village Ayn Sifna. The temple is built at about 861 meters above sea level and situated among three mountains. Lalish and the surrounding region is also called Mergeh. The title of the Baba Sheikh, the head of the Yazidi religion, Extiyarê Mergehê ("Old Man of Mergeh"), comes from this name.

The complex stands around the tomb of Sheikh Adi ibn Musafir, a 12th-century figure venerated by the Yazidis, which lies under the highest of six conical domes. Its buildings and grounds also include shrines of other holy figures, springs used in ritual cleansing, caves, and trees with sacred associations. The main pilgrimage, Cemaya Şîxadî, begins on 6 October and lasts seven days.

The date of construction of the complex is not established, and accounts of its history before the 12th century differ. Yazidi tradition holds that the ancient sanctuary had been taken over by Christians and was restored to the Yazidis by Sheikh Adi. Lalish was damaged on several occasions, and for some years in the 19th century the Ottomans converted it into a madrasa before it was returned to the Yazidis.

== Name and etymology ==
Lalish (Laliş) is the name of both the temple complex and the valley in which it stands, called Gelîyê Lalişê, "the valley of Lalish". Yazidis call the site Lalişa Nûranî, "luminous Lalish", and it is usually given epithets meaning "holy", "bright" and "shining".

The meaning of the name has not been established. A popular explanation derives it from two Kurmanji words, lal ("mute") and hiş ("silence"), taken as an injunction to keep silent, like a mute person, in the holy place. It also theorized that the word may instead survive from an ancient Mesopotamian language, which would account for its having no agreed meaning.

== History ==
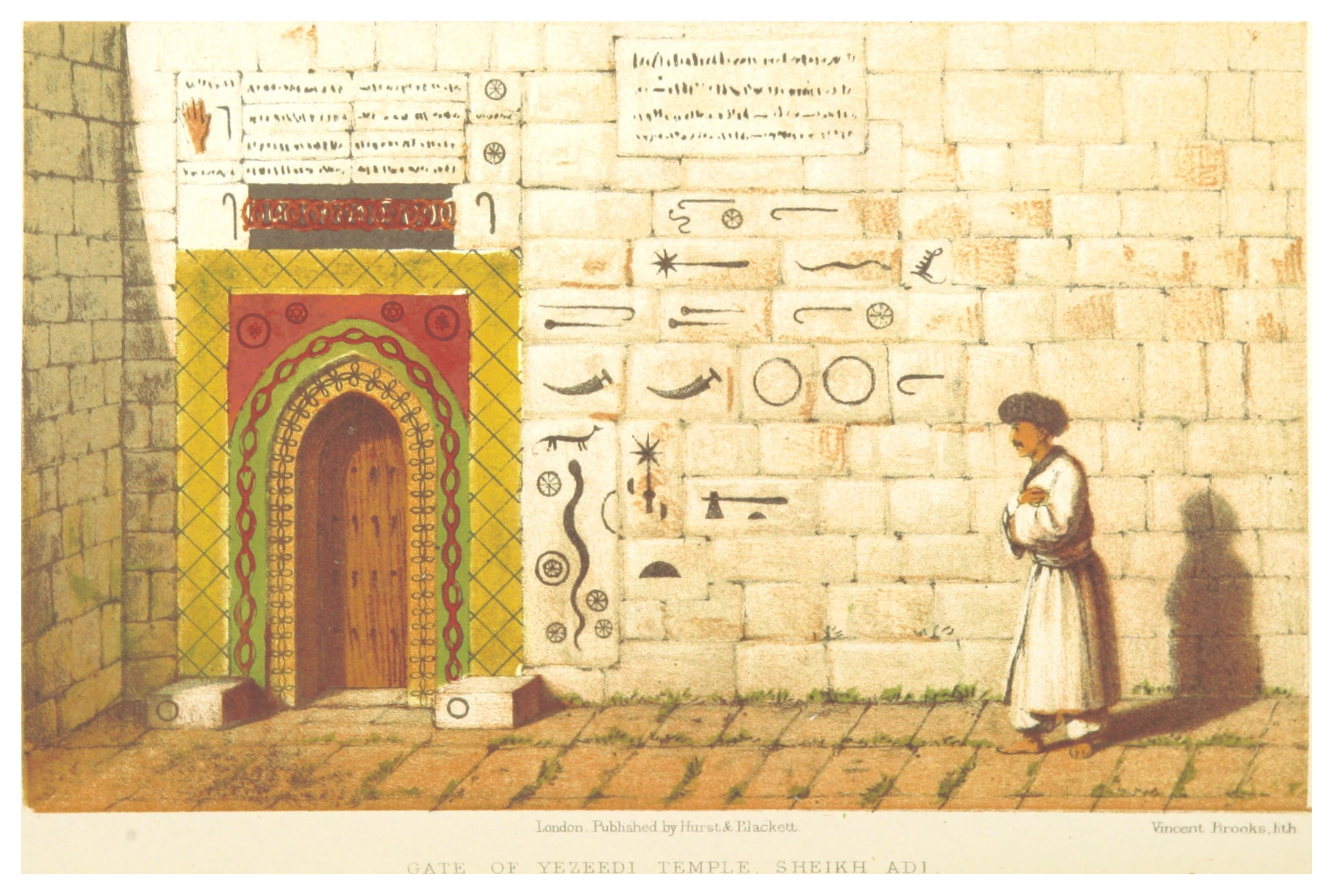
Gate of Sheikh Adi's shrine in Lalish

=== Before Sheikh Adi ===
The date at which the temple complex was built is not established. The valley has long attracted devout people, including followers of other religions.

A manuscript by an Assyro-Chaldean monk named Ramisho states that Lalish was built in the 7th century AD as a Christian monastery, and that the Yazidis under Sheikh Adi later took it from the Christians by force. The Iraqi historian George Habib rejected this, holding that Lalish had never been a Christian church. In his view it was originally a temple of sun-worshippers, and later a place of Mithraic worship.

Scholars consider the Monk Ramisho manuscript to be a forgery on several grounds. The figure active in 1219 cannot be Sheikh Adi, who lived until 1162, but is identified by Açikyildiz as Adi II, son of the first successor Abi'l-Barakat, who was executed by the Mongols in 1221. The described location of the monastery does not correspond to the location of the sanctuary of Sheikh Adi at Lalish, and the manuscripts describe only the monastery becoming the family seat rather than a religious sanctuary. According to Kreyenbroek, the account derives from Bar Hebraeus's description of the seizure of a different monastery by a man named Michael in 1256–57. Guest notes that the text "conflicts with the accounts of contemporary chroniclers" at numerous points and was copied by Alpheus Andrus in 1912 and rediscovered by Père Anastase in 1922 before being widely assessed as a forgery. Mingana attributed the authorship of forged Yazidi-related texts generally to Jeremiah Shamir, a former monk from the Rabban Hormuzd monastery in Alqosh.

Yazidi oral tradition gives a different account. It holds that after the Arab conquest the temple was occupied by Nestorian monks, who were protected by the Muslims, and that it was held by Christians until the 12th century. When Sheikh Adi arrived, he found a monk named Mar Yuhanna (Mar Hena) at Lalish and claimed the temple for the Yazidis. Mar Yuhanna agreed, on condition that he be allowed to stay among them, and the sanctuary passed back to the Yazidis.

The traveller W. A. Wigram remarked on the originality of Lalish and of Yazidi architecture, apparently referring to the faceted conical domes. He also considered that the symbols on the walls could not be regarded as Christian and were of earlier origin.

=== Arrival of Sheikh Adi ===
Sheikh Adi is said to have left for the Hakkari mountains of what is now northern Iraq at about the age of thirty. The medieval biographer Al-Dhahabi, relates that after long journeys through Syria, the Hijaz and Iraq, Sheikh Adi received a vision telling him to go to Lalish, which was his place, and that God would revive many dead souls through him. Al-Dhahabi himself says that after many years of travel, in the company of ascetics and spiritual teachers and of severe devotional practice, Adi settled in a remote mountain region near Mosul with no human company. He adds that the area later became inhabited and secure through Adi's presence, that roads once plagued by banditry became safe, and that groups among the Kurds gave up corruption under his influence. The German scholar Rudolf Frank concluded from writings attributed to Sheikh Adi that he had settled in the Hakkari mountains before 1111 and spent at least two generations there.

After settling in Lalish, people began gathering around him from across the region. His closest disciples included Mahmarashan, Pir Dawud Kharbanda, Amar Qubaysi, Pir Isebiya, and Pir Jarwan, who became his faithful companions and spread his teaching throughout the surrounding region. People came to him from the surroundings of Mosul, the Hakkari mountains, Syria, Iran and other regions and countries, bringing offerings which he distributed to the poor, and his fame spread across the entire East.

==== In Yazidi tradition ====
In Yazidi sacred hymns known as Qewls, his preaching and journey from the Levant to Lalish is likened to the sound of a bell carried by a falcon in flight: "He came to us like a falcon, ringing a bell in flight, the hearts of men are his domain." In Yazidism, the falcon is a symbol of the keenness of vision (foresight, prophecy) and loyalty to one's Master (God). The bell is a symbol of the Yazidi sermon, through which Sheikh Adi gained followers during his journey from the Levant to Lalish.

The Yazidi tradition preserves a detailed account of his journey. Yazidi tradition holds that on his way to Lalish Sheikh Adi was recognised in turn by several people who had foretold his coming and had been awaiting him, among them a boatman named Ababakr, who had previously received a vision from Sultan Ezid foretelling that a dervish named Sheikh Adi would come to his boat and must not be refused passage, a man named Ali at the village of Baadre, a man named Mand at Ain Sifni, Saidi Shamsi and Sheikh Hams of the Dinan and Qaidi tribes, as well as Usuv Hakkari and Ali Hakkari, two blind men who had likewise been awaiting a dervish who would restore their sight.

==== Medieval Arabic sources ====
Ibn al-Athir (1160–1233), writing within living memory of Sheikh Adi's passing, records that he came from Syria, from the region of Baalbek, emigrated to Mosul, and settled in the Hakkari region, a dependency of Mosul, where "people from the cultivated lands and the mountains of those regions attached themselves to him, obeyed him and had a good opinion of him, for he was very famous." Ibn Khallikan (1211–1282) records that after his period of study under a series of prominent sheikhs, he withdrew to the Hakkari mountains, where he built a hermitage (zawiya) and remained, "overwhelmed with visits from devotees," until his death.

Al-Maqrizi (d. 1441) similarly records that his tomb became one of the most visited pilgrimage sites in the region, with his followers remaining at his hermitage after his death "following his custom and tradition," while the people around them displayed the same extraordinary veneration and respect they had shown during his lifetime. Jami (died 1492), in his Nafahat al-uns, notes that "his grave in that region is one of the praised pilgrimage sites, at which miraculous graces and manifest signs occur."

==== Manuscript on How Sheikh Adi Came ====
A Chaldean manuscript preserved in a monastery says that Sheikh Adi's coming had been foretold in the region. A blind man in the land of Marj, in the area known as Lower Dasin, repeated daily that a great sheikh was approaching, and that when he came, peace and security would fill the land and no one would be able to harm another. Asked how the sheikh's arrival would be known, he replied that the sun would change through several colours, among them green, saffron, yellow, red and deep blue, with portents in the sky. When these signs appeared, the people gathered around the blind man, rejoicing but also filled with awe and fear.

The same manuscript says that Sheikh Adi arrived from a region called Sham'alaya, travelling from the west between the mountains and Mar Daniel, through the valleys and from Mount Daka and Bandawaya. At the place that would bear his name he found its head, a man named Mar Yuhanna. Mar Yuhanna welcomed him, said that he had long heard of him, and told him to settle there quickly because the faith had been preserved for him. Mar Yuhanna then left for Jerusalem, where he died.

=== Later history ===
==== Medieval period ====
Lalish lies in the region historically known as Dasin, the homeland of the Yazidis (Dasinî) north-east of Mosul, which from the late 13th century onward is increasingly attested in sources as the principality of Sheikhan, named after Sheikh Adi. Under Sheikh Adi's descendants and successors, spiritual leadership was combined with temporal authority, and the princes of Sheikhan, who governed from the village of Baadre near Lalish, came to regard themselves as his deputies. The Mir of Sheikhan is regarded as the custodian of the sanctuary, and the Yazidi religious hierarchy headed by the Baba Sheikh, who is appointed by him, is centred there. From Lalish the qewals carried the sanjak to Yazidi communities in other regions, a practice that symbolised the authority of Lalish and of the Mir.

Under Sheikh Hasan, the grandnephew of Sheikh Adi, the Sheikhan principality reached the height of its power during the 1230s and 1240s, a period during which centralization of authority was carried out and the foundational institutions and rules of Yazidi society and religion were established, including the creation of a collective council of religious figures ("Council of Holy Men") analogous to a synod.

In 1246 Sheikh Hasan was killed by Badr al-Din Lu'lu' of Mosul, and in 1254 Lu'lu' attacked the Yazidis, damaging Lalish and desecrating the tomb of Sheikh Adi. Yazidi tradition holds that Sheikh Hasan had been hidden in the house of an elderly woman, whose seven sons fought to keep him from his enemies and were killed. Places for lighting wicks at Lalish commemorate them.

In the 13th century Badr al-Din Lulu, the ruler of Mosul, attacked the Yazidis, seized their leader Sheikh Hasan, and damaged the temple and the tomb of Sheikh Adi. Yazidi tradition holds that Sheikh Hasan had been hidden in the house of an elderly woman, whose seven sons fought Lulu's soldiers to keep him from his enemies and were all killed. Places for lighting wicks at Lalish commemorate them. The temple is said to have suffered repeated attacks of this kind, and the Abbasid caliphs are reported to have sent punitive expeditions against the Yazidis.

From the 14th century onward, Yazidis developed their own religious and political institutions in the regions where they lived. The Yezidi territory was divided into seven administrative centres, each having its own Sincaq (banner, flag, province, region), more commonly known as Tawis among the Yezidis. Sincaqs are sacred bronze effigies bearing the image of a bird or peacock to symbolize Tawûsî Melek. They serve as symbols of power for each administrative centre, namely:

1. Tawisa Enzel: Welatşêx (Şêxan) - Lalish
2. Tawisa Şingalê: Shingal District
3. Tawisa Hekkarê: sometimes also called Tawisa Zozana: Historical region of Hakkari (Hakkari, Şırnak, Van and Duhok).
4. Tawisa Welatê Xalta: Region around Siirt, Batman, Diyarbakir, Mardin, etc.
5. Tawisa Helebê: Aleppo and Afrin.
6. Tawisa Tewrêzê: the city of Tabriz, located in today's Iran (Yazidis lived in the western hinterland in the Khoy region).
7. Tawisa Misqofa (Moscow): Renamed from Tawisa Serhedê after the exodus of the Yazidis from Serhed to the Russian Empire. Serhed is a region covering the cities of Kars, Ardahan, Erzurum, Ağri, Van, Bitlis and Muş.

Every six months, the Yezidi Qewals, who are trained reciters of Qewls and other forms of sacred oral Yezidi tradition, were sent out to other Yezidi-inhabited areas with military protection from the central administrative region of Shekhan and the spiritual centre of Lalish. This tradition served to preserve the Yazidi faith and doctrine. The Qewals, supported by voluntary alms, led a Sincaq through Yazidi villages to maintain spiritual legitimacy and symbolize the authority of Lalish and the Mîr.

Al-Maqrizi (1441) records that in 817 AH (1415 CE), the Islamic religious authorities organized a military expedition against the Yazidi community in the Hakkari mountains, collecting a large army with the support of several Kurdish and Arab emirs. The expedition killed large numbers of Sheikh Adi's followers, known at the time among the Kurds as Sohbetiye, took others captive, destroyed the dome over Sheikh Adi's tomb, dug up his grave, and burned his exhumed remains in the presence of the captives, telling them: "See how we burn the one of whom you claim all that you claim, yet who is unable to prevent us from doing so." The community rebuilt the shrine and subsequently "became enemies of anyone who bore the title of faqih (Islamic theologian) and killed them wherever they could."

=== Safavid and Ottoman periods ===
Ottoman records of 1572 report measures taken against the Yazidi sanctuary of Lalish, stating that earlier religious rulings had declared the sect infidel and had ordered the shrine to be demolished. Despite these measures, the reports also noted that Yazidi followers continued to visit the site and perform their rituals, including pilgrims arriving from Damascus, Aleppo, and other regions such as Botan, Mosul, Hazo, and Erbil. In his response, the sultan ordered that the followers of the group be investigated by local judges and punished according to the law if acts of rebellion or disorder were proven.

During Nader Shah's siege of Mosul in 1743, his forces turned against the Dasin region directly. In August of that year, Afsharid troops attacked the Dasin country and carried out massacres of Yazidis and Christians, including at the Lalish temple, sparing neither women nor children. Votive inscriptions at the sanctuary dated 1779 and 1781 show that pilgrims, many from Sinjar, continued to come. In 1806 the Yazidi ruler Mir Hasan Beg oversaw the rebuilding of the sanctuary. During the genocide of Muhammad Pasha of Rawanduz in 1832–1834, Lalish was plundered, and women and children who had sheltered in a cave beneath the sanctuary were suffocated when soldiers lit fires at its entrance.

European visitors recorded the temple in the 19th century. Drawings of its gate and entrance court were made by Badger in 1849 and of the temple by Layard in the same year, and a plan of the complex drawn in 1911 and published by Hinrichs in 1913.

The Mir at Baadre was recognised by the Ottoman authorities, and the revenues of the princely family came partly from the shrines. In 1948 the mausoleum of Sheikh Adi yielded 1,500 Iraqi dinars of an annual total of 8,185.

In 1892 an Ottoman expedition during the campaign to convert the Yazidis targeted Lalish. The soldiers removed sacred objects, which official documents list as five bronze peacock figures, a ram, a snake, a nightingale known as the Shahrur, a rod, a cup, a rosary, a comb and a staff, and took them to Mosul and later Baghdad. The settlement that ended the campaign handed the sanctuary to Muslim dervishes, who opened a school there, and when a Yazidi procession visited in 1894 the temple had been made into a mosque and emptied of its contents.

The occupation of the temple eventually led to a fierce and widespread rebellion by Yezidis of Shekhan and Shingal against the Ottomans and the neighbouring Muslim Kurdish tribes. It was not until 1904 that the Yezidis, under the leadership of Mir Ali Beg, who, after his return from exile Mir Ali Beg recovered the sanctuary with the help of the Ottoman official Sadiq Damluji. The Yazidis are said to have driven the Muslim occupiers out in 1904. The sacred objects were returned under the governor Suleiman Nazif Pasha, who in May 1914 announced that the Yazidis of Mosul province would be recognised as a distinct religious community.

=== 20th century ===
In the 1970s, while Mir Tahsin Beg was in exile, the Ba'athist government supported a rival claimant to the emirate, but control of Lalish remained decisive for legitimacy and neither rival secured it. After Kurdish self-government began in 1992, the part of Yazidi territory containing Lalish came under the Kurdistan Regional Government, while Tahsin Beg kept custody of the temple.

=== Modern day ===
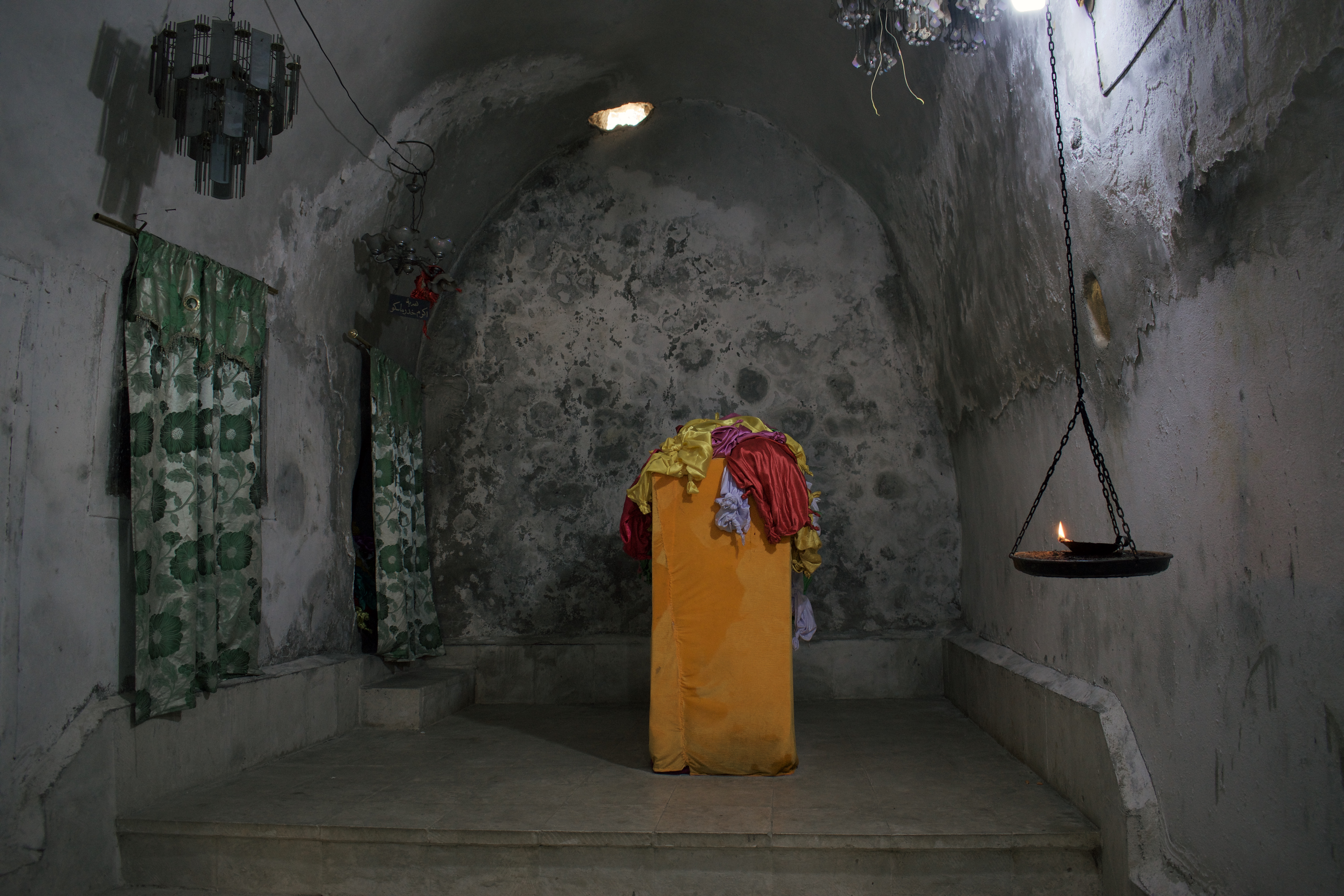
Shrine of Shekh Shems, saint of the Sun, at Lalish

Beginning on 3 August 2014, Yazidi refugees fled from Sinjar and took shelter in the temple after the militants of the Islamic State of Iraq and the Levant attacked and captured Sinjar and its environs. When some 50,000 Yezidis trapped on Sinjar Mountain were freed by way of a land corridor opened by the Peoples's Protection Units (YPG) and Kurdistan Workers' Party (PKK), the majority fled through Syria and circled around the north of the Sinjar mountain range to reach Lalish and Shekhan within the de facto Nineveh Plains, Kurdistan Region.

== Significance in Yazidism ==
=== In Yazidi religious life ===
Lalish is the most important place in Yazidism. The most important Yazidi shrines holding the tombs of saints stand in its valley, and the main sanctuary is the mausoleum of Sheikh Adi, who taught in Lalish. Yazidis from many countries travel to Lalish each year. Those able to do so go to Lalish for the spring Yazidi New Year festival, when whole families gather in festive dress. The Qewl "I Sing" (Qewlê Distrêm) contains a metaphorical description of the Lalish sanctuary. It describes Lalish as Sheikh Adi's own dwelling place and as the spiritual center of Yazidi life, directing the sick and the sorrowful to go there:

If you fall ill and sickness strikes you,
hurry to Lalish, and Şîxadî himself will free you from every torment.
If you are sad and your soul grieves in its confinement,
hurry to Lalish, and Şîxadî will cure you of your trouble.

The earth of the valley is sacred, and Yazidis may not spit on it or tread on it in shoes. Every evening at sunset a ceremony of lighting fires is held throughout the valley. The valley is dotted with small whitewashed shrines called nîşan, each with a niche for a fire, and when their wicks are lit the valley resembles a starry sky.

Pilgrims receive a small pellet of earth called berat as proof of their visit. It is made in Lalish from earth taken from the Cave of Berat and water from the White Spring, mixed with salt and leaven, and the pellets are dried on a roof. Traditionally it is made by unmarried Xilmetkars and Feqîrs who live in chastity. Yazidis carry the berat as a physical link with Lalish, and those living abroad can obtain one from those who have made the pilgrimage. At Lalish worshippers kiss it during the prayers at sunrise and sunset and wrap it in white cloth. It must not touch dirt or be touched by a non-Yazidi. It is also held to be a talisman from Sheikh Adi's sanctuary, which allows the holder to pray to the Tawûsî Melek for help.

=== Sheikh Adi and Feast of the Assembly ===
Yazidis hold that the one God appears in several forms, three of them principal: Sultan Êzîd, Şîxadî and Tawûsî Melek. They are regarded as one and not to be separated. Sheikh Adi is venerated as the earthly incarnation of God, who had appeared earlier under the name Êzîd and promised to come to earth. Yazidis also believe that God and the angels can incarnate in the form of holy people, who work miracles, strengthen the faith and heal. According to Yazidi hymns Sheikh Adi lived on earth preaching love of God and of people and in extreme old age ascended to heaven. He is held to have left the world in 1162, and the place of his ascension is in Lalish.

The term used within the community for his place of interment at Lalish is not "grave" or "tomb" but sindruk, from the Arabic sundūq, meaning box or chest, understood as the resting place of a saint's relics, reflecting the Yazidi belief that saints depart this world in a manner that transcends ordinary death. The annual Cemaya Şîxadî feast at Lalish commemorates his departure ("Qedemguhastin") through a specific ritual: the Berê Şibakê, a stretcher historically used to carry his relics, is reassembled each year and cleansed in the waters of the Kanîya Spî spring while priests sing the Qewlê Texta ("Hymn of the Throne"), which describes the creation of the world and the divine throne.

=== In Yazidi mythology ===
In Yazidi cosmogony, Lalish first existed as a celestial and non-material ideal model of the living world, before its material version on earth was established. Lalish is described as the centre of the earth, corresponding to God's throne at the centre of the heavens.

After the waters released from the primordial Pearl had spread into a boundless sea, God sent four angels to travel over it. They halted with their Lord where Lalish now stands and cast leaven into the sea, which thickened, and smoke rose from it and became the seven heavens. In the Qewl, Qewlê Zebûnî Meksûr ("Hymn of the Weak and Broken One"), the king and his four companions sail round the sea and halt at Lalish. There the king cast leaven into the sea, which thickened, and smoke rose from it and became the seven heavens:

25. Padşê min li merkebê dibû siyare,
Padşayê û her çar yare,
Lê seyrîn çar kinare,
Li Lalişê sekinîn got: «eve heq ware».

26. «Heq war» got û sekinîn,
Padşê min havên havête behrê
û behr meynîn,
Duxanek jê duxinî, her heft ezman pê nijinîn.

25. My Padishah found himself on a boat,
Padishah and all Four Friends,
Went round the four sides,
They stopped in Lalish and said: "This is the place of Truth."

26. "The place of Truth" they said and stopped,
My Padishah descended leaven and
the sea coagulated,
The smoke billowed and all seven heavens were created.

The spring Kaniya Sipî is held to be a vestige of that leaven. The hymn describes the earth as still empty after forty years, until Lalish came down from heaven and brought life with it:

31. Paşî çil salî bi hijmare,
Erdê bi xwe ra negirt heşare,
Heta Laliş navda nedihate xware.

32. Laliş ku nizilî,
Şaxa muhbetê navda e'dilî,
Erd şa bû û bi renga xemilî.

33. Laliş ku dihate,
Li erdê şîn dibû nebate,
Pê zeynîn çiqas kinyate.

34. Ku kinyat pê zeynand,
Çar qism tê hincinand,
Axe û ave û baye û agire,
Qalibê Adem pêxember jê nijinand.

31. Though forty years have passed,
The Earth did not become solid,
Until Lalish descended on it.

32. As soon as Lalish came down,
A branch of Love grew inside,
The earth was joyful and was clad in colours.

33. When Lalish descended [into the earthly lowlands],
On Earth, plants grew,
And the world became adorned in them.

34. As soon as the world became adorned,
Four elements were mixed together,
Earth and water and wind and fire,
He made out of them the shell of Prophet Adam.

Yazidi texts place the Garden of Eden, where the first man lived, on the site of Lalish Qewlê Keniya Mara (The Hymn of the Laughter of Snakes) calls Lalish a paradise and the dwelling of Şîxadî:

44. Laliş behişteke qewiye
Û meleke ji 'enzeliye
Û mekanê Siltan Şîxadiye

44. Lalish is a mighty paradise,
And a house from pre-eternity,
And the abode of Sultan Şîxadî.

== Sacred sites and features ==
Lalish is a complex of numerous buildings of differing purpose, divided into various functional zones.

=== Layout and buildings ===
==== Approach ====
Pilgrims traditionally reached Lalish from the direction of the village of Baadre, descending into the valley from Mount Mişet. On the mountain road from the plain there are three places of greeting (silavgeh), those of Sheikh Adi, Pîr Mehmed Reşan and Sitiya Ês, from which the valley and its shrines first come into view. Arriving pilgrims would fall to the ground and kiss it on sighting the tops of the domes. At the place of greeting of Sheikh Adi stands a large upright stone covered with lime. Mount Arafat rises to the north of the temple and Mount Hizret to the west.

A small bridge over the stream that leaves the valley, the Sarat Bridge (Pira Selatê), stands for the bridge of the afterlife that Yazidis hold every soul must cross after death. Pilgrims remove their shoes before reaching it and cross it at a run three times; a soul weighed down by sin is said to fall. The bridge is 10 metres long, 3 metres wide and 2 metres high, about 1 km from the Xana Êzîd, the building where pilgrims once spent the night. The sanctity of the springs is held to end at the bridge, and below it the water may be put to everyday use. The bridge was rebuilt in 1980 on its earlier pattern and renovated in 2004.

==== Gates and courtyards ====
The court of the temple is entered through the arched Darge Mir (Dergê Mîr, "Gate of the Ruler"), identified as the gate of Amadin, a son of Sheikh Shems and a leader of the Shamsani sub-caste of sheikhs. Yazidis believe that the soul of the dead is judged in front of this gate.

Near the entrance to the court is the Sûka Merîfetê, the "Market of Knowledge", where food was once sold to pilgrims and holy texts were explained to them. Narrow lanes lead off it, several named for the tribes whose members take part in the rites of the pilgrimage, among them the Dina and the Qaidî, and for the village of Êsiyan. Another lane is named for the Zebenî, the guardians of hell who carry sinners' souls there.

The temple itself is entered by the Dergê Şîxadî, "the door of Sheikh Adi", also called Derê Qapîyê. No one may enter bareheaded, and visitors step over the threshold and kiss it and the wall before going in.

In front of this door lies the Celsa Şîxadî, the court where Sheikh Adi's council is said to have sat. During the sema an iron candelabrum for the burning wicks is placed at a fixed spot in this court, called Guharzêr û Zerguhar, and the dancers circle it three times. The valley has other named gathering places, among them the celsas of Melek Fexredîn, Melik Şêxisin and Sheikh Shems and the court of Şêxûbekir.

Gaykuj, a small court, is where the waters of Kaniya Sipî and Kaniya Zimzim join. Its small pools are called Merzêd Behrê, "borders of the sea", and a grave beside them is held to be that of Adam. The court takes its name from ga ("bull") and kuj ("kill"); bulls and sheep were slaughtered here, and simat (şîlan), the sacred dish of meat and ground wheat, was boiled in large cauldrons for pilgrims and the poor. Each spring the temple's servants carry firewood to it on their backs. In the part of the court called Kela Xerqe, branches of the zergûz tree, a variety of nut tree that bears no fruit, are boiled with the woollen garments of the Feqîrs, which come out black or dark brown after two days.

==== Domes ====
Lalish has six faceted conical domes (qub), which are held to represent the sun's rays descending from heaven to earth. Three rise over the central building: the highest, that of Sheikh Adi, covers his tomb, flanked by those of Şêx Hesen (Melik Şêxisin) and Şêx Mûsê Enzelî. The other three are those of Şêx Mişeleh (Xefûrê Rêyan), a patron of travellers, the first dome at the entrance to the temple; of Kaniya Sipî, over the spring; and of Şêşims (Sheikh Shems), the angel of the sun. A small domed marker for Pîr Mend, which is not counted among the six, stands before the Dergê Mîr.

==== Central building and shrines ====
The tomb of Sheikh Adi, under the largest dome, is the focus of veneration for pilgrims. At the entrance to the main hall, on the right, is the pool of Nasirdîn, the angel of death. In the Dîwana Berê Şibakê, the hall where Sheikh Adi's council sat, the bier of the saint is placed during the pilgrimage, and a place on the carpet is reserved for Şêxûbekir.

The temple contains symbolic gates of Paradise (Dergê Bihuştê) and Hell, a place of spirits, a place of the guardians of hell, and places of angels. Many corners of the temple and valley are named for the saints, angels and spirits associated with them.

Hesin Dena, a holy man of the Hesen Pîrik clan, has his shrine in the temple beside the domes of Sheikh Adi and Şêx Mûsê Enzelî. The hall also holds ancient jars of the olive oil used for the lamps.

Among the other shrines are the sanctuary of Sheikh Shems, which holds his tomb, and the building of Şêx Ebdilqadirê Rehmanî, brother of Şêxûbekir and Şêx Simayilê Enzelî, where a curtain beside the tomb hides a cave of the jinn.

The temple servants live in rooms on two floors. At festivals the qewals lodge on the ground floor, while the upper floor holds the quarters of the head of the clergy, the Extiyarê Mergehê, and of the Babê Çawîş, with the rooms of the feqrayas and the kabanî (the senior feqraya) beside them. There is also a kitchen (Metbexa Şîxadî) and a hall for receiving guests. The Koçka Zoro stands on the site of a building put up in the early 20th century by Zoro Axa of the Xaltî tribe.

=== Landscape and sacred natural sites ===
==== Mountains ====
Several sacred mountains surround the temple.

===== Mount Arafat =====
Mount Arafat (Çiyayê Erefatê) lies to the north of the temple. Several holy places stand on or beneath it, among them the caves of Pîr Omer Xalan and Pîr Hesin Çinarî, which lie side by side. The cave of Omer Xalan is held to have been the place of solitude of the dervish Babê Îso. The Stûna Miraza, the "pillar of wishes", is in a cave at the mountain's foot. Pilgrims tie coloured ribbons to the branches of a tree on its slope and make wishes there, and some go to it to ask for blessing and livelihood. Sanctuaries and small shrines (aqide, nîşangeh) stand on the mountain, which is also visited by Yazidis outside the festival days.

===== Mount Hizret =====
Mount Hizret (Çiyayê Hizretê) lies to the west of the temple. The cave of Mîr Birahîm is on it.

===== Mount Mişet =====
Mount Mişet (Çiyayê Mişetê) is the source of Kaniya Sipî, the holiest spring of Lalish, which flows from it through the valley. Pilgrims coming from the direction of Baadre traditionally descended into the valley from this mountain. The Silavgeh of Pîr Mehmed Reşan lies on its back.

===== Mount Mişrûgîya =====
Mount Mişrûgîya (Çiyayê Mişrûgîya) lies beside Mount Arafat. Its name refers to the jinn, described as beings better than humans, and the valley between it and Arafat is called the Valley of the Qewals (Gelîyê Qewalan). The gully of Newala Waweylê runs along this valley. In Yazidi belief it is the place where souls that the guardians of hell have taken are punished and tormented. The spring of Kaniya Berbaykê rises at the foot of the mountain, and its water is used against certain ailments. The Şikefta Cina ("Cave of Jinns") lies on the mountain near the Valley of the Qewals.

==== Caves ====
The Çilexane ("cave of the forty") lies beneath the temple and consists of several halls. The water of Zimzim runs through it, joins Kaniya Sipî at Gaykuj and leaves the temple under the Sarat Bridge. It contains the graves of Yazidi holy men, among them Koçek Birîm. Sheikh Adi is said to have spent forty days of fasting in it. Oil wicks are lit there on holy days, and clergy sing hymns in it on the first and last days of the winter and summer forty-day fasts. Only the temple's servants and senior clergy may enter.

The earth for berat is dug from a cave between the buildings of Sheikh Shems and Xatûna Fexra, said to date from thousands of years before Sheikh Adi. Its entrance is narrow and is climbed on hands and knees, and inside it widens to three or four metres across. People enter with lamps, dig the earth, sieve it and knead it into dough, and shape it into balls about the size of an olive stone. Berat is given to pilgrims as a token of their visit.

Other caves are named for holy figures: those of Şêx Mend and Seyîd Niûm, each beside the building of that name; of Pîr Mehmedê Reben, above the Şerfedîn building; of Pîr Omer Xalan and Pîr Hesin Çinarî on Mount Arafat; and of Mîr Birahîm on Mount Hizret. The cave of Omer Xalan was the place of solitude of the dervish Babê Îso. The caves of Pîr Mam Şivan, a shepherd saint and patron of sheep and goats, and of Abdurahman share an entrance.

==== Springs ====
The holiest spring is Kaniya Sipî ("White Spring"), which rises on Mount Mişet and flows under its domed building. According to Yazidi tradition it alone remained clear in the Flood, and it marks the trace of the leaven from which the earth was made. Pilgrims arriving at Lalish are sealed (mor kirin) with its water; each Yazidi is also sealed with it at birth, and it is used to wash off the pollution of birth. On arrival a pilgrim also performs the rite of sela in the waters of Kaniya Sipî and Kaniya Zimzim, sprinkling the water from the hand while praying for relatives. Boys and girls were formerly sealed at separate places, which survive as the Kaniya Kurika and Kaniya Keçika. Each spring Yazidis use the water to make their leaven and yoghurt starter ritually pure.

At festivals the dîlana derê Kaniya Sipî is danced in the court before the spring to the def and şibab, and joining the circle is considered a good deed. Men and women have separate approaches to the water, and a married couple may not enter Kaniya Sipî or Kaniya Zimzim together, or they become spiritual brother and sister.

Kaniya Zimzim flows from a cave beneath the main building, entered by the Dergê Zimzimê. Pilgrims wade into the cave and wash their faces with the water. A whitewashed niche in its wall is held to cure back pain if one leans against it three times. According to a sacred hymn, forty sheikhs of Baghdad, led by Ahmad al-Rifa'i and Abu al-Wafa Hulwani, came to expel Sheikh Adi. The cave was too small for them, and he told them to put their backs against its wall and call on God and on him, whereupon it widened. When they asked for water for their ablutions, he struck the rock with his staff and called for water. The spring he made is said to have its source in the well of Zamzam at Mecca, and the sheikhs, convinced of his sanctity, left him.

Several lesser springs lie in the valley. Kaniya Kulava, in the temple court, is used to wash sacred objects. Kaniya Şivana, near the Sarat Bridge and the zergûz tree, supplies water for washing clothes and bathing, which may not be done in the two sacred springs. Kaniya Berbaykê rises at the foot of Mount Mişrûgîya and its water is used against certain ailments. Kaniya Kewatir is named for a Feqîr who often sat beside it, and a "golden spring", Kanîzerk, lies in the court.

==== Trees and wish places ====
Every tree, bush and stone in the valley has its own name and sanctity, and cutting trees or branches is forbidden. The temple's servants fetch firewood from outside the valley. Among the named trees is the Dara Zengilê, the "tree of bells", where clergy returning from their round of the Yazidi villages stop first and hang their sacred objects. The Dara Singa is on the road from Baadre, and a peg is driven in beneath it as a charitable act. A piece of bark or a twig of the Dara Xewê, "tree of sleep", near Kaniya Sipî is tied to the cradle of a child who sleeps badly. The Dara Nezerê protects against the evil eye. The Dara Qelendara is the tree where wandering dervishes gathered. The Dara Leylê is that of Leyle, mother of the Yazidis and wife of Şeyîd bin Cer. Relatives of a feverish person tie a band to the Dara Ta û Bawî and ask for healing, and coloured ribbons are tied to a tree on Mount Arafat, where wishes are made.

The slopes around the temple carry mulberry, oak, nut and olive trees, none of which may be cut. The olive grove is said to have been planted by Sheikh Adi, and the olives are never eaten because their oil lights the lamps of the temple. Servants tend the grove and make the oil, treading the olives barefoot in a pool with water and boiling off the juice until only oil remains.

Several places in Lalish are associated with wishes. The columns of the central hall and the graves of saints are hung with strips of coloured cloth, on which pilgrims tie and untie knots as they wish. In the hall of Hesin Dena is the Berê Miraza (also Berê Muelleq), a stone cut from the rock. A pilgrim, eyes closed, throws a piece of cloth on to it three times, and if the cloth stays on, the wish will be granted. The Stûna Miraza ("pillar of wishes"), an old stone pillar in a cave at the foot of Mount Arafat, is embraced with both arms while a wish is made.

=== Symbols ===
Symbols appear on the walls of Lalish, and further examples are found at the shrines of nearby Bozan. They have been interpreted mainly as solar and protective signs, though the origin of several of them is not established.

==== Snake ====
The snake ("Mar") is interpreted as a protector of the house, and snake images or zigzag patterns are placed on gates, doorframes and entrances. This protective role is linked to an ancient myth of a snake guarding the world tree. Two intertwined snakes form a braided symbol that is read as divine twins and a sign of fertility.

==== Peacock ====
The peacock symbolises Tawûsî Melek, the Peacock Angel, and the diversity of the world. Two peacocks facing each other with the world tree between them are read as a sign of the divine triad. Birds in general are taken as solar symbols.

==== Lion ====
A lion ("Şêr") is usually read as a sign of power and might. In cult imagery, however, lions, especially a facing pair, are interpreted as symbols of a solar deity. Such a pair is sometimes shown beside facing peacocks.

==== Cross ====
The cross ("Xaç") appears on the walls of Lalish. Several hypotheses have been offered for its origin. The first is that the cross is further evidence of the antiquity of Yazidism, whose foundations arose among the early farming Indo-European tribes. The second ties the sign, along with the six-pointed star, to the reforms of Sheikh Adi in the 12th century, when the Crusades were beginning. In their view Adi appears to have secured peaceful outcomes in a number of tense interreligious situations in the Near East, including preserving the foundations of Yazidism through some compromises, and the cross and the six-pointed star may reflect his wish to show Yazidi tolerance to people of other faiths. The scholars Grigoriev, Ivasko and Pirbari doubt that Christians made the cross while they held Lalish, partly because this cannot account for the six-pointed star, since the temple was never in Jewish hands.

The symbologist scholar Ariel Golan, connects appearance of the cross with the emergence of Indo-Europeans and traces it to the Neolithic period (8th to 6th millennium BC) and dates the emergence of the cross as a cult sign in the early farming zone of the Near East, which covers parts of modern Turkey, Iran, Syria and northern Iraq, to about the 7th millennium BC. On this account the cross originated as a graphic image of the "fiery bird", one of the forms of a male earth deity. Much later the fiery bird came to personify the sun god and the cross became a solar sign, and later still, for various reasons, the cross became the symbol of Christianity, as it is understood today.

==== Six-pointed star ====
The six-pointed star ("Stêra Şeşgoşê") on the walls of Lalish symbolizes the union of male and female, the two principles of life. Like the cross, it is held to be older than its present-day understanding as the Jewish "Star of David". The scholars Grigoriev, Ivasko and Pirbari regard it as a symbol of the ancient Indo-European farming tribes. The name "Star of David" comes from a legend that King David used a hexagonal shield in his fight with Goliath, and medieval Jewish Kabbalistic thought read the sign as a combination of the alchemical signs for fire and water.

==== Comb ====
A comb ("Şe") symbolises cleanliness, and its image serves as a protective charm.

==== Staff ====
A staff ("wekaz"/"gopal") is a symbol of holiness and age.

==== Rosettes ====
Rosettes of various kinds are interpreted as solar symbols.

== See also ==
- Index of articles related to the Yezidis
- Genocide of Yazidis by ISIL
- Yazidi Black Book
- Yazidism
- Yazidis in Iraq
- List of Yazidi holy places

== Sources ==
- Grigoriev, S. A.; Ivasko, L. V.; Pirbari, D. V. (2008). Lalişa Nûranî / Святой Лалыш / Holy Lalish (in Kurdish, Russian, and English). Ekaterinburg: Basko. ISBN 978-5-91356-048-3.
- Pirbari, Dimitri; Shchedrovitsky, Dmitri (2016). Тайна жемчужины. Езидская теософия и космогония [The Mystery of the Pearl: Yezidi Theosophy and Cosmogony] (in Russian). Tbilisi: Tbilisi Center for Yezidi Studies. ISBN 978-5-906045-15-7.
- Guest, John S. (27 January 2023). The Yezidis: A Study in Survival. Taylor & Francis. ISBN 978-1-000-81750-8.
- Rodziewicz, Artur (2022). Eros and the Pearl: The Yezidi Cosmogonic Myth at the Crossroads of Mystical Traditions. Berlin: Peter Lang. ISBN 978-3-631-88106-4.
- Açikyildiz, Birgül (23 December 2014). The Yezidis: The History of a Community, Culture and Religion. Bloomsbury Publishing. ISBN 978-0-85772-061-0.
- al-Dhahabi, Shams al-Din Muhammad ibn Ahmad ibn Uthman (2001). Siyar A'lam al-Nubala' (in Arabic). Vol. 20. Mu'assasat al-Risala.
- Frank, Rudolf (1911). Scheich 'Adî, der grosse Heilige der Jezîdîs (in German). M. Schmersow.
- Ali, Majid Hassan (1 November 2019). "Genocidal Campaigns during the Ottoman Era: The Firmān of Mīr-i-Kura against the Yazidi Religious Minority in 1832–1834". Genocide Studies International. 13 (1): 77–91. doi:10.3138/gsi.13.1.05. ISSN 2291-1847.
- Guli, Nizar (1 January 2025). "Mîrnişînên Dasin û Şêxan li Serdemê Osmanîyan (1515–1750): Vêkolîneke Dokûmenkarî" [The Emirate of Dasin and Sheikhan in the Ottoman Era 1515–1750: A Documentary Study]. Peywend.
- Mossaki, Nodar; Pirbari, Dimitri (2 December 2019). "Кончина эмира езидов и будущее езидской общины" [The Death of the Yazidi Emir and the Future of the Yazidi Community]. Азия и Африка сегодня (in Russian) (11): 49–54. doi:10.31857/S032150750007023-7. ISSN 0321-5075.
- Fuccaro, Nelida (1994). Aspects of the social and political history of the Yazidi enclave of Jabal Sinjar (Iraq) under the British mandate, 1919–1932 (PhD thesis). Durham University.
