= Yazidi Black Book =

Holy text

The Yazidi Black Book (Kurdish: Mishefa Reş) is one of two books written in the style of a holy book of the Yazidis in their native Kurmanji (Northern Kurdish) tongue, the other being the Yazidi Book of Revelation (Kitêba Cilwe). The authenticity of these two books has been questioned. Dr. Frederick Forbes visited Sinjar in 1838 and ascribed the authorship of the Yazidi Black Book to Sheikh Adi ibn Musafir. It is believed that the content of the Yazidi Black Book is a fusion of authentic Yazidi traditions and beliefs with Western forgeries.

== Content ==
The book discusses Yezidi cosmogony, the creation of humanity, history of the Yazidis and prohibitions in regard to food, deeds and pronunciation of words. The book begins with cosmogony and continues with how "God created the white Pearl out of his most precious essence. He also created the bird Angar. God placed the white Pearl on the back of this bird, and he dwelt on it for forty thousand years."

The book moreover states that the first day of creation was Sunday, which contradicts oral traditions that claims that the first day of creation was a Saturday. God created Tawûsî Melek on Sunday, on Monday he created Shaykh Ḥasan or Dardāʾīl, on Tuesday he created Shaykh Shams al-Dīn or Isrāfīl, on Wednesday he created Shaykh Abū Bakr or Mīkhāʾīl, on Thursday he created Sajād al-Dīn or ʿAzrāʾīl, on Friday he created Nāṣir al-Dīn or Shamnāʾīl and on Saturday he created Yādīn (Fakhr al-Dīn) also known as Nūrāʾīl. The book then states that God Melek Taus is the ruler of them all and God then moved on to create seven heavens, the earth, the sun and the moon. Then, Yādīn created humans, animals, birds and beasts, which God put in a pocket of cloth that would come out accompanied by these seven angels. The book also mentions Gabriel, Adam, and Eve.

However, the presence of a textual Black Book and Book of Revelation alone may be enough to alter the Yazidi religion to become more consistent and coherent across villages. This is due in part to the rising literacy rate among Yazidis, such that those who can read or write hold a more esteemed position, and the written word is treated as more valid than the oral tradition.

== See also ==
- Index of articles related to the Yezidis
