= Yazidi Book of Revelation =

Holy text

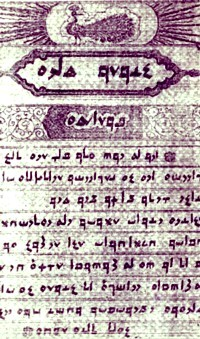
A page from Yazidi Book of Revelation manuscript

The Yazidi Book of Revelation (Kurdish: Kitêba Cilwe, Sorani Kurdish: کتێبی جلوە lit. 'The Book of Revelation') is the title of a Kurdish-language book which is assumed to be one of two sacred books of Yazidis, the other being the Yazidi Black Book (Mishefa Reş), which describes Yazidi cosmogony. However, the authenticity of its sacredness has not been confirmed. The book presents itself as the words of Tawûsî Melek, wherein he allocates the different responsibilities, blessings and misfortunes as he desires and which humans have no say in.

== Discovery and authenticity ==
Shaykh ʿAbdallāh al-Ratabkī (d. 1746) mentioned a sacred Yazidi text called Jilwa and he ascribed its authorship to Sheikh Adi ibn Musafir. This was echoed by R. H. W. Empson in 1928, who moreover stated that the book was written by Sheikh Adi to Fakhr ad-Din ibn Adi. R. Frank, however, in his discussion of the Jilwa in 1911, denied this.

When foreigners began studying Yazidis in the 1850s, they believed that the Yazidis had sacred books and thus tried to find them. While Yazidis do have sacred books as attested in their oral traditions, it was not known whether they were kept secret in a Yazidi home or burned during massacres. Copies of the Yazidi Book of Revelation were found in the 1880s, and a number of copies purporting to be authentic circulated in Iraq from the late 19th century to the early 20th century. Assyrian Jeremiah Shamir, a former monk and known manuscript dealer from Ankawa, was seemingly implicated in this affair.

A translation of the Yazidi Book of Revelation and Yazidi Black Book was done by Alpheus Andrus in 1891, and later by Edward Granville Browne in 1895. Translations were also made by R. Y. Ebied, M. J. L. Young and Isya Joseph. Joseph stated that his translation was made from the original Kurdish book, which he had discovered. Alphonse Mingana asserted in 1916 that all hitherto translations were based on inauthentic documents. He moreover states that Shamir could have been the author of the Yazidi Book of Revelation.

Yazidis themselves knew of the books before Western interest began in the 1850s, though the vast majority of them had never seen them.

== Content ==
The book is written in first-person narrative with a narrator who speaks as a supreme being. The book begins with a short introduction, which is followed by five chapters.
