= Sultan Ezid =

Yazidi divine figure

Siltan Êzîd
- Lord of the Cup
- Member of the Divine Triad, with Tawûsî Melek and Sheikh Adi
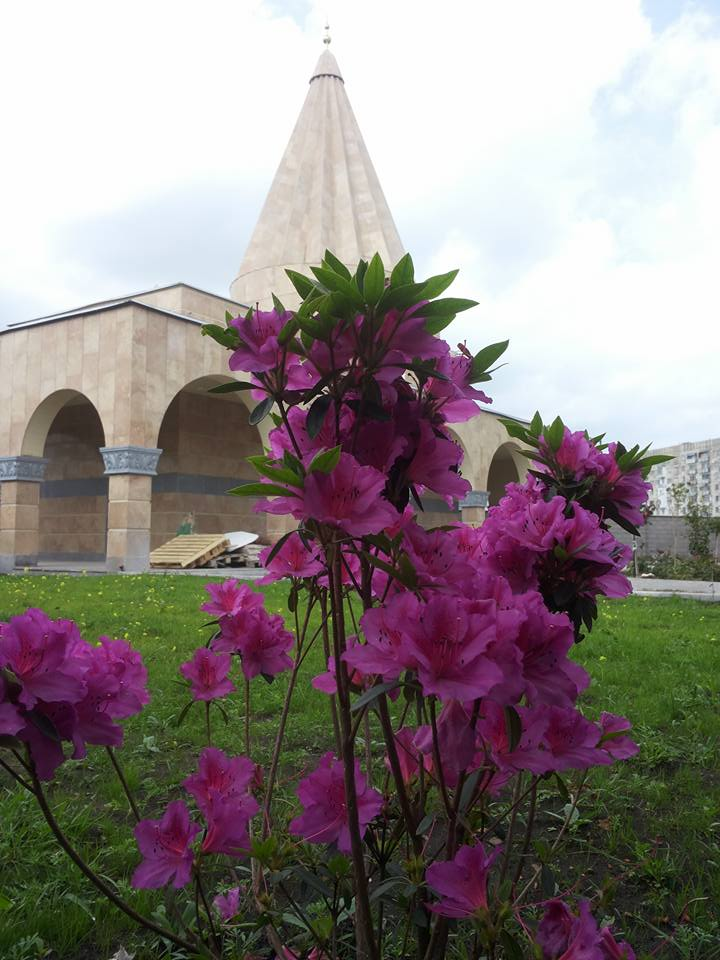
- Sultan Ezid Temple in Tbilisi, Georgia
- Other names: Êzî, Siltan Êzîd, Êzîdê Sor ("Ezid the Red")
- Yazidi script: 𐺑𐺠𐺕𐺀𐺢 𐺀𐺩𐺏𐺨𐺋
- Venerated in: Yazidism; Harranian paganism (proposed)
- Abode: The fourteen spheres of the universe
- Symbols: Atqat ("sincere faith"); The Cup ("kas"); The Crown ("tanc"); Wine ("mêy/şerab"); Xerqe; The Pen of Power ("Qelema Qudretê")
- Colour: Red
- Ethnic group: Yazidis
- Festivals: Feast of Ezid

Equivalents
- Greek: Dionysus
- Historical: Yazid ibn Muawiya

Siltan Êzîd (or sometimes Êzî or Êzîdê Sor) is a divine figure in the Yazidi religion, appearing as one of the three principal hypostases of God together with Tawûsî Melek and Sheikh Adi.

== Origin ==
=== Proposed Sabian Harranian roots ===
Siltan Ezi is one of the three principal manifestations of God in Yazidism, alongside Tawûsî Melek and Sheikh Adi ibn Musafir; Yazidi tradition identifies his earthly incarnation with Yazid ibn Mu'awiya, the second Umayyad caliph (r. 680–683). Sheikh Adi himself is said to have descended from the Umayyad line through Abu Sufyan, and the dynasty's ties to Upper Mesopotamia ran deep: Marwan II, Adi's own ancestor, made Harran his imperial capital, and a 13th-century Syriac chronicle from Edessa records that the people of Harran fought alongside Mu'awiya against Ali and, on that basis, "honoured Yazid, the son of Mu'awiya." At the time, Harran remained a stronghold of the pre-Islamic Harranian religion, a planetary, sun-centred cult steeped in Hellenistic philosophy that resisted both Christianization and Islamization into the 11th century and Theophilus, a Christian of Edessa, reported that Marwan II was a pagan who "belonged to the heresy of the Epicureans, that is, Automatists, an impiety he had imbued from the pagans who dwell at Harran." The scholar Artur Rodziewicz reads the Harranite chronicle as a possible trace of a specifically religious veneration of Yazid ibn Mu'awiya already current among the pagan Harranian Sabians, situating the roots of his cult in this milieu rather than treating it as a purely later Yazidi innovation.

=== Muslim perspective and heresiographical accounts ===
The tenth-century Arab geographer al-Muqaddasi reported encountering, in Isfahan, followers of Caliph Mu'awiya who regarded him as a prophet. Rodziewicz notes that this special status accorded to the Umayyads more broadly may connect to their own use of the title khalifat Allah ("Caliph of God"), rather than the more conventional khalifat rasul Allah ("successor of the Prophet"), which some historians have read as reflecting a self-understanding as God's deputies rather than merely the Prophet's political successors. Following the Abbasid overthrow of the Umayyad dynasty, some of its descendants took refuge in the Hakkari mountains, where they were received with respect among local Kurds.

The Arab biographer Abu Sa'd 'Abd al-Karim al-Sam'ani (d. 1166), a contemporary of Sheikh Adi, wrote in his biographical dictionary Kitab al-Ansab of encountering an ascetic community in the mountains of Hulwan and in the vicinity of a place he calls "al-Yazid," who lived apart from other people and held Yazid ibn Mu'awiya to have been righteous.

In a fragment of a creed (aqidah) attributed to Sheikh Adi, Sheikh Adi defends Yazid ibn Mu'awiya as a legitimate imam and caliph who fought against unbelievers, denies any connection between Yazid and the killing of Husayn ibn Ali, and pronounces a curse on anyone who defames him, but does not describe Yazid in divine terms. On this basis, Rodziewicz states that it remains uncertain whether Sheikh Adi himself regarded Yazid as an incarnation of God, or whether this belief was introduced afterward by a later leader of the community.

Writing in 1324, the Muslim author Abu Firas 'Abd Allah ibn Shibl reported information he had gathered from Sunni informants in the Euphrates region concerning a group he referred to as the "ignorant Adawite Yazidis," describing them as having come to revere Yazid to an extreme degree and as having abandoned Friday communal prayer; he identified Hasan ibn Adi as the figure most associated with this development. The theologian Ibn Taymiyya (d. 1328), who wrote a polemical piece condemning the Yazidi community, and his contemporary Abu'l-Firas Ubaisallah likewise held the view that it was this same Hasan ibn Adi (b. 1195), a figure later venerated within the Yazidi tradition itself as "Sheikh Hasan" and identified with one of the Seven Angels, who altered Sheikh Adi's teaching and transformed respect for Caliph Yazid into outright deification, in a manner these theologians regarded as a departure from what they considered Sheikh Adi's own orthodox position.

=== Proposed Iranian root ===
An alternative derivation traces the name not to the caliph but to the pre-Islamic Iranian root izad, Avestan yazata, Sanskrit yajata, Pahlavi yazd, surviving in modern Persian and Kurdish Yezdan/Êzdan ("God," "Creator"), the term for a class of divine helper-spirits in ancient Iranian belief. On this reading, "Êzî" and, by extension, the name of the religion itself derive from this older divine title rather than from the historical caliph.

== Significance and role ==
In Yazidi theology, the primordial, eternal God manifests in various images, hypostases and faces, the three principal ones being Siltan Êzîd, the supreme divine hypostasis; Tawûsî Melek, the Peacock Angel who became supreme ruler of the angels in the course of creation; and Sheikh Adi, the divine person who became incarnate in human history. The three are understood as inseparable, as articulated in the Qewlê Keniya Mara (Hymn of the Laughter of Snakes):

"Şîxadî û Tawûsî Melek û Siltan Êzî êkin,

Hûn me'niya jêk nekin"

"Sheikh Adi, Tawûsî Melek, Sultan Êzî are one; do not regard them as separate."

He also carries the epithet "Ezid the Red" (Êzîdê Sor), tied to the ritual and symbolic importance of the colour red in Yazidi observance, and is described as ruler of the fourteen spheres of the universe.

=== Divine hierarchy and the Seven Angels ===
Beneath the three principal hypostases, Yazidi theology also holds that seven Angels emanated ("were irradiated") from God as further, subordinate manifestations of the divine; at this early stage of creation the distinction between divine unity and multiplicity is only just emerging, and though the seven Angels are essentially inseparable from God and from one another, they are nonetheless depicted conversing among themselves and posing questions to Siltan Êzîd.

This structure is described through the paired concepts of batin ("hidden," esoteric) and dahir ("manifest," visible to ordinary perception): the "Hidden Council" (Dîwana Batinî) formed by the seven Angels in the unseen world is said to manifest on Earth as the "Manifest Council" (Dîwana Dahirî), a body of seven renowned holy sages, each the earthly hypostasis of one of the Angels and Sheikh Adi stands at the head of this council, whose other members are Şêxisin, Şêxûbekir, Fexredîn, Şêşims, Sicadîn, and Nasirdîn. In their hidden (batin) aspect, two hypostases of the Creator carry the title pîr, specifically "pîr of all pîrs," meaning master or creator, Tawûsî Melek in the Qewlê Çarşemê and Siltan Êzîd in the Qewlê Qerefurqan, while Sheikh Adi, the third hypostasis, already appears in the manifest world in the more familiar role of sheikh-sage.

=== Cosmogonic role ===
In Yazidi hymns, Siltan Êzîd, Sheikh Adi, Tawûsî Melek, and God are repeatedly described performing distinct acts in the creation narrative even though Yazidi theology holds them to be one and the same essence. This is reconciled through the concept of the surr, variously translated as "mystery," "essence," or "innermost self", a single divine essence transmitted in stages from the Creator down to the world: Sheikh Adi is described as light from the light of Êzîd, Êzîd as light from the light of Tawûsî Melek, and Tawûsî Melek as light from the light of God.

Two hymns describe Siltan Êzîd as the one who extracts the Pearl from which the world is made. In the Hymn of the Black Furqan (Qewlê Qerefurqan), he puts his hand into the "Lamp of Power" ("Qendîla Qudretê'') and takes out the pearl, which he then places on Sheikh Adi's palm; Sheikh Adi in turn fashions from it the crown, the cilice, and the luminous Xerqes. Likewise, in the Hymn of the Faith (Qewlê Îmanê), Siltan Êzîd takes the pearl ("durr") out of the ocean and places it on Sheikh Adi's palm, who fashions from it the crown, the cilice, and "the luminous black Xerqe."

A further verse has Siltan Êzîd himself donning the Xerqe and placing "a luminous black crown of power" on his own head, The Xerqe is the primordial luminous covering of God, comparable to concepts such as the Zoroastrian xwarenah; as God was originally dressed in light or concealed within the luminous Pearl, which was itself his Xerqe, the Yazidi feqir dons his own woollen Xerqe in imitation of God. Since the beginning of the world it has passed from master to apprentice in an unbroken chain: from the first four Angels, to further angels, to Adam, and then successively to "Ezid the Red" and Sheikh Adi, who transmitted it to the Yazidi feqîrs. Alongside the crown, Sultan Êzîd is also described as holding "the Pen of power" (Qelema Qudretê) in his hand, an insignia of royal, mystical and creative power (the Crown and the Pen), alongside Sheikh Adi in the earliest stages of the cosmogony.

The Qewlê Zebûnî Meksûr narrates the moment the Pearl broke open: the primordial Lamp descended from above accompanied by Love, at which the "Padishah opened His eye," and water poured from the Pearl to form the sea. The expression of the eye opening is understood as the moment of the appearance of the second sea and the second Lamp/Throne, which in turn, indicates the emergence of corporeality/materiality, i.e. the four elements of the future visible world, and among them the highest element, fire.

The same hymn associates this moment with the emergence of a "branch of Love" (şaxa mihbetê) growing out of the Padishah, after which the "Lovers", understood as the Angels, or as Sheikh Adi and Sultan Yezid themselves, took "Love and the Cup" from him; the Padishah is then said to have "established the Limit and the Law" from that stage, in the company of the Cup and Love. Elsewhere the hymns record that "the Pearl waved, there was an ocean," at which point Sultan Êzîd "entrusted this world to the hands" of Melik Şemsedîn and Melik Fexredîn, the angelic manifestations of the sun and moon, marking the shift from the formal to the material stage of creation.

Siltan Êzîd's cosmogonic role extends to the animation of Adam. After Love strikes Adam's head and the Spirit enters his body, Adam drinks from the Cup and comes to life; the appearance of "the mercy of the Lord of the Cup" at this moment is read as referring to both Love and Siltan Êzîd, both of whom carry that title, after which holy men and angels take Adam to Paradise. Yazidis who follow Sheikh Adi and Siltan Êzîd are themselves described in the Hymn of the Faith (Qewlê Îmanê) as divers ("xewas") and pearl-hunters, bringing forth pearls from the "mighty ocean" of Sheikh Adi's faith.

=== The Lord of the Cup and the Dionysian motif ===
Siltan Êzîd holds the recurring title "Lord of the Cup" (Siltan Êzî xudanê kasê), reflecting his place in a mystical initiation narrative in which he and the angels first drink from a cup of wine, which is then passed down through Sheikh Adi and a chain of holy men until it reaches 366 mystics. In the Story of the Appearance of the Sur of Ezi (Çîroka Pêdabûna Sura Êzî), parts of which are also embedded within the Great Hymn (Qewlê Mezin), Siltan Êzîd plays the role of Dionysus. He gathers his followers in a tent inside a fortress at the centre of the sea, where wine circulates and the assembly sings in his honour, a scene compared structurally to the ancient Greek myth of Dionysus in Euripides' Bacchae, an unrecognised god who draws his followers into ecstatic, wine-induced devotion. This motif intersects with the historical reputation of Yazid ibn Mu'awiya, remembered in Arabic sources as a patron of music and wine at court, a detail that lines up suggestively with his sacralised role in Yazidi tradition.

=== Personification of "Atqat" ===
In Yazidism, the concept of faith is composed of three components, the dîn ("religion"), î'tîqad/atqat ("belief"), which refers to sincere, heartfelt belief, and îman ("faith"), which refers to unwavering belief and conviction, each of which is personified through holy figures: dîn as Sherfedin, atqat as Siltan Êzîd, and îman as Tawûsî Melek. All three are held to share a single essence (surr) and together constitute the Yazidi faith.

=== Liturgical role ===
Siltan Êzîd is invoked directly in Yazidi ritual practice. In the Morkirin baptismal rite performed at Kaniya Spî (the White Spring) in Lalish, the officiant declares over the initiate that their testimony and faith are pledged "in the name of Tawûsî Melek and Siltan Êzî," marking baptism as an act of formal incorporation into the community under both figures jointly.

=== Legendary appearances ===
Yazidi hagiography presents Siltan Êzîd appearing in disguise before his incarnation as Sheikh Adi is recognised. In one account he appears in a dream to the boatman Ababakr, telling him that he will visit in another form under the name Şîxadî, and that Ababakr will fail to recognise him and refuse him passage across the river a prophecy that comes to pass exactly as foretold.
