= Sakhr Abu l-Barakat =

Yazidi saint

Sheikh Sakhr Abu l-Barakat
- Died: 1221
- Era: Late Abbasid era
- Predecessor: Sheikh Adi ibn Musafir
- Successor: Al-Hasan ibn Adi
- Relatives: Sheikh Adi ibn Musafir (uncle)

Sheikh Sakhr Abu l-Barakat, was the nephew and successor of Sheikh Adi ibn Musafir, around whom the ‘Adawiyya order had formed. When ‘Adī died without a son, Sakhr replaced him. He was executed on the orders of Gökböri in 1221-1222 due to the fact that his practises were seen as too "heretic" and he had gained a cult-like following in Kurdistan. He was succeeded by his eldest son Al-Hasan Ibn Adi.

== Succession ==
Sakhr Abu l-Barakat Yezidi Notables
Preceded by Sheikh Adi ibn Musafir	Sheikh of the ‘Adawiyya Order	Succeeded by Al-Hasan ibn Adi
