= Feast of Ezid =

Yazidi festival

Cejna Êzîd (Eyda Êzîd)
- Observed by: Yazidis
- Type: Religious
- Date: The last Friday before the 21st of December
- Frequency: Annual

Feast of Ezid (Kurdish: Cejna Êzî/Êzîd or Eyda Êzî/Êzid) is a Yezidi festival that commemorates Sultan Ezid.

== Rojiyên Êzî ==
The Feast of Ezid is preceded by Rojiyên Êzî (The fasts of Ezid), which are the three days of fasting in honor of Êzî/Êzîd—one of the names of God and also considered to be the name of God's earthly manifestation in Yazidism. Êzî(d) is one of the names of God and at the same time namesake of the Yezidis (Êzidî). The name Êzidî therefore means “Follower of God”. Unlike the fasting days of Rojiyên Sêşims and Rojiyên Xwudan during the preceding weeks, the three fasting days of Rojiyên Êzid are compulsory for every Yezidi with exception of children, the sick and elderly. The fastings begin on Tuesday and end on Thursday, starting after sunrise and ending after sunset each day. On the fourth day (Friday), the Feast of Ezid (“Îda/Eida Êzîd”) is celebrated.

== Winter solstice ==
This festival takes place on the Friday before winter solstice, it marks a turning point in the solar cycle. As the days get longer after the winter solstice, believers believe that the Sun is being reborn. The winter solstice is also associated with the appearance of divine figures. The Yazidis associate winter solstice with the appearance of Sultan Ezid, an important religious figure who is considered as God's earthly manifestation.

== Sources ==
- Yezidis Russia
