= Ibn al-Mustawfi =

Kurdish historian and poet

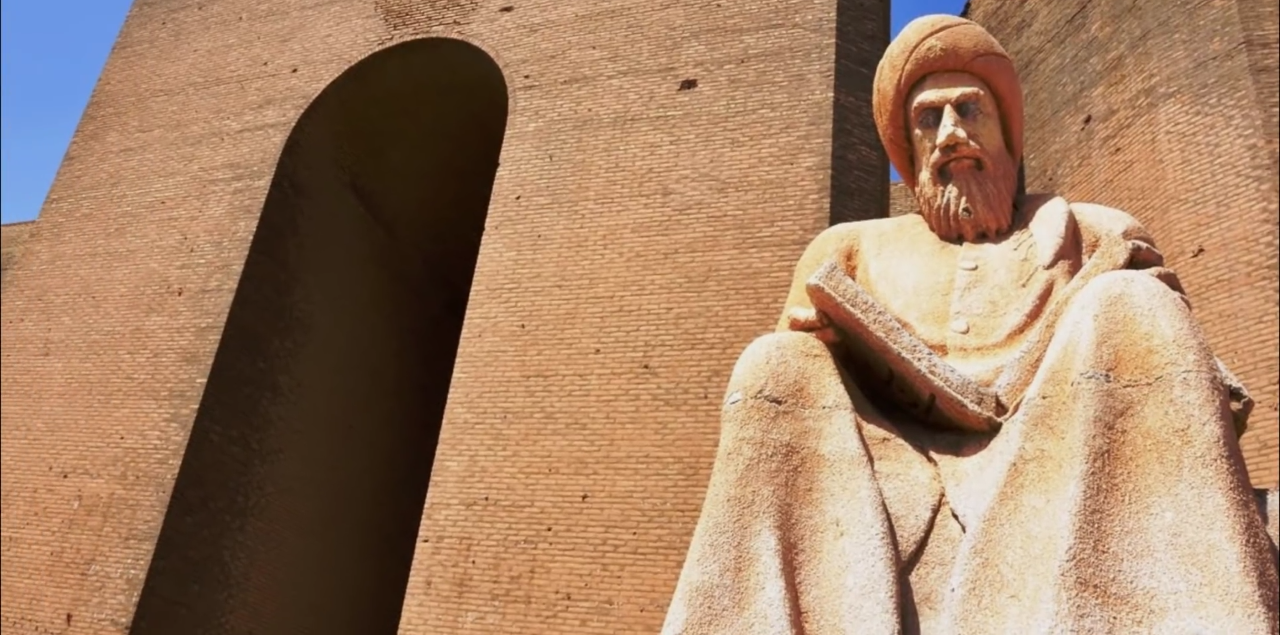
Statue of Ibn Al-Mustawfi in Erbil, Kurdistan Region, Iraq.

Mubarak Ibn Ahmad Sharaf al-Din Ibn al-Mustawfi al-Lakhmi al-Irbili (Arabic: مبارك بن أحمد شرف الدين اللخمي الإربيلي, b. 1169 – d. 1239), a famous Muslim historian of Erbil, who was born in the ancient citadel of Erbil. He wrote in several areas, history, literature and language. His masterpiece is a four volume book on the history of Erbil.

== Biography ==
Al-Mustawfi was born in the citadel of Erbil and grew up in the house of leadership and science. His father and uncle were his teachers when he began his education, and his father encouraged him to go to the scholars of Erbil to continue his education. He studied rhetoric and learned everything related to it. He was also interested in language and literature.

Al-Mustawfi was a poet and minister in Erbil, the vizier of Muzaffar ad-Din Gökböri, the governor of Erbil in the reign of Sultan Saladin, and subsequently the independent ruler of Erbil.

In the year 1236, after the death of Gökböri, Ibn al-Mustawfi moved to Mosul following the Mongol sacking of Erbil, and lived there until his death in 1239.

== List of works ==
- Tārīkh Irbil: al-musammā Nabāhat al-balad al-Khāmil bi-man waradahu min al-amāthil, four volumes.
- Kitab al-Nizam fi shi'ar al-Mutanabbi wa abi Tammam, ten volumes.
- Kitab ithbat al-muhasaal fi nisbet abyat al-mufasaal, two volumes.
- Kitab sr al-Sanaah
- Kitab aba qimash, a collection a lot of literature and anecdotes.
- Kitab Ahkam al-Nijoom
- He also wrote a collection of poems.

== See also ==
- List of Kurdish philosophers
