= Sheikh Adi ibn Musafir =

Yazidi saint

The Universal Sheikh, Sheikh of All (Sheikh al-'Am) Sheikh Adi
- Şîxadî, شیخادی
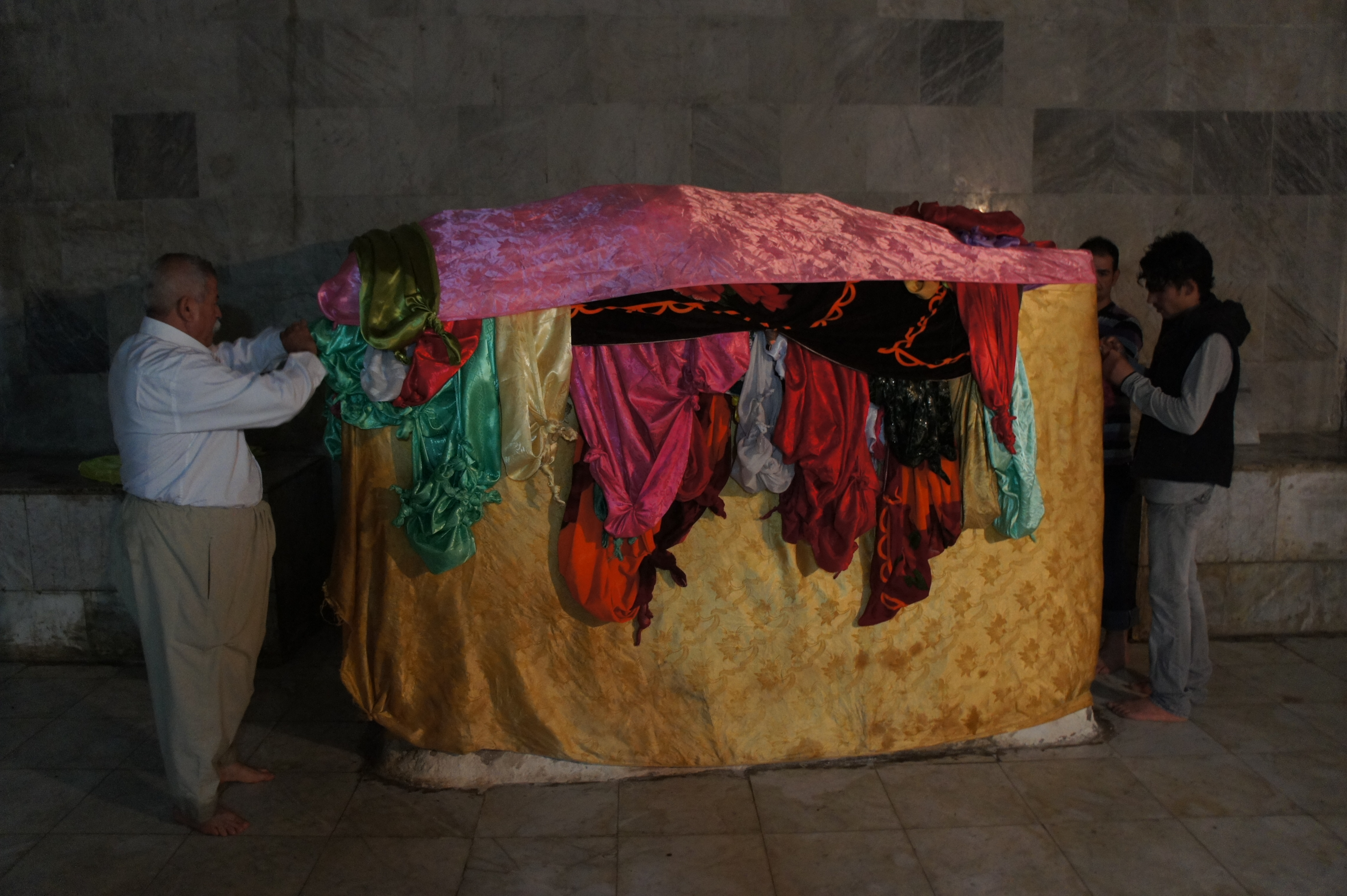
- The sarcophagus of Sheikh Adi
- Born: 1072/1078; Bait Far, Baalbek (present-day Beqaa Valley, Lebanon)
- Died: 1162; Lalish
- Resting place: Lalish, Iraq
- Occupations: Religious leader, mystic, theologian
- Known for: Central saint of Yazidism
- Successor: Sakhr Abu l-Barakat
- Father: Sheikh Musafir
- Family: Adanî

Sheikh Adi ibn Musafir (Kurdish: شیخادی, romanized: Şîxadî, Arabic: شيخ عدي; born 1072/1078, died 1162) was a 12th-century mystic, ascetic and theologian who is the central saint in the Yazidi religion, considered as the reformer, renewer or founder of Yazidism. His tomb at Lalish, Iraq is the holiest site in Yazidism and the focal point of annual Yazidi pilgrimage. In Yazidi belief, Sheikh Adi is venerated as an earthly incarnation of God. His own writings, preserved in the oldest surviving Yazidi documents (mişûrs) dating to the 13th century and highly revered by Yazidis, express a pantheistic self-understanding and self-identification as God: "In the secret of my knowledge there is no God but me."

Sheikh Adi's religious background is a subject of active debate. Islamic literature and Western scholarship traditionally describe him as a Sufi mystic of Islamic background who gathered followers known as the Adawiyya. Some scholars dispute this Islamic framing, arguing that if Sheikh Adi had been an Arab Muslim Sufi, he could not so easily have gained prestige and a following across the region, as reported by Ibn Khallikan, without meeting notable resistance, unless his teachings connected with a spiritual tradition already held by the local population. Yazidis themselves reject any claim of an Islamic background. The name Adawiyya ("Sheikh Adi's people"), which is also used to refer to the Yazidi religion, refers to those who follow Sheikh Adi's mystic and spiritual path. The name is not used by Yazidis and is unknown within the Yazidi community, though it is used in Yazidi sacred hymns as a self-designation for Yazidis.

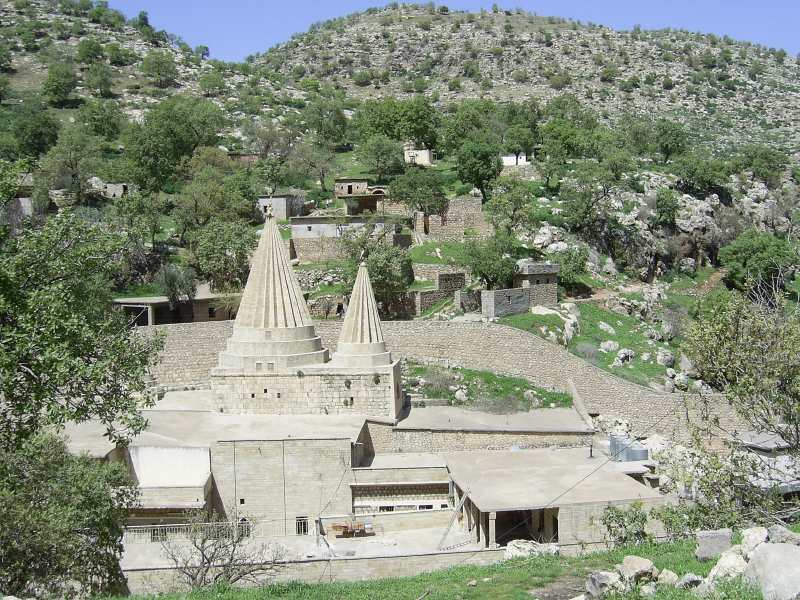
Shrine of Sheikh 'Adi in the Valley of Lalish.

== Biography ==
=== Early life ===
Sheikh Adi was born in the 1070s in the village of Bait Far, near Baalbek, in the Beqaa Valley of present-day Lebanon. The village is situated in a region identified in medieval Arabic geographical sources as Shuf al-Akrad, (lit. "Shuf of the Kurds"), a designation recorded by the Muslim historian Ibn al-Mustawfi (1169–1239), who preserves an account on the authority of Sheikh Adi's own nephew placing his birth there. Sheikh Adi's full name is recorded as Sharaf al-Din Abu al-Fadl Adi ibn Musafir ibn Ismail Musa ibn Marwan.

His life and activity coincided with the era of the Crusades, a period in which theological thought across the Near East was flourishing, various mystical currents and schools were developing, and the political landscape was deeply unsettled, with the Abbasid caliphate in Baghdad in conflict with the Fatimid caliphate in Egypt while Crusader forces advanced toward the Levant. This context gave new impetus to the revival of ancient mystical traditions under the guise of dervish brotherhoods. Yazidi tradition distinguishes two figures named Sheikh Adi: the first is Sheikh Adi ibn Musafir, who came from the Levant and remained in Lalish; the second is his grandnephew Sheikh Adi ibn Abu'l Barakat, who together with other Yazidi preachers spread the teaching of his ancestor. Yazidi sacred texts are focused on Sheikh Adi ibn Musafir.

In Yazidism, Sheikh Adi's birth is described as a moment of divine significance and Yazidis use the term "revealed himself" rather than "was born" to describe his coming into the world, in reflection of the Yazidi belief that Sheikh Adi is an incarnation of God. Thus, his birthplace of Bait Far is described in Yazidi sacred texts as the place "where Sheikh Adi revealed himself." Yazidi tradition understands Sheikh Adi's life as the earthly manifestation of a divine being, who arrived in the world already bearing divine essence ("surr").

The hymn of Qasīdā Safā Waqtī (The Time of Mine Has Been Purified) preserves an account of Sheikh Adi's miraculous birth and opens with Sheikh Adi's own words: "My time has been purified, and I reached the highest level / Even in the womb, I was brought up / My true Sheikh came to my rescue." It continues: "In this house I am blessing and surr" and "When I was born, forty men of perfect men were with me". The term surr carries specific meaning in Yazidi religious usage: the power of God, divine magic, or secret thought.

A story about Sheikh Adi's miraculous birth is preserved in Yazidi tradition and Arabic hagiographic works. In the Yazidi version, the account begins with Sheikh Adi's father, Musafir, who lived in Baalbek with his family. The angel Jibrail appeared to him in a dream and told him to go to the mountain of Baalbek and spend time there in prayer and devotion, after which God would reveal Himself in his family. Sheikh Musafir went to a cave on the mountain and remained there for a long time in prayer. When he returned home and knocked at the door, his wife did not open it. She said to him: "Go to the hill and spend the night there until morning, so that the people of Sham do not judge wrongly, that she received a stranger at night. And if you have spent many years in prayer and awaiting a divine sign, then a sign you must receive."

Sheikh Musafir went to the hill and asked God for a sign. By God's will he called out: "I, Sheikh Musafir of Sham, have spent a long time in a cave in prayer and devotion, and in my family God will manifest Himself." The people of the neighborhood gathered before his house to bow before him and congratulate him. The divine essence, surr, descended upon the wife of Musafir and she conceived.

Six months into the pregnancy, two holy men, Sheikh Aqil and Sheikh Muslim learned that God was about to manifest Himself. They came to Baalbek and saw at a spring a woman spinning wool. Sheikh Aqil said to Sheikh Muslim: "Look at this woman. When she inhales and exhales, a radiance appears and disappears from her mouth and around her head. I am certain that this is the surr of God within her." In the Yazidi version of the tradition, the two holy men greeted the woman but she did not respond and turned away. The two holy men understood that the surr had not yet fully manifested. After three months, Sheikh Adi revealed himself, completing a nine-month gestation of divine significance.

When Sheikh Adi was seven years old, children were playing a ball game in the Levant known as kasho, a game similar to polo. Sheikh Adi was the most skilled among them. Sheikh Aqil and Sheikh Muslim were watching from the field when one of the players seized the ball and cried out: "Hola hola Sultan Ezida!" ("Glory, glory to Sultan Ezid!"). Sheikh Aqil said to Sheikh Muslim: "That is him!" They approached the child and greeted him. He answered their greeting three times. They asked why three times. He replied: "The first greeting I gave because I could not respond from my mother's womb. The second I now give on behalf of my mother, who could not answer when you greeted her. The third I give now."

A version of the same narrative is recorded in Qalāʾid al-Jawāhir, an Arabic hagiographic work on Sheikh Abd al-Qadir al-Gilani, who was Sheikh Adi's contemporary and associate, which records: his father Musafir spent forty years in the forest, after which a voice in a dream told him to return to his wife, for "God will give you a saint and he will become famous." When Sheikh Adi's mother was pregnant, two Sufi masters, Sheikh Muslim and Sheikh Aqil, passed her near a spring. Sheikh Muslim said to Sheikh Aqil: "A shining light comes from the belly of this woman and reaches heaven", declaring: "This is our son Adi! Let us greet him!" and greeted the unborn child "Greetings to you, oh ʿAdī! Greetings, O holy God!". When he was seven years old they returned and greeted him, and he answered their greeting three times. When asked why three times, he replied once for the present greeting and twice for the greetings they had offered him while he was still unborn, and that only out of respect for Jesus son of Mary did he not answer from the womb. When he had grown up, he heard a voice in a dream: "Get up, ʿAdī, go to Lalish, that is your place. And God will revive many dead hearts with your hands."

=== Ancestry & Lineage ===
The genealogy and ethnic origins of Sheikh Adi have been a matter of scholarly dispute since the medieval period, with Islamic sources, Yazidi sources, and modern scholarship offering differing and sometimes contradictory accounts.

==== Ethnicity ====
Western scholarship widely identifies Sheikh Adi as being an Arab of Umayyad ancestry. Birgül Açikyildiz describes Sheikh Adi as "an Arab from the Umayyad dynasty with Kurdish blood running in his veins". This identification has, however, been disputed by other scholars.

Regarding his ethnicity, according to Adnan Zeyan Farhan and Qader Saleem Shamo, Kurdish and Orientalist scholars "generally agree" that Sheikh Adi was Kurdish in origin, and that his ancestors came from the Hakkari mountains, identified in the sources as Jabal Dasin. The Kurdish historian Anwar al-Mawi records that Sheikh Adi's ancestors were forced to leave the Hakkari mountains and take refuge in the Levant, and other Yazidi researchers support this position with the argument that if his ancestors had not been from that region, its population would not have gathered around him upon his arrival at Lalish in such great numbers and with such eagerness, nor would he have been given the title al-Hakkari.

Ibn al-Mustawfi al-Arbili, drawing on contemporary sources, believed Sheikh Adi was "from the Kurds of the Levant," drawing on the account of Sheikh Adi's own nephew that his home village of Bayt al-Far was located in a region of the Levant known as Shuf al-Akrad, meaning "Shuf of the Kurds" in Arabic.

Farhan and Shamo further note that some medieval sources record that Sheikh Adi spoke Kurdish, and that most of the historians who personally witnessed, saw, or met him, including Ibn Khallikan, Ibn al-Mustawfi al-Arbili, Muzaffar al-Din al-Arbili, and Ibn al-Arabi, confirm his Kurdish origin.

The biographer al-Safadi (1296–1363) refers to Sheikh Adi as al-Kurdi while also noting his Hakkari nisba and Levantine birthplace. Ibn Kathir (1300–1374) traces his lineage as "Sheikh Adi bin Musafir bin Ismail bin Musa bin Marwan bin Al-Hasan bin Marwan al-Hakkari," connecting him to the Hakkari.

A 14th-century Persian biographical source by the medieval historian and genealogist Ibn Enbah, Al-Fusul al-Fakhriyya, lists Sheikh Adi explicitly among notable Kurdish figures alongside other prominent Kurds of the era and describes him as being from the Hakkari region. His Kurdish lineage is also corroborated by the historian Ismail Pasha al-Baghdadi in his book Clarifying the Hidden (in Arabic).

A hagiographic account in Qalāʾid al-Jawāhir, a biography of Sheikh Adi's contemporary and associate Abdul Qadir Gilani, records an episode in which Sheikh Adi is said to have relieved the suffering of a deceased man through prayer. According to the account, after the man's torment had ceased, Sheikh Adi approached the grave and addressed him in Kurdish, asking, "O Husain, khoshā khoshā?" ("Are you well?"). The man replied from within the grave that he was well and that the torment had been lifted from him.

Al-Dhahabi (1274–1348), in his Siyar Aʿlam al-Nubalāʾ, identifies Sheikh Hasan, son of Sheikh Adi's grandnephew, with the nisba of al-Kurdi as Ibn Adi Hassan bin Adi bin Abi al-Barakat al-Kurdi.

==== Umayyad lineage ====
Of the twenty-five medieval Islamic writers surveyed in modern scholarship covering the medieval through early modern period, only five attribute Umayyad ancestry to Sheikh Adi, all of whom wrote centuries after his death. The earliest historian to introduce the Umayyad designation was al-Shatnufi (died 1314), followed by al-Maqrizi (died 1441), Ibn Taghribirdi (died 1470), al-Tadafi al-Hanbali (died 1565), and al-Sha'rani (died 1565).

Sheikh Adi is said to have descended from the Umayyad line through Abu Sufyan, and the dynasty's ties to Upper Mesopotamia ran deep: Marwan II, Adi's own ancestor, made Harran his imperial capital, and a 13th-century Syriac chronicle from Edessa records that the people of Harran fought alongside Mu'awiya against Ali and, on that basis, "honoured Yazid, the son of Mu'awiya." At the time, Harran remained a stronghold of the pagan pre-Islamic Harranian religion, a planetary, sun-centred cult steeped in Hellenistic philosophy that resisted both Christianization and Islamization into the 11th century, and Theophilus, a Christian of Edessa, reported that Marwan II was a pagan who "belonged to the heresy of the Epicureans, that is, Automatists, an impiety he had imbued from the pagans who dwell at Harran." Sultan Ezid is one of the three principal manifestations of God in Yazidism, alongside Tawûsî Melek and Sheikh Adi; Yazidi tradition identifies his earthly incarnation with Yazid ibn Mu'awiya, the second Umayyad caliph (r. 680–683). Rodziewicz reads the Harranite chronicle as a possible trace of a specifically religious veneration of Yazid ibn Mu'awiya already current among the pagan Harranian Sabians, situating the roots of his cult in this milieu rather than treating it as a purely later Yazidi innovation.

Some Yazidi, Christian, and Muslim sources trace a direct genealogical connection between Harran and Sheikh Adi ibn Musafir. An anonymous nineteenth-century manuscript, The History of the Yezidis in Mosul and Environs, records that Adi "came and dwelt in Mount Lalish, near the city of Mosul... Some say he was of the people of Harran, and related to Marwan ibn al-Hakam." Rodziewicz notes that the reading is not entirely secure, since some manuscript copies give "people of Hawran," a different region, instead of "people of Harran." He nonetheless considers the Harran reading plausible rather than a simple error.

One of the oldest surviving Yazidi written sources, the manuscript Mišūr of P'īr Sīnī Bahrī (dated 604 AH / 1207–1208 CE), gives his lineage as: "Sheikh Adi b. Musafir b. Zayn al-Din b. Ismail b. Utuba b. Umaya b. Yazid b. Muʿawiya b. Abu Sufyan," tracing his descent to Abu Sufyan, described by Rodziewicz as "the head of the Umayyads, a famous Meccan leader of those Quraysh who opposed Muhammad and Islam." This connection to Abu Sufyan and the Quraysh is understood in Yazidi tradition not as an Islamic genealogy but as a link to pre-Islamic Mecca and its traditions. This genealogical chain is structurally distinct from all Islamic biographical sources. When the Yazidi Supreme Spiritual Council in Lalish blessed a new authoritative copy of this mišūr, the genealogical passage was relocated to a footnote with an explanatory note that, according to Arab sources, Sheikh Adi belongs to the Marwanid branch of the Umayyad dynasty rather than being a direct descendant of Yazid ibn Muʿawiya.

==== Adanî clan ====
The caste of sheikhs in Yazidism is divided into three clans: the Adanî, the Qatanî, and the Şemsanî. The Adanî clan of sheikhs are directly descended from Sheikh Adi's line passed down through his brother. Marriages between these sub-castes are prohibited, as they are understood to be fraternally connected to one another by spiritual ties, making intermarriage equivalent to the sin of marrying a sibling.

The Adanî clan carries the direct spiritual inheritance of Sheikh Adi and supplies the senior religious offices of the Yazidi community. The Pêşîmamê Babê Şêx, the ceremonial escort of the clerical head of the Yazidis, is drawn specifically from the Şerfedîn clan, itself a branch of the Şêxisin sheikhs, who are a further division of the Adanî line. The Pêşîmamê Mergehê, who leads ceremonies and rituals, standing in front of other clerics during the feasts, is drawn from the Şêxisin sheikhs.

The Qatanî sub-caste traces its origin to Derwesh Adam, a disciple of Sheikh Adi, whose son Mir Birahim founded the ruling dynasty of the Sheikhan principality. The rulers of the Sheikhan principality hold the title of Mîr and derive their authority from their genealogical connection to Sheikh Adi ibn Musafir. The Mîr is regarded as the deputy of Sheikh Adi and the gates of the Lalish sanctuary bear the inscription identifying the Mir as "emir of Sheikhan and viceregent of Sheikh Adi".

=== Education & Sufi Connections ===
Sheikh Adi left Baalbek while still very young and traveled to Baghdad, where he became acquainted with the famous mystics and theologians of his time, some of whom left written testimonies about him. He remained unmarried throughout this period, lived ascetically, worked the land, fed himself from his own produce, and wove his own garments from cotton he grew himself.

Islamic historical sources and much of Western scholarship record that Sheikh Adi received his early religious education in the Levant, likely in Damascus, before travelling to Baghdad. The Baghdad intellectual environment of the early 12th century was one of intense mystical ferment. Sheikh Adi became acquainted with the most prominent mystics of the period, including Ahmad al-Ghazali, and moved in circles permeated by the ideas of Mansur al-Hallaj (858–922), whose teachings fused Greek philosophy with radical mystical positions and who had previously traveled to Kurdish territories, where he gained wide popularity among local tribes before being executed by Islamic authorities for heresy.

Scholars have identified the thought of Husayn ibn Mansur al-Hallaj (858–922 CE) as a significant intellectual thread in the environment from which Yazidism emerged. Hallaj, famous for his declaration Ana'l-Haqq ("I am the Truth") and executed for heresy by Muslim authorities, had previously traveled through Kurdish territories in the Kermanshah region, where he gained wide popularity among local tribes. Rodziewicz argues that it is probable that Sheikh Adi encountered Hallaj's ideas in Baghdad through his master Ahmad al-Ghazali, who promoted them, and that "inspired by the original thought of Hallaj and his missionary activity, Adi left Baghdad and went to the mountains of Kurdistan." Hallaj occupies a recognized place within the Yazidi sacred tradition: unlike figures such as Zoroaster or Ali ibn Abu Talib, he is counted among Yazidi holy men and is the subject of individual sacred hymns (Qewls), including Qewlê Husêyînî Helac and Qewlê Hellacê Mensûr.

Sheikh Adi's closest associate from his time in Baghdad was Abd al-Qadir Gilani. Gilani left a written testimony about Sheikh Adi: "If anyone could still become a prophet, it would be Sheikh Adi ibn Musafir, deserving of it by his earnest faith... All the signs of power over the saints were given to him when he was still in his mother's womb."

In Yazidi understanding, Sheikh Adi's relationship with the Sufi milieu of Baghdad is framed distinctly from its Islamic historiographic framing. Sheikh Adi is understood not as a Muslim mystic who operated within the Sufi institutional framework, but as a dervish in the pre-confessional sense of the term, a tradition understood to have developed from circles of non-confessional monotheism predating Islam, whose adherents "did not identify themselves with followers of any single specific religion." Sheikh Adi is accordingly understood not as a participant in an Islamic Sufi tradition but as a dervish who operated across religious boundaries and possessed knowledge in many religions. Yazidis in that era were not a closed community and the Yazidi community he drew around him consisted of people of diverse backgrounds whose worldview did not conform to the religion of the majority and therefore were periodically subjected to persecution and violence.

From the Yazidi perspective, dervishism, later designated by others as Sufism, was a supra-religious teaching that preceded and transcended the confessional boundaries of any single religion, having its roots in the pre-Islamic monotheistic tradition of the Hanifs, with whom the earliest dervishes identified themselves. The term "Sufism" is held in Yazidi tradition to be alien to Yazidi self-understanding, having become associated with mystical currents within the Muslim religion.

The distinction between Yazidi dervishism and institutional Sufism was articulated by Dimitri Pirbari, a Yazidi religious scholar, historian and spiritual leader of the Georgian Yazidis, in a 2016 interview:

"Yezidi religion is mysticism. Without mysticism, it does not exist. In prayer, we address God, Xwedê. In our understanding, God is everywhere and in everything. In the Yezidi religion there is a term—wahdat al-wujud—which later was extensively described by the well-known Sufi, Ibn Arabi. This concept previously functioned amongst the dervishes—"Unity of existence," i.e. God in everything. (…) Academically speaking, it could be called pantheism. (…) I believe that until Sufism was forced into the framework of Islam by al-Ghazali, it was a separate teaching of a gnostic and ascetic nature. They called themselves ascetics—derwesh. Later, a term tassawuf appeared. After some time, when some of the dervishes associated with the term tassawuf—Sufis—were recognised by the Islamic tarikats, i.e., "brotherhoods," the Yezidis did not agree to this. They became dervishes separately, outside the framework of any religion. (…) The thing is that the Yezidis, in fact dervishes—zahed—are ascetics, as they used to be called in the past, have great respect for the first greatest dervishes, such as Rabia al-Adawiyya, Zu al-Nun al-Misri, Hasan al-Basri, Bayazid Bastami, Junayd al-Baghdadi…"

The Mišūr of P'īr Sīnī Bahrī (1207–1208 CE), records Sheikh Adi's spiritual genealogy (silsila) tracing back through a chain of dervish masters to Salman Darani: "Sheikh Adi bin Musafir the Murid of Sheikh Aqil, and he is the Murid of Sheikh Salman, and he is the Murid of Sheikh Muhammad Qalansi, and he is the Murid of Sheikh Nasr, and he is the Murid of Sheikh Yusuf Fani, and they are Murids of Sheikh Omar Saidi, and he is the Murid of Sheikh Ali Zarbawi, and he is the Murid of Sheikh Alamain, and he is the Murid of Sheikh Jaqub, and he is the Murid of Salman Darani." According to Pirbari and Mossaki, who translated and analysed this manuscript, this silsila is absent from Yazidi oral and religious tradition, appearing only in the written mišūr documents, and Islamic terminology in the mišūrs was included as "a matter of political expedience," since these documents were presented to Muslim authorities and required "acceptable form" accordingly.

=== Arrival in Lalish ===
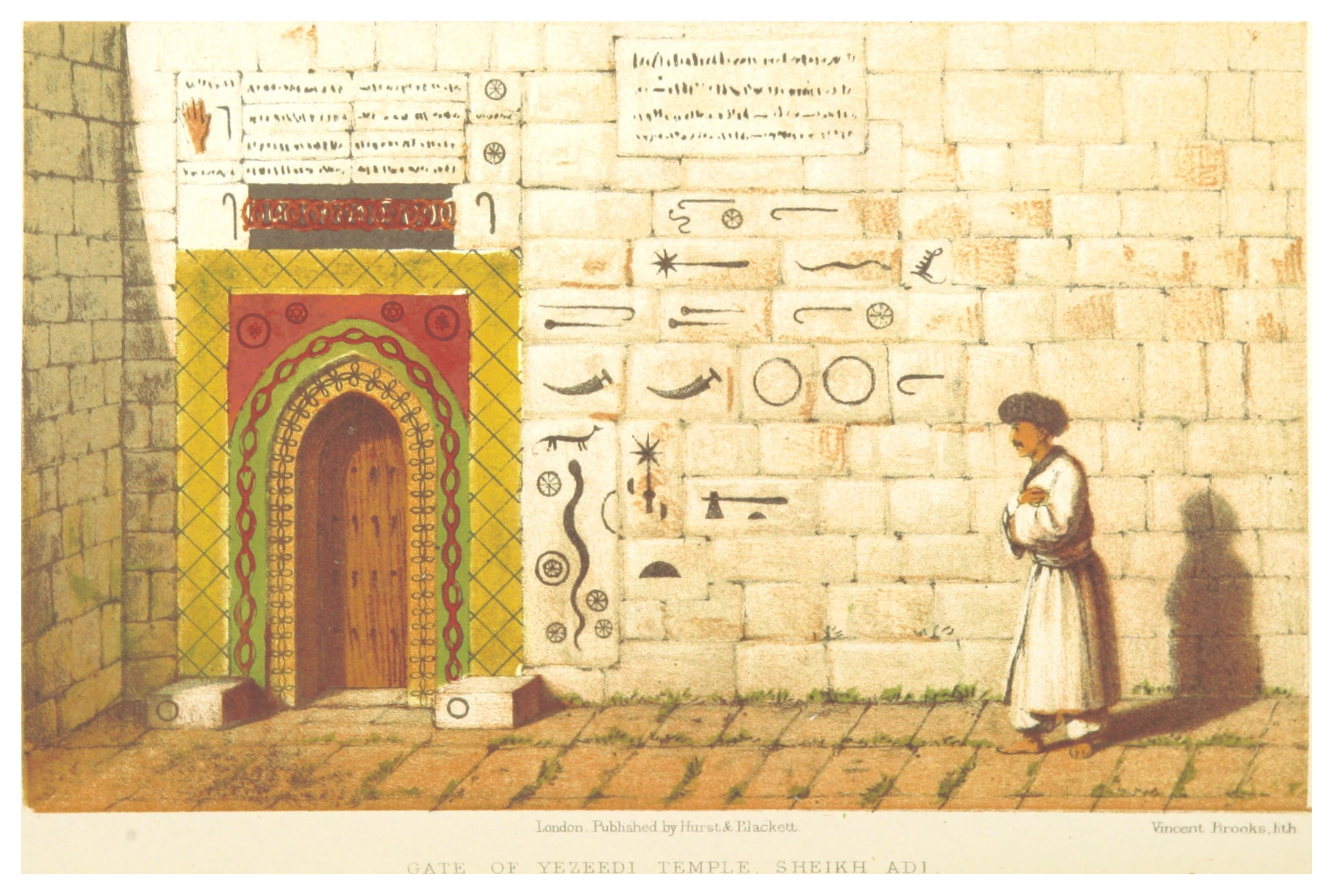
Gate of Sheikh Adi's shrine in Lalish

Around the age of thirty, Sheikh Adi departed for the Hakkari mountains of northern Iraq. Al-Dhahabi records that after his long journeys through Syria, the Hijaz and Iraq, Sheikh Adi received a vision in which he was told: "O Adi, go to Lalish, that is your place, and God by your hand will revive many dead souls."

According to a Christian manuscript preserved in a Chaldean monastery, before Sheikh Adi reached Lalish, his coming had already been foretold in the region. A blind man in the land of Marj, in the area known as Lower Dasin, had long foretold the coming of a great sheikh, repeating every single day that a great sheikh was drawing near and that his arrival was not far off. He declared that when the sheikh came, peace and security would fill the land and no person would be able to harm another. When people from the town asked him "who is this sheikh whose arrival you long to meet?", the blind man answered "the sign of his coming is that the sun will change color to several hues; green, saffron, yellow, red, and deep blue, accompanied by movements and portents in the sky." When these signs appeared, the people of the region gathered around the blind man, rejoicing greatly, though at the same time filled with awe and fear.

The manuscript further records that Sheikh Adi arrived from a region called Sham'alaya through western direction, between the mountains and Mar Daniel, through the valleys, and from the Daka mountain and Bandawaya. When Sheikh Adi reached the place that would bear his name, he found its head, a man named Mar Yuhanna, who received him and said: "Long ago I heard of you, welcome, O beloved of God. Settle in your place quickly, for the faith was preserved for you." Mar Yuhanna then departed for Jerusalem, where he died.

The Yazidi tradition preserves a detailed account of his journey. On his way he encountered a boatman named Ababakr, who had previously received a vision from Sultan Ezid foretelling that a dervish named Sheikh Adi would come to his boat and must not be refused passage. When the boat filled and no place remained for Sheikh Adi, Ababakr left without him. As the boat departed he recognized him, turned back, and was told: "Do not cry out. I am going to Hakkari, to Lalish. Follow me." In Yazidi sacred hymns, his preaching and journey from the Levant to Lalish is likened in one Qewl to the sound of a bell carried by a falcon in flight: "He came to us like a falcon, ringing a bell in flight, the hearts of men are his domain." In Yazidism, the falcon is a symbol of the keenness of vision (foresight, prophecy) and loyalty to one's Master (God). The bell is a symbol of the Yazidi sermon, through which Sheikh Adi gained followers during his journey from the Levant to Lalish.

Continuing into the mountains, he reached the tribe of Dinan, where a man named Sheikh Hams lived in a cave with his family and flock. Sheikh Hams had received a vision that Ezid would come to him in the form of a dervish, and that the sign would be given when lambs pressed against the sheep during rain and the guest spoke certain words. When this occurred, Sheikh Hams recognized him. The following day, Sheikh Adi reached the tribe of Qaidi, where Saidi Shamsi was herding lambs at a spring. The lambs suddenly turned into rams, the sign Saidi Shamsi had long awaited. He declared: "O Sheikh Adi! So many years I have waited for you and I will follow you!" He planted his staff in the ground, draped his cloak over it so the sheep would remain, and departed with Sheikh Adi.

They came to the village of Baadre at the beginning of the forty-day fast. A man named Ali gave them lodging and instructed his disciples to bring the dervishes one flatbread each evening. Over forty days Sheikh Adi neither ate nor drank, and the untouched flatbreads accumulated. On the last day Ali's servants found all the bread uneaten and reported this to Ali, who understood that one of the dervishes was Sheikh Adi. He found him in the field and said: "O Sheikh Adi! For forty days you were my guest and I did not recognize you." Sheikh Adi replied: "From today I am your sheikh, and you are my haji." From that day the man was known as Haji Ali. Sheikh Adi told him: "I am going to Hakkari and Lalish. Come to me."

He then traveled to the village of Beristak, where at the local cemetery he prayed over a grave. A voice emerged from it: "O Sheikh Adi, you are here?" He answered: "Yes, the time has come. Rest and be at peace." Continuing to the village of Ain Sifni, he stayed with a man named Mand who had long awaited his coming. In the morning Sheikh Adi said three times: "Mando Mali Ava!" ("O Mand! May your house always be in plenty!"), at which Mand recognized him. He then came to two blind men, Usuv Hakkari and Ali Hakkari, who had likewise been awaiting a dervish who would restore their sight. Their children were working in the fields when the grain suddenly bloomed. They saw two dervishes approaching, and Sheikh Adi restored the sight of both men. Ali Hakkari and Usuv Hakkari prostrated themselves before him.

According to Al-Dhahabi, Sheikh Adi spent many years traveling, associating with ascetics and spiritual teachers, and undertaking severe devotional practices before settling in a remote mountain region near Mosul "where there was no human company." Al-Dhahabi states that the area subsequently became inhabited and secure through his presence and blessings, writing that roads previously affected by banditry became safe and that groups among the Kurds abandoned corruption through his influence.

Frank establishes on the basis of preserved writings attributed to Sheikh Adi that he had already settled in the Hakkari mountains before 505 H / 1111 CE, and spent at least two generations there before his passing.

=== Influence and Following ===
After settling in Lalish, people began gathering around him from across the region. His closest disciples included Mahmarashan, Pir Dawud Kharbanda, Amar Qubaysi, Pir Isebiya, and Pir Jarwan, who became his faithful companions and spread his teaching throughout the surrounding region. People came to him from the surroundings of Mosul, the Hakkari mountains, Syria, Iran and other regions and countries, bringing offerings which he distributed to the poor, and his fame spread across the entire East.

The community Sheikh Adi gathered at Lalish was, from its origins, composed of people of different social strata and backgrounds with a shared theological orientation, whose religious worldview and doctrine did not conform to the religion of the majority, and who periodically suffered persecution and violence on this account. The name Dasini appears in historical sources as a designation for the Yazidi religion before Sheikh Adi's arrival. The term persisted as a designation for Yazidis in historical sources well into the nineteenth century and survives to the present day among Syriac and Aramaic speakers as a name for Yazidis. The community Sheikh Adi drew together was an open one, primarily composed of Kurmanji-speaking Kurdish tribal groups from the surrounding mountains, but also receiving people from Persian, Turkish, and Arabic-speaking communities across the wider region.

Yazidi Mishur manuscripts preserving accounts of this period list entire tribes that gathered around him, recording the geographic spread of his following from Basra and Baghdad to Kandahar, and from Armenia to Damascus and Cairo. The Adawi brotherhood, named after Sheikh Adi and used to refer to the Yazidi religion, is attested across the Middle East through the fourteenth and fifteenth centuries, with one branch centered in Cairo under Sheikh Zeyneddin Adani, before gradually dissolving into the surrounding Muslim majority.

According to the Yazidi tradition, the ruler (Mîr) of Harir, Pîr Hesinmeman (Pir Hassan ibn Mam), who was one of the close companions of Sheikh Adi and is considered Pîr of forty Pîrs (Pîrê çil Pîra) and head of the Pîr caste, upon hearing about Sheikh Adi's arrival, initially declared a war on him with his 700 riders and decided to banish him. But when he came to Lalish and saw the dervish dressed in the garment, i.e. Sheikh Adi, he had a vision, after which he left worldly life and became a disciple of Sheikh Adi. The settlement of Salahaddin (Pirmam), is believed to have been the ancestral estate of Pir Hassan ibn Mam.

Ibn al-Athir (1160–1233), writing within living memory of Sheikh Adi's passing, records that he came from Syria, from the region of Baalbek, emigrated to Mosul, and settled in the Hakkari region, a dependency of Mosul, where "people from the cultivated lands and the mountains of those regions attached themselves to him, obeyed him and had a good opinion of him, for he was very famous." Ibn Khallikan (1211–1282) records that after his period of study under a series of prominent sheikhs, he withdrew to the Hakkari mountains, where he built a hermitage (zawiya) and remained, "overwhelmed with visits from devotees," until his death.

Al-Dhahabi describes Sheikh Adi as a widely respected teacher whose reputation spread throughout the region and whose followers benefited from his instruction, piety, and discipline, relating that villages would come out to receive him before hearing him speak, with men and women reportedly repenting upon his arrival. He further states that reports concerning Sheikh Adi's ascetic practices, reputation, miracles, and public benefit became so widespread that "had they occurred in ancient times, they would have become legendary tales."

According to Ibn Khallikan, the people of the region were drawn to him "in a manner which had never been heard of," that his fame spread across far and wide, and that a multitude followed him, their belief in him "exceeding all bounds, until they made him their qibla (direction of prayer) and their treasure for the hereafter".

Al-Maqrizi (d. 1441) similarly records that his tomb became one of the most visited pilgrimage sites in the region, with his followers remaining at his hermitage after his death "following his custom and tradition," while the people around them displayed the same extraordinary veneration and respect they had shown during his lifetime. Jami (died 1492), in his Nafahat al-uns, notes that "his grave in that region is one of the praised pilgrimage sites, at which miraculous graces and manifest signs occur."

=== Reforms and Religious Law ===
Sheikh Adi's arrival in Lalish heralded a new era of considerable change in Yazidi history, as reforms in the system of rule, politics and religion transformed and modernised the Yazidi way of life. Before his arrival the community existed as scattered tribes with a shared theological orientation but no unified form. After coming to Lalish, he united the scattered Yazidi tribes around him and returned to them their ancient temple, which had been occupied by members of other faiths.

The Yazidi religion was revised and reestablished between the 12th and 13th centuries on the basis of Sheikh Adi's teachings, which drew from a mixture of ancient traditions and rites and blended them with the mysticism in which he believed. After its reestablishment during his era, the Yazidi belief system became open to accepting others, allowing them to embrace the religion. The religious reforms of the 12th and 13th centuries were the conglomeration of ancient traditions the Yazidi had been practicing before the coming of Sheikh Adi, along with the reforms that he introduced. The Yazidi religion is understood as rooted in ancient religious rites and traditions still practiced today, such as sanctifying the sun, the ritual of slaughtering bulls at the temple of Lalish, and celebrating feast days related to nature such as Sersal (the Yazidi new year), Bilindah, and the summer and winter festivals.

The era of his activity is described in Yazidi tradition as the "epoch of saints", during which his disciples spread his teaching of the possibility of direct union of the human spirit with God. Originally, the teaching had a supra-religious character, with the knowledge of God as its primary priority. Over time, due to continuous persecution and a hostile environment, the followers of this teaching gradually closed themselves within their community and became an ethno-religious community, one which, today, a person can only be born into. In Yazidi understanding, Sheikh Adi recognized no narrow religious boundaries, engaging equally with Christianity, Islam, and other traditions leading to knowledge of God.

The caste structure that came to define Yazidi social and religious life is conventionally traced to Sheikh Adi's reforms. The three castes consist of Sheikhs (şêx), who fulfill spiritual and administrative functions; Pirs (pîr), who fulfill religious and pastoral functions; and Murids (mirîd), the laypeople and followers. The relationship between the castes is seen as spiritually equivalent to siblinghood and thus, intermarriage between castes is considered sinful and is strictly forbidden. This system is understood as having served a protective function, fostering communal cohesion and continuity in the face of sustained pressure from proselytizing majorities. The long duration of this system, maintained continuously since Sheikh Adi's era, has been cited as a primary factor in the development of a distinct Yazidi ethno-religious identity over subsequent centuries.

The earliest Yazidi written source, the Mišūr of P'īr Sīnī Bahrī (604 AH / 1207–1208 CE), confirms that the caste system was still in formation in the decades immediately following Sheikh Adi's passing, with its final consolidation completed under Sheikh Hasan in the mid-13th century.

Among scholars, Sheikh Adi is also credited with introducing many elements from Sufism to Yazidism, such as the concept of nafs (ego-soul), reverence of some Sufi mystics and saints including Dhu'l Nun al-Misri, Bayazid Bastami and Abdulqadir al-Gilani, as well as metaphysical ideas and ascetic practices found in Sufism.

Sheikh Adi's era is also credited with a flourishing of Yazidi religious literature. Sacred poetry (Qewls, Beyts, Qasida, etc.) were composed, and hagiographies of Yazidi saints compiled. The corpus of Qewls that constitutes the primary source of Yazidi religious knowledge took its foundational form during this period. The Yazidi creed crystallized around his legacy in the formula still recited today: "Miletê Êzdî, Dîn — Şerfedîn" — "We are the Yazidi people, our religion is Sharfadin."

=== Later life and succession ===
In describing the scale of his following, al-Dhahabi recounts the year of his death, when the sultan, governors, sheikhs, and large crowds of common people in Mosul gathered to see him in such high numbers that a screen was erected to prevent people from reaching him and kissing his hand.

Islamic and Western scholarly sources record that Sheikh Adi died in 1162 CE at the age of ninety, and that his remains were interred at Lalish. Ibn Khallikan preserves the eyewitness account of Muzaffar al-Din, lord of Erbil, who recalled seeing Sheikh Adi as a child in Mosul: "He was an old man of medium stature and tanned complexion; many good things were told of him. The Sheikh lived ninety years."

In Yazidism, Sheikh Adi's departure from this world is not seen as an ordinary death but rather as an ascension to his throne in heaven, in accordance with him being an earthly incarnation of God in Yazidi belief.

Following his departure, the leadership of the Yazidi community passed to his nephew Sakhr Abu l-Barakat ibn Sakhr al-Hakkari, whom Sheikh Adi had named as his successor. Under his leadership the community maintained the territorial and spiritual foundations Sheikh Adi had established at Lalish.

The son of Sakhr Abu l-Barakat, Sheikh Adi ibn Abu l-Barakat, grandnephew of the original Sheikh Adi, combined this spiritual inheritance with political authority and expanded the reach of the community, confronting the Mongol forces then pressing into the region and dying at their hands in 619 AH / 1223 CE. In the Yazidi tradition, Sheikh Adi ibn Abu l-Barakat is regarded as the figure who, together with his son Sheikh Hasan, laid the institutional foundation of the Yazidi community as an organized ethno-religious body and established its laws and doctrines.

Sheikh Hasan, son of Sheikh Adi ibn Abu l-Barakat, brought this consolidation to its height during the 1230s and 1240s, presiding over the Sheikhan principality at its greatest territorial and political extent. He is venerated in Yazidism under the title Melek Şêxisin (Angel Shekhsin), understood as the earthly incarnation of one of the seven supreme angels who manifested in human form as a follower and successor of Sheikh Adi. His era saw the creation of a collective council of religious figures ("Council of Holy Men") analogous to a synod, centralization of authority was carried out and the foundational institutions and rules of Yazidi society and religion were established. This period ended with his assassination in 1246 at the hands of Badr al-Din Lu'lu, ruler of Mosul.

In 1254 CE, Lu'lu launched a full military campaign against the Yazidi community. His forces entered the temple at Lalish, exhumed the bones of Sheikh Adi and burned them before the captive Yazidis present, crucifying and killing those taken at the sanctuary. The Yazidis regained control of Hakkari, Bahdinan and the Dasin region under the reign of Şerfedîn, however this was a short-lived triumph as he was killed by Mongol forces in 1257 CE.

The political unit that consolidated around Lalish through this period, the principality of Sheikhan, took its name from Sheikh Adi himself. Centered on Duhok, with the mountain overlooking the city known as Mount Dasin, it was administered by rulers who continued to carry the Dasinî epithet well into the nineteenth century. From the thirteenth century onward it becomes increasingly identifiable in historical sources.

== Role in Yazidism ==
Sheikh Adi occupies the central position in Yazidi religion as the earthly incarnation of God, a manifestation of God who descended into human form. This belief is grounded in the doctrine of hulul, the manifestation of God and the Angels in the form of holy persons. In Yazidi theology this is held as a literal claim rather than a metaphorical or honorific designation: God is understood to have revealed Himself in the person of Sheikh Adi in order to give humanity an example of love and faith. He is described as "the cornerstone and crown" of the Yazidi faith, and identified as the founder of the form of Yazidism that has survived from the twelfth century to the present day. He is considered the great reformer of the Yazidi religion, one who "preached a possibility of direct fusion with God," and around whose person, name and worldview the Yazidi people as an ethno-religious community became unified.

Yazidi theology holds that the eternal God (Xudê) manifests in three primary hypostases: Siltan Êzîd, the supreme divine aspect; Tawûsî Melek, the Peacock Angel who presides over the other angels; and Sheikh Adi, the divine person who became incarnate in human history. The three are understood as inseparable, as articulated in the Qewlê Keniya Mara (Hymn of the Laughter of Snakes):

"Şîxadî û Tawûsî Melek û Siltan Êzî êkin,

Hûn me'niya jêk nekin"

"Sheikh Adi, Tawûsî Melek, Sultan Êzî are one; do not regard them as separate."

The same hymn declares further:

"Navê Şîxadî yê şîrîn, yê şirîf bi xo Xudêye" "The name of Sheikh Adi, the sweet, the noble, is verily God."

The theological mechanism through which they are one is expressed in the Yazidi concept of sur (divine mystery, essence, or innermost light), transmitted through a chain of divine manifestation: "Sheikh Adi is a sur, he is light [nûr] from light. Sheikh Adi is from the light of Êzi. Êzi is from the light of Tawûsî Melek. Tawûsî Melek is from the light of God."

=== Yazidi concept of incarnation and the Qewls ===
This threefold manifestation is further elaborated through the Yazidi concept of dahir and batin, the manifest and the hidden. The hidden heavenly council (Dîwana Batinî) of the seven great angels is understood to be manifested on earth as the visible council (Dîwana Dahirî) of seven saints, each of whom is the earthly counterpart of one of the seven angels. Sheikh Adi stands at the head of this council, whose other members are Şêxisin, Şêxûbekir, Fexredîn, Şêşims, Sicadîn, and Nasirdîn. God himself is understood to speak in the Qewls under the names of each of these saints in turn. The saints of the Council of the Manifest appear as the protagonists of individual Qewls, through whom questions about creation and the ordering of the world are addressed to God. The seven saints are simultaneously understood as real historical figures and as earthly expressions of the divine. According to Yazidi teaching, Sheikh Adi once declared: "I am a sheikh, I am a pir, I am a murid!", a formulation understood to express the unity of the divine, the priestly, and the devotional in his person.

Through hulul, these persons perform miracles (karamat), strengthen faith, heal illness, and show the path to the knowledge of God. Yazidism holds that every religion contains a portion of truth, and that saints of any faith can perform miracles by God's will; but Sheikh Adi alone is understood as the full earthly manifestation of the divine essence itself.

In Yazidism, a clear distinction is drawn between this concept of sainthood and the category of prophethood. While prophets of other religions are treated with respect and mentioned in the Qewls and other sacred texts due to their role as teachers of humanity, Yazidism has no prophet and these prophets hold no prophetic authority within the religion. The sole authoritative sources of Yazidi religious doctrine are the Qewls and Beyts, which contain the foundations of the "teaching (science) of Sheikh Adi" (Ilmê Şîxadî), transmitted to the Yazidi saints through Fexredin.

The distinction between Yazidism and the Abrahamic traditions with respect to scripture is addressed directly in the Qewlê Sibeyek ji yêt Edewiya ("The Morning of the Adawis"), in which the angel Melek Fexredin asks God:

"You have inscribed four Sacred Books and revealed them to the peoples: why then have You not bestowed upon us, the Yazidis, a Scripture?"

God reminds Fexredin that he has already encountered the truth and known it beyond the written scripture by responding:

"And where did you yourself encounter that Truth which descends from the Heights?"

Fexredin's own answer to the question is:

"The Truth lives in the sacred Qewls at the assembly of the Feqirs... This eternal Truth has dwelt in our Qewls, in the community of Feqirs, since time immemorial."

Thus, the Qewl collection is a treasury of truth that replaces scripture for the Yazidis. The Yazidi faith is based on the Qewls and on the Xerqe, a cloak symbolising humility and modesty as well as the priestly class of Feqirs, who are clothed in the Xerqe and have the responsibility to lead their community towards the path of salvation.

The same Qewl opens with the words: "What a clear morning! The Adawis sing the song of Sheikh Adi" and describes the pilgrimage to Lalish as "our primordial hajj, our qibla — now as before," with Sheikh Adi declared "our Ruler, our King."

=== Pre-existence and cosmic role ===
In Yazidi doctrine, Sheikh Adi is described as a hypostasis of God: he is held to have existed "in the antechamber of creation," prior to the material world, being called into being by God while still nonetheless bearing God's own Name and fully possessing properties of God:

"God created the holy Sheikh and named him with His own Name, and everything, from tree to stone, prostrated at the royal feet."

The Qewls state that the universe itself was created for Sheikh Adi's sake, just as it was created for the sake of the pre-existent souls of the Yezidi community:

"He raised the Sheikh — the Padishah, he created the heights of heaven and earthly dust for his sake."

The Qewls assert that the souls of the Yazidis existed before the creation of the world, already living in love and conversing with God. The creation of the world itself is believed to have followed from the prayer of this pre-eternal community: "And the Yazidis prayed to God: 'O King, show mercy!' They raised their prayer: 'Creator, we desire love!'", and it was after this prayer that the first acts of creation proceeded. God is recorded in the Qewl as having created a covenant and law for the Yazidis out of Light: "My King created out of Light the covenant and law for the Yazidis."

In the Qewls Sheikh Adi is frequently called the "Friend" of the Yazidis, because by taking on human form he became a participant in the same nature as his followers, while not losing his divine nature.

Despite possessing the Name and attributes of God, Sheikh Adi is described as having studied with God from the beginning of time: "My Friend with Him learned all secrets from the beginning of time." Through this primordial learning he became omniscient, "He contained all wisdom within himself", and omnipotent, having co-created the universe with the Padishah (God): "He is the treasury of unprecedented power, the source of endless forces." The Qewls present him as the direct ruler of all countries and peoples: "Sheikh Adi — Sheikh of lands and countries, Sultan of both land and sea."

The Qasida of Sheikh Adi, attributed to him directly and preserved in the Yazidi liturgical canon, elaborates his divine attributes and power in the first person. He declares his omnipresence and sovereignty over the laws of nature: "I am wider than the heights of heaven, higher than the vault of heaven"; "I gave the space of the universe an unshakeable law"; "I contain the whole world within myself." His authority is described as received directly from Sultan Ezid, of whom he is inseparable: "Thus God the Most High said to me: 'You are the ruler of the expanses.'" The Qasida further presents him as the teacher of Adam himself: "It was I who taught Adam, I who set him on the path."

The Qasida of Sheikh Adi, the oldest authenticated writing attributed to Sheikh Adi, preserved in Yazidi manuscripts from the 13th century and discussed as central to Yazidi religious understanding in the living tradition of the Qewals, articulates his divine self-identification as God in the first person.

Sheikh Adi also acknowledges his earthly biography in the Qasida as a man with parents and a homeland, "I am Adi, son of Musafir, from the eastern land — Sham", but still possessing divine properties and attributes.

Additional works attributed to Sheikh Adi, preserved in Beled Sinjar, elaborate the same themes: "I am my essence; out of my essence existence came with its marvel"; "I am the First before whom there was no one in the beginning nor in the end"; "I am the ʿAdī of yesterday, of the day before yesterday, of today, of the past, and of what is to come"; "I am, all in all; you are in my mind and in my sight"; "I am the light of lights, he knows me by my light"; "I am the soul of souls, he who knows knows me"; "I existed before both heavens and earth, before Adam; all of these are my creations."

The Qewls assert his existence before Islam: "He was before Islam arose." His unity with God is proclaimed directly in the Qasida: "I am one with the One God, with Him I am forever united." His divine hiddenness as a manifestation of God is also expressed in Qewlê Şîxadî Şêxê Şara (Sheikh Adi the Sheikh of Lands and Countries):

"My Sheikh is hidden in the cave,

He appeared before the letters,

The radiance of Sheikh Adi has embraced the entire world from four sides."

The cave symbolizes the hiddenness of the divine principle inaccessible to human perception. He also predates the "letters", the primordial spiritual elements from which the first "words and speeches" of existence were formed.

=== Tomb at Lalish ===
Sheikh Adi's departure from this world is understood in Yazidism not as an ordinary death but as a divine ascension. The Qewl "Sheikh Adi the Sheikh of Lands and Countries" (Qewlê Şîxadî Şêxê Şara) summarizes his entire earthly mission: "Sheikh Adi, descending from the heights, bestowed gifts upon all, and then rose again to the heavens." The Qewl "Sheikh Adi and Holy Men" (Qewlê Şîxadî û Mêra) states: "Sheikh Adi ascended to heaven on his throne."

The term used within the community for his place of interment at Lalish is not "grave" or "tomb" but sindruk, from the Arabic sundūq, meaning box or chest, understood as the resting place of a saint's relics, reflecting the Yazidi belief that saints depart this world in a manner that transcends ordinary death. The annual Cemaya Şîxadî feast at Lalish commemorates his departure ("Qedemguhastin") through a specific ritual: the Berê Şibakê, a stretcher historically used to carry his relics, is reassembled each year and cleansed in the waters of the Kanîya Spî spring while priests sing the Qewlê Texta ("Hymn of the Throne"), which describes the creation of the world and the divine throne.

His tomb at Lalish, marked by conical white spires, is the holiest site in Yazidism. The Qewl "I Sing" (Qewlê Distrêm) contains a metaphorical description of the Lalish sanctuary. It describes Lalish as Sheikh Adi's own dwelling place and as the spiritual center of Yazidi life, directing the faithful:

"If you fall ill, hasten to Lalish — Sheikh Adi himself will free you from all suffering. If you are saddened, if your soul is heavy, hasten to Lalish."

Believers are obligated to maintain an inner connection with Lalish, wherever they may be, as the "Divine Presence" is believed to be omnipresent:

"Everything is in the palm of Sheikh Adi's hand, and everything is in the power of the royal hands!"

In Yazidi belief, after parting with the body, souls of deceased Yazidis pass through Lalish, where paradise opens in due time and the purified souls dwell eternally with their Creator:

"Holy Lalish,

Where there is no longer death, nor sorrow, nor troubles,

There is the abode of Sheikh Adi.

There is Paradise, and the Light shines forever."

— Qewlê Şîxadî Şêxê Şara

=== Soteriological role ===
The Qewlê Hevsari ("The Qewl of the Bridle") uses the metaphor of a horse's bridle to describe the controlling of human desires and nafs. Just as a horse is controlled with a bridle, human desires (nafs) are restrained through the guidance of Yazidi doctrine and Sheikh Adi's teachings. Yazidi clergy are thus held as powerful riders who have bridled their "horse" (nafs) and help people by guiding them toward faith and righteousness. The Qewl opens with the declaration:

"Listen, O Yazidi brothers, let every brother know:

The teachings of Sheikh Adi contain great blessings!

The writings of Sultan Ezid, his precious barat — are gold!

Let our murids preserve all of this in their hearts."

According to the Qewl, one of the chief signs of faith is "agitation of the mind and restlessness of the heart," that is, the constant search for truth that is inherent in a believer, even if they are "a hundred years old, or more." Faith is united with spiritual knowledge (ilm): only those who have attained it on Earth will be worthy of conversing with the saints in the next life. Saved souls join with the Angels and become "cupbearers in paradise," who share the "wine of love" and knowledge with other souls. In the 56th stanza of Qewlê Seremergê ("The Qewl of the Death Bed"), which describes the soul's journey through death, the post-mortem interrogation, and the crossing of the Sarat bridge, Sheikh Adi along with Melik Şêxisin is invoked as the judgement of the soul draws near:

"The time is approaching,

And the judgement is near,

Prayers will save my soul!

So let the holy names of Şîxadî and Melik Şêxisin be pronounced over me."

== Miraculous accounts ==
Eyewitness accounts of miracles performed by Sheikh Adi are preserved in sacred Yazidi texts as well as both Islamic and Christian sources.

According to the words of Mahmarashan, one of Sheikh Adi's closest disciples, recorded in Arabic Islamic sources: "Once I saw Sheikh Adi walking barefoot along a rocky path, and my heart trembled. I thought he might injure his feet. Then I looked more carefully and saw that beneath his feet, at the distance of a handspan, there were two glowing circles of light."

Sheikh Abdullah al-Bataikhi reported: "I spent fifty years in the company of Adi and not once did I see him eat or drink." Sheikh Abu Muhammad Yusuf recorded that during a long period of companionship with Sheikh Adi, he once dreamed he was very hungry, and Sheikh Adi handed him a plate of grapes. Upon waking, he felt the taste of grapes in his mouth. Sheikh Dawud ibn al-Muhbar stated: "Forty years I spent in his company and not once did I see him break his fast or sleep at night."

=== Resurrection of the dead ===
Amar Qubaysi recounted that while he was with Sheikh Adi at Lalish, representatives of the Bozi tribe came and helped build an enclosure for a garden. A large stone fell on one of them, crushed his bones, and he died. His companion Khatib Hassan ran to Sheikh Adi and told him what had happened. Sheikh Adi went to the man and prayed over him. The dead man rose and moved freely as before.

=== Walking on water ===
Sheikh Aqil reported that he and Sheikh Adi needed to cross a river. Sheikh Adi spread his cloak on the surface of the water and crossed upon it. Sheikh Aqil did the same. Sheikh Aqil's cloak became wet; Sheikh Adi's did not.

=== Power over nature ===
The Arab chronicler Ibn Ibad al-Hanbali recorded: "If we pronounced the name of the Sheikh in front of the lions, they froze; above the waves, they would calm down; during a hurricane, it would subside."

According to Qala'id al-Jawahir, Abu Isra'il Yaqub ibn Abd al-Muqtadir, a wandering ascetic who had spent three years in mountain isolation, reported that Sheikh Adi appeared at his side when he called upon God for a saintly protector. The Sheikh struck a boulder with his foot, producing a spring, and caused a pomegranate tree to grow from another stone. He instructed the tree: "I am Adi, so grow — one day sweet, and one day sour." He left Abu Isra'il there with instructions that invoking his name would provide protection. Abu Isra'il later testified that whenever he encountered lions or wild beasts on his travels, naming Sheikh Adi caused them to depart, and that once, when a fierce storm on the Sea of Basra threatened to sink his vessel, invoking Sheikh Adi's name caused the wind to abate and the waters to calm instantly.

=== Account of forty sheikhs from Baghdad ===
When a group of sheikhs arrived riding lions and using serpents as whips to test his power, Sheikh Adi disposed of both: cows he sent devoured the lions, and chickens he sent pecked the serpents to death. When the same sheikhs in a cave demanded water for ritual washing, Sheikh Adi struck the cave wall with his staff and called out "Come, Zamzam!", after which the waters of the Zamzam well near the Kaaba in Mecca poured into the cave, carrying with them even the prayer beads and staff that one of the sheikhs, a man named Ahmad, had forgotten at the Kaaba during his pilgrimage.

A parallel account is recorded in Yazidi texts. Forty Baghdadi Sufi sheikhs headed by Ahmad ar-Rifai and Abu al-Wafa Hulwani came to Lalish to challenge and witness Sheikh Adi's divine essence and miracles. The cave of the Zamzam spring was very small and narrow. The sheikhs complained to Sheikh Adi and he told them to lean their backs against the wall of the cave and say "By the power of God and Sheikh Adi," and the space would become spacious. Then, when the time for their prayer came and they demanded water to perform ritual ablutions, Sheikh Adi struck a rock with his staff and called for water, after which water poured into the cave. According to Yazidi religious scholars, the source of this water comes from the Zamzam well at the Kaaba, which Sheikh Adi brought forth for the sheikhs. The spring is still present at Lalish today and known as Kaniya Zimzim. After the Baghdad sheikhs were convinced of Sheikh Adi's holiness, they left him.

=== Poison transformed ===
The Qewlê Pîr Dawid (Hymn of Pir Dawud) records that Imad al-Din Zangi (1084–1146), ruler and founder of the Zangid dynasty, grew alarmed by the expanding influence of Sheikh Adi and marched against him. He dispatched one of his subjects, a man named Dawud, as an envoy to Lalish, loading him with a cargo that included poison. Sheikh Adi questioned Dawud directly: "Tell me the truth: what gift has Sultan Zangi sent me?", and Dawud confessed: "There is nothing unknown before you. The gift the sultan sent, on one side is vinegar, on the other is poison." Sheikh Adi then told him to set down his load, declaring that what he carried was in fact oil and honey. The poison was transformed into oil and honey before Dawud. Witnessing this, Dawud acknowledged Sheikh Adi's divine power and pledged himself as his follower.

=== The restored tongue ===
Returning to Zangi, Dawud was asked to truthfully report the power and miracle-working of the sheikh. He replied: "O lord, turn back, set foot on the righteous path — the power of Sheikh Adi is, without doubt, the power of God." Zangi, whom the Qewl describes as overcome by the pride of his nafs, seized Dawud and had his tongue cut out at the root. For three days and three nights Dawud wandered voiceless through Zangi's encampment, unable to speak and communicating only by hand gestures. He then returned to Sheikh Adi, who blew upon his lips, and Dawud's tongue moved seven times better than before.

=== Dod and the consuming sea ===
The Qewl of Pir Dawud records that after restoring Dawud's tongue, Sheikh Adi summoned another disciple, Dod, and attached the mystical Sea of Nazoki beneath his arm. He seated Dod on a "gluttonous horse", understood in Yazidi interpretation as a metaphor for the nafs, the animal instinct of insatiable appetite, which Sheikh Adi had awakened within him — and dispatched him into the encampment of Sultan Zangi. Sheikh Adi instructed Dod: "Each morning invoke the hearth of Sheikh Adi as your support, and go — shatter the army of Sultan Zangi for our sake." Dod proceeded to consume all the food and fruit stores of the sultan's army. Zangi turned to his steward and asked: "Tell me the truth — what is this stomach of Dod?" The steward replied: "O lord, the stomach of Dod is a sea; the whole world cannot contend with it, save the Mighty King." He then advised Zangi to lift Dod's tongue, under which lay a blue sea that the entire world could not overcome save the "Axis of the Ages", an epithet applied in Yazidi sacred hymns primarily to Sheikh Adi himself.

Scholars have noted that the motif of Sheikh Adi placing the sea within his disciple's body, such that the entire world cannot overcome what is concealed within him, carries echoes of the Sumero-Akkadian myth of primordial chaos as preserved in the Babylonian creation epic Enuma Elish ("When on high..."). In that tradition, the two primordial beings Tiamat and Apsu are anthropomorphic or zoomorphic figures within whose bodies the boundless sea is enclosed.

=== Healing ===
His reputation as a healer spread widely. People came from cities and settlements across the East having heard that Sheikh Adi healed all illnesses.

=== Omniscience ===
According to a story in Yazidi tradition, a man named Pir Khoshaba, who lived in great poverty and could barely earn enough for bread, heard that Lord Sheikh Adi had appeared in the Hakkari Mountains and was healing people of all illnesses. News of him spread throughout the East, and people from many towns and villages came to visit him. They brought gifts to Sheikh Adi: some offered a chicken, others a bull or a lamb. Pir Khoshaba returned home and said to his wife: "O Handmaiden of God, people are going to our Lord Sheikh Adi with gifts, yet we have not gone to him." "We have nothing except barley flour," his wife replied.

She baked a barley flatbread and gave it to her husband, who immediately set out to see Sheikh Adi. When he arrived, he saw an enormous crowd, and everyone had brought valuable gifts. Pir Khoshaba became ashamed, hid the flatbread beneath his cloak, and stood behind a tree, waiting for the others to leave. But nothing could be hidden from Sheikh Adi. He immediately called for the crowd to make way and allow Pir Khoshaba to approach. The people stepped aside and let the poor pir pass. Sheikh Adi then addressed him: "O Pir Khoshaba, I accept the flatbread you hide beneath your cloak. It is equal in worth to a bull."

According to Qala'id al-Jawahir, Shaikh Ismail al-Tunisi recounted that together with a party of fellow Tunisians, he set out to visit Sheikh Adi. Once they reached their destination and saluted the sheikh, they sat down to discuss the miracles of the saints. Sheikh Adi told the gathering that any true sheikh is aware of every single movement his disciple makes, regardless of distance. Upon returning home to Tunisia, Ismail avoided his wife for a month out of a sense of being watched. Sheikh Adi, aware of this from afar, sent a message through a traveling group of disciples summoning Ismail back. When he arrived, Sheikh Adi rebuked him: "Which is dearer to the Shaikh — to see his pupil engaged in something lawful, or in something unlawful? You must not behave like that again."

According to Manaqib al-Sheikh Adi ibn Musafir, Hasan al-Husuri related that while setting out from the village of Bartella to make a pilgrimage to "his lord" Sheikh Adi, he met a dervish stranger who offered to trade him a completed barefoot pilgrimage to Mecca for Hasan's intended pilgrimage to the sheikh, then successively raised the offer to two, three, four, and finally eight Mecca pilgrimages in exchange. Hasan refused each offer, declaring he would prefer nothing to his pilgrimage to the sheikh, and the stranger departed. On arriving, Sheikh Adi greeted him by name before he could explain himself, welcoming "the one who refused to sell his pilgrimage for eight pilgrimages," and remarking that had he sold it, he would truly have suffered a loss.

=== Moving mountains ===
According to Qala'id al-Jawahir, Shaikh Umar recorded a further account in which a visiting group of Sufis arrived skeptical of Sheikh Adi's standing and determined to test him. When one of them attempted to challenge him through conversation, Sheikh Adi, aware of their intention, said that God had empowered certain of His servants such that if one of them commanded two mountains to join together, they would do so. The assembled visitors looked toward the mountains and saw them join into one; they fell at his feet. The Sheikh then pointed his hand toward the mountains and they returned to their former condition. The Sufis repented and enrolled among his students.

=== Deliverance of prisoners from captivity ===
The Manaqib of Sheikh Adi preserves a first-person account attributed to a Kurdish disciple, Sheikh Ishaq of Sardawil, who recounts being taken captive with thirty-nine companions, drawn from his own district as well as the regions of Erbil and Mosul, during a campaign against Crusader forces near Tripoli, and held in a cistern thirty cubits deep under armed guard. After ten nights of invoking Sheikh Adi's name as he had been taught, Ishaq relates that the sheikh appeared to him in a vision, drew all but one skeptical captive out of the cistern in a single motion, broke their fetters, and led them on a night journey that included raiding a mill for food and crossing the Euphrates in a single stride, delivering them to Nisibin by morning. The account closes with the freed captives making a pilgrimage to Sheikh Adi's hermitage, where they wept and kissed his feet in thanks for their deliverance.

=== Power over soldiers and converts ===
A disciple named Lahiq recounted that when three soldiers rode toward Sheikh Adi's hermitage, their horses halted at his glance and could not be driven forward by whip or spur until he gestured them nearer. The sheikh then challenged them on whether their emirs, for all their bows and swords, could make water flow uphill, which they denied. By performing this miracle, he instilled humility in them before spiritual power.

=== The barren field ===
A farmer complained to Sheikh Adi of his field's infertility. The sheikh went to the field and spoke over it; after it was watered, the crop sprouted, and within six days a harvest was reaped equal in yield to three years' produce. When the farmer asked what words he had spoken over the field, the sheikh told him only to go his way, for the field would never again be barren.

== Muslim perspective ==
=== Medieval Islamic sources ===
Rudolf Frank, surveying the full body of Islamic literary notices, concludes that the picture they present of Sheikh Adi, "in noteworthy unanimity" is of "a thoroughly Sunni-grounded Sufi, who was well aware of the authority he enjoyed in wide circles."

The Islamic geographer Yaqut al-Hamawi (d. 1229) calls Sheikh Adi "the sheikh and imam of the Kurds," a Shafi'i. The Islamic historian Ibn al-Athir (d. 1233) describes him as "the zahid", one who made the strictest observance of religious prescriptions his life's purpose.

The central problem that Islamic scholarship has historically confronted and, in Frank's assessment, failed to resolve is how a Sufi praised for his Sunni orthodoxy became the chief saint of what Islamic authorities regarded as a heretical community. Frank concludes his survey with the observation that "the Islamic literature cannot explain why a Sufi praised for his orthodoxy became the chief saint of a heretical sect; plausible explanations for this strange fact are nowhere to be found in the relevant Islamic literature."

Two influential medieval Muslim theologians, Ibn Taymiyya (died 1328), author of Risalat al-Adawiyya, and his contemporary Abu'l-Firas Ubaisallah, articulated a recurring Islamic scholarly position that Sheikh Adi himself had been a pious Sufi, and that it was his successor Sheikh Hasan who had corrupted the original teaching by introducing the deification of Sheikh Adi and the veneration of Yazid ibn Muawiya into what had previously been an orthodox Sufi brotherhood.

Al-Maqrizi (d. 1441) provides the most detailed Islamic account of the community's subsequent history. By his account, the followers had developed practices Islamic authorities regarded as scandalous: they claimed Sheikh Adi "sat with God the Exalted and ate bread and onions with him"; they neglected obligatory prayers on the grounds that "Sheikh Adi prays on our behalf"; they made the tomb at Lalish their Qibla. Al-Maqrizi also records accusations of sexual licentiousness. Rudolf Frank, on the basis of these characterizations, notes that the claims of moral misconduct directed at the Yazidi community belong to "the category of malicious accusations repeatedly raised against this sect by Muslims and also by Christians, and, as unbiased Western observers of the Yazidis confirm, without any basis."

The same source records that in 817 AH (1415 CE), the Islamic religious authorities organized a military expedition against the Yazidi community in the Hakkari mountains, collecting a large army with the support of several Kurdish and Arab emirs. The expedition killed large numbers of Sheikh Adi's followers, known at the time among the Kurds as Sohbetiye, took others captive, destroyed the dome over Sheikh Adi's tomb, dug up his grave, and burned his exhumed remains in the presence of the captives, telling them: "See how we burn the one of whom you claim all that you claim, yet who is unable to prevent us from doing so." The community rebuilt the shrine and subsequently "became enemies of anyone who bore the title of faqih (Islamic theologian) and killed them wherever they could."

=== Kitab Manaqib al-Sheikh Adi ibn Musafir ===
The Kitab Manaqib al-Sheikh Adi ibn Musafir, a hagiographic work in the Islamic tradition dated to 1509 CE and preserved in the Berlin manuscript, records testimonies and accounts of Sheikh Adi's miraculous feats and asceticism from his disciples, among which that "he recited the entire Quran twice every night" and spent long periods in caves, mountains and deserts in ascetic withdrawal. The same source records that Sheikh Adi used to travel preaching through the villages in the cultivated land south of the Hakkari mountains, "always surrounded by crowds of his actual disciples, the Adawis, and other followers or curious onlookers," and that "where it was necessary, he spoke Kurdish."

=== Fatwa of Mala Salih al-Kurdi al-Hakkari ===
A 16th-century fatwa (al-Radd ʿala al-Yazidiyya) issued by Mala Salih al-Kurdi al-Hakkari, mufti of Kurdistan and dated to 1572 (980 AH), focuses on a rejection of the Yazidi faith and provides a brief exposition of its doctrines, tenets and lore as known to the author, and enumerates a series of charges against the Yazidis: that the community denies the Quran and Religious Law, calling them lies; that they express violent enmity toward Islamic scholars; that they consider Sheikh Adi superior to the Prophet "by many degrees, there is no comparison between them"; that they "tell stories about God, His Prophet, and Sheikh Adi including objects which place God and His Prophet lower than Sheikh Adi"; that they hold there is no profit in prayer; that they believe Lalish superior to the Kaaba and that pilgrimage to Lalish replaces the obligation of hajj; and that they believe on Resurrection Day Sheikh Adi will carry his community on a tray on his head to paradise "irrespective of the wish of God and His angels."

The fatwa documents three distinct positions regarding Sheikh Adi's nature: first, the Ghulat (Extremists), who hold that "Adi b. Musafir is God"; second, those who hold that "the heavens are in the hands of God and the earth is in the hands of Sheikh Adi"; third, those who hold that he is "the great minister of God and no affair whatever comes from God without his approval and counsel."

On Sheikh Adi, charge 8 of the fatwa states that Sheikh Adi himself declares his displeasure against God and the prophet Muhammed coming near himself, and that he declares his freedom from the need to befriend them.

On the legal status of the community, the fatwa reaches comprehensive conclusions: they are "pure unbelievers"; their repentance obtained by coercion is not accepted since "they will not abandon their beliefs in 'Adi', 'Yazid', 'Lalish', and other sheikhs"; marriage with them and consumption of their slaughtered animals are prohibited; "killing them, fighting against them where they have obtained power, and shedding their blood" are prescribed; and their property "is presumably suspended until they return to orthodoxy or are killed for heresy."

=== Modern period ===
An 18th-century Mosul historian, Mohammed Emin al-Omari (d. 1789), characterizes the Yazidi community as apostates (murtaddin) who "worship the sun and love Satan," and writes that "God afflicted him (Sheikh Adi) with a people of apostates, called Yazidis. They say: 'When the Day of Resurrection comes, Sheikh Adi will come and carry us on a tray on his head and bring us thus into paradise and he will do this even against the will of God.'" His younger brother Yasin al-Omari writes: "God visited him with a misfortune, in that he let the Yazidis appear, who claim that Sheikh Adi is God, and who have made his grave the destination of their pilgrimages. They go there annually under drumbeats, to devote themselves to games and indulgence."

== Christian perspective ==
=== Manuscript on How Sheikh Adi Came ===
A Chaldean manuscript preserved in the library of the Chaldean Dominican Monastery, catalogued by Father Jacques Ishaq and Father Boutros Haddad, titled "Manuscript on How Sheikh Adi Came," records an account of Sheikh Adi's arrival in the Dasin region from a Christian source. The manuscript relates that a blind man in the land known as Lower Dasin would repeat daily that a great sheikh was approaching and that when he arrived, peace and security would fill the land and no person would be able to harm another. Asked by the local people for a sign of his coming, the blind man declared that the sun would change color — to green, saffron, yellow and red, accompanied by movements and portents. When the signs appeared, the people gathered around the blind man and rejoiced, though they were also afraid.

Sheikh Adi arrived from the west, between Jabal and Mar Daniel, through the valleys of a place called Shamlaya from Daka mountain and Bandawaya. A shepherd boy who saw him abandoned his flock to follow him. Sheikh Adi gently turned him back, saying: "Why did you leave your sheep and your village? Return, boy." The boy answered that he wished to accompany him regardless, but the Sheikh left him behind. Upon arriving at the valley that would come to bear his name, the head of the monastery there, known as Mar Yuhanna, greeted him: "Long ago I heard of you, welcome, beloved of God. Settle quickly in your place, for the faith has been kept for you." Mar Yuhanna then departed for Jerusalem, where he died.

The boy who had followed Sheikh Adi came with his mother, whom Sheikh Adi had summoned through one of his followers after finding the child weeping bitterly for her. His follower found the mother sitting and weeping for her son, told her he was safe, and she rose immediately and followed. When she arrived, Sheikh Adi said to his follower: "You have done a good deed. You will labor with your bodies and possess your souls." The boy lived with his mother, and from him descended a community known as the Qirnayi.

The manuscript further records that when Sheikh Abd al-Qadir in Baghdad heard of Sheikh Adi, he set out in anger toward the Yazidi lands. Upon reaching a place called Jabal Maqlub, he saw in a dream a blazing light and brilliant radiance and was greatly afraid. A voice came from heaven saying: "Return, beloved, for you will harm yourself to no avail." He returned in secret. Those accompanying him asked why they were turning back so quietly, but received no answer.

=== Chronicon Syriacum by Bar Hebraeus ===
The Syriac historian and Jacobite Christian chronicler Bar Hebraeus (d. 1286) mentions "Sheikh Adi, whom the Kurds of the country of Mawsil hold to be a prophet" in his Chronicon Syriacum. He records further that in 1205, a group of Kurds "who had not entered the Faith of the Muslims" descended from the mountains, describing their beliefs as "primitive paganism and Magianism", a characterization Rodziewicz notes does not identify them as Zoroastrians but attributes to them "non-Muslim and non-Christian beliefs." Bar Hebraeus also records at three points in his chronicle the activities of later "sons of Sheikh Adi" caught up in the Mongol invasions of 1275–1276, noting that "the Kurds of the region of Mosul received them as prophets."

=== Reception by monks at a monastery ===
Al-Dhahabi also records an episode of Sheikh Adi passing by a monastery, where Christian monks greeted him by uncovering their heads, kissing his feet and saying "pray for us, for we are only in your blessings." They then brought out a plate of bread and honey, which the group ate together.

=== Identification with Mar Addai ===
A tradition maintained among the Nestorian Christian communities living among the Yazidis identified Sheikh Adi with the Apostle Addai, the legendary first-century missionary credited in East Syriac Christianity with evangelizing Edessa at the invitation of King Abgar and founding what became the Church of the East. Frank, writing in 1911, notes that the hypothesis "has repeatedly been expressed" and that the Nestorian Christians living among the Yazidis "hold" to it as a living tradition at the time of writing.

The Apostle Addai occupies a foundational position in the Syriac Christian tradition of northern Mesopotamia. He is the subject of the Doctrine of Addai, a Syriac document recording his mission to Edessa, and his name is borne by the Anaphora of Addai and Mari, the ancient eucharistic prayer still used in the liturgy of the Assyrian Church of the East and the Chaldean Catholic Church. His name in Syriac, ܐܕܝ (Addai), stands in close phonetic proximity to the Arabic ʿAdī, differing only in the emphatic quality of the final consonant, a similarity Frank identifies as the main basis for the identification: the hypothesis was "mainly suggested by the similarity of the two names."

In a travel account titled "From Ararat to Tigris" signed "Yu.", published in the Tiflis newspaper Kavkaz (No. 163, 22 June 1882), describing the Yazidi community of Sheikhan, the author notes that near Ba'adre there exists a Yazidi sanctuary housing the tomb of "Sheikh Addé, a saint held by them in great reverence," who in Yazidi belief "is to return to earth and make them all happy." The author then proposes the identification: "The name Addé is reminiscent of Addai or Thaddaeus; St. Jerome, speaking of this apostle, calls him Sanctus Addaeus seu Thaddaeus. It is possible to suppose that he was among this people and that his preaching of Christ became merged in their traditions with the concept of himself." The author further notes what he interprets as Christian traces in Yazidi practice: monastic organization, fasting, a baptism-like rite, a church hierarchy, and family names carrying Aramaic resonance, among them bet Muttran (house of the metropolitan), bet Efiskof (house of the bishop), and the village name Baadre, which he proposes as a contraction of Bet Adra, "house of the Virgin Mother."

=== Armenian Christian tradition ===
A 19th-century Russian imperial administrative report on the Yazidis of the Caucasus, compiled by C. A. Egiazarov and published in Tiflis in 1884, preserves an extract from the report of the district chief of Alexandropol describing Yazidi religious practice among the community then settled in the region following their migration from the Ottoman Empire. The report notes that the Yazidi religious center lies in Sheikhan, in Mesopotamia, at the village of Ba'adre, "where there is an ancient Yazidi monastery [Temple of Lalish] built in the name of Sheikh Adi." It then records a tradition circulating among the Armenian Christian population of the region: "According to the legend of the Armenian chroniclers, this Adi had first been the high priest of the Armenian king Avgar, who adopted Christianity, and then became a bishop. He lived in the monastery [Temple of Lalish] of Ba'adre."

=== Manuscript of Monk Ramisho ===
A Nestorian manuscript purportedly written in 1452 by a monk named Ramisho from the monastery of Beith-Abe, addressed to a certain Rabban Joseph of the monastery of Mar-Michael of Tarrel, purports to record the history of the seizure of the Nestorian monastery of Mar-Yuhanna and Isho Sabran. The manuscript was recopied in 1588 by the deacon Aushana and again in 1880, and was first published in the West in 1915–17 by Abbé F. Nau, with a French translation and annotations by the Chaldean priest Joseph Tfinkdji.

The text opens with a formal statement of purpose: Ramisho undertakes to describe how "Adi, son of Musafir, son of Ahmed, of the dynasty of the Umayyads and of the family of Yazid son of Muawiya, took and seized" the monastery of Mar Yuhanna and Isho Sabran. The text records that the father of Adi, named Musafir, was "of the Taïrahite Kurds" who passed the summer at Zozan and descended in winter to the region of Mosul. The text describes Adi's people, the Yazidis, as a branch of the Taïrahite Kurds.

The chiefs of the monastery's shepherds were the two parents of Adi. When his parents left to accompany the flocks to Zozan, they left Adi, then four years old, at the monastery. There he gradually learned Chaldean and Arabic, and learned to read. Adi married the daughter of a wealthy and prominent Tartar, and was appointed in charge of the monastery's affairs by the superior. Through this position Adi became wealthy, gained renown, and won "the affection and esteem" of the monastery's superiors and of the great men and notables of his time. His generosity and munificence toward them are noted.

The Yazidis, described as Adi's ancestral tribe, followed his parents in their seasonal movements between Zozan and Mosul and were regarded as the servants of Adi's family. Each year at the beginning of November, when the Yazidis descended from Zozan, they would pass by Adi's residence "with rich presents and gifts," and Adi rewarded them with food, drink, and "feasts of every kind," as these people "loved drink excessively." The Yazidis numbered approximately 650 tents, not counting the men of Adi who were Muslims, and the Taïrahite Kurds, who numbered more than 1,000 tents.

Relations deteriorated after Adi's sons married Mongol-Tartar women and troubled the monastery, leading the superior to strip Adi of the administration of villages and mills. The manuscript remarks that "the traitor Adi did much harm to the monks without anyone rebuking or dissuading him." The superior eventually reprimanded Adi severely and threatened to bring charges against him in the city before the judges. Adi then stole a monastery mule, harassed the monks continuously, and, taking advantage of the superior's annual pilgrimage to Jerusalem, massacred all the monks, pillaged the monastery, and installed his entire family there as its exclusive masters. When the superior returned and demanded the monastery's return, Adi replied: "It is by the sword that I became its master and not by inheritance." The superior traveled to the Mongol court in Persia in torn garments with ashes on his head; the Mongol emir Tuman was subsequently dispatched, summoned Adi and had him taken to Maragha where he was judged and executed in November, at a date no earlier than 1223.

Scholars consider the Monk Ramisho manuscript to be a forgery on several grounds. The figure active in 1219 cannot be Sheikh Adi, who lived until 1162, but is identified by Açikyildiz as Adi II, son of the first successor Abi'l-Barakat, who was executed by the Mongols in 1221. The described location of the monastery does not correspond to the location of the sanctuary of Sheikh Adi at Lalish, and the manuscripts describe only the monastery becoming the family seat rather than a religious sanctuary. According to Kreyenbroek, the account derives from Bar Hebraeus's description of the seizure of a different monastery by a man named Michael in 1256–57. Guest notes that the text "conflicts with the accounts of contemporary chroniclers" at numerous points and was copied by Alpheus Andrus in 1912 and rediscovered by Père Anastase in 1922 before being widely assessed as a forgery. Mingana attributed the authorship of forged Yazidi-related texts generally to Jeremiah Shamir, a former monk from the Rabban Hormuzd monastery in Alqosh.

== Attributed writings ==
A corpus of Yazidi sacred texts attributed directly to Sheikh Adi has been preserved orally by the Qawals and in Yazidi mišūr manuscripts, the earliest of which dates to 604 AH / 1207–1208 CE. The main corpus of Islamic-tradition writings survives in two Berlin codices, We 1743 and We 1769, and one British Museum codex (Or. 7596). The Berlin codex We 1743, the most important, was copied in 915 AH / 1509 CE in Damascus by a scribe who names himself Sheikh Mohammed ben Ahmed al-Adawi, a member of the Adawiyya.

=== Qasida of Sheikh Adi (Qesîda Şîxadî) ===
The Qasida of Sheikh Adi (Qesîda Şîxadî) is a Yazidi religious poem in Arabic attributed to Sheikh Adi ibn Musafir, composed in the first person throughout, preserved in the oldest Yazidi documents (mišūrs) dating back to the 13th century and held in high regard by Yazidis. It was first published in the West by H. Ewald in 1853 and is preserved in the Yazidi mišūr manuscript tradition from at least the 13th century, where it is attested in the Mišūr of P'īr Xatīb Pisī, published by Omarkhali.

The Qasida is composed in the first person throughout, with Sheikh Adi speaking as its narrator. Its most significant verses are:

8. I am the ruling power preceding all that exist. (…)

13. And I am he that spread over the heavens their height. (…)

25. I am he that caused Adam to dwell in Paradise. (…)

49. And I am he to whom the Lord of heaven hath said,

50. Thou art the just Judge and Ruler of the earth. (…)

57. And I am ʿAdi ash-Shami, the son of Musafir.

58. Verily the All-Merciful has assigned unto me names,

59. The heavenly throne, and the seat, and the [seven] heavens, and the earth.

60. In the secret of my knowledge there is no God but me.

The Qasida furthermore contains a promise of paradise to all faithful followers of Sheikh Adi: "Exalted paradise is prepared for those invited by me." Its verses declare: "I own everything in the world, I rule all of creation, from me all the world depends, to my will it is subject"; "I am the source of truth, the one who spoke the word of truth, I have given the universe an immutable law"; "I am God, I determine the fate of every creature, and the lot of all living things is determined by me alone."

=== Qasida Safa Waqti (Qasīdā Safā Waqtī) ===
Qasida Safa Waqti (Arabic: قصيدة صفا وقتي, "The Time of Mine Has Been Purified") is a religious poem in Arabic attributed to Sheikh Adi ibn Musafir and preserved in two distinct forms: a written version found in the margins of the Mišūr of P'īr Sīnī Bahrī, and an oral version transmitted continuously by the Qawals of Bashiqa and Bahzani in Iraq.

The written version of the Qasida is found in the margins of the oldest surviving copy of the Mišūr of P'īr Sīnī Bahrī dated to 1207–1208 CE. Although the marginal text of the original manuscript copy is only partially preserved due to the decay of the document, analysis of legible fragments confirmed its identity as Qasida Safa Waqti. The same text was also found in the margins of a later copy of the same mišūr rewritten in 1083 AH / 1672–1673 CE. The text of the Qasida is composed in the Yazidi Arabic dialect of Bashiqa and Bahzani. It was first published in the West by Rudolf Frank in his 1911 dissertation Scheich 'Adî, der grosse Heilige der Jezîdîs. Pirbari, Mossaki, and Yezdin (2019) published both the Frank version and the previously unpublished oral version as recorded from Qawal Hussein's son, Qawal Ilyas, in 2017, noting minor differences between the two that are "unlikely to have special historical significance."

The Qasida opens with the narrator describing a state of spiritual purification and a happiness granted to him "from the Lord of the Lord." He recalls being formed and instructed even while still in his mother's womb, guided there by his own sheikh, and states that forty perfect men were present at the moment of his birth. The house of his birth is associated with blessing and with surr. The oral Qawal version additionally has the speaker describe attaining the rank of qutb ("axis" or "pole") and keeping vigil through the night.

The poem then describes a visit from saints or holy men who come riding on lions to challenge the speaker's spiritual state. Among them the text names "Qādir" and "Ibn Rifai", generally read as references to ʿAbd al-Qādir al-Jīlānī and Ahmad ar-Rifāʿī, founders of major Sufi orders, together with a figure called Abu al-Wafa. The two versions diverge somewhat in the episode that follows: the Frank version has the speaker facing a serpent and striking it with a spear, after which water issues from its mouth, while the oral Qawal version instead has him striking the ground with a staff and commanding it to yield water. Both versions close with the speaker naming himself — "the son of Musafir" in the written version, "the Syrian" in the Frank one — and identifying himself as ʿAdi, followed by an appeal to his Murids to remain devoted to him.

=== Beled Sinjar manuscripts ===
A further body of writings attributed to Sheikh Adi ibn Musafir survives in manuscripts discovered in 1934 in Beled Sinjar (present-day Sinjar, northern Iraq) by the Lebanese scholar Anis Frayha, who published them under the title "New Yezīdī Texts from Beled Sinjār, 'Iraq" in the Journal of the American Oriental Society in 1946. Frayha's manuscripts included, among other material, fragments of a text he titled the Book of the Ethiopians, which contained accounts of Yazidi history, legends, holy men, and poems attributed to Sheikh Adi.

Among the texts attributed to Sheikh Adi in the Beled Sinjar manuscripts are a series of statements expressed in the first person and containing themes of divine self-identification, pre-existence, and ontological primacy. Artur Rodziewicz cites these passages directly, noting that they express "similar pantheistic motifs" to those found in the Qasida of Sheikh Adi preserved in the mišūr tradition. The passages read:

"I am my essence; out of my essence existence came with its marvel. (…)

I am the First before whom there was no one in the beginning nor in the end. (…)

I am the ʿAdī of yesterday, of the day before yesterday, of today, of the past, and of what is to come.

I am, all in all; (…) you are in my mind and in my sight. (…)

Behold, I am you. (…)

I am the light of lights, he knows me by my light; I am a light of your lights, you love me.

I am the soul of souls, he who knows knows me.

I existed before both heavens and earth, before Adam; all of these are my creations."

=== Berlin codices ===
Four prose works attributed to Sheikh Adi are preserved in the Berlin manuscript collection (Kodex We 1743, copied in Damascus in 915 AH / 1509 CE), all of which had their author's name systematically replaced with that of Ahmed ibn al-Rifai by an unknown hand, except at fol. 43a, where he is identified as "Adi bin Musafir bin Ismail bin Musa, the Umayyad." Frank concludes the substitution was carried out by "a Muslim who took offense at it, knowing how dear that name was to the Yazidis," and notes the falsifier left the texts otherwise intact, finding nothing objectionable in their content. The colophon at fol. 49b, which covers all four prose works together as a single scribal unit, records that the entire codex was copied in 915 AH / 1509 CE in Damascus by Sheikh Mohammed ibn Ahmed al-Adawi.

==== I'tiqad Ahl al-Sunna ====
The largest and most theologically substantial of the four is the Kitab I'tiqad Ahl al-Sunna ("Creed of the Sunni Orthodox"), covering three subjects in sequence: the doctrine of God, the doctrine of faith, and the doctrine of last things. On God, the work opens with the affirmation of divine unity and absoluteness, holding that the essence of God cannot be fathomed by human reason, and proposes two paths to knowledge of God: the path of hearing (sam), meaning acceptance of the Quran and Hadith, and the path of reason ('aql), meaning reflection grounded in scripture. On faith, it affirms the Quran as the word of God and the Sunna as binding, takes a strictly orthodox position affirming the first three Caliphs, and rejects the Qadarite sect. On last things, it enumerates the resurrection, the narrow grave, judgment, the scales of justice, the intercession of Mohammed, paradise and hellfire, closing with the hadith on the division of the community into seventy-three sects.

The Kitab I'tiqad Ahl al-Sunna is described in the manuscript itself as orally delivered by Sheikh Adi and committed to writing after a chain of Islamic transmission (isnād) spanning over a century. According to the colophon of the manuscript, Sheikh Adi dictated the text orally; it was then transmitted by the Islamic scholar Muhammad ibn Ahmad ibn Abi Bakr al-Qurashi, who passed it to the Islamic scholar and educator Burhan al-Din Abu Bakr ibn Muhammad ibn Khalil, teacher at the Madrasa of Sheikh Abu Tahir in the Hakkari region. It was finally copied and recorded in written form by the Islamic scholar and jurist Yusuf ibn Muhammad ibn Yusuf al-Hakkari al-Shafi'i in Jumada al-Akhira of 669 AH (approximately 1270–1271 CE), 112 to 114 years after Sheikh Adi's death (recorded variously as 555 or 557 AH).

The copyist Yusuf al-Hakkari is described as a Shafi'i jurist who studied under, among others, the Hanbali scholar Izz al-Din Abd al-Razzaq al-Rasʿani (589–660 AH) and various Shafi'i scholars in the Hakkari and Mosul regions; his student Isa al-Hakkari is similarly described as "the Shafi'i jurist and scholar." A student of Yusuf, the Shafi'i jurist 'Isa ibn Abi Bakr ibn Muhammad al-Hakkari, also read the manuscript back to Yusuf in multiple sessions from 669 AH onward.

The manuscript was published in a critical edition in 1998 by Hamdi 'Abd al-Majid al-Salafi and Tahsin Ibrahim al-Dawski, based on this single surviving Hakkari manuscript, after the editors determined that a previously circulating printed version (published 1395 AH, based on a manuscript found in a Mosul madrasa) contained significant textual corruptions and interpolations. The editors note that the entire chain of transmission consists of Sunni Muslim scholars and jurists, and that the text was copied and authenticated within Islamic scholarly networks, with no direct autograph by Sheikh Adi surviving.

==== Kitab fihi dhikr adab al-nafs ====
The second work is titled Kitāb fīhi dhikr adab an-nafs ("Book Treating the Cultivation of the Soul"). As in the I'tiqad, the author's name is replaced throughout with that of Ahmed ibn al-Rifai, with the exception of fol. 47a, where the name "Sheikh Adi" was left uncorrected. The work opens with a list of ten qualities the pious (as-salihun) should cultivate and ten they should avoid, the first of the prohibited qualities being bid'a (religious innovation). Notably, the text warns against both hypocritical and sincere invocations of God's name, a detail Frank compares to practices found in Bektashi dervish orders. It continues with an enumeration of spiritual gifts received at death and in the afterlife from various figures of Islamic eschatology: the angel of death Izra'il, the grave, the two angels of the grave Munkar and Nakir, the scales of judgment, the Sirat bridge, the angel of hell Malik, the angel of paradise Ridwan, the houris, the Prophet, and God himself — before a series of longer exhortatory passages on ascetic self-discipline.

The work concludes with a description of mystical ecstasy as a flight to God. Frank notes that the work ends with a prayer-wish composed by "the one who, on behalf of Sheikh Adi, and probably also after his dictation, wrote it down and published it," described as "apparently a disciple of the Sheikh." Frank characterizes the Sufism of this work as popular in character, in the manner of al-Ghazali's Ihya, and somewhat less refined than the ideas it draws on.

==== Wasaya al-Sheikh Adi ibn Musafir ila'l-khalifa ====
The third work, Wasāyā ash-Sheikh ʿAdī ibn Musāfir ila'l-khalīfa ("Exhortations of Sheikh Adi ibn Musafir to the Khalifa") is the briefest of the four. Frank notes that wasaya carries the sense of morally binding exhortations rather than strictly legal instructions. The author's name is again replaced with that of Ahmed ibn al-Rifai, though Frank notes the original "Sheikh Adi" remains clearly recognizable. The title as it appears in the manuscript includes the phrase "the rightly-guided one in Mecca" appended after "khalifa," the meaning of which Frank describes as unclear. The work exhorts its unnamed recipient toward contempt for worldly goods, right faith, and trust in God, though Frank notes "nothing truly original or noteworthy is expressed in the words of the Sheikh." The work closes with two standalone sayings of Sheikh Adi not directly connected to the main exhortation, including a warning against associating with miracle-workers who deviate into bid'a.

==== Wasaya li-muridhi al-Sheikh Qaid wa-li-sa'ir al-muridin ====
The fourth and final prose work in the codex, Wasāyā li-murīdihī ash-Sheikh Qaid wa-li-sā'ir al-murīdīn ("Exhortations to his Disciple Sheikh Qaid and to the Other Disciples"), occupies fols. 48b–49b. The author's name has again been replaced with that of Ahmed ibn al-Rifai, though Frank notes the original remains detectable. The work is addressed to Sheikh Qaid, identified as Qaid al-Nuri, named among the forty known disciples of Sheikh Adi, and to the wider circle of disciples. It opens with exhortations to fear God, fulfill divine law, and avoid those whose concern is worldly goods, passion, and desire, supported by Quranic citations. Guidance on Sufi conduct follows, including a saying attributed to Jesus: "O disciples, let your bellies hunger and your livers thirst and bare your bodies, and you will behold God the Exalted." Frank summarizes: "a Sufi speaks here to his disciples."

==== Qasida I (Berlin Codex We 1743, fol. 27b) ====
The first and most substantial of the Berlin qasidas, it is also the most thoroughly falsified of all the writings in the codex: unlike the prose works, where only the author's name was replaced, here both Sheikh Adi's name and most other proper names occurring in the poem were substituted with others, and so carefully, Frank notes, that the original names are no longer recoverable. The poem is Sufi in content: the beloved is God, who offers the yearning mystic a cup of mystical wine, after which the mystic falls into ecstasy and feels himself lord of all creation, to whom kings, angels and saints do homage. Frank describes the poem as rising in places to "great poetic power." One half-verse matches word for word a line from a qasida by Abd al-Qadir Gilani, Sheikh Adi's close contemporary and associate; Frank observes that the same excess of Sufi rhetorical style found in the poem appears equally in Gilani's own writings. The poem closes as a tribute to the Prophet.

The primary evidence for the authenticity of Qasida I is external: several of its half-verses appear in British Museum Codex Or. 7596 attributed to Sheikh Adi without any name substitution, representing an independent manuscript tradition. Frank calls this "weighty external evidence for the authenticity of Qasida I."

==== Qasida II (Berlin Codex We 1743, fol. 28a) ====
The second qasida is only five verses long. Like Qasida I, both the author's name and most other proper names have been replaced. Its Sufi content describes the special station of the mystic elevated above ordinary men, again centering on the mystical wine and the beloved (God). Frank states that the question of authenticity for both Berlin qasidas "could only be answered with some certainty with precise knowledge of 12th-century Sufi poetry," but notes that the author of Qasida I can be regarded, on internal grounds, as the author of Qasida II as well.

==== Qasida III (Berlin Codex We 1769, fol. 106a) ====
In the third qasida, uniquely among all the Islamic-tradition manuscripts, Sheikh Adi's name is left unfalsified in both the title and the poem itself. The qasida of 19 Basit verses is found inserted within a collection compiled by the Shafi'i scholar Scheich esch-Schafuni, who lived around 1200 AH / 1785 CE and who addresses Sheikh Adi in his title as "Seijidi" — the term disciples use for their sheikh. Frank notes that the Adawiyya order having survived into the 18th century is "at least not proven by external evidence."

The qasida is notable for two details found nowhere else in the source literature. It is the only text to name Sheikh Adi's mother, recorded here as Yezda. It also narrates two miracles, a riding-a-rock miracle and a snake miracle, which Frank observes "strikingly have no parallel in the rich garland of Sheikh Adi legends furnished by the Manaqib literature." Frank describes the poem as formally inferior to Qasidas I and II, noting considerable metrical uncertainty and various vulgarisms. He nonetheless identifies numerous connections between all three Berlin qasidas: the opening and closing verses of Qasida III echo specific passages in Qasida I, three saints named in Qasida I reappear in Qasida III, and mystical wine plays a significant role in all three.

=== British Museum Codex ===
British Museum Codex Or. 7596 contains two qasidas attributed to Sheikh Adi. The first, Qasida IV, comprises 14 Wafir verses. Frank notes that its greatest part treats exactly the same content as Qasida III, while its final three verses correspond to several half-verses of Qasida I. He concludes on repeated reading that both Qasidas III and IV are by the same author, with Qasida III as the original and Qasida IV a later smoother revision. Qasida IV also contains the line "I am the celibate," consistent with the historical record that Sheikh Adi remained unmarried throughout his life.

The second qasida, Qasida V, comprises 8 Tawil verses. Its Sufi content recalls Qasida I in particular. Its opening lines include the verse: "My drinking companion was the most exalted of the prophets, Ahmed."

== See also ==
- List of Yazidi holy figures
- List of people who have been considered deities
- Incarnation
- List of Kurdish philosophers
