= Tawûsî Melek =

Angelic Being, one of the central figures of Yazidism

- Lord of this World, Leader of the Heptad
- Member of the Heptad
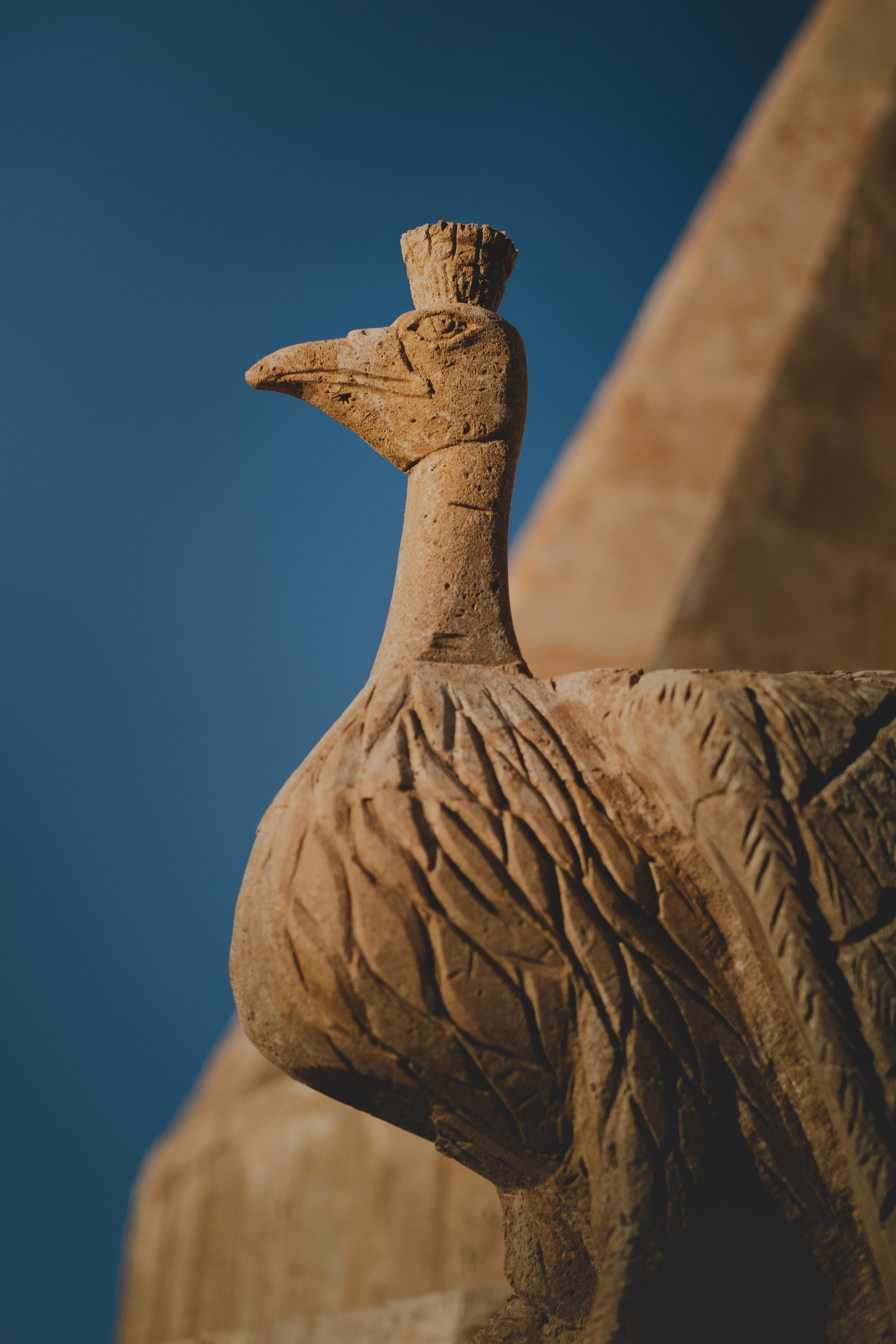
- Peacock statue on Sharfadin Temple in Sinjar, Iraq
- Other names: Tawûsî Mêran
- Venerated in: Yazidism and Yarsanism
- Symbols: Peacock, Light, Rainbow, Sencaq
- Region: Kurdistan
- Ethnic group: Kurds (Yazidis and Yarsanis)
- Festivals: Yazidi New Year, sometimes also called Cejna Tawûsî Melek (Feast of Tawûsî Melek)

Tawûsî Melek or Melek Taûs (Note: also known as Melekê Tawûs and Tawûsê Melek.) (Kurdish: تاوسی مەلەک, romanized: Tawûsî Melek, lit. 'Peacock Angel') is one of the central figures of Yazidism. In Yazidi creation stories, before the creation of this world, God created seven Divine Beings, of whom Tawûsî Melek was appointed as the leader. God assigned all of the world's affairs to these seven Divine Beings, also often referred to as the Seven Angels or heft sirr ("the Seven Mysteries").

In Yazidi beliefs, Tawûsî Melek, the Lord of this World, is responsible for all that happens on this world, both good and bad. According to religious tradition, Nature, with its myriad phenomena of light and darkness, emanates from a single source, that is Tawûsî Melek. Qewl passages emphasize Tawûsî Melek's power on the earth, in the sky, sea, on the mountains, and their residents, that is, his power exists in all parts of nature, whether celestial or terrestrial.

== Religious significance ==
=== Tawûsî Melek in Yazidi beliefs and mythology ===
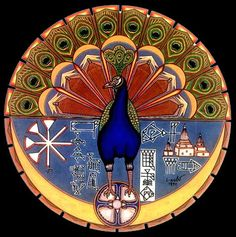
Melek Taûs, the Peacock Angel. This emblem features Tawûsî Melek in the center, the Sumerian diĝir on the left, and the domes above Sheikh 'Adī's tomb on the right.

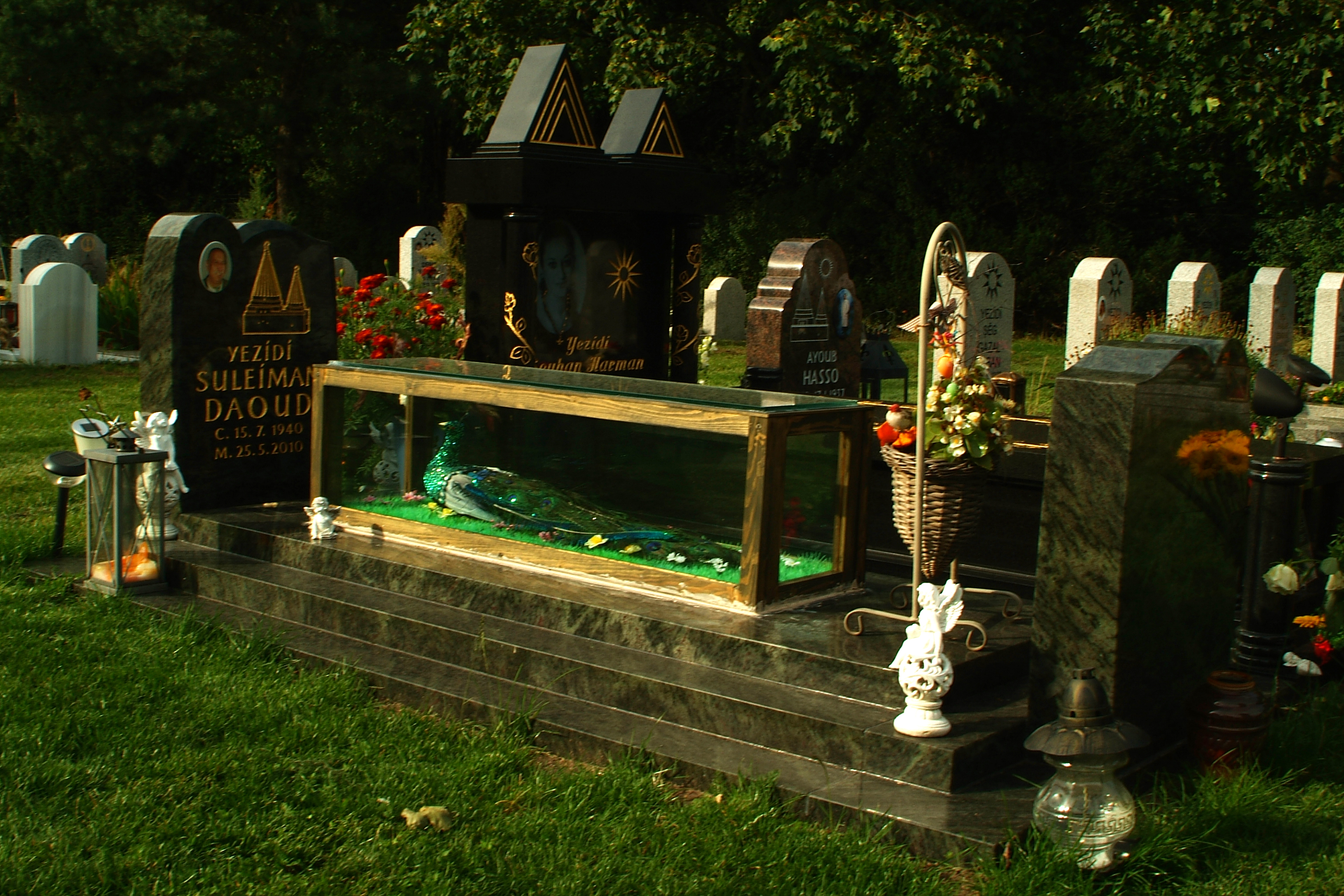
Tawûsî Melek depicted as a peacock inside the display case on the grave of a Yazidi believer, cemetery of the Yazidi community in Hannover.

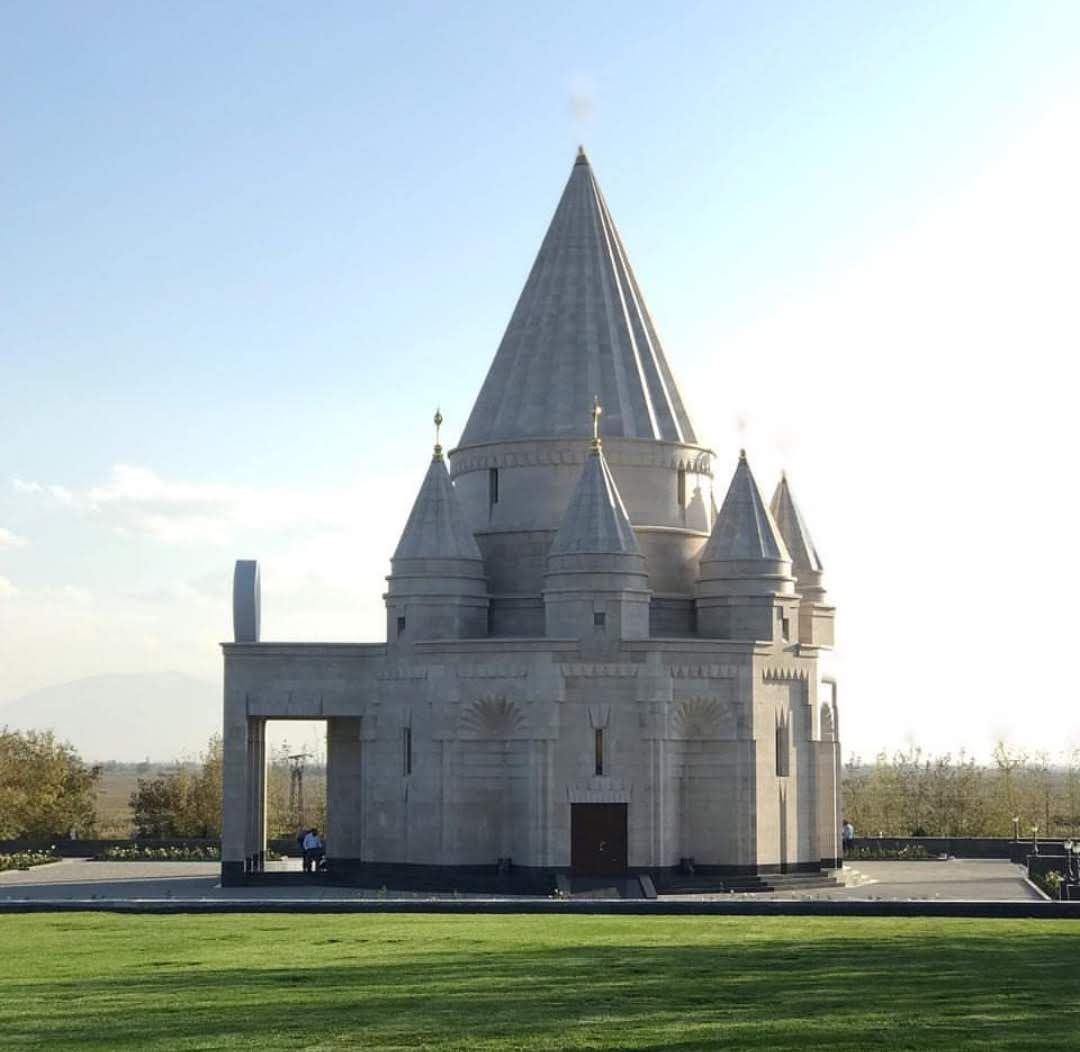
Quba Mere Diwane is the largest temple of the Yazidis in the world, located in the Armenian village of Aknalich. The temple is dedicated to Melek Taûs and the Seven Angels of Yazidi theology.

The Yazidis consider Tawûsî Melek an emanation of God who is a good, benevolent angel and leader of the archangels, who was entrusted to take care of the world after he passed a test and created the cosmos from the Cosmic egg. Yazidis believe that Tawûsî Melek is not a source of evil or wickedness. They consider him to be the leader of the archangels, not a fallen nor a disgraced angel, but an emanation of God himself. The Yazidis believe that the founder or reformer of their religion, Sheikh Adi Ibn Musafir, was an incarnation of Tawûsî Melek.

In Yazidi religious folk beliefs, Tawûsî Melek is described as eternal and an eternal light (Tawûsî Melek herhey ye û nûra baqî ye), and in Yazidi mythology, when Tawûsî Melek descended to earth, the seven colours of the rainbow transformed into a seven-coloured bird, the peacock, which flew around every part of earth to bless it, and its last resting place was in Lalish. Hence, in Yazidi mythology, the rainbow is linked with Tawûsî Melek and it is believed that he shows his blessing with the sign of rainbow.

The first Wednesday of Nîsan (Eastern April) every year is believed to coincide with Tawûsî Melek's descending to earth as light, bringing in the New Year with its joyous renewal of life on earth, when Nature burgeons forth anew in Spring. It therefore became the holy day upon which Sersal (Yazidi New Year) is celebrated. On the eve of the feast, 365/366 lamps are lit as the symbol of the descending of Tawûsî Melek to the earth. This number also corresponds to the number of the days in the year.

Yazidi accounts of the creation differ significantly from those of the Abrahamic religions (Judaism, Christianity, and Islam), since they are derived from the Ancient Mesopotamian and Indo-Iranian traditions; therefore, Yazidi cosmogony is closer to those of Ancient Iranian religions, Vedic Hinduism, Yarsanism and Zoroastrianism.

=== Symbolism of the Peacock in religious life ===
In Yazidism, the Peacock, the symbol or icon of Tawûsî Melek, is believed to represent the diversity of the World, the colourfulness of its feathers being considered to symbolise the myriad colours of Nature. The radiating feathers of the peacock’s tail, revealed when it unfurls them in circular display, are held to symbolise the rays of the sun, bestowing their life-giving light each day at dawn. It is therefore considered a sacred bird, which Yazidis are expressly forbidden to hunt, eat, curse or ill-treat in any way. For this reason countless peacock images are to be found adorning the preeminent sanctuary of Lalish and all manner of other Yazidi shrines and holy sites, as well as the homes of the Yazidi faithful and their social, cultural and academic centres.

== In Yarsanism ==
In Yarsanism, a religion that shares many similarities with Yazidism dating back to pre-Islam, there is also a figure referred to as Malak Tawus, whose identification is tied to the names of angels during various dowres (cycles), which denotes range of concepts. Malak Tawus is believed to be "pure and without sin, above and free of any bad actions, obedient and devoted to God and consisting of light." According to Yarsani doctrine, during the dowre of Shari'at, in which one is being guided by Islamic Law, Malak Tawus was labelled as Shaitan, whereas in the dowre of Haqiqat (Truth), Malak Tawus is called Dawud, who is one of the seven holy Beings in Yarsanism that are referred to as the Haft Tan. Thus, the Yarsanis do not curse Satan.

The term dowre may refer to a period of time that started with the Essences (zāt) of the Divine and of members of the two Heptads manifesting or incarnating themselves as humans. It also refers to a stage in humanity's religious development. The first and initial dowre was the stage of Shari'at, where the Islamic Law was or is in charge and guiding everyone. The Truth (Haqiqat) is thought to have existed during this stage, but had not yet been perceived. Following the dowre of Shari'at were the intermediate dowres of Tariqat, i.e. the 'Path' of a mystical Order, and Ma'refat, i.e. Esoteric Knowledge. The former was marked by the development of mystical brotherhoods that allowed people to start learning about esoteric truth. These stages were succeeded by the present dowre of Haqiqat, which is marked by Sultan Sahak's arrival. The dowre of Haqiqat is the phase of development in which the advanced mystic fully has perceived the esoteric Truth. Yarsanis are thought to be living in this dowre, however, the same is not true for all humans, and most outsiders are still believed to remain in the dowre of Shari'at or the intermediate dowres of Tariqat and Ma'refat.

== Accusations of devil-worship ==
Muslims and followers of other Abrahamic religions have erroneously associated and identified the Peacock Angel with their own conception of the unredeemed evil spirit Satan, a misconception which has incited centuries of violent religious persecution of the Yazidis as "devil-worshippers". Persecution of Yazidis has continued in their home communities within the borders of modern Iraq.

Some also claimed that Tawûsê Melek was a reference to Ahriman, the evil figure in Zoroastrianism, who had created a peacock to prove that he was also capable of good.

Further accusations were derived from narratives attributed to Melek Taûs, which are actually foreign to Yazidism and probably introduced by either Muslims in the 9th century or Christian missionaries in the 20th century. Accusations of devil-worship fueled centuries of violent religious persecution, which have led Yazidi communities to concentrate in remote mountainous regions of northwestern Iraq. The Yazidi taboo against the Arabic word Shaitan (الشیطان) and on similar-sounding words containing the consonants š (sh) and t/ṭ have been used to suggest a connection between Tawûsî Melek and Iblis, although no evidence exists to suggest that Yazidis worship Tawûsî Melek as the same figure. Yazidis did not have the same concept of Satan as Abrahamic religions.

According to Yazidi belief, mentioning the names or epithets used by other faiths for the "evil spirit" is considered sinful, as doing so implies acknowledgement of evil as an independent entity, which would diminish God's omnipotence. Because Yazidis historically avoided gatherings where such figures were cursed or condemned, outside observers mistook this avoidance for veneration, generating misconceptions that in turn fueled persecution. Yazidi theological thought holds that humans themselves constructed the concept of a devil figure to externalize responsibility for their own moral failings, while God granted humanity free will and the capacity to distinguish right from wrong.

Furthermore, Yazidis do not believe Tawûsî Melek to be a source of evil or wickedness. They consider him to be the leader of the archangels, not a fallen angel. In Mishefa Resh, Tawûsî Melek is equated with Ezrayil or Ezazil.

== See also ==
- Index of articles related to the Yezidis
- Sultan Ezid
- List of angels in theology
- List of Yazidi holy figures
- List of Yazidi holy places
- List of Yazidi settlements
- Yazidism
- Yazidis
- Yarsanism

== General bibliography ==
- Açıkyıldız, Birgül (2014). The Yezidis: The History of a Community, Culture and Religion. London: I.B. Tauris & Company. ISBN 978-1-784-53216-1. OCLC 888467694.
- Asatrian, Garnik S.; Arakelova, Victoria (2014). "Part I: The One God - Malak-Tāwūs: The Leader of the Triad". The Religion of the Peacock Angel: The Yezidis and Their Spirit World. Gnostica. Abingdon, Oxfordshire: Routledge. pp. 1–28. doi:10.4324/9781315728896. ISBN 978-1-84465-761-2. OCLC 931029996.
- Asatrian, Garnik S.; Arakelova, Victoria (January 2003). Asatrian, Garnik S. (ed.). "Malak-Tāwūs: The Peacock Angel of the Yezidis". Iran and the Caucasus. 7 (1–2). Leiden: Brill Publishers in collaboration with the Caucasian Centre for Iranian Studies (Yerevan): 1–36. doi:10.1163/157338403X00015. eISSN 1573-384X. ISSN 1609-8498. JSTOR 4030968. LCCN 2001227055. OCLC 233145721.
- Rodziewicz, Artur (December 2016). Asatrian, Garnik S. (ed.). "And the Pearl Became an Egg: The Yezidi Red Wednesday and Its Cosmogonic Background". Iran and the Caucasus. 20 (3–4). Leiden: Brill Publishers in collaboration with the Caucasian Centre for Iranian Studies (Yerevan): 347–367. doi:10.1163/1573384X-20160306. eISSN 1573-384X. ISSN 1609-8498. JSTOR 44631092. LCCN 2001227055. OCLC 233145721.
- Rodziewicz, Artur (2022). Delphine Lauritzen (ed.). „Heft Sur – The Seven Angels of the Yezidi Tradition and Harran”, in: Travaux et Mémoires, tome XXV/2: Inventer les anges de l’Antiquité à Byzance. pp. 637–744. Paris: Collège de France, Centre d’Histoire et Civilisation de Byzance. ISSN 0577‑1471.
- Sfameni Gasparro, Giulia (April 1975). Feldt, Laura; Valk, Ülo (eds.). "I Miti Cosmogonici degli Yezidi". Numen (in Italian). 22 (1). Leiden: Brill Publishers: 24–41. doi:10.1163/156852775X00112. eISSN 1568-5276. ISSN 0029-5973. JSTOR 3269532. LCCN 58046229. OCLC 50557232.
- Sfameni Gasparro, Giulia (December 1974). Feldt, Laura; Valk, Ülo (eds.). "I Miti Cosmogonici degli Yezidi". Numen (in Italian). 21 (3). Leiden: Brill Publishers: 197–227. doi:10.1163/156852774X00113. eISSN 1568-5276. ISSN 0029-5973. JSTOR 3269773. LCCN 58046229. OCLC 50557232.
- Hamzee, M. Rezaa (1990), The Yaresan : a sociological, historical, and religio-historical study of a Kurdish community, Islamkundliche Untersuchungen (75)
