= Sheikh Hasan ibn Sheikh Adi II =

Yazidi saint

Melik Şêxsin
- The Master of the Pen
- Member of the Heptad
- Venerated in: Yazidism
- Symbols: The Pen, writing and books
- Region: Kurdistan
- Ethnic group: Kurds (Yazidis)

Sheikh Hasan ibn Sheikh Adi II
- Died: 1254; Kurdistan
- Occupation: Religious leader
- Era: late Abbasid era and Mongol Empire
- Predecessor: Sheikh Adi II ibn Sakhr Bin Barakat
- Successor: Sharaf ad-Dīn ibn al-Hasan
- Children: Şêx Brahîmê Xetimî; Şêxê Êtîma; Şêx Mûsê Sor; Şêx Şerfedîn; Şêx Zêndîn; Sitiya Gul
- Father: Sheikh Adi II ibn Sakhr Bin Barakat
- Family: Adani

Sheikh Hasan ibn Sheikh ‘Adī II (Kurdish: Şêx Hesen or Şêx Sin) is a holy and historical figure who is revered in Yazidism and considered the physical or earthly incarnation of Sheikh Hasan ibn Sheikh Adi II, known as Melik Şêxsin, one of the Seven Divine Beings to whom God assigned the world's affairs. Melik Şêxsin is associated with the Pen and consequently with writing and books, he is thus called Xudanê Qelemê 'Master of the Pen'. Adani sheikhs are the descendants of Sheikh Hasan and were traditionally the only ones in Yazidi society that had the privilege to acquire the art of writing and reading.

== Historical biography ==
Şêx Hesen was the son of Sheikh Adi II, who was the son of Abu Sakhr ibn Barakat. The Yazidis enjoyed a widespread geographical and political authority during the reign of Şêx Hesen and under his term of office, traditional Kurdish beliefs and myths began to reassert themselves as part of the local religious tradition and eventually became an integral part of the community's culture.

More significantly, the growing political influence of Şêx Hesen and the Adawiyya community which was dominated by local Kurds led to unease amongst their neighbors. The result of this was a crackdown on the community, and under the order of the Atabeg of Mosul, Badr al-Din Lu'lu', Şêx Hesen and two hundred of his followers were executed. The execution of Şêx Hesen marked the beginning of a huge military campaign against the Yazidis in 652 AH/1254 CE. The forces of Badr al-Din Luʾluʾ entered the temple of Lalish, had the bones of Sheikh Adi exhumed and burned. They crucified and killed the captive Yazidis whom they found in the temple. In response, Yazidis regained control of Hakkari and the Bahdinan region which included Dasin Mount, from Badr al-Din's forces during the reign of Şêx Hesen's successor, Sharfadin. However, this triumph was short-lived, as Sharfadin was killed by the invading Mongols in 652 AH/ 1257 CE.

== Works ==
- The Book of Illumination for the People of Solitude
