= November 2015 Sinjar offensive =

Operation in Iraq War

- Part of the War in Iraq (2013–2017), the Spillover of the Syrian civil war, and the US-led intervention in Iraq (2014–2021)
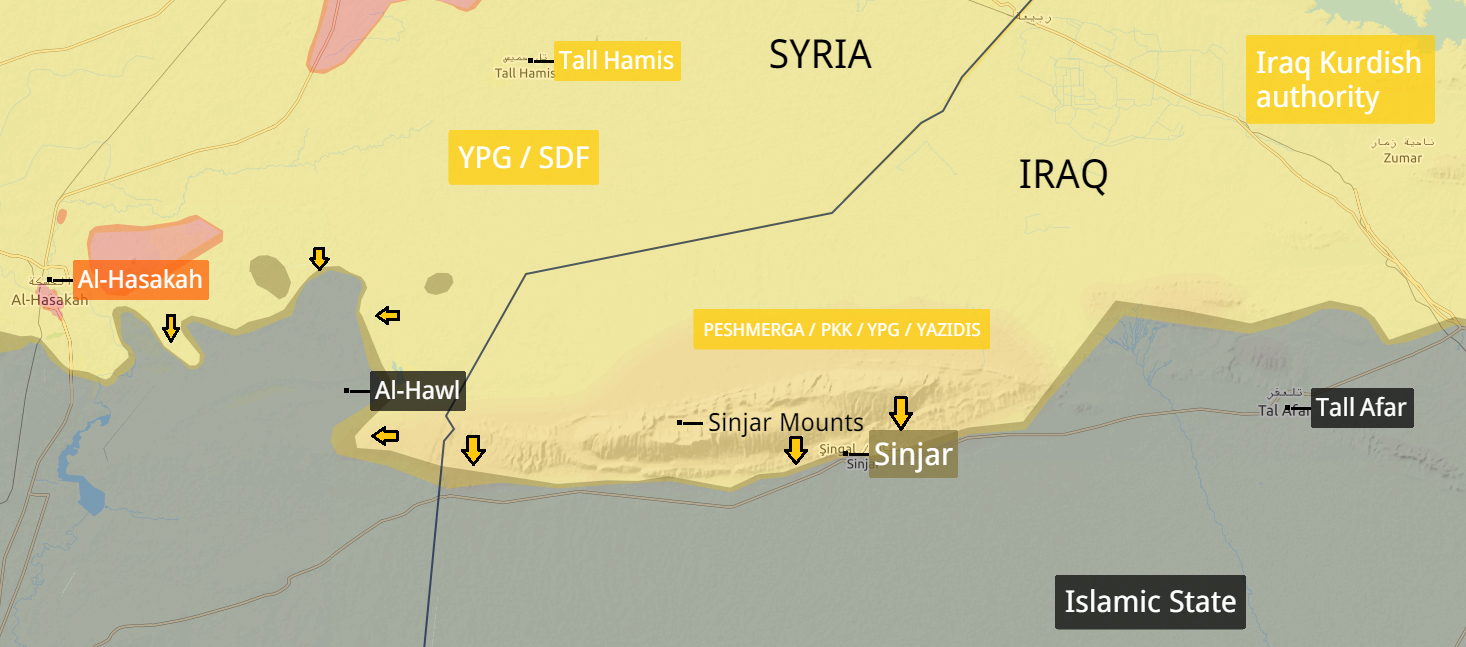
- Map of the concurrent offensives in al-Hawl and Sinjar, on 12 November 2015
Date	12–15 November 2015 3 days)
Location	Nineveh Governorate, Iraq
Result	Kurdish and allies victory: Peshmerga and PKK forces capture Sinjar and Gabara; Kurdish/Peshmerga forces cut three roads leading to Sinjar and ISIL's main Mosul–Raqqa supply route

Belligerents
Kurdistan Region; Sinjar Alliance; PKK; Rojava; Supported by: CJTF–OIR Air support: United Kingdom; Canada; United States; MedEvac support: Iraq	Islamic State of Iraq and the Levant

Commanders and leaders
Masoud Barzani; Maj. Gen. Aziz Waisi; Maj. Gen. Mansour Barzani; Brig. Gen. Seme Mala Mohammed; Qasim Shesho (Commander of the Yazidi Peshmerga); Sheikh Alo (Duhok region commander); Gen. Zaim Ali (western area commander); Gen. Wahid Kovli (eastern area commander); Haydar Shesho (HPŞ chief commander); Mazlum Shengal (YBŞ chief commander); Berivan Arin (YJÊ chief commander); Murat Karayılan (PKK leader); İsmail Özden; Newroz Hatim † (PKK field commander); Sipan Hamo (YPG supreme commander)	(Islamic State) Abu Bakr al-Baghdadi; Abu Omar al-Shishani; Mullah Ghareeb al-Turkmani; Abu Askar al-Shammary; Abu Eisa al-Azeri; Abu Omar al-Uzbeki; Abu A'isha al-Juburi

Units involved
Kurdistan Region: Peshmerga; Zeravani; Sinjar Alliance: HPŞ; YBŞ; YJÊ; PKK: HPG; YJA-Star; MLKP; Rojava: YPG; YPJ; United States: U.S. Special Forces	Unknown

Strength
7,500+	~700 (in Sinjar city)

Casualties and losses
Unknown	300+ killed 300+ wounded and captured

The November Sinjar offensive was a combination of operations of Kurdish Peshmerga, PKK, and Yezidi militias in November 2015, to recapture the city of Sinjar from the Islamic State of Iraq and the Levant. It resulted in a decisive victory for the Kurdish forces, who expelled the ISIL militants from Sinjar and regained control of Highway 47, which until then had served as the major supply route between the ISIL strongholds of Raqqa and Mosul.

The offensive was code-named "The Fury of Melek Taus", in reference to Melek Taus, a figure from Yezidi religion.

== Background ==
In August 2014, the Islamic State of Iraq and the Levant launched an offensive in Northern Iraq and pushed into Kurdish held areas of Nineveh Governorate, capturing the city of Sinjar, among others.

In what is known as the Sinjar massacre, 2,000–5,000 Yazidis were killed in and around Sinjar, while 200,000 civilians fled. Amongst these, some 50,000 Yazidis fled to the Sinjar Mountains, located to the city's north, where they were facing starvation and dehydration. By the end of August, the majority of these 50,000 Yazidis were able to leave the mountains by crossing into Syria through a corridor opened by Syrian Kurdish forces, although several thousands stayed there.

While ISIL held onto Sinjar city and the southern entrance of the Sinjar Mountains, they seized further terrain north of the mountains on 21 October 2014, thereby cutting the area's escape route to Kurdish areas. Yazidi militias who were securing the holy Sherfedîn shrine, had to withdraw into the Sinjar Mountains. The number of Yazidi civilian refugees was estimated at 2,000–7,000. An American source called this new situation a partial ISIL "siege" of the mountain range.

In the course of a first, six-day-long offensive in December 2014, Iraqi Kurdish Peshmerga took control over a part of the city of Sinjar and parts of the mountains, and expanded their offensive on to Tal Afar. In early 2015, Kurdish forces also pushed closer to the City of Mosul in the Mosul offensive.

== The offensive ==
=== First day ===
On 12 November 2015, over 7,500 Kurdish fighters, backed by the US-led coalition, began their offensive to retake Sinjar. Kurdish sources reported that they captured the village of Gabara and also had cut the highway between Sinjar and Syria. According to a Peshmerga official, U.S. and British special forces were also participating in the offensive. According to the same sources, 16 ISIL suicide attacks were thwarted. Later, it was reported that K forces had cut the Sinjar-Baiji and Sinjar-Tal Afar highways, effectively besieging ISIL in Sinjar. A Peshmerga commander hinted that no prisoners would be taken during the operation. ISIL counter-attacked in the western part of Sinjar, while hundreds of Peshmerga were waiting to be deployed in battle. Kurdish forces had secured the wheat silo, cement factory, hospital and several other public buildings in the northern part of the city, with reports that ISIL had fled Sinjar prior to the offensive. However, a Peshmerga official expressed his concern about possible suicide bombers remaining within the city. Kurdish forces also secured 150 square kilometres (60 square miles) of territory around Sinjar from ISIL.

At least 30 airstrikes by American warplanes, intended to soften up ISIL's military positions and uproot its fighters, were reported to have occurred on Thursday before the ground attack.

=== Second day: The retaking of Sinjar city ===
On the morning of 13 November 2015, the operation's second day, a Kurdish force including Syrian Kurdish YPG forces and Gerila forces of the HPG advanced to the city center from the west. There they were joined by Iraqi Kurdish Peshmerga forces advancing from the east, including the Iraqi Kurdish Zeravani led by Major General Aziz Waisi and independent Yazidi forces led by Heydar Shesho. Subsequently, a stream of armed personnel carriers, Humvees, SUVs and light trucks were moved into the city. With a U.S. A-10 aircraft circling over the city, they took control of the city.

Filmmaker Carsten Stormer, who was embedded with the western frontline, reported they didn't face any fighting from the side of the Islamic State: "There was no resistance — I mean zero." He also confirmed the PKK-affiliated troops arrived first in this section, only then to be joined by the Peshmerga. According to The Economist, "IS forces reportedly pulled out of the town after two days of intense fighting, allowing the Peshmerga to walk in virtually unopposed on November 12th."

=== Third day ===
The next day, YBŞ and PKK units captured a number of strategically important villages west and south of Sinjar, most importantly Emdiban near the border to Syria. In course of these clashes, both ISIL as well as coalition forces suffered casualties; among them was the PKK field commander Newroz Hatim, who was killed near Midian village.

=== Coalition air support ===
During the whole week, Coalition aircraft had conducted over 250 airstrikes. Apart from U.S. aircraft, British Tornado GR4 and MQ-9 Reaper aircraft, operating from the Royal Air Force's Akrotiri base targeted ISIL positions near Sinjar and Tall Afar. CF-18 Hornet aircraft from the Royal Canadian Air Force were also reported to having contributed to the preparatory mission. Iraqi Security Force helicopters provided aerial MedEvac support conducting five casualty evacuations.

== Aftermath ==
=== Dispute over credit for winning the battle ===
Though the presence of PKK, YPG and the Yezidi Kurd militias participating in the Sinjar Alliance has been covered by Kurdistan TV Broadcaster Rûdaw, both Kurdistan prime minister Nechirvan Barzani and president Massoud Barzani claimed the capture of Sinjar exclusively for the KRG's Peshmerga forces. Haydar Shesho, commander of the Protection Force of Sinjar (HPŞ), who before had been allied with the KRG peshmerga, warned of a "war over flags" and referred to the next battle being "the abolition of the one-party dictatorship".

=== Discovery of Yazidi mass graves ===
Following the recapture, in Solagh, east of Sinjar city, Kurdish forces found a mass grave with the remains of at least 78 Yazidi women believed to be executed by ISIL militants. On 15 November 2015, yet another mass grave containing the remains of 50 Yezidi men was found at a place that used to be the Shingal Technical Institute's fish pond.

=== Allegations of retaliation against Sunni Muslim houses ===
According to witnesses, in an alleged act of retaliation, members of the Yazidi minority looted and burned Sunni Muslim houses following the recapture of the city. However, the report was denied by Kurdish Peshmerga security commanders, and could not be independently confirmed. In the course of the Islamic State's Northern Iraq offensive in August 2014, some Sunni inhabitants had allegedly identified local Yazidis to the militant jihadists, thereby enabling the following Sinjar massacre.

== See also ==
- American-led intervention in Iraq (2014–present)
- December 2014 Sinjar offensive
- 2015 Al-Hawl offensive
- Tishrin Dam offensive
- Al-Shaddadi offensive (2016)
- Fall of Mosul
- List of wars and battles involving the Islamic State of Iraq and the Levant
- Spillover of the Syrian Civil War
