= Sinjar Alliance =

Joint command of three Yazidi militias

- Fermandariya Hevbeş a Şengalê
- Flag of the Sinjar Alliance
- Dates active: October 2015–present
- Groups: Êzîdxan Women's Units; Sinjar Resistance Units; Êzîdxan Protection Force (Until March 2017)
- Headquarters: Sinjar,Iraq
- Wars: Kurdistan Workers' Party insurgency; War in Iraq (2013–2017); Syrian Civil War; Turkish military operation in Afrin

The Ezidkhan Command for Liberating Sinjar (Kurdish: Fermandariya Êzîdxana Ji Bo Rizgariya Şengalê), known as the Sinjar Alliance (Kurdish: Fermandariya Hevbeş a Şengalê, i.e. Sinjar Joint Command), is a joint command of two–initially three–Yazidi militias, the Sinjar Resistance Units (YBŞ), and the Êzîdxan Women's Units (YJÊ). Both of the remaining two militias are supported by the Kurdistan Workers' Party (PKK).

The alliance was originally created in October 2015 to protect the Yezidi community from ISIL attacks, after the August 2014 Sinjar massacre, and included the Êzîdxan Protection Force (HPŞ), which in fact provided the largest contingent of fighters (claiming at the time of the operation 5,000 fighters, including about 400 women). However, the HPŞ left the alliance in early 2017 due to ideological differences with the PKK-backed YBŞ and YJÊ. The Alliance aims to establish democratic confederalism in a Yazidi autonomous region in Sinjar.

== Sinjar Resistance Units (YBŞ) ==
The YBŞ is a militia that is made up of only Yazidi people, both men and women, with roots dating back to 2007. The YPG, a PKK affiliated militia known for its women fighters the YPJ, played a large role in the training of YBŞ forces. In the summer of 2015, the number of soldiers in the YBŞ totaled around 2,000 Yazidi men and women. This number continues to rise due to training by YPG and other support. The YBŞ assisted the YPG in all actions in Sinjar. In YBŞ' early existence it assisted in maintaining supply roads for HPS and YPG as a corridor was created for Yazidi safe passage out of Sinjar.

=== Sheikh Khairy Khedr ===
Sheikh Khairy Kedr was the first commander of the Sinjar Resistance Units (YBŞ ). He died fighting against ISIS during Sinjar massacre in 2014. He was an inspiration to the resistance, as he came from the Yazidi villages that were bombed in 2007 and spent much of his life resisting the IS. One soldier who fought alongside Sheikh Khairy Khedr stated, "all the men cried for Sheikh Khairy. They said, 'If we lose Sheikh Khairy, we will become 1,000 Sheikh Khairy's. We will resist'. Still, they cried'".

=== Zaki Shingali ===
Zaki Shingali led the YBŞ after Sheikh Khairy Kedr. Shingali died in 2018, just minutes after attending a vigil for those Yazidi's that lost their lives in the ISIS assault on Sinjar. His vehicle was hit by a Turkish airstrike. Ankara commented on his death, saying that it was a success and that one of the most wanted PKK militants had been killed. He was specifically targeted for his PKK and Kurdish roots by the Turkish government and had been identified as a senior PKK figure.

== Êzîdxan Women's Units (YJÊ) ==
The YJÊ (Êzîdxan Women's Units, "Yekinêyen Jinên Êzidxan") is a resistance unit composed of Yazidi women, many of whom are survivors of ISIS enslavement. Yazidi women and girls faced months, sometimes years of abuse from their ISIS captures. As a result, many of these women are at the forefront of the battle between ISIS and the Yazidis, "There is no one like them!" Joined by their female soldiers, the YPG, the YJÊ plays a crucial role in defending the Yazidi people from IS attacks.

=== Training ===
The YPG provides three months of ideological training to new recruits. Much of this ideology comes from the PKK and Abdullah Ocalan. This mainly consists of making them to "know who they are, what they are doing, what it is to be equal. It's easy to teach them to shoot, but psychologically".... YPG trains many survivors of ISIS captivity, stating: "Isis took those women and children because they wanted to destroy their honour. We help train the Yazidi women to defend themselves and then they can control their own future".

=== Group Politics ===
The founding goals of YJÊ were to defend Yazidi women's rights and Yazidi tradition as well as to protect Mount Sinjar. As time has passed, YJÊ ideology has taken on a much more global scope by using PKK rhetoric known as Jineology. Currently, YJÊ ideology maintains an aggressive stance; in 2017, YJÊ issued a statement: "We repeat over and over again that we are continuing our struggle and resistance anywhere for kidnapped Yazidi women and all oppressed women, we will hold the struggle flag high and continue our battle against all kinds of oppression and persecution wherever it existed".

== Sinjar Defense Units (HPS) ==
The HPS is one of the original three Yazidian resistance groups. It consisted of over 5,000 fighters, of which approximately 400 are women. HPS is led by Yazidian military commander, Haydar Shesho. In the initial attacks on Mount Sinjar, the HPS can be credited with protecting the Yazidis on Mount Sinjar as well as providing them with supplies to the best of their ability. The HPS did not share the same PKK ideology as the YBŞ and the YJÊ and have since left the Sinjar Alliance.

== Attacks on Sinjar ==
ISIS attacks on Sinjar City began on August 3, 2014. As Peshmerga troops fled Sinjar, YPG units moved in to fight IS forces. Despite YPG efforts, many Yazidis were forced to flee up Mount Sinjar, those who didn't make it were either enslaved or murdered. Since 2014 ISIS murdered 10,000 men and boys over the age of twelve, with about seventy mass graves discovered. Yazidi women and girls who encountered ISIS were enslaved and raped, with numbers totalling to over 7,000 victims. Yazidis trapped on Mount Sinjar in August 2014 were left without food or water in extreme heat. The U.S. provided some aid to the Yazidis, per Iraqi Government request. Airstrikes directed towards ISIS strongholds played a key role in holding off ISIS advances towards Mount Sinjar. The majority of Yazidis found safe passage through a corridor into Iraqi Kurdistan, provided by the YPG, PKK, HPS and the newly formed YBŞ.

=== Yazidi and ISIS Relations ===
The Yazidis are a group of indigenous people from Iraq, Syria and Turkey. They practice an ancient religion that worships a monotheistic God. The Yazidi people have been subjected to persecution for their entire existence. In the age of the Ottoman Empire, the Yazidis suffered 72 Genocidal Massacres. Prior to ISIS, Al-Qaeda identified the Yazidis as "Infidels". To this day the trend continues, Cale Salih wrote, "The rise of Islamic fundamentalism more broadly has pushed thousands of Yazidis to seek asylum in Europe". According to estimates, 70,000 people, or about 15% of the Yazidi population in Iraq, has fled the country since recent persecution. Germany has absorbed most of the refugees.

== PKK Involvement ==
While U.S. airstrikes and Peshmerga assistance receive most of the praise for the rescue of the Yazidis on Mount Sinjar in 2014, most Yazidi people agree that without the PKK they would not have found safe passage to Syrian Kurdistan.

=== Kurdish and PKK Relations ===
PKK philosophy like Democratic Confederalism and other ideology put forth by both the YBŞ and the YJÊ are at odds with the Kurdistan Regional Government, which pursues full control over the Sinjar region and publicly demands the withdrawal of PKK-linked groups. The looming presence of the Kurdish government is precisely why some Yazidi KDP politicians denounced the alliance at first, PKK involvement appeared to threaten Yazidi autonomy. The PKK however is completely separate from KRG policy, and practices "Grassroots Democracy", one PKK militant stated, "when the comrades liberate a village, they let the community to decide for itself". The KRG has publicly stated its distaste with the PKK regularly. After they left the Sinjar Alliance in 2017, leader of the Sinjar Defense Units (HPS), Haydar Shesho stated that PKK groups, like the Sinjar Alliance (YBŞ and YJÊ), have no business in the Sinjar region.

== 2017 ==
After over two years of fighting, the Sinjar Defense Units (HPS) left the Sinjar Alliance in 2017 to join the Peshmerga and serve under the Kurdish Government (KRG), who publicly denounced them just months before.

== Turkish Offensive ==
Since the United States removed troops from the Turkish and Syrian border on October 7, 2019, Yazidis fled their home villages in Syrian Kurdistan, fearing that history will repeat itself. One villager was quoted saying, "We left in the middle of the night for fear that they would kill us as happened with our people in Sinjar". The Turkish government publicly stated that it would clear its southern border of Kurds, primarily the YPG, YBŞ and other PKK backed groups, in what they claimed to be a resettlement plan for Syrian refugees living in Turkey. This put Yazidis at double the risk for persecution by the Turks and other groups, by living in a Kurdish occupied area, and not being Muslim. Yazidi officials signed a letter in September, 2019 saying: "the current events in northeastern Syria, if not halted, will annihilate Yazidis from their ancestral homeland in Syria". These threats maintain constant, even though the offensive is effectively over, in the time before Turkey halted its offensive, approximately 170,000 citizens were displaced, many of which were Yazidi. Turkey ultimately failed at capturing any majority Yazidi areas. It is estimated that over 200,000 Yazidi people remain homeless or in shelters as a result of persecution by IS.

== Quotes ==
YJÊ Soldier: "For ISIS it's a haram. If you're killed by a woman, you don't go to paradise".

Following the Turkish airstrikes on the Yazidi in August 2018, the Nobel Peace Prize recipient, Nadia Murad said: "Today Turkey carried several air strikes in different locations in Sinjar. Sinjar continues to be a war zone. How can Yazidis recover from this genocide or go back home".

== See also ==
- Genocide of Yazidis by ISIL
- November 2015 Sinjar offensive
