= Battle of Sharfadin Temple =

2014 battle in Iraq

Battle of Sherfedin
- Part of War in Iraq (2013–2017) Northern Iraq offensive (August 2014)
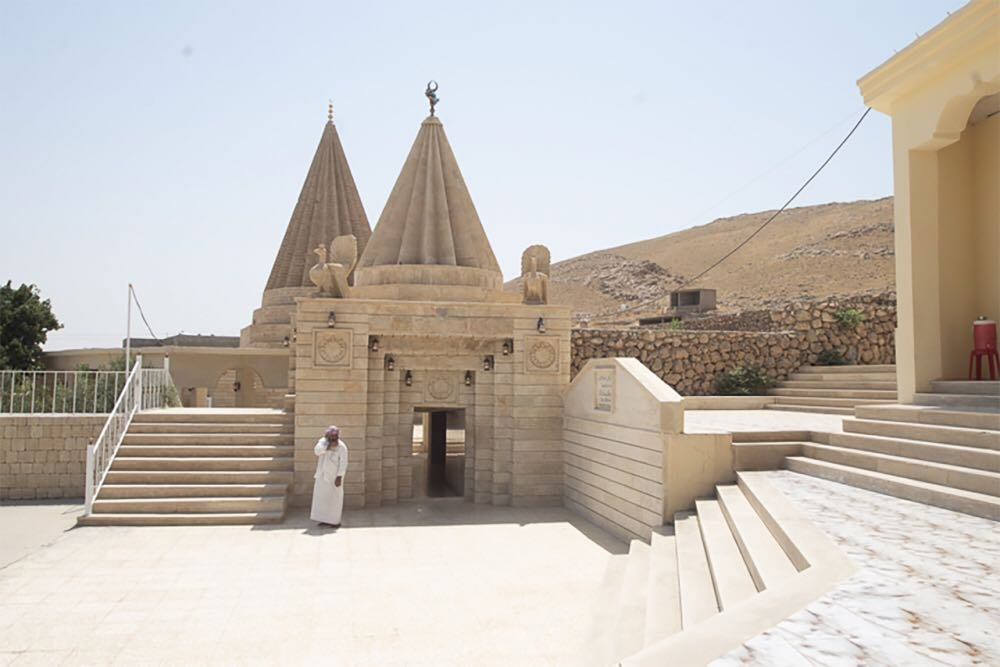
- Sharfadin Temple
Date	August – December 2014 (5 months)
Location	Sharfadin Temple, Sinjar District, Nineveh Governorate, Iraq
Result	Kurdish victory

Belligerents
Kurdistan Region	Islamic State

Commanders and leaders
(Kurdistan Region) Masoud Barzani (Kurdistan Region) Qasim Shesho; Haydar Shesho	Abu Bakr al-Baghdadi

Units involved
(Kurdistan Region) Peshmerga; HPŞ	Unknown

Strength
18 (initially) later reinforcements sent	650+

Casualties and losses
Low	268 killed 177 wounded 12 captured

The Battle of Sharafdin (or Sherfedîn ) was a 5-month-long battle from August, 2014 between the terrorist organization Islamic State (IS) and Kurdish Peshmerga forces with local Yazidis. The site of the battle is the pilgrimage site of Sharfadin, located on the Jabal Shingal mountain range in Ninewa Governorate in northwestern Iraq.

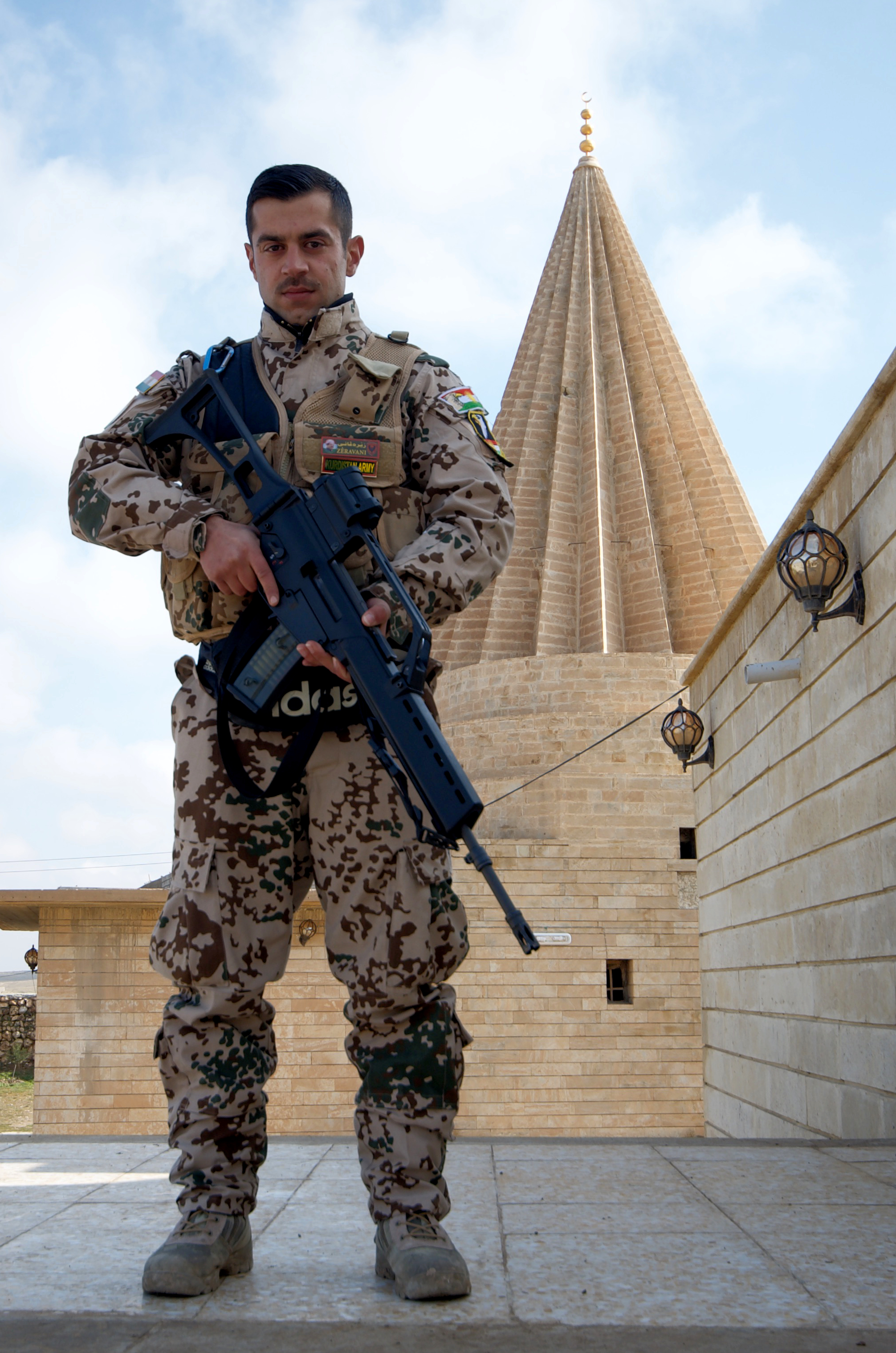
Yazidi Peshmerga soldier outside Sharfadin Temple

== Battle ==
In August 2014, the temple was the site of a battle where 18 lightly armed Yazidi Peshmerga fighters under the command of Qasim Shesho successfully held off a larger and better equipped IS force with armored vehicles, mortars, and rockets that had attacked the shrine as part of the genocide of Yazidis by IS.

On October 20, 2014, at three o'clock, the IS militias advanced on several locations around Jabal Shingal. Eyewitnesses report that 40 Humvees were used during the advance. The IS militias were able to advance quickly and encircle the defenders in the pilgrimage site of Sharfadin. For the Yazidi religious minority, Sharfadin is the second most important pilgrimage site. According to Yazidi statements, one hundred Yazidi fighters died as part of the major offensive on October 20 alone. The Yazidi vigilantes had been waiting for days for a promised relief attack from the Peshmerga. Both the escape and possible air support from the anti-IS alliance were hampered by days of rain. On October 22, the Yazidi defenders released a video showing the German-speaking fighter Yassir Qasim Khelef. The video is an appeal to the world for help and reports that the Yazidi vigilante group is only holding the position in the mountains and in the pilgrimage site, and that the IS militias are only 3 km away from the pilgrimage site.

On the morning of October 25, Kurdish forces again managed to capture the town of Zummar, about 50 km northeast of the Shingal Mountains. The defenders were able to keep the front line stable until the end of October, with support from the Peshmerga. On November 1, it was announced that the Peshmerga had launched an offensive to liberate the city of Shingal. The capital of the district is located about 10 km southwest of the pilgrimage site, on the opposite side of the Shingal Mountains.

In December 2014, the Peshmerga launched a major attack against IS in the region and were able to liberate most of the region within a few days.
