= December 2014 Sinjar offensive =

Sinjar offensive
- Part of the War in Iraq and the American-led intervention in Iraq
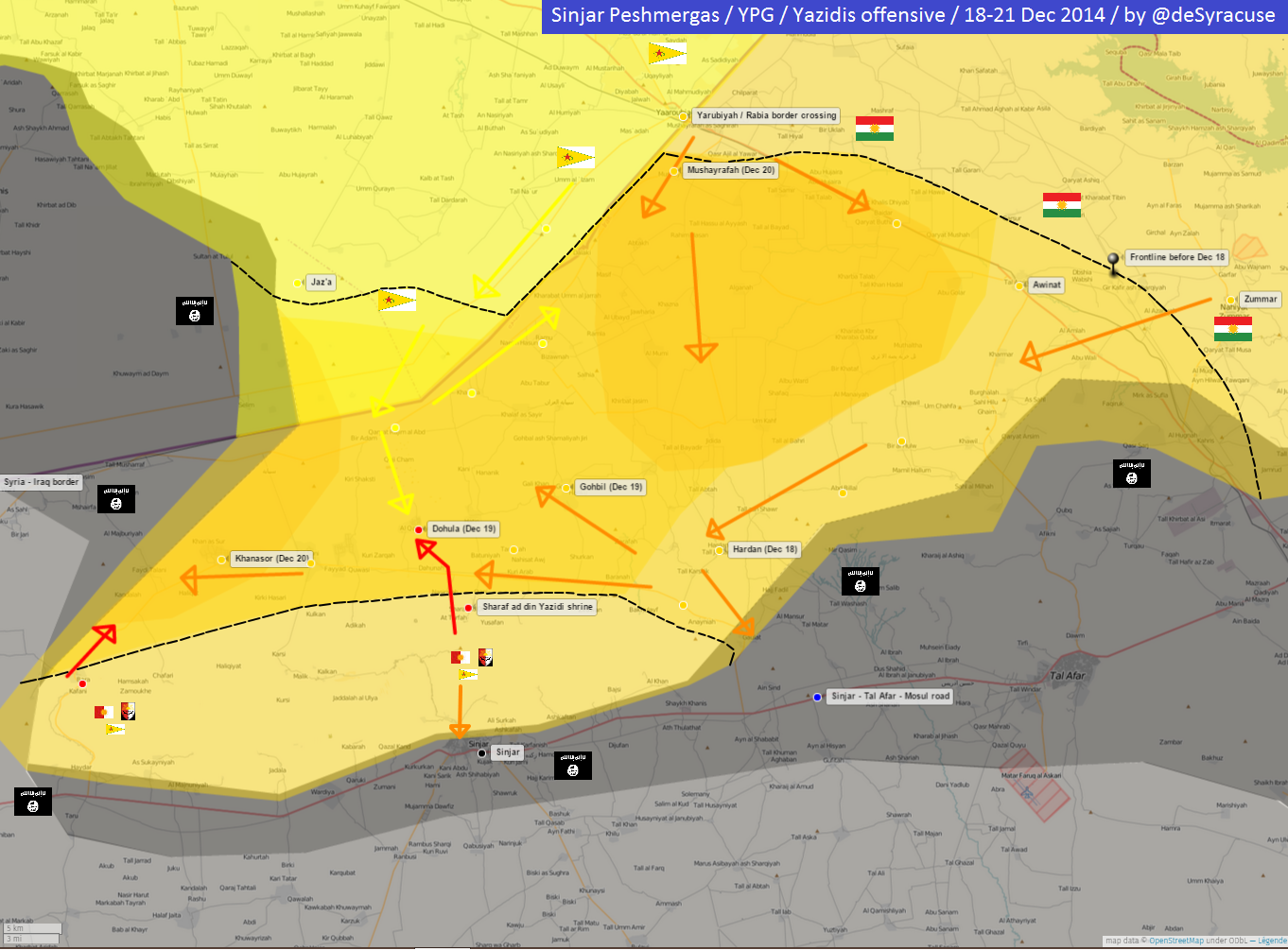
- Map of the Sinjar offensive
Date	17–22 December 2014 (6 days)
Location	Nineveh Governorate, Iraq
Result	Limited Kurdish gains: Kurdish forces secured the road from Zummar to Sinjar, but fail to take control of the whole of the Sinjar mountains; Kurdish forces capture a part of Sinjar city; A total of 1,295–3,000 square kilometers (500–1,158 square miles) of mostly desert and highway are recaptured by Kurdish forces; YPG and YBŞ cut the connection of ISIS of Raqqa and Mosul in Şengal.

Belligerents
Iraqi Kurdistan: Peshmerga; PKK: HPG; YJA-Star; Rojava: People's Protection Units; Syriac Military Council; Women's Protection Units; YBŞ; MLKP Air support: United States; United Kingdom; Canada; Australia; Other Support: Germany	Islamic State of Iraq and the Levant

Commanders and leaders
Masoud Barzani (Kurdistan Region) Qasim Shesho; Haydar Shesho Murat Karayilan; Sheikh Khairy Khedr †	(Islamic State) Abu Bakr al-Baghdadi (Leader) Abu Ibrahim al-Hashimi al-Qurashi (Replacement Military Chief)

Strength
8,000 Peshmerga soldiers 500–800 PKK Soldiers 3,400–4,500 YPG Soldiers	12,000 in Mosul province

Casualties and losses
Unknown	~400 killed (Peshmerga claim); 54 vehicles destroyed and 26 damaged

The Sinjar offensive was a combination of operations of Kurdish Peshmerga, PKK and People's Protection Units forces in December 2014, to recapture regions formerly lost to the Islamic State of Iraq and the Levant in their August offensive.

In a six-day-long offensive, the PKK and Peshmerga took control over part of the city of Sinjar and part of the mountains which had been conquered by ISIL in August 2014, and expanded their offensive on to Tal Afar.

== Background ==
In August 2014, the Islamic State of Iraq and the Levant launched an offensive in Northern Iraq and pushed into Kurdish held areas of the Nineveh Governorate, capturing the city of Sinjar, among others. Some 50,000 Yazidis fled to and remained in the Sinjar Mountains, located to the city's north.

By the end of August, the majority of those 50,000 Yazidis had left the mountains, although several thousands stayed there. ISIL held onto Sinjar city and the southern entrance of the Sinjar Mountains.

On 21 October 2014, ISIL seized terrain north of the mountains, thus cutting the area's escape route to Kurdish areas. The Yazidi militias then withdrew from there into the Sinjar Mountains, where the number of Yazidi civilian refugees was estimated at 2,000–7,000. An American source called this new situation a partial ISIL "siege" of the mountain range.

== Offensive ==
=== Peshmerga offensive ===
==== Sinjar area offensive ====
On 17 December 2014, at 7 AM (04.00 GMT), Peshmerga forces, directed personally by Masoud Barzani, the President of Iraqi Kurdistan, launched an offensive on the Sinjar area, backed by US-led coalition airstrikes that had started the night before. About 8,000 Peshmerga forces started advancing westward from Zummar, which had been recaptured by the Peshmerga in October 2014. A total of 45 airstrikes had been conducted by the US-led Coalition by end of the day. The Peshmerga were supported with training and equipment by a British Army training team.

==== Breaking the 'partial siege' of Mount Sinjar ====
On 18 December, the Peshmerga advanced even farther and managed to recapture a total of 700 square kilometers of territory and open a corridor from Zummar to Mount Sinjar, thus breaking the 'partial siege' of those mountains. According to a statement from the Kurdish command, large numbers of ISIL militants were fleeing, westward into Syria, and eastward into Mosul. A total of 53 airstrikes had been carried out as of Thursday evening 18 December. According to the U.S. Pentagon, the airstrikes near Sinjar had targeted ISIL storage units, bulldozers, guard towers, vehicles, and three bridges. Kurdish officials said on 19 December that, so far, more than 100 ISIL militants had been killed in this Kurdish Sinjar offensive.

==== Rabia offensive and closing in on Tal Afar ====
On 19 December, one day after the retaking of Mount Sinjar, the Peshmerga launched a new offensive from the Rabia border crossing southward to Mount Sinjar. The new offensive was launched at 8 AM (05.00 GMT), with the aim of further clearing the area north of Mount Sinjar. Simultaneously, Peshmerga forces on Mount Sinjar started pushing northward and captured Snuny, located on the road to Rabia.

As ISIL militants withdrew to Tal Afar and Mosul amid constant air attack, the Peshmerga expanded their offensive to Tal Afar — a large Turkmen city, located between Sinjar to Mosul and captured by ISIL in their June offensive — Kurdish officials said. On 19 December, Peshmerga were closing in on Tal Afar, firing artillery at ISIL positions nearby, residents reported.

==== Entering Sinjar, advance on Tal Afar stalled ====
Kurdish forces entered the city of Sinjar on the night of 20 December. The Kurdish advance on Tal Afar was stalled before 22 December, as Kurdish forces faced fierce resistance from ISIL militants inside the city of Sinjar.

On 21 December, 1,500 Iraqi Kurdish Peshmerga fighters, backed by local militia units, reportedly drove ISIL from the center of Sinjar. By this time, Kurdish forces had recaptured more than 500 square miles of mostly desert and highway. On the morning of 22 December, Peshmerga took control of much of Sinjar city.

A few days after Kurdish forces entered Sinjar, a high-ranking Peshmerga commander said in an interview that the push into the town was premature, as retaking Sinjar was not planned to be carried out in this offensive. According to him, some of the Peshmerga entered Sinjar without orders to do so, after seeing ISIL militants on the run.

=== YPG offensive ===
The Rojava's army, known as People's Protection Units (YPG), announced on 19 December that they were moving south towards the Iraqi border to reopen a corridor connecting Mount Sinjar to the Syrian border. The YPG had first opened that corridor in August 2014 to relieve tens of thousands of Yazidis stranded on Mount Sinjar. Two days later, the YPG said they had captured three villages on the Syrian side of the border and four villages on the Iraqi side, and that they had successfully reopened the corridor.

=== Aftermath ===
The Kurdish forces took control of a large area of the Sinjar mountains.

== Mass graves ==
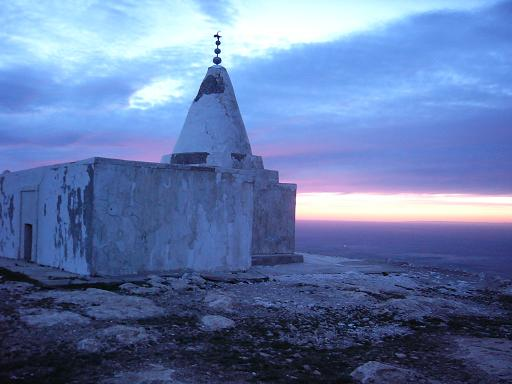
A Yazidi shrine; 18 such shrines had been destroyed by ISIL by the end of 2014

On the third day of the offensive, it was reported that a Yazidi mass grave containing 70 bodies had been found. According to Kurdish sources, nine Yazidi mass graves had been found by the end of the offensive. 18 Yazidi shrines have also been destroyed by ISIL militants since June 2014. Dozens of mass graves have been found.

== ISIL execution of deserters ==
According to local residents, ISIL executed more than 45 of its own members during the offensive, for failing to stand their ground against the Kurdish forces. The Syrian Observatory for Human Rights (SOHR) reported that ISIL had killed a total of 200 of its own fighters in December 2014, for fleeing the battlefield. In March 2015, ISIL again executed 18 of its own fighters in northern Iraq, amid accusations that the men texted the Kurdish enemy and planned on surrendering, SOHR reported.

== See also ==
- November 2015 Sinjar offensive
- Spillover of the Syrian Civil War
- American-led intervention in Iraq (2014–present)
- Fall of Mosul
- First Battle of Tikrit
- Siege of Kobanî
- List of Yazidi settlements
- Derna campaign (2014–16)
- Eastern al-Hasakah offensive
- Second Battle of Tikrit
- Battle of Sarrin (June–July 2015)
- List of wars and battles involving the Islamic State of Iraq and the Levant
