= Haydar Shesho =

Yezidi military commander and politician from Iraq

- Heyder Şeşo
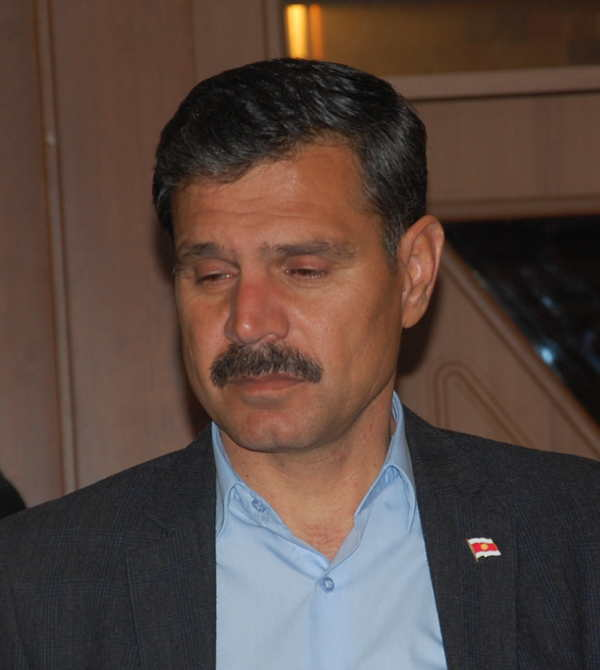
- Born: c. 1970; Sinjar District, Iraq
- Relatives: Qasim Shesho (uncle)
- Military career
- Allegiance: (Kurdistan Region) Ministry of Peshmerga (since 2017)
- Service years: 2014–present
- Rank: Supreme Commander
- Commands: Êzîdxan Protection Force
- Conflicts: Sinjar massacre (2014); Northern Iraq offensive (August 2014); Battle of Sharfadin Temple (2014–2015); December 2014 Sinjar offensive; November 2015 Sinjar offensive
- Other work: Founder and leader of Yezidi Democratic Party; Former member of Iraqi Parliament

Haydar Shesho (Kurmanji Kurdish: Heyder Şeşo; Arabic: حيدر ششو; also transliterated Haidar Shasho or Haider Shesho) (born c. 1970) is a Yezidi military commander and politician from Sinjar, Iraq. He commands the Êzîdxan Protection Force (HPÊ), a Yezidi armed force that began operating in 2014 under the name "Sinjar Protection Force" (HPS) after the Islamic State attack on Sinjar, and he leads the Yezidi Democratic Party.

Born in the Sinjar region, he emigrated to Germany, became a German citizen, and returned to Iraq in 2014 to organise armed resistance against IS with his uncle Qasim Shesho. He and Qasim are credited with the defence of the Sherfedin shrine, an episode that Yezidis narrate as the "Miracle of Sherfedin". He has campaigned for Yezidi control of Sinjar's security and administration, and has opposed the presence in the district of units aligned with the Kurdistan Workers' Party (PKK).

== Early life and family ==
Shesho was born around 1970 in the Sinjar region of northern Iraq. He is a member of the Shesho family, a prominent Yezidi family from the Sinjar region. The family traces its origins to the small village of Raşîd, which stood in the hills behind the Sherfedin shrine until it was abandoned; the village's local shrine was that of Hacalî. The family holds the traditional tribal status of agha (chieftain), and land around the present-day Sherfedin shrine is still considered to belong to the Sheshos; Qasim Shesho, as head of the family, has reportedly distributed land there to displaced Yezidis returning to the area.

Haydar Shesho emigrated to West Germany in the late 1980s and later became a German citizen. He kept a residence in Dohuk and travelled there from Germany at intervals. He later married into a local family in the Yezidi village of Khanke in the Kurdistan Region, and the in-laws' house there is known locally as his house.

His uncle Qasim Shesho, who also lived in Germany, had taken part in the Kurdish armed opposition to Saddam Hussein's government in the 1970s and was affiliated with the rival Kurdistan Democratic Party (KDP).

In 1993 Haydar Shesho joined the PUK, one of the two main parties of the Kurdistan Region, and he later sat on its central body. He sat in the Iraqi parliament in 2005 and survived an assassination attempt during that period in which three other people were killed.

== 2014 Sinjar massacre and defence of the Sherfedin shrine ==
=== Background ===
In the weeks preceding the assault, Shesho, together with his uncle Qasim Shesho and other Yezidi representatives, formally requested that Serbest Babiri, chairman of the KDP's Shingal branch, allow the establishment of a Yezidi volunteer force to defend the district. They had repeatedly asked KDP officials for permission and weapons to form an independent Yezidi defence force, warning that up to 3,500 Yezidi men stood ready; the request was refused, with local KDP officials reportedly citing the presence of roughly 11,000 Peshmerga already stationed in the district. Peshmerga commander Aziz Waysi later said Kurdish security forces had also confiscated weapons from would-be Yezidi volunteers, citing a need to prevent the emergence of "disorganized forces" outside the regional command structure, a rationale that has been disputed by Yezidi leaders, who have suggested the real concern was that an armed and independent Yezidi force would be difficult for the KDP to control. The Sheshos proceeded to organise fighters regardless.

=== The IS attack ===
On 3 August 2014, IS fighters attacked Sinjar, and the roughly 10,000-strong Peshmerga garrison stationed in the district withdrew, leaving the Yezidi population largely undefended. The Peshmerga leadership fled before civilians did, according to Qasim Shesho's own account, and a Kurdish official confirmed to The Washington Post that the withdrawal had been organised.

IS fighters overran Sinjar, triggering what the United Nations and other bodies have characterised as a genocide against the Yezidi religious minority. Thousands of Yezidis were killed, and thousands of women and children were abducted and enslaved, while Kurdish Peshmerga forces stationed in the district withdrew in the face of the IS advance. Around 200,000 Yezidis fled into the Sinjar mountain range, where many were besieged for months. Researcher Benjamin Raßbach, who conducted fieldwork in Sinjar between 2019 and 2021, writes that the Peshmerga's withdrawal at the start of the IS assault "effectively made the genocide possible."

=== Return to Sinjar ===
On the morning after the Peshmerga garrison withdrew, Haydar Shesho left Semel near Dohuk, reaching Sinjar around five hours later and entering from the north before IS forces had cut off that approach. Qasim Shesho and several cousins who returned from Germany joined the fighting. Qasim Shesho, then based at his home near the Sherfedin shrine, refused to leave. On 4 August, the first IS vehicle reached the shrine; its occupants, not expecting armed resistance, had already kidnapped 67 people fleeing nearby villages. Shesho's men killed one of the fighters, prompting the rest to flee and abandon their captives.

=== Siege of the Sherfedin shrine ===
When IS forces advanced on the village of Sinoun and its adjoining shrine of Sherfedin, an approximately 800-year-old Yezidi pilgrimage site built in 1274 and dedicated to the saint Sherfedin, Shesho refused to withdraw, vowing to fight to the death to protect the shrine and stating "ISIS would have to walk on our dead body if they wanted to desecrate [Sherfedin]". He led a band of eighteen lightly armed Yezidi Peshmerga fighters in defending the shrine, telling journalists "we were just 18 Peshmerga against ISIS. Supplies were extremely limited in the early stages of the siege; our men shared a single round of flatbread each day, and fighters conserved ammunition, wanting each bullet fired to be fatal".

The following days were the most difficult of the siege, as thousands of civilians, including many of the families later photographed stranded on the Sinjar Mountain, took refuge in the hills directly behind the shrine. As the siege continued, the number of armed groups defending the shrine and surrounding area grew from an initial seven to 37 by the end of 2014, and to 72 by 2017, as more Yezidis from across the district joined the defence.

When the main assault began, Islamic State fighters attempted to negotiate a surrender. Haydar Shesho refused and fired first. IS fighters then telephoned Qasim Shesho directly and demanded he surrender the shrine. He refused, reportedly telling them to come and get him. Over the following months, IS reportedly attempted as many as sixteen separate assaults on the shrine, none successful.

=== The "Miracle of Sherfedin" ===
The most significant single episode of the siege, later remembered by many Yezidis as the "Miracle of Sherfedin", came when an IS-operated armoured vehicle laden with explosives approached the shrine and was destroyed in a massive explosion, leaving a deep hole in the road opposite Haydar Shesho's house, which was almost demolished; fragments of the vehicle were thrown more than a kilometre, and despite two men being fifteen metres away and roughly a hundred fighters being nearby, only one person sustained a minor injury, leading many to believe it was the shrine's patron, Sherfedin, who had intervened on their behalf. Accounts of what destroyed the vehicle vary: some defenders believed it self-detonated or malfunctioned, others attributed it to a coalition airstrike (the US Air Force had begun targeting IS vehicles in the Sinjar area from 9 August 2014), and many understood it as divine intervention by the shrine's patron. The shrine's dome sustained a bullet hole from IS gunfire during the fighting, still visible years later.

=== October 2014 offensive ===
On 20 October 2014, IS launched a major offensive using armoured Humvees that briefly encircled Shesho's men at the shrine, in what is now referred to as the Battle of Sherfedin; Yezidi accounts put the death toll at roughly 100 fighters. Despite repeated appeals, Peshmerga reinforcements did not arrive; Haydar Shesho later said the defenders waited seventy-three days for help. During one nighttime bombardment, Qasim Shesho reportedly stepped out of cover holding a glass of whiskey and told his men to relax, since the incoming fire could not reach them.

=== End of the siege and aftermath ===
The siege lasted roughly five months, during which the shrine and surrounding area were cut off and, for a period, effectively surrounded by IS-held territory. Heavily outgunned by IS, the defenders held the shrine through four months of repeated attacks, a feat many Yezidis have since regarded as effectively miraculous. Shesho's forces grew from the initial 18 men to a force of roughly 2,000 fighters as Yezidis from across the Sinjar area joined the defence, and the shrine was ultimately preserved from destruction. Several Islamic State fighters were captured, which Qasim Shesho later had executed.

Peshmerga reinforcements reached the shrine on 19 December 2014; by that point, Islamic State fighters withdrew from the area without further combat. Northern Sinjar and Sinjar city were finally retaken by Kurdish forces with the help of US-led airstrikes in late December. Villages south of the mountain, however, were not retaken by the PKK or Peshmerga at all, they were eventually recaptured by the newly formed Hashd al-Shaabi (Popular Mobilization Forces), an Iraqi government-backed militia conglomerate that by then included Yezidi brigades of its own. After the recapture, the district was left de facto divided between three separate armed factions, the PKK/YBŞ, the KDP-Peshmerga, and the Hashd al-Shaabi, each partly Yezidi in composition. A captured IS armoured vehicle remains on display outside the Sherfedin shrine as a monument to its defence.

== Êzîdxan Protection Force ==
=== Formation and strength ===
Over the following months Shesho built up a militia, the Sinjar Protection Force, known by its Kurmanji initials HPS (Hêza Parastina Şingal). It drew funds from wealthy Yezidis in the diaspora and attracted a few dozen foreign volunteers. In June 2015 its members put its strength at about 5,000 fighters, including about 400 women. A 2016 estimate counted about 1,300 fighters available for combat and a reserve pool of about 4,000. The force was later renamed the Êzîdxan Protection Force (HPÊ) in order to represent the whole of Êzîdxan, the Yezidi homeland, rather than Sinjar alone. Its flag is red and white with a large yellow sun, which has come to be seen widely as the Yezidi flag.

=== Relations with other forces ===
Three Yezidi forces were fighting IS in the area in 2015. The HPS was independent. Qasim Shesho commanded a force under the Peshmerga around the Sherfedin shrine. The PKK-aligned Sinjar Resistance Units (YBŞ) were the third. The political split between the KDP-aligned uncle and the PUK-aligned nephew led Haydar to run the HPS separately from his family. The two men nonetheless remained as close allies. Under Haydar the HPS drew financial and military support from Baghdad. HPS fighters who refused to serve under the Peshmerga Ministry received no salary from the KRG.

Relations with the PKK and its affiliates were disputed. People close to Shesho say that in 2014 the PKK demanded to raise its flag at the shrine and that Shesho refused, and some say a PKK-aligned fighter killed one of his men. Others told Raßbach that PKK-aligned fighters stayed at or near the shrine for between one and three months and helped defend it, and the Yezidi news site ÊzîdîPress reported close coordination between the PKK and local Yezidis who had joined the Shesho family from August to October 2014. A friend of Shesho's said that when a Yezidi Hashd unit wanted to take over one of his checkpoints, Shesho handed it over because he did not want fellow Yezidis to be killed.

=== Public profile ===
Shesho presented the force as a Yezidi one and said Yezidis should govern themselves. Since the genocide his call for a Yezidi party and an autonomous Yezidi force has become more popular among Yezidis. At a camp for displaced Yezidis in Arbat in 2015, residents met him with Yezidi flags and chants that all Yezidis were Haydar Shesho. In 2015 he travelled to Armenia, where he met Yezidi youth and community representatives. The group agreed that an organisation uniting Yezidis worldwide should be created.

== Arrest in 2015 ==
KRG security forces arrested Shesho on 5 April 2015. The HPS said he was taken from his home in Khanke, Dohuk Governorate. The KRG accused him of maintaining an illegal armed force. The German government stated that he had let a deadline pass for integrating the militia into the Kurdistan Region's legal forces. He was also questioned about funding from Iran-backed Shia units of the Popular Mobilization Forces.

He was released on 13 April 2015 after a decision by a court in Dohuk. The German consulate general in Erbil gave him consular assistance during his detention. Yezidis in Germany held solidarity demonstrations in Hannover and Brussels. The PUK pressed the KRG for his release because it considered the arrest politically motivated, a reaction to Shesho's criticism of Masoud Barzani.

After the release Barzani said he would not tolerate Yezidi units outside the Peshmerga Ministry and that the HPS would have to give up its flag. Shesho replied that the HPS would accept help from the ministry and other Kurdish authorities, and that its fighters were free either to join the ministry or to stay independent.

== Political and military activity since 2017 ==
=== Integration into the Peshmerga ===
In February 2017 Shesho said his force, by then called the Êzîdxan Protection Force (HPÊ), was waiting for Barzani's formal decision on joining the Ministry of Peshmerga. He said it would keep its name and its Yezidi flag whatever conditions were attached. He said Yezidis consider themselves Kurdistani and speak Kurdish. On 9 March 2017 he said Barzani had approved the request and that the force took orders from the ministry and the Kurdistan Region president. He added that it would stay out of fighting between Kurdish factions.

About 1,000 fighters were registered under the ministry in mid-March 2017. The registration drew criticism from some who were left off the list. After the registration his troops received salaries from the ministry. Earlier that month, when fighting broke out in Sinjar between the Roj Brigade and the YBŞ, Shesho said the HPÊ would take no side and acted as a mediator.

=== Founding of the Yezidi Democratic Party ===
On 17 April 2017 the PUK confirmed that Shesho had resigned from its Central Council to found a new party. He said he had begun registering the Yezidi Democratic Party (Partiya Êzidîya Demokrat) and that his force, fully incorporated into the Peshmerga Ministry, depended on it for salaries and weapons and would not belong to any party. The party is based in Dohuk and states that its aim is to protect Yezidi rights. Shesho has used it to argue that Sinjar should be part of the Kurdistan Region with self-administration, a position that is contested among Yezidis and opposed by Baghdad. Shesho has remained ambiguous towards the Kurdish parties, publicly stressing his independence from them.

=== Sinjar after October 2017 ===
Iraqi forces and Popular Mobilization Forces units entered Sinjar on 17 October 2017, after Iraqi forces took Kirkuk and the Peshmerga withdrew from disputed areas. Shesho and his force stayed in their positions. He said the Iraqi side had promised not to interfere in the town's administration but that Popular Mobilization units then looted homes. He said he had no agreement with Baghdad and trusted the army but not the Popular Mobilization Forces.

Shesho's force did not follow an order from the Peshmerga Ministry to leave Sinjar, and the ministry therefore cut its salaries and other privileges. Shesho said the force would stay because leaving would leave residents desperate. He also warned of growing PKK-affiliated activity in the district.

In March 2021 Shesho called for PKK and Popular Mobilization Forces units to be removed from the district, by force if necessary. He said the interests of the two were aligned in seeking to control strategic parts of Sinjar. In December 2024 he told Shafaq News that the Iraqi army and Popular Mobilization Forces had reinforced the Syrian border near Sinjar, and he urged Baghdad to give the border forces the resources they needed. In April 2025 he asked the PKK to follow Abdullah Öcalan's call and said its disputes with Turkey should be settled without arms.

Ahead of the 2025 Iraqi parliamentary election, speaking as head of the Yezidi Democratic Party and commander of the HPÊ, Shesho urged Yezidis to vote for candidates who represent them. He said it was unjust that only one of Iraq's nine minority quota seats was reserved for Yezidis. He said the return of displaced Yezidis had become a political issue, and that more than 25,000 Yezidi families still lived in displacement in camps and elsewhere in the Dohuk area. On the twelfth anniversary of the genocide, on 3 August 2026, he said that both Baghdad and the KRG had failed to carry out their commitments on the return of displaced Yezidis to Sinjar. He denied the claims that the Popular Mobilization Forces were not blocking returns, and that the district's future was not being decided by its residents.

In October 2026 Shesho welcomed the planned integration of YBŞ members into Iraqi security forces, on the condition of strict vetting. He said not all armed men in Sinjar are natives of the district and that some came from Syrian or Turkish Kurdistan and were issued Iraqi identity documents under local names. He said his force had submitted lists of more than 5,000 names to Baghdad, about 4,000 fighters and more than 1,000 civilian staff, to be distributed between the Popular Mobilization Forces, the army and the local police. He also said the federal government had paid only 10 to 18 percent of the compensation owed.

=== Political positions ===
Shesho has repeatedly called for Yezidi control of Sinjar, moving between Baghdad, the PUK and the KDP in pursuit of that goal. Analyst Nicholas Heras of the Jamestown Foundation wrote in 2017 that his support for including Sinjar in the Kurdistan Region went together with a push for a formal Yezidi military role in it, and described him as one of the most important political and military leaders in the region. Heras also noted that Shesho had become an outspoken opponent of the YBŞ, which is linked to the PKK and was the target of Turkish airstrikes. The HPÊ and YBŞ were described as having an uneasy relationship in Sinjar and as having periodically clashed. In December 2017 Shesho said the PKK's plan did not serve Sinjar or its people, and asked its remaining fighters to hand themselves over to the Iraqi government.

== Reception ==
Van den Toorn described him in 2015 as a hero to many Yezidis who regarded him as one of their own. KDP officials, including Hemin Hawrami, regarded him as an illegal troublemaker and said militias like his divided the coalition against IS and challenged Kurdish governing structures. Heras called him one of the most powerful Yezidi political and military leaders in the Kurdistan Region.

== See also ==
- List of Yezidi people
- Yezidis in Iraq
- Khal Ali
- Sheikh Khairy Khedr
- Khatoon Khider

== Works cited ==
- Raßbach, Benjamin (2024). Landscapes of Resistance: Narratives around Sacred Places in Sinjar (Iraq) and the Islamic State's Genocide against Yezidis. Iran and the Caucasus Monographs. Vol. 4. Leiden: Brill. doi:10.1163/9789004711655. ISBN 978-90-04-71164-8.
