= Western Sahara Resource Watch =

Organization aiming to protect the natural resources in Western Sahara

Western Sahara Resource Watch (WSRW) is a network organization working on the natural resource situation in Western Sahara.

WSRW consists of organizations and campaigners from more than 40 countries researching and campaigning against the companies working in partnership with the Moroccan government in occupied Western Sahara. The organization was established in 2004, and works in solidarity with the Polisario. The organization believes that the occupation of Western Sahara will continue as long as Morocco profits from it.

A part of Western Sahara is controlled by Morocco. The United Nations (UN) Legal Counsel, Ambassador Hans Corell expressed in 2002 that the natural resources management in Western Sahara only would be in line with international law if it took into account the "wishes and interests of the people of Western Sahara".

WSRW works to inform international companies about the UN Legal Opinion and of the ethical aspects of business practice in the territory. The organization also launches campaigns, encouraging multinational companies and governments not to invest and participate in trade in the occupied territories of Western Sahara until a peaceful solution to the conflict has been found.

== Previous campaigns ==
WSRW has previously carried out campaigns against the phosphate, oil and fish industries. Since 2006, the organization has worked to prevent the European Union entering agreements with Morocco covering the territory of Western Sahara, most importantly its Fisheries Partnership Agreements. In 2011 the EU parliament terminated the last Fisheries Partnership Agreements with Morocco for the waters of Western Sahara.
