= Qasim Shesho =

Yazidi military commander

- قاسم ششو (Arabic); Qasim Şeşo (Kurdish)
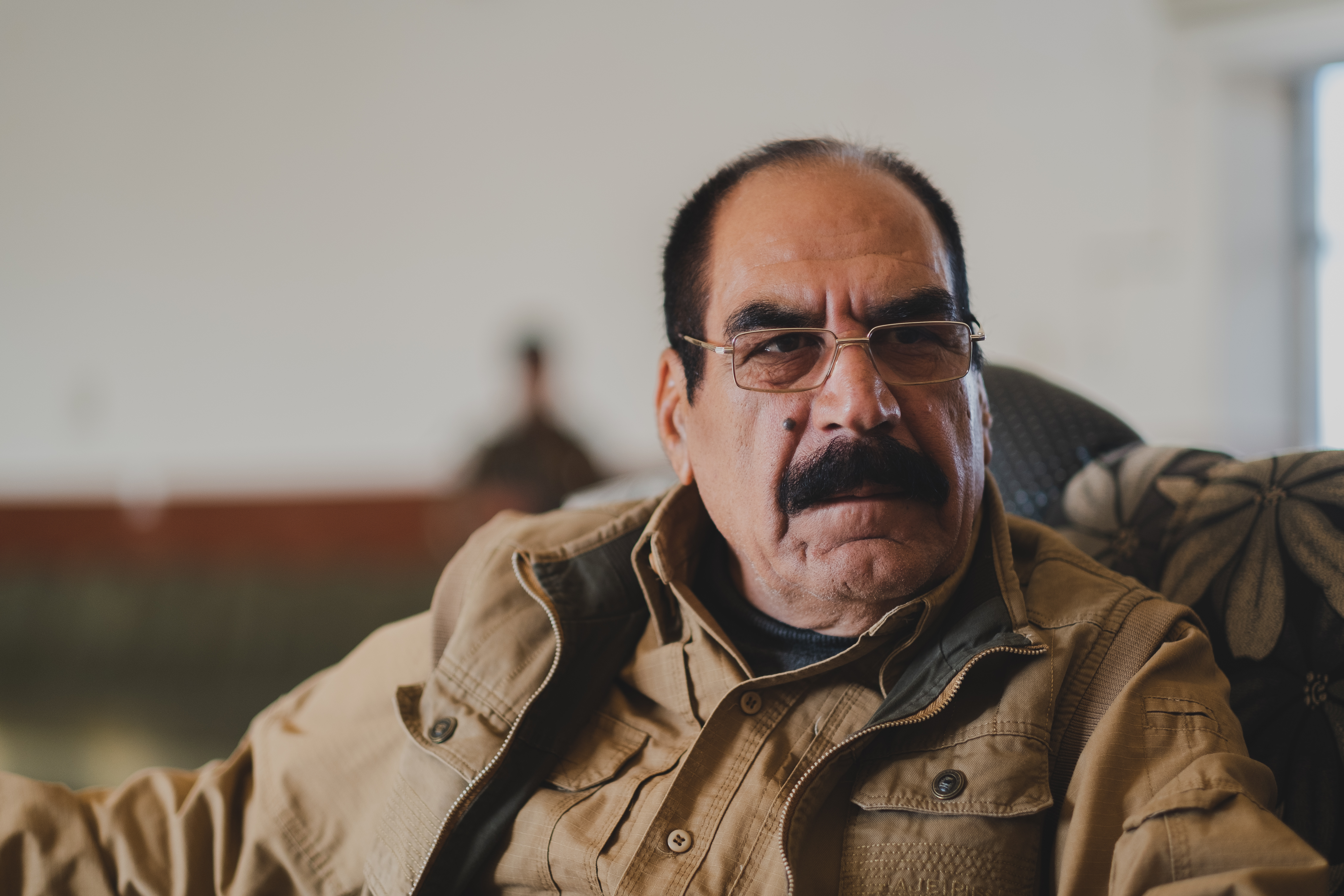
- Born: 1953 (age 72–73); Rashid, Sinjar District, Nineveh Governorate, Kingdom of Iraq
- Relatives: Haydar Shesho (nephew)
- Military career
- Allegiance: Kurdistan Region (Kurdistan Democratic Party)
- Branch: Peshmerga
- Service years: 1980s–present
- Rank: Commander (Sinjar Command / "Qasim Shesho Force")
- Nickname: "Old Tiger of Sinjar" or "Lion of Sinjar"
- Conflicts: Iraqi-Kurdish conflict; Sinjar massacre (2014); Northern Iraq offensive (August 2014); Battle of Sharfadin Temple (2014–2015); December 2014 Sinjar offensive

Qasim Shesho (Kurdish: Qasim Şeşo; born 1953) is a Yazidi military commander in Sinjar (Şingal), northern Iraq. He commands a Yazidi Peshmerga force affiliated with the Kurdistan Democratic Party (KDP) and is widely known by the honorific "the Lion of Sinjar" or "Old Tiger of Mount Sinjar" for organizing local resistance against the Islamic State (IS) at the Sharfadin temple in August 2014, during the Yazidi genocide. He is the uncle of fellow Yazidi commander Haydar Shesho.

== Personal life ==
Qasim Shesho was born 1953 in the village of Rashid near Sharfadin temple in the Sinjar district of Nineveh Governorate, Iraq.

Shesho is a member of the Shesho family, a prominent Yazidi family from the Sinjar region. The Shesho family traces its origins to the small village of Raşîd, which stood in the hills behind the Şerfedîn shrine until it was abandoned; the village's local shrine was that of Hacalî. The family holds the traditional tribal status of agha (chieftain), and land around the present-day Şerfedîn shrine is still considered to belong to the Sheshos; Qasim, as head of the family, has reportedly distributed land there to displaced Yazidis returning to the area.

Shesho has been a member of the Kurdistan Democratic Party and an honored Peshmerga commander since the 1970s. After the collapse of the Kurdish uprising against the Ba'athist government in 1975, he led the Yazidi-Kurdish resistance in Sinjar from a hideout across the border in Syria.

Numerous stories about Shesho's exploits during this period circulate in Sinjar. According to an account from his son Haval, Shesho once stormed a Ba'athist military outpost near the Çil Mêra shrine and telephoned the Iraqi army post at Tel Afar to declare that he had killed everyone there and was coming for them next, prompting the local commander to abandon his post; Shesho is said to have gone on to destroy all four Iraqi army outposts then stationed around the Şerfedîn shrine.

He was imprisoned by Iraqi authorities in Mosul between 1974 and 1979, until a general amnesty secured his release. Throughout the 1980s he crossed on foot between Syria and the Sinjar Mountain, reportedly with the support of the Syrian government under Hafez al-Assad. In 1981, he fled Sinjar together with his wife and children to escape Saddam Hussein's forces, initially settling in Syria. The Syrian government granted the Shesho family asylum in 1982.

Historian Thomas Schmidinger relates that when an Iraqi intelligence officer travelled to Syria to negotiate Shesho's return to Iraq, Shesho shot him.

In 1989 the family emigrated again, this time to West Germany, eventually settling in Bad Oeynhausen, where the family obtained German citizenship. Shesho worked as a gardener/landscaper. He vowed to return to Sinjar only after Saddam Hussein's fall.

He returned to Iraq after the fall of the Ba'athist government in 2003 and continued his involvement with Peshmerga forces in the Sinjar area. He came back in 2004 in a triumphal procession of one hundred men.

Shesho has several sons, some of whom joined him in Iraq to fight alongside his forces, traveling from Germany to help defend the Sharfadin shrine in 2014, and one of his sons was quoted anonymously by Radio Free Europe/Radio Liberty in 2015 discussing the Kurdistan Regional Government's reluctance to arm Yazidi fighters. Shesho's own sons came from Germany to help their father defend the holy site. One of Qasim's sons said that the reason the KRG had not supplied the Yazidis with weapons was because they feared the Yazidis were too strong and would build an independent army. Several of his sons also lived in the Ostwestfalen-Lippe region of Germany, and two of them served for a time as soldiers in the German Bundeswehr.

His nephew Haydar Shesho is likewise a well-known Yazidi militia commander. At the onset of the August 2014 Sinjar massacre, together with his uncle Qasim Shesho and several cousins, Haydar Shesho returned to Iraq to help protect his Yazidi homeland.

== 2014 Sinjar massacre and defense of Sharfadin temple ==
On 3 August 2014, IS fighters attacked Sinjar, and the roughly 10,000-strong Peshmerga garrison stationed in the district withdrew, leaving the Yazidi population largely undefended. The Peshmerga leadership fled before civilians did, according to Qasim Shesho's own account, and a Kurdish official confirmed to the Washington Post that the withdrawal had been organized. In the weeks preceding the assault, Shesho, together with his nephew Haider Shesho and other Yazidi representatives, formally requested that Serbest Bapir, chairman of the KDP's Shingal branch, allow the establishment of a Yazidi volunteer force to defend the district. They had repeatedly asked KDP officials for permission and weapons to form an independent Yazidi defense force, warning that up to 3,500 Yazidi men stood ready; the request was refused, with local KDP officials reportedly citing the presence of roughly 11,000 Peshmerga already stationed in the district. Peshmerga commander Aziz Waysi later said Kurdish security forces had also confiscated weapons from would-be Yazidi volunteers, citing a need to prevent the emergence of "disorganized forces" outside the regional command structure, a rationale that has been disputed by Yazidi leaders, who have suggested the real concern was that an armed and independent Yazidi force would be difficult for the KDP to control. The Sheshos proceeded to organize fighters regardless.

IS fighters overran Sinjar, triggering what the United Nations and other bodies have characterized as a genocide against the Yazidi religious minority. Thousands of Yazidis were killed, and thousands of women and children were abducted and enslaved, while Kurdish Peshmerga forces stationed in the district withdrew in the face of the IS advance. Around 200,000 Yazidis fled into the Sinjar mountain range, where many were besieged for months. Researcher Benjamin Raßbach, who conducted fieldwork in Sinjar between 2019 and 2021, writes that the Peshmerga's withdrawal at the start of the IS assault "effectively made the genocide possible."

On that morning after the Peshmerga garrison withdrew, Haydar Shesho left Semel near Dohuk that morning, reaching Sinjar around five hours later and entering from the north before IS forces had cut off that approach. Qasim Shesho, then based at his home near the Şerfedîn shrine, refused to leave. On 4 August, the first IS vehicle reached the shrine; its occupants, not expecting armed resistance, had already kidnapped 67 people fleeing nearby villages. Shesho's men killed one of the fighters, prompting the rest to flee and abandon their captives.

When IS forces advanced on the village of Sinoun and its adjoining shrine of Sharfadin, an approximately 800-year-old Yazidi pilgrimage site built in 1274 and dedicated to the saint Sharfadin, Shesho refused to withdraw, vowing to fight to the death to protect the shrine and stating "ISIS would have to walk on our dead body if they wanted to desecrate Sharfadin". He led a band of just eighteen lightly armed Yazidi Peshmerga fighters in defending the shrine, telling journalists "we were just 18 Peshmerga against ISIS." Supplies were extremely limited in the early stages of the siege; our men shared a single round of flatbread each day, and fighters conserved ammunition, wanting each bullet fired to be fatal.

The following days were the most difficult of the siege, as thousands of civilians, including many of the families later photographed stranded on the Sinjar Mountain, took refuge in the hills directly behind the shrine. As the siege continued, the number of armed groups defending the shrine and surrounding area grew from an initial seven to thirty-seven by the end of 2014, and to seventy-two by 2017, as Yazidis from across the district joined the defense.

When the main assault began, Islamic State fighters attempted to negotiate a surrender. Haydar Shesho refused and fired first. IS fighters then telephoned Qasim Shesho directly and demanded he surrender the shrine; he refused, reportedly telling them to come and get him. Over the following months, IS reportedly attempted as many as sixteen separate assaults on the shrine, none successful.

The most significant single episode of the siege, later remembered by many Yazidis as the "Miracle of Şerfedîn", came when an IS-operated armored vehicle laden with explosives approached the shrine and was destroyed in a massive explosion, leaving a deep hole in the road opposite Haydar Shesho's house, which was almost demolished; fragments of the vehicle were thrown more than a kilometer, and despite two men being fifteen metres away and roughly a hundred fighters being nearby, only one person sustained a minor injury, leading many to believe it was the shrine's patron, Şerfedîn, who had intervened on their behalf. Accounts of what destroyed the vehicle vary: some defenders believed it self-detonated or malfunctioned, others attributed it to a coalition airstrike (the US Air Force had begun targeting IS vehicles in the Sinjar area from 9 August 2014), and many understood it as divine intervention by the shrine's patron. The shrine's dome sustained a bullet hole from IS gunfire during the fighting, still visible years later.

On 20 October 2014, IS launched a major offensive using armored Humvees that briefly encircled Shesho's men at the shrine, in what is now referred to as the Battle of Sharfadin; Yazidi accounts put the death toll at roughly 100 fighters. Despite repeated appeals, Peshmerga reinforcements did not arrive; Haydar Shesho later said the defenders waited seventy-three days for help. During one nighttime bombardment, Qasim Shesho reportedly stepped out of cover holding a glass of whiskey and told his men to relax, since the incoming fire could not reach them.

The siege lasted roughly five months, during which the shrine and surrounding area were cut off and, for a period, effectively surrounded by IS-held territory. Heavily outgunned by IS, the defenders held the shrine through four months of repeated attacks, a feat many Yazidis have since regarded as effectively miraculous. Shesho's forces grew from the initial 18 men to a force of roughly 2,000 fighters as Yazidis from across the Sinjar area joined the defense, and the shrine was ultimately preserved from destruction. Several Islamic State fighters were captured, which Qasim Shesho later had executed.

Peshmerga reinforcements reached the shrine on 19 December 2014; by that point, Islamic State fighters withdrew from the area without further combat. Northern Sinjar and Sinjar city were finally retaken by Kurdish forces with the help of US-led airstrikes in late December. Villages south of the mountain, however, were not retaken by the PKK or Peshmerga at all, they were eventually recaptured by the newly formed Hashd al-Shaabi (Popular Mobilization Forces), an Iraqi government-backed militia conglomerate that by then included Yazidi brigades of its own. After the recapture, the district was left de facto divided between three separate armed factions, the PKK/YBŞ, the KDP-Peshmerga, and the Hashd al-Shaabi, each partly Yazidi in composition. A captured IS armored vehicle remains on display outside the Sharfadin shrine as a monument to its defense.

Following the initial retreat of Peshmerga forces from Sinjar, Kurdistan Region President Masoud Barzani ordered the arrest of the senior commander who had given the withdrawal order and promoted Shesho in his place, elevating him to a senior command position over Yazidi forces in the area.

== Later command and post-ISIS politics ==
Since 2014, Shesho has lived and commanded from the qāʿa, a communal religious hall traditionally used for feasts and holidays beside the Şerfedîn shrine, which he converted into his military headquarters; a captured IS vehicle is displayed outside as a monument to the shrine's defense. He receives visitors daily in the hall's garden, and most Tuesday and Wednesday evenings takes part in the hilkirna çira ceremony, a candle-lighting rite conducted at the shrine by Sheikh Ismail Bahri, with armed Peshmerga securing the surrounding hills.

Shesho's continued presence at Şerfedîn constitutes the Kurdistan Democratic Party's last remaining foothold in Sinjar, following the Iraqi government's takeover of most of the district after the 2017 Kurdish independence referendum. His relocation to the qāʿa has been a point of contention with the Bahri family, the shrine's traditional religious custodians, who regard the move, from a non-political communal building to Shesho's private and military headquarters, as improper, given that he had lived in Sinjar City before the genocide.

Some Yazidis affiliated with PKK-linked factions have alleged that a nearby shrine to the Yazidi figure Şêx Mend was newly built under Shesho's direction for his own financial benefit; Shesho and his supporters dispute this, maintaining the site held sacred significance predating any recent construction.

In late August and early September 2014, both the PKK-affiliated People's Protection Units (YPG) and Kurdistan Region Peshmerga sought to raise their respective flags at the Şerfedîn shrine. Shesho refused both, declaring that no party flag, including a Yazidi one, would ever be raised at the pilgrimage site, and that Yazidi unity took priority over factional recognition. The Yazidi outlet Êzîdîpress reported the dispute at the time, and the episode has since been cited by KDP-aligned Yazidis as evidence that Shesho positioned himself above party politics, even though he had at most briefly suspended his own KDP membership after the genocide began.

Shesho has repeatedly criticized the Kurdistan Regional Government for failing to adequately arm Yazidi forces under his command, arguing this stemmed from Erbil's fear of an independently strong Yazidi military. Speaking to the German outlet taz in 2015, he said his men received only enough weapons to defend themselves, not to mount offensives against IS, while one of his sons suggested the Kurdistan Regional Government withheld arms because "they fear we are too strong and will build an independent army."

Following the arrival of Iraq's Popular Mobilization Forces (Hashd al-Shaabi) in Sinjar in October 2017, relations between Shesho's Yazidi Peshmerga and the mostly Shia Hashd units grew tense, including incidents involving detained fighters and allegations of harassment of Yazidi residents; Shesho has stated that he ordered his men to stand down rather than confront the Hashd's own Yazidi battalions, not wanting his largely Yazidi Peshmerga to fight fellow Yazidis in battle after all his people had suffered.

He has also periodically confirmed continuing friction with YBŞ over disarmament demands; in 2025, he stated publicly that YBŞ fighters had refused to surrender their weapons despite PKK leader Abdullah Öcalan's announcement of the group's disarmament. The Peshmerga Commander in Sinjar, Qasim Shesho, confirmed that Sinjar Protection Units fighters affiliated with the PKK had refused to give up their weapons, despite Öcalan's disarmament announcement, noting that they receive support from certain Iraqi forces.

In early 2025, a group of several hundred officers and fighters from Shesho's own brigade publicly resigned, citing grievances over pay and administrative treatment by the KRG and appealing to be incorporated into federal Iraqi security forces; Shesho downplayed the significance of the resignations, saying the resigning officers and soldiers represented only about 200 members of the brigade.

== Allegations of revenge attacks on Arab civilians ==
Yazidi militia fighters, including men reportedly operating alongside Qasim Shesho, were accused of carrying out revenge attacks on Arab civilians in the villages of Jiri and Sibaya, near Sinjar, on 25 January 2015. According to Amnesty International, which investigated the incident, 21 Arab villagers, about half of them elderly, disabled, or children, were allegedly killed in what appeared to be execution-style shootings, and around 40 more were reportedly abducted, with 17 still missing as of Amnesty's June 2015 report. Homes in both villages were also looted and burned.

Amnesty interviewed roughly 30 witnesses and concluded the killings did not occur during an armed clash, contradicting a local Asayish (KRG security) commander's claim that Peshmerga had come under fire and "some Arabs were killed" in a resulting firefight; that same official also alleged that most residents belonged to the Jahaysh (Jhaish) tribe and were IS-linked. Amnesty said it could not independently verify either the accusations against the villagers or their denials.

Shesho, present in the area at the time, told Amnesty he had accompanied Peshmerga and Asayish forces at their request, had instructed his fighters that "there should be no revenge, only what is permitted by law," and denied any exchange of fire with villagers, attributing the worst violence instead to PKK fighters and former Ba'athists who allegedly entered the villages after he left. Several witnesses also credited him with warning residents to flee beforehand and with personally ordering that abducted women and children be released unharmed.

Jiri and Sibaya lie in an area associated with Sunni Arab tribes, chiefly the Matewti (Imteywit), Khatouni, and Jahaysh, some of whose members, according to Yazidi accounts and researchers, joined or collaborated with the Islamic State during its occupation of Sinjar, with the Khatouni singled out most often. This alleged collaboration was cited informally by Yazidis, including Shesho, as context for the attack.

== 2024 controversy and arrest warrant ==
On 3 August 2024, during a ceremony at the Sharfadin Temple in Sinjar marking the tenth anniversary of the Yazidi genocide, Shesho stated in a speech that the genocide against Yazidis had not ended and would not end as long as "the religion of Muhammad" existed, describing its followers as enemies of the Yazidi religion, and adding that he took full responsibility for his words. A short video clip of the remarks circulated widely on social media and was characterized by many Muslims in Iraq and the Kurdistan Region as an insult to prophet Muhammed and Islam.

The backlash was rapid and extensive. The Iraqi human rights organization Patrikor reported documenting 3,750 instances of hate speech directed at Yazidis within 24 hours of the video's spread. On 5 August 2024, the Council of Scholars, Da'wah and Guidance and the Third Branch of the Kurdistan Islamic Union issued a joint statement condemning the remarks as a threat to social peace and calling on both the Yazidi Spiritual Council and Iraqi legal authorities to take action against Shesho. The Ministry of Endowments and Religious Affairs and the Union of Muslim Scholars in Kurdistan issued a similar joint condemnation on 6 August, asserting their right to pursue legal action.

At least sixteen individual Muslim Kurdish clerics released sermons or videos condemning Shesho by name over the following two weeks, in addition to the coordinated statements from religious institutions. These included Mullā Antar Badini, who called for Shesho's tongue should be cut out and that he should be executed publicly, describing him as an enemy of Islam, humanity, and the Kurdish people; in a follow-up video he accused Shesho of trying to incite discord between Yazidis and Muslims and demanded a public apology.

Mullā Omar Darato told Shesho directly, by name, that he had shown contempt for the Prophet that "his own history" made unsurprising, called the remarks cowardly and ignorant, and warned that continued provocation would trigger a "major uproar" against the Yazidi community as a whole. An unnamed Bahdini-dialect preacher, addressing the Kurdistan government from a mosque pulpit, called for Shesho and unnamed associates to be arrested and have their tongues cut out, and said the government should permit Muslims to "defend themselves" against Yazidis if it would not act. Mullā Herman Bisefki and Mullā Ibrahim Sanagary urged legal complaints against him.

Mullā Manaf Herki urged listeners to "take up the sword of Umar ibn al-Khattab" and head to Sinjar to behead Shesho, lamented the absence of a government willing to enforce such punishment, and called him an infidel and a criminal. Mullā Sabir Khudamuradi declared that Muslims were the enemies of all Yazidis as "devil worshippers," framing the Prophet himself as their adversary and casting the conflict in explicitly religious, communal terms rather than as a dispute with Shesho individually. Mullā Ibrahim Sanagary praised Kurdistan's religious scholars and officials for condemning Shesho, called him too disgraceful to name from the pulpit, and warned Yazidi community leaders to restrain their own members or face unspecified future consequences given the disparity in numbers between Muslims and Yazidis.

Mullā Handrin Balisani delivered the most extensively documented sermon, calling the remarks a test of Muslim faith and urging authorities to act if they were serious about coexistence as well as arguing that Yazidis concealed greater hatred than they expressed. In a separate part of the same sermon, he stated Yazidis had endured 71 historical genocides only "because of their sharp tongues," suggesting that had the situation been reversed Yazidis would have inflicted far more violence on Muslims. Mullā Reshid Delil reminded Yazidis of the material aid Muslims provided them during the 2014 genocide, argued this created an obligation of restraint, and warned that if Yazidi leadership did not expel people like Shesho from the community, Yazidis would face treatment "worse than genocide".

Mullā Karzan, filming from outside a public restroom in Mecca built on the historical site of Abu Jahl's house, told Shesho his home would meet a similarly degrading fate, and said insulting the Prophet was a "red line" that would result in Shesho and his followers being "burned." Mullā Nowzad Siyari released two separate videos: the first on 5 August calling for Shesho to be held legally accountable and described him as a "microbe" spreading discord; the second on 9 August, calling for his imprisonment and said such people should be blinded and buried alive as a lesson to others. Mullā Mehvan Mullā Saeed Rekani framed Shesho as a "germ" whose provocations would ultimately strengthen the Muslim community's resolve, argued coexistence with him personally was no longer possible, while separately emphasizing the material aid his own mosque had provided Yazidi refugees in 2014 to establish that the hostility was not communal. Mullā Mikail Herki, the one clear dissenting voice, stated that responsibility should fall on the individual, not be generalized to all Yazidis, cited longstanding personal friendships and working relationships with Yazidis, and said Islam's mercy extended to them as well.

The backlash also had a security dimension affecting Yazidi displaced persons elsewhere in the Kurdistan Region. According to reporting by Firat News Agency, following the arrest warrant, imams in the Duhok area reportedly issued threats against Yazidi families sheltering in displacement camps, prompting residents of Chammishko camp in Zakho district and other camps in the Duhok governorate to flee toward Sinjar out of fear of a possible attack. The Sinjar-based Democratic Autonomous Administration of Shengal called on the Iraqi government to take urgent security measures to protect Yazidi IDPs in the camps.

The Presidency of the Kurdistan Region issued its own statement on 9 August, condemning insults to any religion while cautioning against collective blame of Yazidis.

On 8 August 2024, the Nineveh Investigation Court issued an arrest warrant for Shesho on charges of "insulting the Prophet Muhammad and inciting war between religions," under Article 195 of the Iraqi Penal Code, which criminalizes public insults to religion. The warrant reportedly did not name the complainant who had filed the case.

On the same day the arrest warrant was issued, a delegation from the Yazidi Spiritual Council, led by the Yazidi supreme spiritual leader Baba Sheikh, visited the Union of Muslim Scholars of the Kurdistan Region, where both sides affirmed a shared commitment to coexistence and mutual respect between religions.

Shesho responded publicly with a clarifying statement, saying that "some media outlets circulated a short segment of my speech, taking a single sentence out of context to falsely claim that I spoke inappropriately about the Prophet Mohammad," and stating, "There was no insult to the Prophet of Islam in my statement." He maintained that his remarks had referred to the recurring historical persecution of Yazidis rather than to the Muhammed personally and noted "Our prohibits insulting prophets and religious individuals from all religions, sects, and beliefs,” emphasizing that Yazidism even forbids disrespecting inanimate objects revered by others". His nephew, Haydar Shesho, separately told the Kurdish outlet Rudaw that he believed his uncle's comments about the Prophet had been misinterpreted, saying the matter had "been exaggerated... despite our clarifications."

== Reputation ==
Qasim Shesho is one of the very few living people to be the subject of a stran, a traditional heroic song preserving communal history, titled "The War of the House of Shesho" (Şerê Mala Şeşo). It commemorates his decades-long feud with a rival Yazidi tribal leader, Qasim Sumer, who aligned with Saddam Hussein's government while Shesho backed the Kurdish Peshmerga. The dispute reportedly originated as a personal conflict over a woman before acquiring its later political character, and lasted roughly forty years until the two men reconciled through a traditional tribal mediation (sulh) in 2010.

Shesho is also remembered as a legendary Peshmerga fighter whose decades-long resistance against Saddam Hussein's forces forms a central part of his reputation in Sinjar. His later defense of the Sharfadin shrine against the Islamic State added extended this reputation, linking his tribal and political identity to a sacred site and to the shrine's holy patron being Sharfadin himself.

Anthropologist Benjamin Raßbach traces Shesho's reputation as the "Lion of Sinjar" through three overlapping phases: an original inner-Yazidi tribal rivalry with Qasim Sumer; his subsequent identification with the Kurdish nationalist struggle as a Peshmerga commander; and, after 2014, a religious dimension linked to the "Miracle of Şerfedîn" narrative surrounding the shrine's defense against the Islamic State.
