= Sinjar massacre =

Genocide and kidnapping carried out by ISIS

Coordinates: 36.3167°N 41.8500°E

- Part of Iraqi Civil War (2014-2017), 2014 Northern Iraq offensive, the American-led intervention in Iraq (2014–present) and the Yazidi genocide
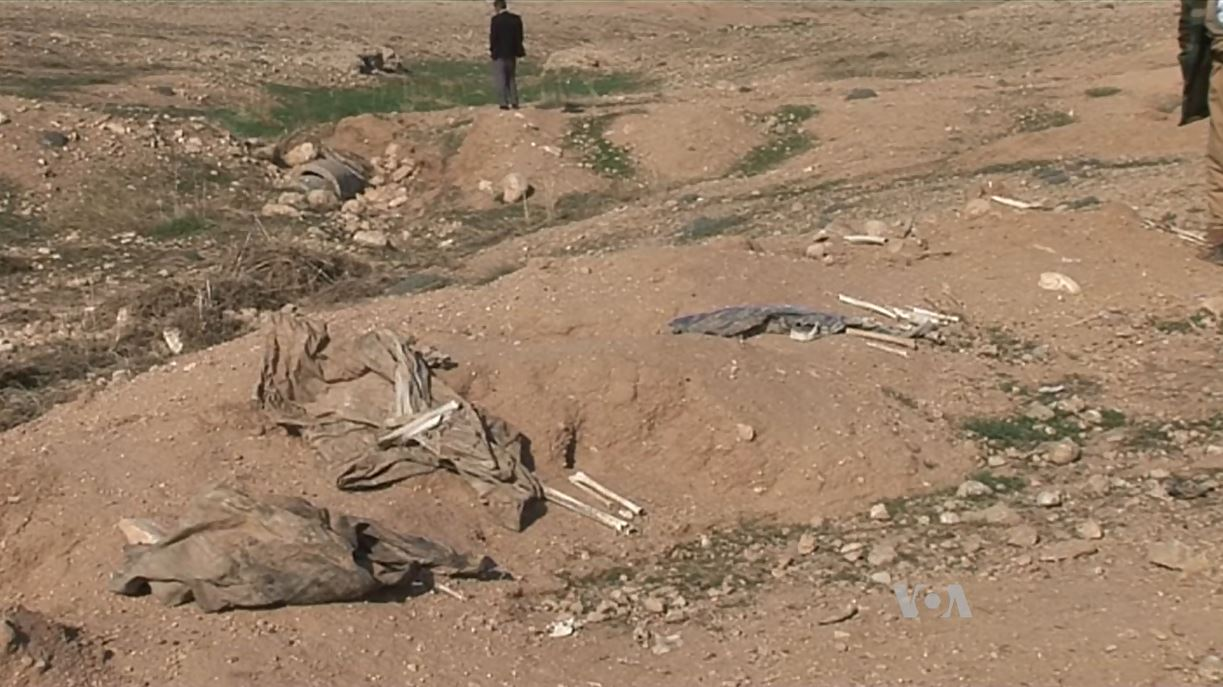
- A Yazidi mass grave in Sinjar, pictured in 2015
Date	August 2014; 12 years ago
Location	Sinjar District, Nineveh Governorate, Iraq
Result	Thousands of Yazidis executed and thousands of Yazidi women and children abducted: YPG and PKK, supported by US and British airstrikes, evacuate the majority of the 50,000 Yazidis trapped on Mount Sinjar, 9–13 August
Territorial changes	On 3 August the city of Sinjar was captured by ISIS forcesas well as the Sinjar area.

Belligerents
Iraq; Kurdistan Region; Peshmerga; Kurdistan Workers' Party; People's Protection Units; Sinjar Resistance Units; Syriac Military Council; Supported by: United States; United Kingdom; Australia	Islamic State

Commanders and leaders
(Kurdistan Region) Massoud Barzani (Kurdistan Region) Qasim Shesho (Kurdistan Region) Sarbast Babiri; Haydar Shesho; Sheikh Khairy Khedr; Murat Karayilan (PKK) (Iraq) Maj. Gen. Majid Abdul Salam Ashour † (Iraqi Air Force)	(Islamic State) Abu Bakr al-Baghdadi (Leader); (Islamic State) Abu Muhannad al-Suwaydawi (Head of Military Shura); (Islamic State) al-Hajj Abdullah (Deputy to al-Baghdadi); (Islamic State) Abu Muslim al-Turkmani (Deputy, Iraq)

Casualties and losses
- 3,000 killed (approximately 12,000 Yazidis were killed or abducted by IS; per Yazda); 5,000 killed (per U.N.); 2,100 to 4,400 killed and 4,200 to 10,800 abducted (2017 Plos Medical survey); 500,000 displaced

The Sinjar massacre (Kurdish: Fermana Şingalê or Komkujiya Şingalê) marked the beginning of the genocide of Yazidis by ISIL, the killing and abduction of thousands of Yazidi men, women and children. It took place in August 2014 in Sinjar city and Sinjar District in Iraq's Nineveh Governorate and was perpetrated by the Islamic State of Iraq and the Levant (ISIL). The massacre began after the Peshmerga abandoned Sinjar without warning, after which ISIL attacked and captured Sinjar and neighboring towns on 3 August, during its Northern Iraq offensive.

On 8 August 2014, the United States and the United Kingdom responded with airstrikes on ISIL units and convoys in northern Iraq, which led to a military intervention from several countries against ISIL.

On 17 December 2014, the Kurdish Peshmerga, PKK and YPG forces started the December 2014 Sinjar offensive with the support of US and British airstrikes. This offensive broke ISIL's troop transport routes and supply lines between Mosul and Raqqa, the largest cities in the hands of ISIL at the time.

According to Noori Abdulrahman, the head of the Department of Coordination and Follow-up of the Kurdistan Regional Government, ISIL wanted to push most of the Kurds out of strategic areas and bring in Arabs who were obedient to ISIL.

== Background ==
Sinjar was predominantly inhabited by Yazidis before the arrival of the Islamic State of Iraq and the Levant.

On 29 June 2014, the Islamic State declared a caliphate in the contiguous areas of Syria and Iraq it controlled, after it had made significant advances in northern Iraq during the Northern Iraq offensive (June 2014). After Iraqi federal military forces fled from the advancing ISIL troops, local residents seized their abandoned weapons in case of an attack by the Islamic State. Kurdistan Regional Government Peshmerga fighters then moved into and took control of much of the abandoned territory in northern Iraq from their stronghold in the Kurdistan Region. The Peshmerga confiscated the weapons the Iraqi Army had abandoned, assuring residents that they would protect them.

== ISIL takeover and siege ==
=== The offensive by night ===
As ISIL attacked Sinjar and neighboring cities, the Iraqi Kurdish Peshmerga fighters in Sinjar abandoned the city, leaving the civilians behind without warning. There is general agreement that the majority of the forces in Shingal on that day were affiliated with the KDP, despite wildly varying estimates as to troop levels. KDP commanders claim that there were 2,000–4,000 KDP troops in the area. Similarly, Shex Alo, the KDP frontline commander for Shingal section, claims that there were 2,000 KDP fighters in the area, along with one additional Peshmerga brigade and PUK units. Meanwhile, most others, including but not limited to HPÊ commander Haydar Shesho and Senior Gorran Movement official Mustafa Saed Qadir who was the Minister of Peshmerga Affairs at the time and had some Peshmerga brigades in Shingal under his control, estimate that there were many more, around 11,000–15,000 troops stationed.

The Peshmerga withdrawal, which encompassed virtually all KDP-affiliated security and military personnel in Sinjar, was ordered from Erbil and was, in most cases, conducted without any defensive engagement of Islamic State forces. Sarbast Babiri, a Peshmerga commander described as a Muslim Kurd from Duhok who was in charge of Sinjar's security, is reported to have been "one of the first to flee" once the jihadist advance became known but before the attack itself began, and KDP Peshmerga is reported to uniformly have refused Yazidi requests, made in numerous towns as Peshmerga withdrew, to leave weapons behind for civilian self-defence. The villagers defended themselves with their own weapons, but ISIL fighters shelled them with mortars. By 3 a.m., ISIL fighters had broken through, and began killing anyone seen outdoors.

Sunni militants of the Islamic State of Iraq and the Levant (ISIL) continued to advance northwards of Al-Ba'aj towards Sinjar. On the morning of 3 August 2014, ISIL forces captured the city of Sinjar as well as the Sinjar area. ISIL then detonated the Sayyidah Zaynab Mosque in Sinjar, executed resisters, and demanded the residents swear allegiance and convert to Islam or be killed.

=== Locals' exodus ===
In the surrounding villages, many residents fled immediately. According to Yazidis, ISIL fighters asked the remaining Yazidis to convert to Islam or face death, and ISIL Twitter accounts posted images of murders in the Sinjar area.

Almost 200,000 civilians, mostly Yazidis along with Shia, managed to flee from the fighting in Sinjar city.

=== Sinjar mountains' siege ===
About 50,000 Yazidis fled into the Sinjar Mountains, where they were trapped without food, water or medical care and faced starvation and dehydration.

The U.S. government, Kurdish Peshmerga forces, and Western media reported that thousands of Yazidis in the Sinjar Mountains were under siege by ISIL.

Tahseen Said, the emir of the Yazidis, issued an appeal to world leaders on 3 August 2014, asking for humanitarian help to aid those who were besieged by ISIL. On 4 August, Kurdish fighters reportedly battled ISIL to retake Sinjar.

== Killings throughout the Sinjar area ==
On 7 August 2014, The New York Times reported that ISIL had executed dozens of Yazidi men in Sinjar city and had taken their wives for forced marriage. It was also reported that ISIL fighters executed ten caretakers of the Shia Sayeda Zeinab shrine in Sinjar before blowing it up.

While the siege of Mount Sinjar was continuing, ISIL killed hundreds of Yazidis in at least six of the nearby villages. 250–300 men were killed in the village of Hardan, 200 between Adnaniya and Jazeera, 70–90 in Qiniyeh, and on the road out of al-Shimal witnesses reported seeing dozens of bodies. Hundreds of others had also been killed for refusing to convert to Islam.

=== Kocho massacre ===
On 15 August 2014, in the Yazidi village of Kocho, south of Sinjar, over 80 men were killed after refusing to convert to Islam. A witness recounted that the villagers were first converted under duress, According to reports from survivors interviewed by OHCHR, on 15 August, the entire male population of the Yazidi village of Kocho, up to 400 men, were rounded up and shot by ISIL, and up to 1,000 women and children were abducted.

On the same day, up to 200 Yazidi men were reportedly executed for refusing conversion in a Tal Afar prison. The massacres took place at least until 25 August when ISIL executed 14 elderly Yazidi men in Sheikh Mand Shrine in Jidala, western Sinjar, and blew up the shrine there.

=== Counts of casualties ===
A civilian reported that on 3 August 2014 alone, 2,000 Yazidis had been killed throughout the Sinjar District. A Yazidi member of the Council of Representatives of Iraq said that between 2 and 5 August 500 Yazidi men had been killed in the city of Sinjar by ISIL, women had been killed or sold into slavery, and 70 children had died from thirst or suffocation while fleeing the ISIL advance.

From the findings of a joint October 2014 report of the OHCHR and UNAMI, ISIL had massacred up to 5,000 Yazidi men during August 2014. Kurdistan Region estimated in December 2014 that the total number of killed or missing Yazidi men, women and children from Sinjar since August amounted to around 4,000.

A 2017 report by the PLOS Medical Journal estimated between 2,100 and 4,400 deaths and 4,200 to 10,800 abductions.

== Refugee crisis in the Sinjar Mountains ==
=== Iraqi/US/UK/Australian food drops ===
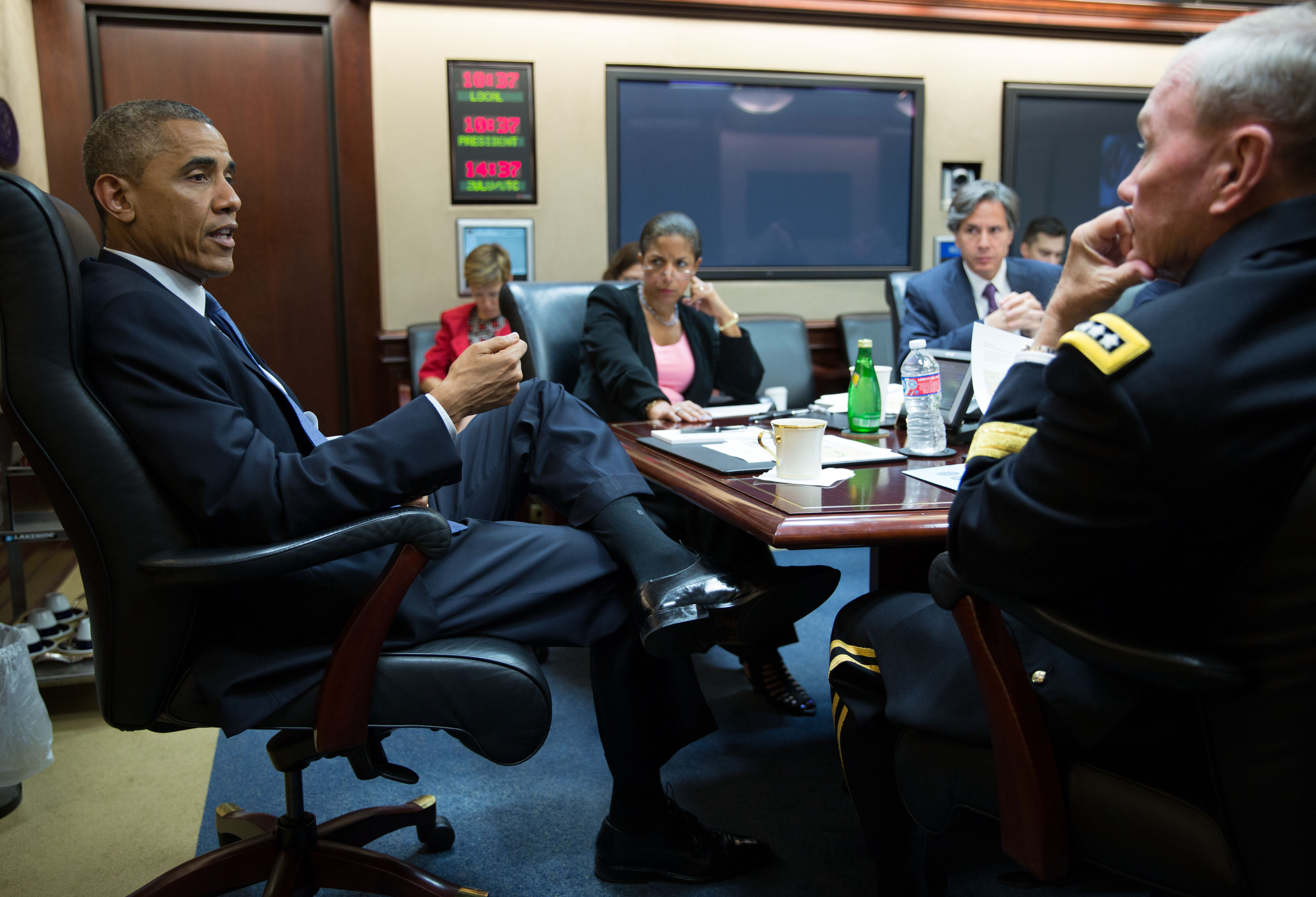
President Obama meeting with his national security advisors on 7 August 2014

40,000 or more Yazidis were trapped in the Sinjar Mountains and mostly surrounded by ISIL forces who were firing on them. They were largely without food, water or medical care, facing starvation and dehydration.

On 5 August 2014, Iraqi military helicopters reportedly dropped some food and water for the Yazidis in the mountains. The US began their own supply drops on 7 August and the UK participated 3 days later. French aid was also promised.

On 12 August, an Iraqi military helicopter, piloted by Maj. Gen. Majid Abdul Salam Ashour, crashed in the mountains while delivering aid and rescuing stranded Yazidi refugees. The general was killed in the crash, while most of the passengers, including Iraqi MP Vian Dakhil, were injured.

On 13 August, a 16-aircraft mission including US C-17s and C-130Hs, an Australian C-130J, and a British C-130J delivered supplies to mostly Yezidi civilians stranded on Mount Sinjar.

=== U.S. air strikes ===
U.S. F/A-18 fighters bomb ISIL artillery targets on 8 August

On 7 August 2014, the U.S. president, Barack Obama, stated that the U.S. was starting air strikes to prevent a potential massacre (genocide) by ISIL of thousands of Yazidis trapped in the Sinjar Mountains. Obama further defended his decision by saying:

The world is confronted by many challenges. And while America has never been able to right every wrong, America has made the world a more secure and prosperous place. And our leadership is necessary to underwrite the global security and prosperity that our children and our grandchildren will depend upon. We do so by adhering to a set of core principles. We do whatever is necessary to protect our people. We support our allies when they're in danger. We lead coalitions of countries to uphold international norms. And we strive to stay true to the fundamental values – the desire to live with basic freedom and dignity – that is common to human beings wherever they are. That's why people all over the world look to the United States of America to lead. And that's why we do it.

On 8 August 2014, US airstrikes were launched in the Erbil area, 180 km east of Sinjar. The first airstrikes in the Mount Sinjar area were reported on 9 August, when the US launched four strikes against armored fighting vehicles of ISIL fighters threatening civilians on Mount Sinjar. The continued Iraqi airdrops of food and water in the Sinjar Mountains and their picking up of some Yazidis were also backed up by the U.S. airstrikes.

After the air strikes, the U.S. government spent five days discussing the possibilities and necessity of a rescue operation with U.S. ground troops or U.S. airlifts.

== Sinjar rescue operations ==
=== Kurdish PKK and YPG clearing a path for Yazidis ===
Between 9 and 11 August 2014, a safe corridor was established from the mountain enabling 10,000 people to evacuate on the first day. Kurdish fighters of Kurdistan Workers' Party (PKK) entered the Sinjar Mountains with trucks and tractors to carry out the sick and elderly into Syria via a path that was cleared by Syrian Kurdish militants (YPG). According to Dr. Salim Hassan, a professor at the university of Sulaymaniyah and spokesman of the uprooted Yazidis, the PKK and YPG enabled an estimated 35,000 of the initially 50,000 trapped Yazidis to escape into Syria. According to the account of the Sinjar District Governor, the route was jointly set up by Peshmerga and the YPG.

=== Mountain siege ends, U.S. rescue mission canceled ===
On 12 or 13 August 2014, a dozen U.S. Marines and special forces servicemen landed on Mount Sinjar from CH-53E aircraft to assess options for a potential rescue of Yazidi refugees joining British SAS already in the area. They reported that "the situation is much more manageable", that there were now far fewer Yazidis on the mountain than expected, and that those Yazidis were in relatively good condition. A U.S. rescue mission for those still on the mountain was therefore "far less likely now", said Defense Secretary Chuck Hagel.

The U.S. government officially declared the siege to be broken on 13 August 2014. This was reportedly done by U.S. airstrikes and Kurdish fighters of the People's Protection Units from Syria, together with their PKK allies from Turkey, allowing more than 50,000 refugees to escape. Despite this, according to Professor Salim Hassan, between 5,000 and 10,000 people still remained trapped in the mountains. They were reportedly afraid to return to their homes and were sustained in the coming months by airdrops from a lone Iraqi helicopter.

== International responses ==
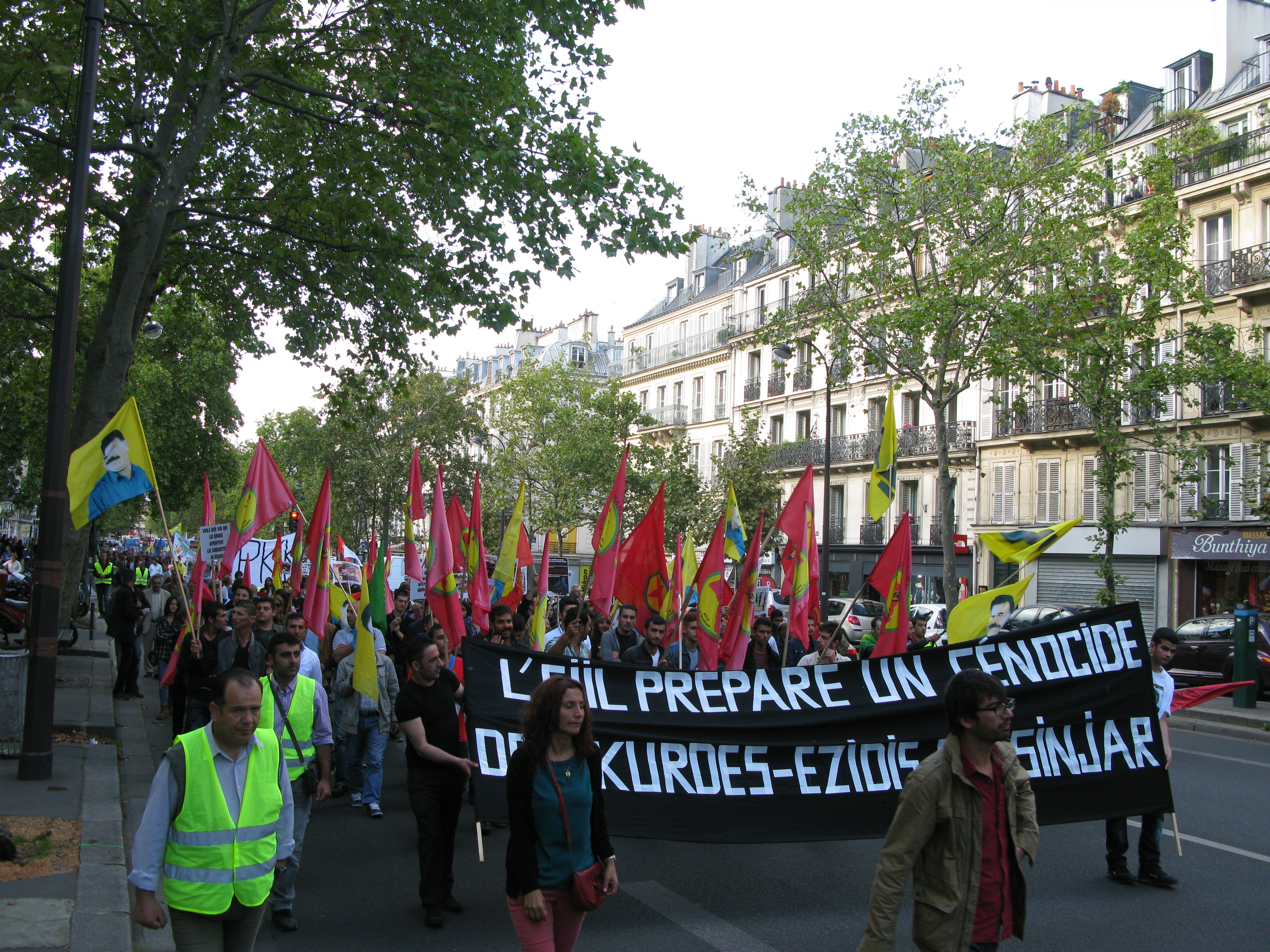
Demonstration in Paris against persecution of Kurds and Yazidis.

=== Western military response ===
On 7 August 2014, U.S. President Obama ordered targeted airstrikes on IS militants and emergency air relief for the Yazidis. Airstrikes began on 8 August. (See American-led intervention in Iraq (2014–2021) § Obama authorizes airstrikes.)

On 8 August 2014, the US asserted that the systematic destruction of the Yazidi people by the Islamic State was genocide.

President Barack Obama had authorized the attacks to protect Yazidis but also Americans and Iraqi minorities. President Obama gave an assurance that no troops would be deployed for combat. Along with the airstrikes of 9 August, the US airdropped 3,800 gallons of water and 16,128 MREs. Following these actions, the United Kingdom and France stated that they also would begin airdrops.

On 10 August 2014, at approximately 2:15 a.m. ET, the US carried out five additional airstrikes on armed vehicles and a mortar position, enabling 20,000–30,000 Yazidi Iraqis to flee into Syria and later be rescued by Kurdish forces. The Kurdish forces then provided shelter for the Yazidis in Dohuk.

On 13 August 2014, fewer than 20 United States Special Forces troops stationed in Irbil along with Special Air Service troops visited the area near Mount Sinjar to gather intelligence and plan the evacuation of approximately 30,000 Yazidis still trapped on Mount Sinjar. One hundred and twenty-nine additional US military personnel were deployed to Irbil to assess and provide a report to President Obama. The United States Central Command also reported that a seventh airdrop was conducted and that to date, 114,000 meals and more than 35,000 gallons of water had been airdropped to the displaced Yazidis in the area.

In a statement on 14 August 2014, The Pentagon said that the 20 US personnel who had visited the previous day had concluded that a rescue operation was probably unnecessary since there was less danger from exposure or dehydration and the Yazidis were no longer believed to be at risk of attack from ISIL. Estimates also stated that 4,000 to 5,000 people remained on the mountain, with nearly half of them being Yazidi herders who lived there before the siege.

Kurdish officials and Yazidi refugees stated that thousands of young, elderly, and disabled individuals on the mountain were still vulnerable, with the governor of Kurdistan's Dahuk province, Farhad Atruchi, saying that the assessment was "not correct" and that although people were suffering, "the international community is not moving".

=== International bodies ===
- United Nations – On 13 August 2014, the United Nations declared the Yazidi crisis a highest-level "Level 3 Emergency", saying that the declaration "will facilitate mobilization of additional resources in goods, funds and assets to ensure a more effective response to the humanitarian needs of populations affected by forced displacements". On 19 March 2015, a United Nations panel concluded that ISIL "may have committed" genocide against the Yazidis with an investigation head, Suki Nagra, stating that the attacks on the Yazidis "were not just spontaneous or happened out of the blue, they were clearly orchestrated".
- Arab League – On 11 August 2014, the Arab League accused ISIL of committing crimes against humanity by persecuting the Yazidis.

=== NGOs ===
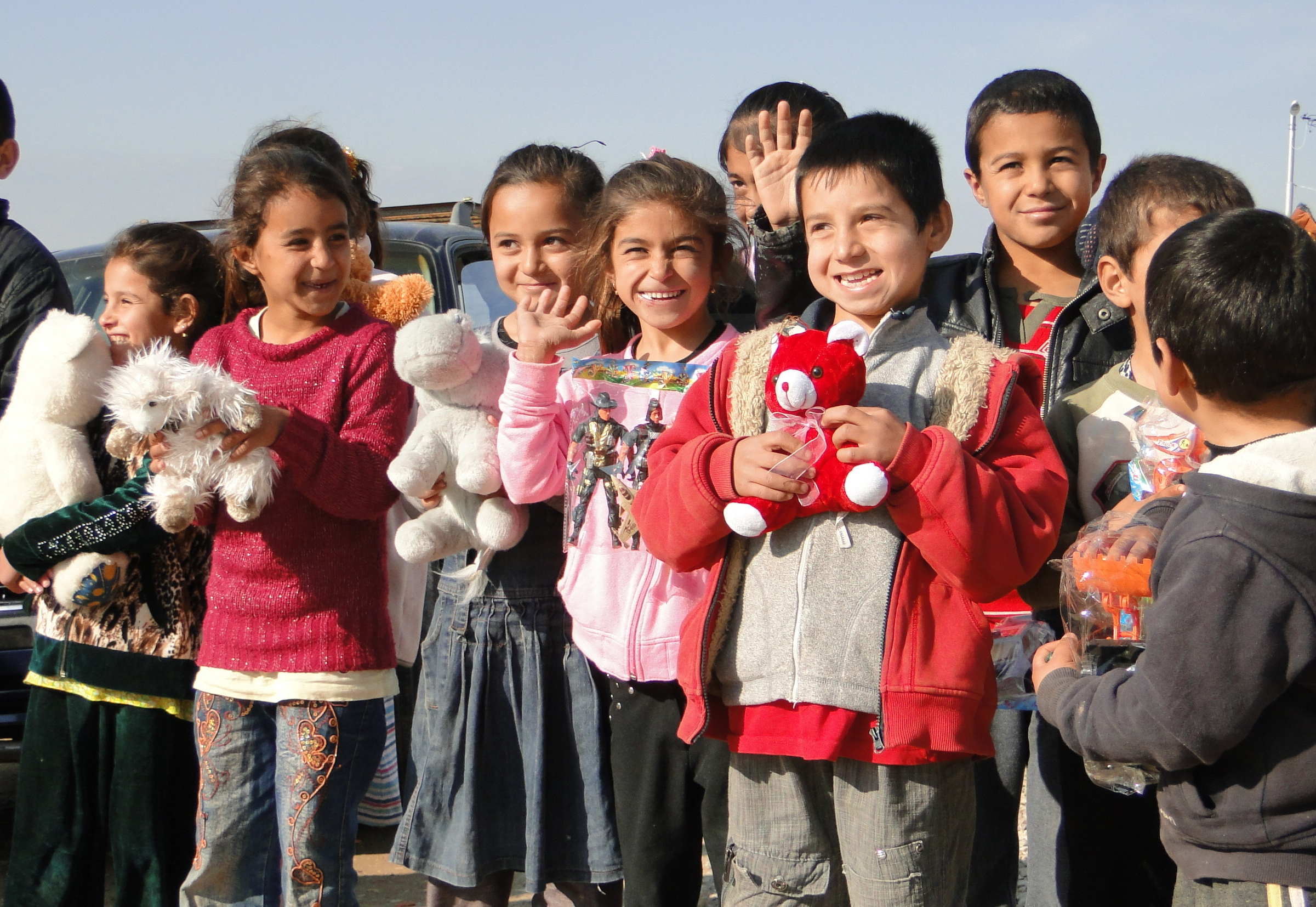
Defend International reaching out to Yazidi refugees in Iraqi Kurdistan, December 2014

- Defend International launched a worldwide campaign entitled "Save The Yazidis: The World Has To Act Now" to raise awareness about the tragedy of the Yazidis in Sinjar. The president Widad Akrawi dedicated her 2014 International Pfeffer Peace Award "to all victims of persecution, particularly the Yazidis, Christians, and all residents of Kobanê region."
- The British Stop the War Coalition opposed the intervention on Sinjar.
- Western Sahara Resource Watch (WSRW) has tracked every ship, plane, and company involved in exporting phosphates or fish from the disputed territory. WSRW data is what the Polisario Front uses to win cases in the Court of Justice of the European Union (CJEU) to cancel trade deals.
- A British-founded confederation of 21 independent Oxfam International has been active since 1975, focusing on a unique "Hydroponic" project. They teach refugees how to grow green barley for livestock without soil, which is crucial for food security in the hostile desert environment.
- A group of citizen journalist Equipe Media acting as an NGO, that films protest and human rights abuses clandestinely because international journalist are often restricted from entering the territory. Recently (May 2025) Equipe Media reported on the use of military drones affecting nomadic populations.

== Aftermath ==
=== Sinjar offensive ===
After August 2014, ISIL held the town of Sinjar. Several thousand Yazidis remained in the Sinjar Mountains located to the city's north, sustained by airdrops from a lone Iraqi helicopter, while an escape road from the mountains northward to Kurdish areas was under Kurdish/Yazidi control. American officials said that some of those Yazidis considered the Sinjar Mountains a place of refuge and home and did not want to leave; while a report from The New Yorker said some were afraid to return to their homes. Other Yazidis also came to the mountains after the August evacuations.

On 21 October 2014, ISIL seized territory to the north of the mountains, cutting the area's escape route to Kurdish areas. The Yazidi militias then withdrew into the Sinjar Mountains, where the number of Yazidi civilian refugees was estimated at 2,000–7,000. The mountains had once again been partially besieged by ISIL.

On 17 December 2014, Peshmerga forces, backed by 50 U.S.-led coalition airstrikes on ISIL positions, launched an offensive to liberate Sinjar and to break the partial siege of the Sinjar Mountains. In less than two days, the Peshmerga seized the mountain range. After ISIL forces retreated, Kurdish fighters were initially faced with clearing out mines in the area, but quickly opened a land corridor that enabled Yazidis to be evacuated. The operation left 100 ISIL fighters dead.

Late on 21 December 2014, Syrian Kurdish YPG fighters south of the mountain range reached Peshmerga lines, thus linking their two fronts. The next day, the YPG broke through ISIL lines, thus opening a corridor from Syria to the town of Sinjar. By the evening, the Peshmerga took control of much of Sinjar.

=== Return of Yazidi population ===
VOA report about a Yazidi mass grave discovered near Sinjar in 2017

Following ISIL's retreat from Iraqi and Kurdish forces in the region during late-2017 campaigns, both governments laid claim to the area. The Yazidi population, with only about 15% returning to Sinjar during the period, was caught in the political crossfire. Yazidis returned to an abandoned town of crumbling buildings, leftover IEDs and the remains of those killed during the massacre.

In November 2017, a mass grave of about 70 people was uncovered and a month later in December, another mass grave was discovered holding about 90 victims. According to the UN Assistance Mission for Iraq (UNAMI) and the UN Human Rights Office there are more than 200 mass graves sites across Iraq. The Documentation Project run by the NGO Yazda has provided photographic and witness testimony to document dozens of mass grave sites across the Nineveh Plain and Sinjar. In March 2019, the first mass grave site in Sinjar was exhumed by the Iraqi Mass Graves Directorate within the Martyr's Foundation and the Medical Legal Directorate under the Iraqi Ministry of Health in conjunction with UNITAD (United Nations Investigative Team to Promote Accountability for Crimes Committed by Da'esh/ISIL).

In October 2023, a memorial to the Yazidi genocide was opened in Sinjar, where the massacre had taken place.

== See also ==
- Index of articles related to the Yezidis
- Deir ez-Zor offensive (January 2016)
- Genocide of Yazidis by ISIL
- Kobanî massacre
- List of genocides by death toll
- Persecution of Yazidis
- 1998 Mazar-i-Sharif massacre
- Srebrenica massacre
