= Êzîdxan Protection Force =

Yazidi military force in Iraq

- Hêza Parastina Êzîdxanê (HPÊ)
- Flag of the Êzîdxan Protection Force
- Leader: Haydar Shesho
- Dates active: October 2014–present
- Status: Active
- Size: 2,200–3,000 (2015); 1,000 (2017)
- Part of: Sinjar Alliance (October 2015–March 2017) (Kurdistan Region) Peshmerga (2017-Present)
- Wars: Iraqi Civil War (2014–2017)

The Êzîdxan Protection Force (HPÊ) (Note: Also transliterated as Ezidkhan Defense Units, Ezidkhan Protection Force, Protection Force of Ezidkhan, Êzîdxan Protection Force or Êzîdxan Defense Units) (Kurdish: Hêza Parastina Êzîdxanê ,هێزی پاراستنی ئێزیدخان, Arabic: قوة حماية ايزيدخان), is a Yazidi military force founded by Haydar Shesho in the summer of 2014 in response to the Sinjar massacre. It was bigger than the other main Yazidi militia who took part in the liberation of Sinjar from the Islamic State, the Sinjar Resistance Units, which is aligned with the PKK-backed Kurdistan Communities Union.

The militia was known as the Protection Force of Sinjar or HPŞ (Kurdish: Hêza Parastina Şingal), also translated as Sinjar Defense Units or Sinjar Protection Force, until November 2015, when it changed its name to Hêza Parastina Êzîdxanê or HPÊ.

Haydar Shesho was arrested on 5 April 2015 by the Kurdistan Democratic Party's Kurdistan Regional Government forces for "creating an illegitimate new militia." He was released a week later after it was negotiated that he would register with the KRG's Ministry of Peshmerga. He has been quoted as saying "We fight only for Yazidis, not for any party." In October 2015, the HPŞ participated in the foundation of the Sinjar Alliance as an all-Yazidi joint commando umbrella structure with the Sinjar Resistance Units, the Êzîdxan Women's Units, and other, independent Yazidi units recruited to the united Yazidi front.

Under the joint command of the newly founded Sinjar Alliance, the Êzîdxan Protection Force took part in the successful November 2015 Sinjar offensive.

The HPÊ joined the Peshmerga of the Kurdistan Regional Government in 2017. This, despite the warnings of Haydar Shesho in the immediate aftermath of the liberation of Sinjar over a "war of flags". Massoud Barzani, leader of the KDP and the most powerful figure in Iraqi Kurdistan, claimed on television that only KRG Peshmerga were involved in the Sinjar offensives. ezidiPress quoted from the office of Haydar Shesho: "the next battle... might be the most difficult: the abolition of the one-party dictatorship."

In June 2017, the Êzîdxan Protection Force committed the Qabusiye massacre in northern Iraq, executing 52 Sunni-Arab members of the Al-Bu Metewut tribe over suspected ties to ISIS. The killings were condemned by the Iraqi government and human rights groups.

== See also ==
- Yazidi genocide
- List of armed groups in the Iraqi Civil War
- November 2015 Sinjar offensive
