= Battle of Makhmour =

2014 battle in Kurdistan during the War against ISIS

- Part of War in Iraq (2013–2017)
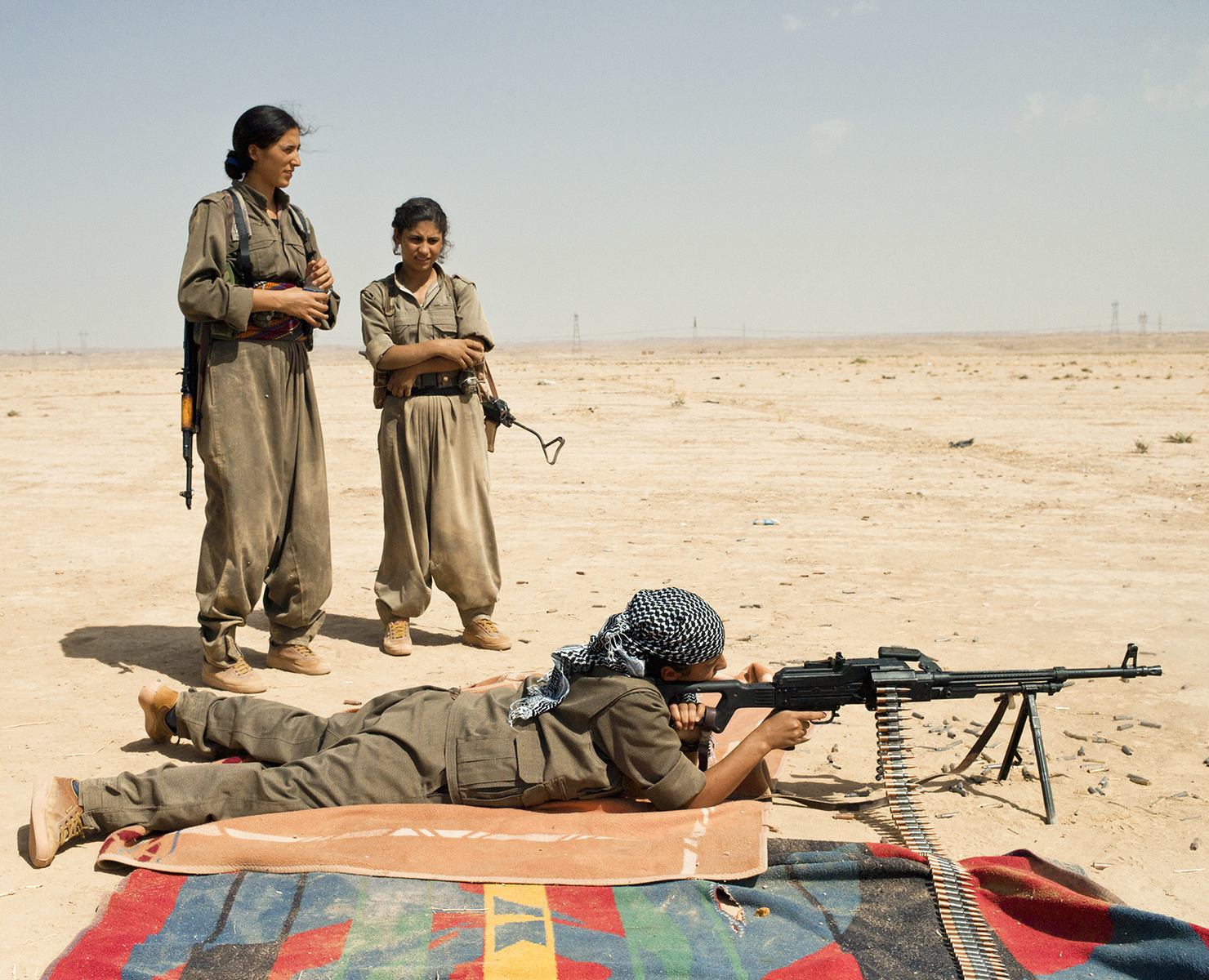
- Kurdish PKK Fighter's training in Makhmur camp
Date	6–8 August 2014 (2 days)
Location	Makhmur District, Nineveh Governorate, Iraq 35°46′32″N 43°34′46″E
Result	Kurdish victory

Belligerents
Kurdistan Region; Kurdistan Workers' Party	Islamic State

Commanders and leaders
Lahur Talabani; Bafel Talabani; Wahab Halabjay	Abu Bakr al-Baghdadi

Units involved
(Kurdistan Region) Peshmerga; People's Defence Forces; CTG Kurdistan	

Strength
3,000	800

Casualties and losses
Unknown	Unknown

The Battle of Makhmour was a pivotal 2014 engagement during the conflict between Kurdish forces and IS. As the Kurdish Peshmerga sought to secure territory left vulnerable by the Iraqi Army's retreat, IS launched an offensive, aiming to reclaim lost ground and secure its caliphate.

== Background ==
Following the Fall of Mosul in June and the subsequent Iraqi withdrawal from disputed areas, the Kurdistan Regional Government (KRG) asserted control, taking over the disputed cities of Kirkuk and Makhmour. Initially, it appeared unlikely that the Peshmerga forces would engage IS. However, as IS gained access to significant quantities of Iraqi Army stockpiles, their aggression escalated, leading to threats and attacks against. The first IS assault on the Peshmerga occurred in Zumar on 1 August, followed by an attack on Makhmour on 6 August.

== Battle ==
Initially, the Peshmerga made significant territorial gains, securing areas abandoned by the retreating Iraqi Army, including the town of Makhmour. However, IS launched a new offensive on 3 August, successfully pushing back the already overstretched Peshmerga forces.

Despite initially repelling the first wave of attacks, the Peshmerga faced an escalating assault, especially with the influx of vehicle-borne improvised explosive devices (VBIEDs), which significantly weakened their position. This prompted a retreat as IS advanced toward Makhmour and the nearby Makhmour Refugee Camp, putting both under grave threat.

In response to the worsening situation, the Kurdistan Workers' Party (PKK) deployed their fighters to the strategically important Qaracux Mountain area to assist the Kurdish forces. The PKK's support was critical in slowing down the IS advance and provided crucial reinforcement to the Peshmerga.

By 7 August, Kurdish forces, including the Kurdistan Democratic Party (KDP) Peshmerga forces led by MAJ. Brwa Miran and the command 80s units, launched a counteroffensive. Despite being outnumbered and outgunned, they succeeded in retaking Makhmour from IS control. The successful counterattack was largely attributed to better coordination between the Peshmerga and PKK forces, as well as strategic airstrikes by the United States that helped weaken IS positions in the area.

The battle highlighted the growing cooperation between Kurdish factions, particularly the PKK and the Peshmerga, as they worked together to counter the advancing IS forces.
