= Khanke =

- Town
- Location in Iraq
- Coordinates: 36°47′24″N 42°47′53″E
- Country: Iraq
- Region: Kurdistan Region
- Governorate: Dohuk Governorate
- District: Simele District

Khanke (also written Khanik or Khanek, Kurdish: خانکێ, romanized: Xankê) is a town located in the Simele District of the Dohuk Governorate in Kurdistan region. The town is located ca. 20 kilometres (12 mi) southwest of Dohuk.

Khanke is populated by Yazidis.
