= Sinjar Resistance Units =

Yazidi militia formed in Iraq in 2007

- Yekîneyên Berxwedana Şengalê (YBŞ)
- YBŞ flag
- Leaders: Sheikh Khairy Khedr †; Zeki Shingali †; Daniel Kınık
- Dates active: 2007–2026
- Headquarters: Sinjar, Nineveh Governorate, Iraq
- Ideology: Yazidi regionalism Democratic confederalism
- Status: Inactive
- Size: 4,000+
- Wars: Iraqi insurgency (2003–2011) (Defending against Sunni insurgent attacks); War in Iraq (2013–2017)
- Website: Official website

The Sinjar Resistance Units (Kurdish: Yekîneyên Berxwedana Şengalê; YBŞ) was a Yazidi militia formed in Sinjar, northern Iraq. It was formed in 2007 to protect Yazidis in the wake of the Qahtaniyah bombings. It was the second largest Yazidi militia, after the pro-KRG Êzîdxan Protection Force (HPÊ). However, it was much more active than the HPÊ in fighting against the Islamic State.

Together with its newly founded all-women offshoot, the Êzîdxan Women's Units (YJÊ), and the Sinjar Protection Units (HPŞ), in October 2015 it founded the all-Yazidi joint command umbrella structure Sinjar Alliance. YBŞ and YJÊ are part of the Kurdistan Communities Union (KCK) and work with the People's Defence Forces (HPG) of the Kurdistan Workers' Party (PKK). Parts of the YBŞ eventually joined the Popular Mobilization Forces (PMF) as part of an initiative to integrate into the regular Iraqi Armed Forces; these elements were officially known as the 80th Regiment. The group was not fully interted into the security system of Iraq until late 2026.

== History ==
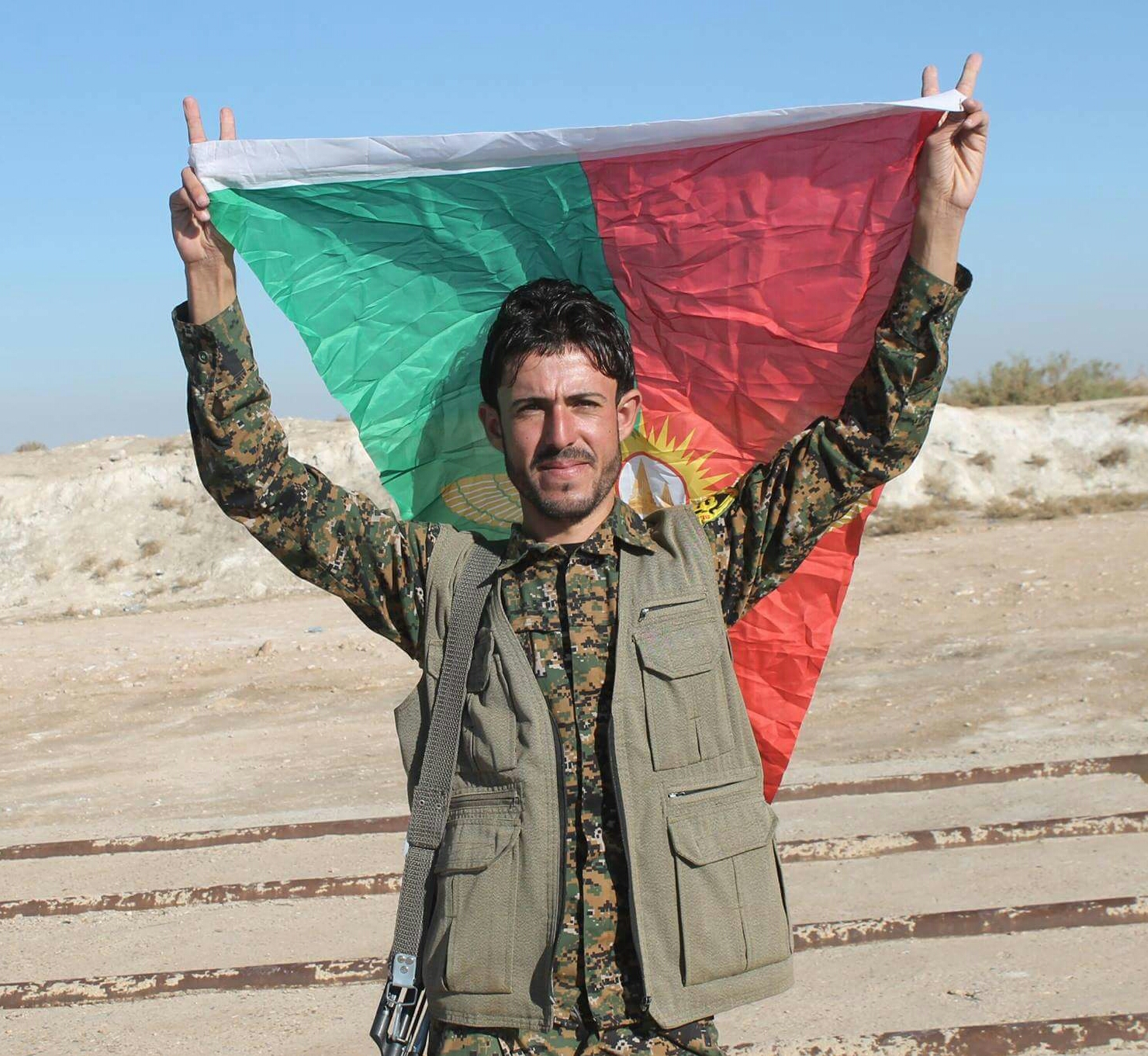
A Sinjar Resistance Units fighter carries the militia's flag

The militia was formed in Iraq in 2007 to protect Yazidis in Iraq in the wake of attacks by Sunni Islamist insurgents as the Malik Al-Tawus Troop. The Sinjar Resistance Units took part in the August 2014 Northern Iraq offensive, killing at least 22 fighters of the Islamic State and destroying five armored vehicles in the vicinity of the Sinjar Mountains.

Hundreds of Yazidis received training from People's Protection Units (YPG) instructors at the Serimli military base in Qamishli, Syria, before being sent back to the Mount Sinjar frontlines. These forces were re-branded as the "Sinjar Resistance Units".

Its commander Sheikh Khairy Khedr was killed in action during the October 2014 clashes in Sinjar.

There have been increased tensions between the YBŞ and the Kurdistan Regional Government (KRG). KRG Peshmerga forces fled Mount Sinjar when the Islamic State first attacked, leaving many Yazidis resentful and distrustful.

In October 2015, the YBŞ participated in the foundation of the Sinjar Alliance as an all-Yazidi joint commando umbrella structure. Besides their all-women offshoot, the Êzîdxan Women's Units (YJÊ), the formerly Peshmerga-aligned Protection Force of Sinjar (HPŞ) and other independent Yazidi units committed to the united Yazidi front.

Sinjar clashes (2017) of 3 March 2017 occurred between pro-PKK forces, namely the Sinjar Resistance Units (YBŞ) and the Êzîdxan Women's Units (YJÊ), and the Rojava Peshmerga that serve as the Kurdish National Council's paramilitary wing. After KNC forces entered the town of Khanasor in the Iraqi Sinjar Mountains, fighting broke out among unclear circumstances, resulting in dozens of casualties.

Under the joint command of the Sinjar Alliance, the Sinjar Resistance Units took part in the November 2015 Sinjar offensive. In 2017, KRG-aligned media outlets claimed that around 800 members had left the YBŞ, and that 400 of them had joined the Peshmerga.

In accordance with an agreement of the Iraqi government, parts of the YBŞ joined the Popular Mobilization Forces as the "80th Regiment", while transferring several positions in the Sinjar Mountains to the Iraqi Army. However, the Iraqi military demanded that the YBŞ and other local militias withdrew from further posts as of early 2021; these demands were fuelled by the Iraqi government's desire to remove the PKK's presence from the Sinjar area. The YBŞ and other groups initially refused to follow these orders, arguing that they were not affiliated with the PKK.

In September 2026, the YBŞ officially agreed to disarm and integrate into Iraqi security forces.

== See also ==
- Index of articles related to the Yezidis
- December 2014 Sinjar offensive
- List of Yazidi settlements
- List of armed groups in the Iraqi Civil War
- Genocide of Yazidis by ISIL
- Ahrar Sinjar
