= Northern Iraq offensive (August 2014) =

Military campaign

Second Northern Iraq offensive
- Part of The War in Iraq
Date	1–19 August 2014 (2 weeks and 4 days)
Location	Nineveh and Kirkuk Governorates
Result	Partial IS victory: IS besieges Yazidi refugees on Mount Sinjar after the withdrawal of Kurdish forces; IS repels Iraqi military attack on Tikrit
Territorial changes	IS captures Sinjar, the Mosul Dam, and eight other towns; Peshmerga and Iraqi special forces recapture the Mosul Dam, Mount Zartak and two towns

Belligerents
Republic of Iraq: Security forces; Shi'ite private militias; Promised Day Brigade; United States: U.S. Navy; U.S. Air Force; Kurdistan Region: Peshmerga; Assyrian Patriotic Party; Assyrian Democratic Movement; PKK: YJA-STAR; YRK; HPJ; YBŞ; Rojava: YPG; Syriac Military Council; YPJ; PDKI; Komalah	Islamic State

Commanders and leaders
Haider al-Abadi; Ali Ghaidan; Ahmed Saadi † Masoud Barzani; Jaafar Sheikh Mustafa; Mustafa Said Qadir; Qasim Shesho; Sarbast Babiri; Haydar Shesho; Murat Karayılan; Cemil Bayık; Salih Muslim; Sipan Hamo; Polat Can Gewargis Hanna; Yonadam Kanna	Abu Bakr al-Baghdadi

Strength
150,000 federal soldiers 60,000 militiamen 3,000 Iranian Quds Force; 1,000 U.S. troops 190,000 Kurdish peshmerga	20,000–31,500

Casualties and losses
1,652 killed 1,460 wounded	3,112 killed 673 wounded
- 5,000 Yazidis killed 5,000–7,000 Yazidis abducted

Between 1 and 15 August 2014, the Islamic State (IS) expanded territory in northern Iraq under their control. In the region north and west from Mosul, the Islamic State conquered Zumar, Sinjar, Wana, Mosul Dam, Qaraqosh, Tel Keppe, Batnaya and Kocho, and in the region south and east of Mosul the towns Bakhdida, Karamlish, Bartella and Makhmour

The offensive resulted in 200,000 Yazidi civilians and 100,000 Assyrians driven from their homes, 5,000 Yazidi men massacred, 5,000–7,000 Yazidi women enslaved, and a foreign military intervention against the Islamic State.

After the withdrawal of Iraqi federal forces from advancing Islamic state troops from many cities, and later the withdrawal of Kurdish Peshmerga fighters from many positions including the Qaraqosh and Sinjar, 50,000 of Sinjar's Yazidis took refuge in the adjacent Sinjar Mountains, where they lacked food, water, and other necessities. While providing help and aid to refugees, an Iraqi helicopter crashed, killing the pilot and injuring several passengers, including an Iraqi member of parliament and a photographer on assignment for TIME. 35,000 to 45,000 of them were evacuated within several weeks after the United States bombed IS positions, and the Iraqi armed forces, Kurdish People's Defence Forces, People's Protection Units, and Peshmerga forces opened a humanitarian corridor to enable their escape. Some IS-controlled territory was retaken; a subsequent Kurdish counter-attack recaptured the Mosul Dam and several other nearby towns.

== Background ==
In June 2014, Islamic State invaded and conquered significant territories in western and northern Iraq, including the cities of Mosul, Iraq's second largest town, with over a million residents, and Tikrit, 200 km south of Mosul. Iraqi federal military forces withdrew from the advancing IS troops and Kurdish Peshmerga fighters withdrew from Qaraqosh and Sinjar and later took over the control of a wide territory in northern Iraq outside the Kurdistan Region from the federal Iraqi government. A former commander of the Iraqi ground forces, Ali Ghaidan, accused former Prime Minister Nuri al-Maliki of being the one who issued the order to withdraw.

== IS assault ==
- 1 August

Friday 1 August 2014, ISIL attacked a Peshmerga post in Zumar, 40 km northwest of Mosul, in the peshmerga-controlled zone of northern Iraq, and a nearby oil-winning facility and the nearby Mosul Dam, Iraq's largest dam and an important supplier of electricity and water. The Peshmerga fought off IS, killing 100 IS fighters, according to Kurdish sources, but also losing 14 Peshmerga fighters.

- 2–3 August

Sunday 3 August, IS, with heavy weaponry seized from the Iraqi federal army, in the darkness of morning seized first the town of Zumar and then Sinjar (90 km southwest of Zumar), and the surrounding Sinjar area. IS routed from those towns the Kurdish peshmerga troops that since June more or less controlled the region. A spokesman of citizens who fled from Sinjar said, that 250 peshmerga in Sinjar had withdrawn from Sinjar in the night, leaving the civilians unprotected.

IS on 3 August also took control of the oil facility in the Zumar subdistrict. Later that day, IS also captured the town of Wana between Zumar and Mosul. There were conflicting reports about whether the Mosul Dam was still in Kurdish hands or captured by IS.

- 4 August

IS surrounded the village of Kocho near the Sinjar Mountains, demanding its Yazidi residents to convert or die.

- 6 August

IS on 6 August advanced up to 40 km southwest of Erbil, the capital of autonomous region Kurdistan Region.

- 7 August

On 7 August, IS took control of Qaraqosh (or Bakhdida), the largest Christian town of Iraq, 30 km southeast of Mosul and 60 km west of Erbil, Karamlish, 5 km from Qaraqosh, Tal Keif (Tel Keppe), Batnaya, just north of Mosul, and Bartella, just east of Mosul. Kurdish forces had retreated from Qaraqosh and surrounding area, which caused civilians to flee in panic. The Chaldaic archbishop of Kirkuk and Sulaymaniyah, Joseph Thomas, stated that "all inhabitants" of those four cities were fleeing their town.

IS also captured the strategic town of Makhmour in the Battle of Makhmour, between Mosul and Kirkuk, 20 miles from Erbil. There were conflicting remarks—in one newspaper—as to whether IS had 'seized' the Mosul Dam or was making 'efforts to seize' it. That week, IS also overran other towns in northwest Iraq, chasing Kurdish Peshmerga troops away.

At this time, the U.S. started airdropping food and water for the Yazidi refugees stranded in the Sinjar Mountains.

- 8–9 August

On 8 August, the U.S. started to conduct airstrikes on IS, first west of Erbil to stop IS's advance on the city. Starting on 9 August, airstrikes also took place around the Sinjar Mountains. By this time, IS had also seized the Mosul Dam, 40 km northwest of Mosul on the Tigris river.

== Iraqi/Kurdish/US counter-attack ==
=== U.S intervention ===
On 5 August, the United States began with directly supplying munitions to the Iraqi Kurdish Peshmerga forces and, with Iraq's agreement, the shipment of weapons to the Kurds.

Following the start of U.S. airstrikes on 8 August, between 9 and 13 August, the American air-strikes and efforts from Iraqi, Syrian and Turkish Kurds enabled the evacuation of 35,000 to 45,000 of the 50,000 Yazidis stranded in the Sinjar Mountains.

On 10 August, encouraged by American airstrikes, Kurdish Peshmerga forces retook the strategic towns of Gwer and Makhmour, both about 20 miles from Erbil. American fighter jets bombarded areas in Makhmour, forcing IS fighters to abandon their positions, and Kurdish Peshmerga together with Kurdish PKK fighters and civilian volunteers from the area reclaimed the village.

On 15 August, IS moved into the village Kocho, which they had held surrounded since 4 August, shot 80 Yazidi men dead with assault rifles, and abducted their wives and children.

=== Reclaiming the Mosul Dam ===
From 16 until 18 August, the U.S. conducted 35 airstrikes against IS positions at the strategically critical Mosul Dam. This allowed Kurdish and Iraqi forces to move swiftly and with cooperation towards Mosul Dam.

On the morning of 17 August, Kurdish forces, supported by U.S. and Iraqi airstrikes, attacked the dam. They quickly captured the eastern part of the dam, but fighting continued. By the evening, Kurdish and Iraqi forces had recaptured most of the facility, but were still in the process of removing mines and booby traps left by IS. U.S. warplanes destroyed or damaged 19 IS vehicles and one checkpoint during the battle.

On 18 August, the U.S. president confirmed Kurdish Peshmerga ground troops, with the help of Iraqi Special Forces, overran IS militants and reclaimed the Mosul Dam.

=== Iraqi move on Tikrit ===
On the morning of 19 August, Iraqi government troops and allied militiamen launched an operation to retake the city of Tikrit from IS. The military push started early in the morning from the south and southwest of the city, which lies around 160 kilometres north of the Iraqi capital Baghdad.

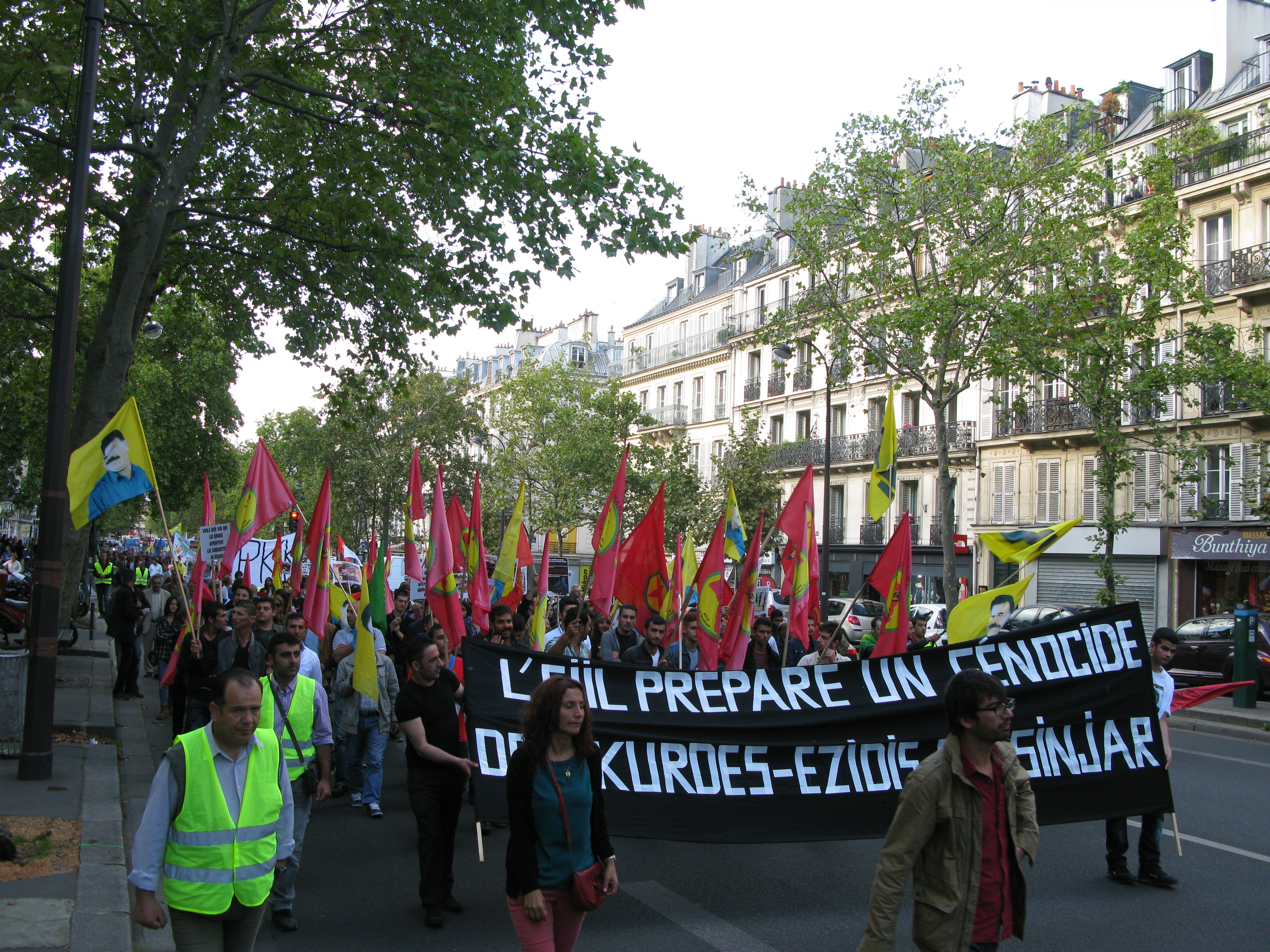
Demonstration in Paris 23 August 2014, to support Kurds and Yazidis threatened by IS

However, by the afternoon, the offensive had been repelled by IS. Also, the Iraqi military lost its positions in the southern area of the city it had captured a few weeks earlier.

== Humanitarian reaction ==
On 5 August, Iraqi military helicopters started dropping food and water for the Yazidis in the Sinjar Mountains.

On 7 August, the U.S. also started airdropping food and water for the Yazidi refugees stranded in the Sinjar Mountains.

On 10 August, the United Kingdom also began airdropping humanitarian aid in northern Iraq.

== Civilian casualties ==
The IS capture of Sinjar on 3 August was accompanied by a massacre of thousands of Yazidi men, the selling of women into slavery, and 200,000 civilians fleeing Sinjar, of whom 50,000 fled to Mount Sinjar.

IS ordered the Yazidi minority in the area to convert to Islam, pay jizyah, or face death. This prompted tens of thousands to flee their homes not only in Sinjar city but in many other villages; for example, 300 Yazidi families fled the villages of Koja, Hatimiya and Qaboshi.

The UN reported in October 2014 that IS, "sweeping" through Iraqi territory inhabited by Yazidis in August, had gunned down 5,000 Yazidi male civilians in a series of massacres and detained 5,000–7,000 Yazidi women to be sold as slaves or given to jihadists.

On 7 August, the UN reported that since 2 August 200,000 new refugees had been seeking sanctuary in the Kurdish north of Iraq from IS.

100,000 Christians, 25% of Iraq's Christianity, fled Bakhdida (Qaraqosh) and neighbouring villages and towns in the Nineveh Governorate after IS's invasion on 7 August, leaving all their property behind, many of them fleeing to Kurdistan Region. According to local officials, this August IS advance nearly purged northwestern Iraq of most of its Christian (Assyrian) population.

== See also ==
- 2012–2013 Iraqi protests
- 2014 Eastern Syria offensive
