= List of Yezidi people =

List of notable Yezidis

This is a list of notable Yezidis, including people of Yezidi descent.

== Religious, royal and historical figures ==
- Sheikh Adi ibn Musafir, Shaykh
- Sheikh Hasan, religious heir of ʿAdī ibn Sakhr
- Fexredîn, saint, religious leader, poet and philosopher
- Sakhr Abu l-Barakat, Shaykh
- Sherfedin, Shaykh
- Khurto Hajji Ismail, former Baba Sheikh
- Sheikh Ali Ilyas, current Baba Sheikh
- Hazim Tahsin Beg, prince
- Mir Hussein Beg Dasini, prince and sanjakbey
- Mir Ali Beg I of Sheikhan, prince
- Mir Ismail Chol Beg, prince
- Mir Tahsin Saied Beg, prince
- Meyan Khatun, princess
- Wansa, princess
- Ezidi Mîrza, 17th-century governor of Mosul and Yezidi leader
- Hemoyê Shero, 19th-century tribal leader
- Usuv Beg, 19th- and 20th-century leader in Armenia
- Shir Sarim, leader of an uprising against Safavid Persia during the reign of Shah Ismail I
- Mir Jafar Dasni, leader of an uprising in 838
- Jangir Agha, tribal leader and national hero

== Politicians ==
- Ali Atalan, politician
- Amin Farhan Jejo, politician and author
- Aziz Tamoyan, former president of the Yezidi National Union
- Feleknas Uca, politician and member of the European Parliament
- Isko Daseni, politician and parliamentarian
- Khdr Hajoyan, president of the Yezidi National Union and chief executive officer of the Ezdikhana newspaper
- Mahma Xelil, mayor of Sinjar, Nineveh Province, Iraq
- Murad Ismael, engineer, human rights activist, parliamentarian and politician
- Vian Dakhil, member of the Iraqi parliament

== Military figures ==
- Heydar Şeşo, founder and supreme commander of the Protection Force of Ezidkhan
- İsmail Özden, militia leader
- Khal Ali, military commander
- Khatoon Khider, military commander
- Kyaram Sloyan, soldier killed by Azerbaijani soldiers
- Mahmoud Ezidi, Peshmerga fighter
- Qasim Shesho, military commander
- Samand Siabandov, military commander, politician, writer and Hero of the Soviet Union
- Sheikh Khairy Khedr, commander and founder of the Tawûsî Melek Brigade
- Vladimir Gasoyan, civil aviation navigator and Hero of the Soviet Union

== Activists ==
- Dalal Khario, Women's Rights Award recipient and former captive of ISIL
- Farida Khalaf, former captive of ISIL
- Fawzia Amin Sido, former captive
- Haje Bakoyan, human rights activist
- Lamiya Aji Bashar, human rights activist
- Mirza Dinnayi, writer, social activist and Aurora Humanitarian Award recipient
- Nadia Murad, human rights activist and Nobel Peace Prize recipient
- Nagham Nawzat, gynaecologist and activist, International Women of Courage Award recipient
- Nareen Shammo, investigative journalist and human rights defender
- Sashik Sultanyan, human rights activist

== Writers, journalists and academics ==
- Arab Shamilov, novelist, poet and scholar
- Celîlê Celîl, historian, professor, writer and Kurdologist
- Emerîkê Serdar, journalist, writer and translator
- Emine Evdal, writer, linguist and poet
- Eskerê Boyîk, poet and writer
- Faizo Shamoyan, mathematician and professor
- Heciyê Cindî, linguist and researcher
- Jalile Jalil, historian, writer and Kurdologist
- Kerim Amoev, orientalist, economist and professor
- Khalil Rashow, academic, writer and researcher
- Khanna Omarkhali, academic, writer and researcher
- Lusia Aloeva, botanist and biologist, first female Yezidi scientist
- Marwan Omar, professor, academic and computer scientist
- Ordîxanê Celîl, writer and academic
- Pîr Xidir Silêman, writer, teacher and parliamentarian
- Qanate Kurdo, philologist, Kurdologist and professor
- Ronya Othmann, writer and journalist
- Sefik Tagay, psychologist, psychotherapist, and university professor
- Têmûrê Xelîl, journalist, writer and translator
- Tosinê Reşîd, writer, poet and playwright
- Xelîlê Çaçan Mûradov, writer and journalist

== Sports ==
=== Association football ===
- Deniz Kadah, footballer
- Deniz Undav, footballer
- Farat Toku, football manager and former footballer
- Guram Zakharovich Adzhoyev, former footballer, football executive and president of FC Arsenal Tula
- Guram Guramovich Adzhoyev, former footballer
- Ismail Atalan, football manager and former footballer
- Tuğba Tekkal, women's footballer and social entrepreneur

=== Combat sports ===
- Amar Suloev, mixed martial artist
- Badien Hasso, boxer
- Malkhas Amoyan, Greco-Roman wrestler and Olympian
- Mamuka Usubyan, boxer and kickboxer
- Mikhail Aloyan, boxer
- Roman Amoyan, Greco-Roman wrestler and Olympian
- Yurik Mamedov, boxer

=== Strength and fitness ===
- Manvel Mamoyan, fitness trainer and Guinness World Records holder

== Entertainment ==
- Guram Amaryan, comedian and showman
- Ibrahim Khalil, singer
- Kseniya Borodina (paternal side), television presenter and actress
- Merab Amzoevi, singer and songwriter
- Nawzad Shekhany, film director, producer and cinematographer
- Rubas Saido ("Enemy"), rapper and physician
- Svetlana Kasyan, soprano singer
- Zara Mgoyan, singer, actress and social activist

== Business ==
- Amirkhan Mori, owner and chairman of the Regions Group
- Mirza Sloyan, businessman and philanthropist
- Zelimkhan Mutsoev, billionaire, businessman and politician

== Crime ==
- Aslan Usoyan, Russian organized crime figure
- Zakhar Kalashov, Russian organized crime figure
- Souzan Barakat, murder victim

== See also ==
- Genocide of Yazidis by ISIL
- List of Yazidi organizations
- List of Yazidi settlements
