= Yazidis in Iraq =

Ethno-religious group in Iraq

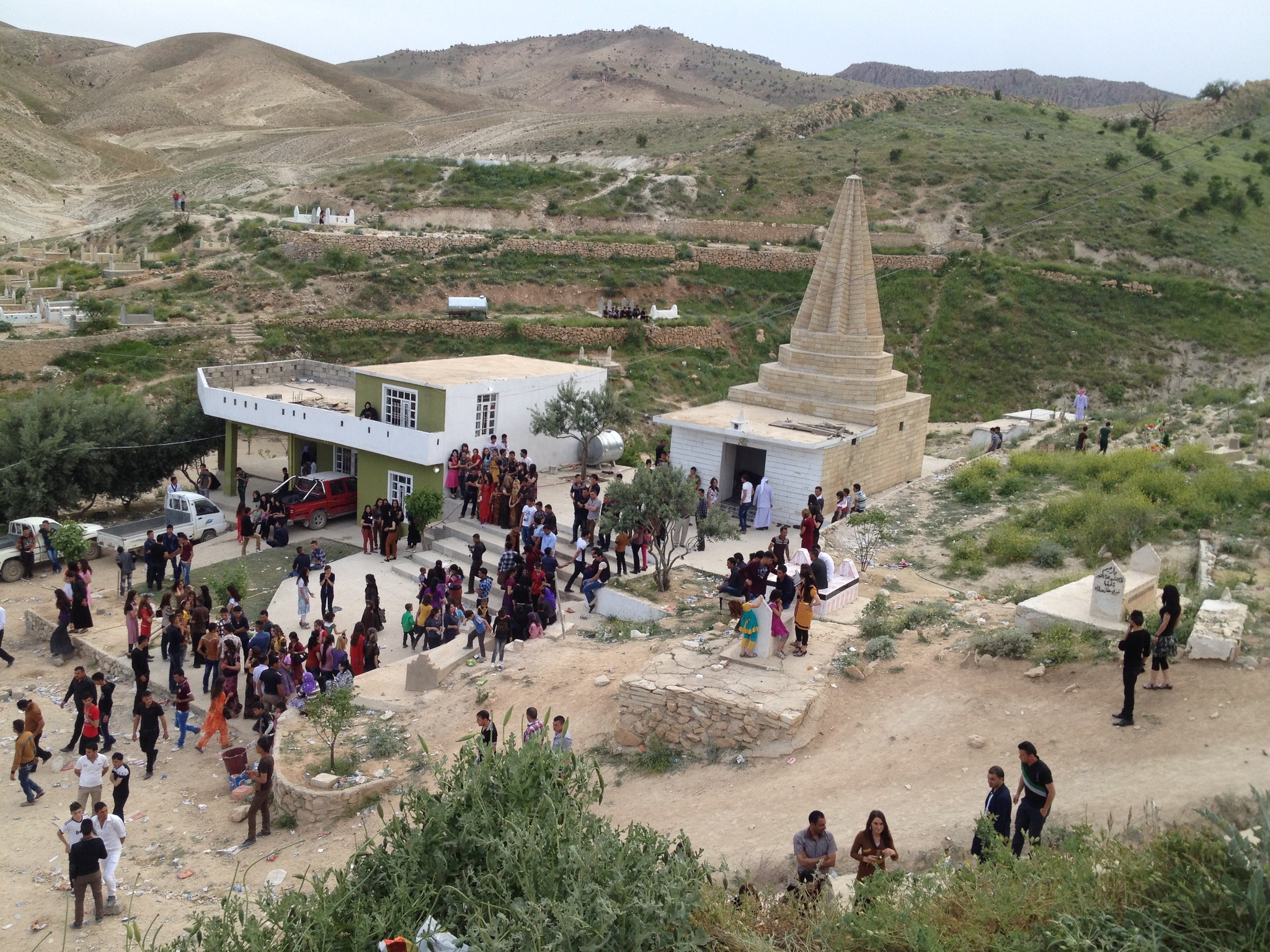
- Yazidis celebrate the Yazidi New Year in the Sinjar Mountain. The Yazidi temple of Quba Pire Ewra (Temple of the Pir of the Clouds) can be seen in the background. (April 16, 2014)

Total population
- 500,000-700,000

Regions with significant populations
- Duhok Governorate (Shekhan, Simele, Zakho), Sinjar District, Tel Kaif District, Al-Hamdaniya

Languages
- Kurmanji Kurdish, Arabic (In Bashiqa and Bahzani)

Yazidis in Iraq are adherents of Yazidism from Iraq who reside mainly in the districts of Shekhan, Simele, Zakho and Tel Kaif, in Bashiqa and Bahzani, and the areas around Sinjar mountains in Sinjar district. According to estimates, the number of Yazidis in Iraq is up to 700,000. According to the Yazda aid organization, just over half a million Yazidis lived throughout Iraq before August 2014.

== Settlement areas ==
The settlement area of the Yazidis in Iraq includes the districts of Sinjar, Tel Kaif, al-Hamdaniya and Shekhan of the Nineveh Governorate in north-western Iraq. Other Yazidi settlement areas are in the Simele district and in the Zakho district in the Duhok governorate.

== History ==
As a result of World War I and the fall of the Ottoman Empire, the territories which Yazidis lived in were divided into four nation-states which were founded on the remnants of the Turkish Empire. In 1921, the victorious Allies established the state of Iraq under British Mandate, its borders heavily influenced by Britain in line with the European nations' interests and ambitions. Faisal ibn Hussein was chosen by Britain as the first king of Iraq.

Yazidis refused to submit to King Faisal and any other Arabic state rule. They presented several reports and petitions to the British colonel in Mosul requesting that no Muslims are to be given the administrative posts in their districts and reaffirming they wanted a direct rule under Britain. John Guest reports that in the aftermath of World War I, minorities in Mosul province were invited to express their views about their destiny, about the Yazidis, the following was written:

The Yazidi declaration, signed in the name of the whole Yazidi nation in the Vilayets [Mandates] of Diyarbakr and Mosul by some 50 persons, including all the leading Yazidis, stated that they desired to be subjects of Great Britain and that they would "never agree to have an Arab Government over us.”

This stance by the Yazidis had to do with King Faisal's Muslim family background, reigniting fears of persecution at the hands of Muslims that they had faced during Ottoman rule, consequently, they preferred to live under Britain, a Christian state. In 1925, the League of Nations set up an international committee and sent it to the areas within Mosul Mandate for the purpose of resolving the Mosul issue and organising a referendum in order to poll the population of Mosul to determine whether they wanted to join Turkey or Iraq. Yazidis refused Turkish rule, and according to the results of the 1925 referendum, Yazidis in Mosul Mandate voted to join Iraq provided they would be under direct protection of the British or European Mandate.

The first Iraqi campaign against the Yazidis after the founding of the state took place in 1925 when the government of Iraq wanted to carry out the "Al-Jazeera" project, which aimed to evacuate Yazidi villages and confiscate their agricultural lands to later give them out to members of the large groups of Arab tribes, the Shammar. Their Yazidi inhabitants would then be relocated to collective towns built for them. This plan was met with stern opposition against the Iraqi government from the Yazidis, in particular from one of their tribal leaders in Sinjar, Dawud al-Dawud.

The non-Muslim minorities, especially the Yazidis, were largely prohibited from participating in state institutions, even though the Yazidis were regarded by the League of Nations as a minority like the Jews and Christians, which ensured their rights in Iraq. But in 1925, the Jews and Christians had representatives in the Constituent Assembly (Iraqi Parliament), as provided by the quotas given to them by the Iraqi government based on their population numbers. On the other hand, the population statistics regarding Yazidi numbers in Iraq were at the time inconsistent. Between 1920-1947, population estimates of Yazidis ranged from 26,000-30,000, despite this, there was no Yazidi representation in the Iraqi parliament from the founding of Iraqi Monarchy until 1947. But the government cabinets during the last decade of the monarchy, which lasted until 1958, usually had a Yazidi representative from Sinjar region.

Despite still remaining marginalized in some aspects, situation of Yazidis had still improved since Turkish rule, as they were able to enjoy some of their religious rights as ensured by the first Iraqi constitution of 1925. Article 13 of the Iraqi constitution of 1925 declared Islam as the formal religion of the state, but at the same time, it decreed that the Iraqi government had to respect non-Islamic faiths and guaranteed religious rights for the minority rights, including the right to perform religious rituals freely. Despite not being mentioned in that constitution by name, Yazidis were still acknowledged by the government as an independent religion in other laws. This recognition would later be retracted under Ba'athist government who like the Ottomans, denied Yazidism as an independent religion, claiming its origins go back to Islam. Additionally, as per the Iraqi constitution of 1925, religious minorities also had the right to manage their own religious administrative affairs and as per recommendation by the Mosul Mandate, the Yezidi Spiritual Council was formally established in 1930, still existing until today.

=== 1935 revolt ===
In 1934, universal military conscription was enacted in Iraq and in the following year, the Iraqi government tried to impose this law on Yazidis. Yazidis of Shingal demanded to be exempted from this law or at least, to be permitted to serve in a purely Yazidi unit, which was rejected by the government. This led to a revolt by a group of Yazidis in Shingal, led by Dawud al-Dawud, the chief of the Mihirkan tribe. With the fear that this revolt would extend to other Yazidi areas, the government launched a military campaign with the help of armed aircraft. The revolt was ultimately crushed by the authorities and most of the participants in the revolt were arrested or killed. Consequently, 11 Yazidi villages were destroyed, and Dawud escaped to Syria with a few of his followers.

Simultaneously, the Iraqi government was using Arab tribes and inciting them against Yazidis in order to achieve their political goals. At the start of the Second World War, Yazidi-inhabited regions, in particular the Sinjar district, were facing neglect and harassment from the Iraqi government, which was enforcing policies aimed at supporting the Arab Shammar tribes against the Yazidis of Sinjar. Large tracts of land were given to Ajeel al-Jawar, a tribal chief of the Shammar near the Sinjar mountain. As a result, Yazidis readily supported any movement which was against the Iraqi government.

In 1941, Yazidis supported the pro-German movement led by Rashid Ali al-Gaylani against the pro-British authority in Iraq. When the "National Defence Government" headed by al-Gaylani was established in April 1941, the Yazidi prince Seîd Elî Beg sent a telegram expressing his support for Gaylani's new government. Furthermore, Yazidi representatives from Mosul also went to Baghdad in order to congratulate al-Gaylani on the establishment of his government.

=== 1958 Iraqi Revolution ===
Although Yazidis enjoyed some freedoms during the monarchical period such as managing their own religious affairs, they still participated in movements or revolutions aimed at changing the ruling power in Iraq, in hopes that it would improve their situation. Yazidis who were soldiers in the Iraqi army of the monarchy, along with other soldiers, participated in the revolution of 14 July, 1958, led by Abdul Karim Qasim and his followers. After the victory of the revolution, some Yazidi soldiers became close guards of Abdul Karim Qasim in his domicile in Baghdad.

The revolution enjoyed the support of the majority among Yazidis in Sinjar, who hung banners, held demonstrations and national celebrations in favour of the revolution. On the other hand, some of the more religious Sinjari Muslims who saw the monarchy and king as a religious symbol, were unhappy with the change of the ruling power.

On August 14, 2007, the Yazidis in Iraq were victims of the 2007 Yazidi communities bombings in Sinjar, which killed 796 people.

On August 3, 2014, the Islamic State committed genocide against Yazidis during the Sinjar massacre in the Sinjar region of northern Iraq, killing an estimated 5,000 to 10,000 Yazidis and abducting another 6,000 to 7,000 Yazidis women and children.

== Flight and migration ==
Due to persecution, many Yazidis fled Iraq, including over 75,000 to Germany since 2015.

== Notable people ==
- Nadia Murad (Yazidi human rights activist and Nobel Peace Prize winner)
- Mahmoud Ezidi (Yazidi Peshmerga fighter)
- Pîr Xidir Silêman (writer, teacher and parliamentarian)
- Sheikh Ali Ilyas (current Baba Sheikh)
- Hazim Tahsin Beg (current Mir/Prince of Yazidis)
- Khurto Hajji Ismail (previous Baba Sheikh)
- Tahseen Said (previous Mir/Prince of Yazidis)
- Hemoyê Shero (nineteenth century Yezidi tribal chief)
- Haydar Shesho (founder and commander of the Êzîdxan Protection Force)
- Ezidi Mîrza (17th century governor of Mosul, Yezidi leader and hero)
- Meyan Khatun (Yazidi princess)
- Vian Dakhil (Politician)
- Mahma Xelil (Politician)

== See also ==
- Yazidism in Turkey
- Yazidis in Syria
