= Nawzad Shekhany =

Yezidi film director and producer

- نوزاد شيخاني
- Other name: Nawzad Khudur
- Citizenship: German
- Education: Art academy, Baghdad; Macromedia academy, Munich
- Occupations: Film director; film producer; cinematographer; screenwriter
- Known for: Toren (2018); The Black Massacre
- Awards: Best director, Alexandria film festival (Toren)

Nawzad Shekhany (Arabic: نوزاد شيخاني; official name Nawzad Khudur) is a German-Yezidi film director, producer and cinematographer from Shekhan in northern Iraq. His feature film Toren (2018) follows a Yezidi family across three generations, and his documentary The Black Massacre deals with the Yezidi genocide carried out by the Islamic State in 2014. Toren won awards at the Hollywood International Moving Pictures Film Festival and at the Alexandria film festival, where Shekhany received the best director award. He has also served on festival juries.

== Early life and background ==
Shekhany is from Shekhan. Shekhany is his professional name, his personal name being Nawzad Khudur.

His father, Abu Azad, is a researcher and historian of Yezidism. Since 1954 the family has built up a photograph and video archive on Yezidi religion and festivals, largely through the father's work, and this archive is held by Shekhan Film. His father was also a physician who, from the late 1950s into the 1960s, served as personal doctor to the family of Mustafa Barzani in the Barzan area. He photographed the family, including Masoud Barzani and Idris Barzani, as well as local residents and their customs. On journeys through Yezidi areas including Sinjar, Bashiqa, Bahzani and Shekhan, the father recorded religious ceremonies, popular festivals and traditional dress, first with a still camera and later on film and video. Shekhany has said that his father's written analyses connected the origins of these rites with those of ancient Mesopotamian civilisations.

=== Yezidi identity ===
In a 2014 interview with ÊzîdîPress, Shekhany said he is proud to be Yezidi. He said that being Yezidi means believing in God, living in peace with others, opposing racism and religious intolerance, and defending the religion and history of the Yezidis. He described the central message of Toren as addressed to Yezidis who have left or converted away from the religion, urging them to return to their families, community and faith.

In a 2025 interview with Kurdistan24, Shekhany said the debate over whether Yezidis should be called Yezidi or Kurdish is not part of his artistic concerns, and that he avoids the terms "Kurdish Yezidi" and "Kurdish Muslim". He holds that the Yezidis are indigenous to Mesopotamia and that many Kurds had Yezidi roots in earlier centuries.

=== Training in Iraq ===
As a primary-school pupil, Shekhany acted alongside established actors in a graduation project by students of the Institute of Fine Arts, filmed between Shekhan and Lalish. This was his first contact with cameras and film crews. He later joined the Iraqi Artists Syndicate, attended training courses and youth-centre programmes, and in Baghdad met the director Faisal al-Yasiri, whose seminars and courses gave him early experience in directing. In the 1980s he and his younger brother founded an art production office in Shekhan, and the brothers worked with their father on documenting ceremonies at Lalish.

From 1983 to 1987 he studied engineering at a university in Erbil. In 1991 he enrolled at the art academy in Baghdad, and while a student he worked as a filmmaker for Baghdad International TV. In 1996–1997 he founded his own studio in Iraqi Kurdistan.

== Career ==
=== Germany ===
Shekhany left Iraq for Germany in 1997, citing the political situation and successive wars. In Munich he chose to study film rather than civil engineering and enrolled at the Macromedia academy; his graduation project was filmed in Tunisia. He then worked at several German studios, including RTL, and founded independent studios in more than one German city. In 2005 he was part of a delegation of Kurdish filmmakers at the Cannes Film Festival.

=== Shekhan Film ===
With his brother Sherzad Shekhany, he established the production company Shekhan Film, which ÊzîdîPress described as the first Yezidi film production company. Shekhany has said that he financed Toren from his own funds through the company, that it was the company's first film, and that Shekhan Film intends to produce further films on Yezidi religion and tradition.

=== The Black Massacre ===
The Islamic State's attack on Sinjar began on 3 August 2014. Shekhany resigned from his positions in Germany, including his work at Studio Europe and his role as a cameraman accompanying Masoud Barzani on foreign visits, and travelled to areas near Sinjar. He has said that he documented the destruction by drone, that he was the first to fly a drone over Sinjar while it was held by the Islamic State, and that the aircraft came under fire throughout.

He assembled footage from dozens of television channels and photographers and from the mobile phones of survivors, and used it to produce The Black Massacre (Arabic: الفرمان الأسود), a documentary about the genocide. An-Nahar interviewed him while the film was being prepared for release and described him as the founder of the Association of Kurdish Filmmakers. Shekhany has said that the International Criminal Court in The Hague accepted the film as an official archival document on the genocide.

=== Toren ===
Before the 2014 Yezidi genocide, Shekhany was working on a feature film, Toren, about the repeated genocides of the Yezidis and their effect on the sense of belonging of later generations. Filming began in 2013 in Georgia and Iraq. After the attack he rewrote the script to connect the story to the new events while keeping its main storyline. The film took four years to make. Dubbed in Arabic and subtitled in English, it is based on true events and portrays a man struggling with his identity against the background of the persecution of the Yezidi minority.

The film follows a Yezidi family across three generations that took refuge in Georgia. Toren, the grandson, is a painter born in Georgia who struggles with illness and with his identity. He meets Eka, a Georgian doctor, and begins to look for his roots. The family eventually decides to return to its ancestral land in Iraq.

By May 2018 Toren had won the best foreign long film award and the best cinematography award at the Hollywood International Moving Pictures Film Festival. At the 35th Alexandria Mediterranean Countries Film Festival in 2019, Shekhany won the best director award for Toren in the Nour El-Sherif competition for Arabic feature films. Kurdistan24 also reports that the film won the best film award at a festival in Rio de Janeiro and a grand prize at a festival in Morocco, and that it was shown at dozens of international festivals between 2018 and 2024.

A planned theatrical release in Germany through the Dome cinema chain was prevented when cinemas closed for two years during the COVID-19 pandemic. Between 2022 and 2025 Shekhany re-edited the film and issued a new version, Toren: Back to Roots. The new version premiered at the ASTOR Grand Cinema in Hannover, in Arabic with German subtitles.

=== Evlin ===
Shekhany is developing a feature film about Yezidi women enslaved by the Islamic State, titled Evlin (Arabic subtitle: رقصة الخلاص, "dance of salvation"). The film draws on more than 150 interviews he conducted with survivors from Sinjar, along with written and audio material. The script is complete, and the project was presented at the film market of the Cannes Film Festival in 2025. Shekhany has said that Evlin is not one girl but a symbol of every abducted Yezidi woman and of women elsewhere who suffer oppression and rape.

=== Juries and teaching ===
By February 2014 Shekhany had been chosen to chair the jury of the Al Waha film festival in Morocco. He has since served as jury president or member at other international festivals, and has given workshops and master classes in directing, filmmaking and writing funding applications for young filmmakers in the Middle East and Europe.

== Personal life ==
Shekhany holds German citizenship and speaks Kurmanji, Arabic, German and English.

== See also ==
- List of Yezidi people
- Yezidism in Iraq
