= Khal Ali =

Iraqi Yezidi paramilitary commander

- خال علي
- Born: Ali Serhan Eissa
- Military career
- Allegiance: Iraq
- Branch: Popular Mobilization Forces
- Service years: 2014–present
- Commands: Lalish Brigade
- Conflicts: Sinjar massacre (2014); Northern Iraq offensive (August 2014); Western Nineveh offensive (2017); 2017 Iraqi–Kurdish conflict

Ali Serhan Eissa (Arabic: علي سرحان عيسى), known as Khal Ali (Arabic: خال علي; Kurmanji Kurdish: Xal Elî), is a Yezidi commander in Iraq's Popular Mobilization Forces (PMF). He formed the Lalish Regiment, a Yezidi unit named after the temple of Lalish, and commands it in the Sinjar region. He began fighting the Islamic State in 2014 with about 40 local men and joined the PMF with this group in early 2016. When Iraqi forces took over the Sinjar district from the Peshmerga in October 2017, Kurdish forces handed Sinjar city to his regiment without a fight.

== Early life ==
Ali is a Yezidi from Khanasor in the Sinjar region. He is a survivor of the 2014 Yezidi genocide and his father, Walati, was killed by the Islamic State in Khanasor on 3 August 2014, and his body is in one of the town's mass graves.

"Khal" is a nickname that translates to "Uncle".

== Military career ==
=== Islamic State attack ===
The Islamic State attacked Sinjar in August 2014, an assault the United Nations later classified as genocide against the Yezidis. Ali was not a soldier, but he took up a weapon to defend his family, his land and his community, and about 40 other local Yezidi men joined him. The group had no name and fought the Islamic State independently for about a year and a half before looking for a larger force to join. Ali considered the Peshmerga, the Kurdistan Workers' Party (PKK) and the Iraqi army, and chose the PMF, which he described as the "enemy of Daesh", officially becoming a part of the PMF in early 2016.

The first PMF force created for Yezidis was the Lalish Battalion, founded by Ali. At first, it could not reach Sinjar to fight the Islamic State because Yezidi PMF units were not allowed to pass through the Kurdistan Region. Human Rights Watch dates the formation of the Lalish Brigades, as well as that of the separate Ezidkhan Brigades, to early 2017.

=== Lalish Brigade ===
The unit is named after the Yezidi temple at Lalish. It is referred to as the Lalish Battalion, Brigade or Regiment. Shafaq News described it as a regiment of the PMF's 53rd Brigade deployed in Yezidi areas, while the Al Jazeera Centre for Studies described it in 2019 as a unit of the Imam Ali Brigades, also called the "Hussein Brigade", with more than 3,000 fighters based in Sinjar town and some villages south of the district.

The PMF began operations south of Mount Sinjar on 12 May 2017. Former Peshmerga, including Naif Jasso of Kocho, left their units and joined the Yezidi PMF, and a second battalion, the Kocho Battalion, was created alongside the Lalish Battalion. By 29 May the PMF liberated the remaining large Yezidi towns south of the mountain, ending the Islamic State presence in the Sinjar region. Yezidi recruits were trained at a camp near Tel Qasab and organised into battalions intended to defend Sinjar.

=== Iraqi takeover of Sinjar ===
After the September 2017 Kurdish independence referendum, Iraqi forces and the PMF entered Sinjar. Kurdish forces handed the district to the Lalish Brigades without a fight. Speaking to Reuters that December, he called Sinjar "a city of ghosts". Nearly fifty mass graves had been found outside the town since 2014.

In October 2018 there were three local Yezidi PMF units in Sinjar, and the Lalish Brigade was one of the groups competing with the Peshmerga and the PKK-affiliated YBŞ for influence in the district.

=== Sinjar Agreement ===
In October 2020, Baghdad and the Kurdistan Regional Government signed an agreement on Sinjar. It gave the federal government responsibility for security, moved the PMF, Peshmerga and other armed groups to the outskirts of the district, called for an end to the PKK's presence, and provided for 2,500 new local security recruits. Ali called the agreement a coup against the PMF. He questioned why Hamid al-Shatri, an undersecretary at Iraq's National Security Agency who Ali said had helped form a PMF brigade, had signed it.

Yezidi PMF factions rejected the return of KDP-led Peshmerga forces to Sinjar. Ali said they would not allow Sinjar to be sold a second time and rejected KDP control over the Yezidis' fate. He said the KDP had withdrawn its forces, roughly 12,000 fighters, from Sinjar in 2014 without firing on the Islamic State.

In December 2020, after the Iraqi Army deployed to Sinjar for the first time since 2003, Ali told the Associated Press that the PMF would stay in Sinjar permanently and that "we are kings over the heads of the security forces in Sinjar". The agreement had called for the PMF to leave the city; at the time they were securing its outskirts. When the YBŞ withdrew from the city centre, Ali told KirkukNow that many of its fighters were already in the PMF's tribal mobilisation and that more were being added to the PMF's 80th Regiment.

=== 2021 deployment ===
In February 2021, three more PMF brigades, estimated at combined 9,000 to 10,000 fighters, were sent to Sinjar after Turkey threatened an operation against the PKK in the area. Ali said Baghdad had told the PMF days earlier to prepare to repel a Turkish attack. He said Turkey intended to attack Sinjar and bring Peshmerga forces with it, which he called unacceptable, and said the PMF had about 12,000 members in Sinjar before the three brigades arrived. He also said about 200 YBŞ members had joined the PMF.

Ali said the three brigades withdrew in June 2021 and were redeployed to other Iraqi cities because the claims that had prompted the deployment proved unfounded after several months. About 2,000 PMF fighters remained in Sinjar.

=== 2022 clashes between the army and the YBŞ ===
After the Iraqi army and the Sinjar Resistance Units (YBŞ) clashed in April and May 2022, Khal Ali told Rudaw that the fighting began as a misunderstanding between the PMF and the army over whether to leave a site, that both sides were responsible, and that it "should have never reached that level". He said the YBŞ's affiliation with the PKK harmed the group and that it should abandon the ideology. Shafaq News reported that he objected to the army sharing headquarters with the YBŞ in Khanasor and Gohbal and called on Yezidis to expel the army and the PMF's 80th Brigade from Sinuni and Dukri. Rojnews, which is close to the PKK movement, reported him saying that army intervention in Sinjar was an insult to Yezidis and that the YBŞ was an official force in Iraq.

After the YBŞ left Sinjar town in a deal with the army, he said many YBŞ fighters had already served in the tribal PMF since the liberation of Sinjar and that more were being added to its 80th Regiment.

=== 2026 ===
In February 2026, after the Syrian army reached the border of the Sinjar district, Ali told Rudaw that residents were ready to cooperate with the security forces and defend the area, and that the Yezidis remembered what had happened to them ten years earlier. He said he did not welcome the Syrian army as a neighbour, but that it had become one against the Yezidis' wishes. In March 2026, during a wave of attacks on PMF positions in Iraq after the start of the Israeli–American conflict with Iran, he told KirkukNow that PMF positions in Sinjar had not changed.

== Positions and public statements ==
Khal Ali has argued that Yezidis should protect themselves. In 2018 he told the European Council on Foreign Relations that the Americans "handed us over" to the KDP after 2003, that the Iraqi state has not treated Yezidis as first-class citizens since then, and that the Kurds "sell us every few years". He said Yezidis were a "political football" between Baghdad and Erbil and wanted to protect themselves because the central government and the Kurds had failed to do so in the past.

After the October 2020 Sinjar agreement between Baghdad and the Kurdistan Regional Government, he told Al Jazeera Net that the Yezidi factions in the PMF would not allow Sinjar to be sold a second time, and that Yezidis would not accept being subjects of any party. He rejected the return of KDP Peshmerga forces and said the KDP had withdrawn about 12,000 fighters from Sinjar in 2014 without firing a shot against Islamic State. The agreement called for the PMF to leave the city. In December 2020 he told the Associated Press, "The (PMF) will stay forever, we are kings over the heads of the security forces in Sinjar."

In a documentary released by Yazda, he said the Iraqi government had been unable to provide security and stability for Yezidis and that he would therefore remain armed to protect Yezidi identity, people and territory.

== See also ==
- List of Yezidi people
- Qasim Shesho
- Haydar Shesho
- Sheikh Khairy Khedr
- Khatoon Khider
- Yezidism in Iraq
