= Sefik Tagay =

Yezidi psychologist and psychotherapist in Germany

Prof. Dr. Sefik Tagay
- Şefîk Tagay
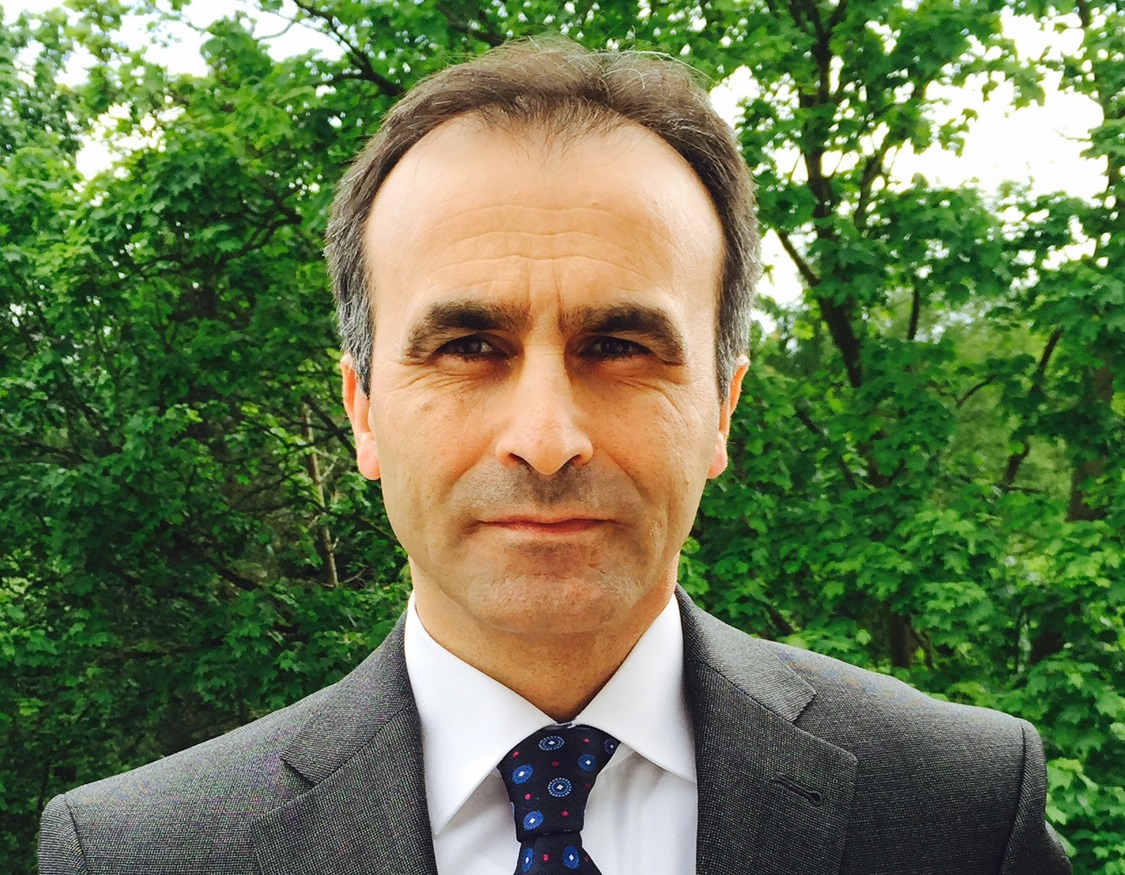
- Born: 1972; Taxari, Siirt Province, Turkey

Academic background
- Education: Ruhr University Bochum (Dipl.-Psych.); University of Duisburg-Essen (Dr. rer. medic., habilitation)
- Thesis: Traumatische Ereignisse, Posttraumatische Belastungsstörung und Somatisierung bei Patienten der Ambulanz einer Psychosomatischen Universitätsklinik (2005)

Academic work
- Discipline: Psychology
- Institutions: Cologne University of Applied Sciences; LVR-Klinikum Essen
- Notable ideas: Essen Trauma Inventory

Sefik Tagay (Kurmanji Kurdish: Şefîk Tagay; born 1972) is a German-Yezidi psychologist, psychotherapist and university professor. He is professor of psychology with a focus on public health at Cologne University of Applied Sciences.

From 2007 to 2019 he headed the research department of the Clinic for Psychosomatic Medicine and Psychotherapy at the LVR-Klinikum Essen, a teaching hospital of the University of Duisburg-Essen. He is the main author of the Essen Trauma Inventory (ETI) and of several related diagnostic questionnaires, and has published on trauma, eating disorders and psychological resources. Born into a Yezidi family in Turkey, he came to Germany as a child. He has researched Yezidi identity and the mental health of the Yezidi diaspora, and was the first chairman of the Gesellschaft Ezidischer AkademikerInnen (Society of Yezidi Academics) from 2012 to 2016.

== Early life and education ==
Tagay was born in 1972 in the village of Taxari in Siirt Province, Turkey. He was born into a Yezidi family and moved to Germany in 1981, at the age of nine. His mother tongue is Kurmanji.

He completed his Abitur in Bochum in 1993 and studied psychology at Ruhr University Bochum until 1999, supported from 1994 by a scholarship from the Friedrich Ebert Foundation. His diploma thesis compared religious orientation, work motivation and social desirability in ten Christian groups. He received his doctorate (Dr. rer. medic., magna cum laude) from the medical faculty of the University of Duisburg-Essen in March 2005, with a thesis on traumatic events, posttraumatic stress disorder and somatisation among outpatients of a psychosomatic university clinic. In November 2012 he completed his habilitation and received the venia legendi in psychotherapy at the same faculty. His habilitation thesis dealt with structured, standardised assessment of traumatisation and personal resources in psychotherapy.

== Career ==
After his diploma Tagay worked in adult education in Bochum and, in the first half of 2000, as a research associate in the psychology faculty of the Technical University of Munich. From August 2000 to August 2001 he worked in child and family counselling for the city of Essen. He began training as a psychological psychotherapist at the Kölner Lehrinstitut für Verhaltenstherapie in 2000.

From November 2000 he was a research associate at the Clinic for Psychosomatic Medicine and Psychotherapy at the LVR-Klinikum Essen. He treated outpatients and inpatients as a psychotherapist in Mönchengladbach and Essen from 2002, and led the clinic's research department from March 2007 until August 2019.

On 1 September 2019 he became professor of psychology with a focus on public health at TH Köln. He belongs to the university's Faculty of Applied Social Sciences and the Institute for Gender Studies, and is a member of its senate. By June 2021 he had been the first supervisor of 38 completed doctoral theses.

On the occasion of the 60th anniversary of the German-Turkish recruitment agreement, around 30 people of Turkish origin were invited to a discussion event at Bellevue Palace with Federal President Frank-Walter Steinmeier on September 10, 2021, Sefik Tagay was among them as a representative of science.

== Research ==
His research areas are psychotraumatology, eating disorders, psychological resources and migration research. He has also published on posttraumatic stress in hemodialysis patients and quality of life in thyroid cancer patients.

=== Diagnostic instruments ===
Tagay and his colleagues at Essen developed a group of questionnaires in German known as the Essen inventories. The Essen Trauma Inventory (Essener Trauma-Inventar, ETI), a screening instrument for traumatic events and posttraumatic disorders, was published in 2007. A manual for the ETI, written with Wolfgang Senf, was published by Hogrefe in 2014. A version for children and adolescents (ETI-KJ) appeared in 2011, and the ETI was validated in a sample of German Armed Forces soldiers in 2010.

The ETI is intended to identify traumatic events and to assess posttraumatic stress disorder (PTSD) and acute stress disorder in adults. Besides the long form, it has two short forms, a trauma list of 18 items and a symptom scale of 23 items. The symptom items are grouped into four subscales: intrusion, avoidance, hyperarousal and dissociation. The long form is available in Arabic, Chinese, English, French, Italian, Kurdish, Dutch, Persian, Polish, Russian, Serbo-Croatian, Spanish, Turkish and Belarusian versions. The publisher reports internal consistency of α = .82 to .87 for the scales in a total sample of 952 people.

Tagay co-developed the following instruments:

- 2004: Essen Trauma Inventory (ETI)
- 2007: Essen Trauma Inventory for Children and Adolescents (ETI-KJ)
- 2007: Eating Disorders Quality of Life (EDQOL)
- 2007: Essen Quality of Life Index for Eating Disorders (ELI)
- 2008: Essen Resources Inventory (ERI)
- 2009: Essen Resources Inventory for Children and Adolescents (ERI-KJ)
- 2012: Essen Self-Esteem Inventory for Children and Adolescents (ESI-KJ)
- 2013: Essen Migration Inventory (EMI)
- 2013: Yezidi Identity Inventory (EZI)
- 2013: Essen Collectivism–Individualism Inventory (EKI)
- 2014: Essen Quality of Life Index for Eating Disorders in Children and Adolescents (ELI-KJ)
- 2014: Essen Distress Inventory (EBI)
- 2015: Essen Transidentity Quality of Life Inventory (ETLI)
- 2016: Essen Partnership Pain Inventory (EPSI)
- 2016: Essen Resilience Inventory for Unaccompanied Minor Refugees (ERI-UMF)
- 2018: Essen Gratitude Inventory (EDI)
- 2020: Cologne COVID-19 Pandemic Inventory (KCPI)
- 2020: Cologne Adjustment and Distress Inventory (KABI)
- 2021: Tagay Self-Protection Inventory (TSI)
- 2021: Tagay Satisfaction Inventory (TZI)

=== Later work ===
During the COVID-19 pandemic Tagay published results of the Cologne COVID-19 Pandemic Study, and he is also an author of a 2022 paper on physical and psychological complaints among social work students during the pandemic. He writes the Psychology Today blog Restoring the Equilibrium.

== Yezidi studies and activities ==
Tagay's research on Yezidis began alongside his clinical work, and he increasingly studied Yezidi identity.

=== Gesellschaft Ezidischer AkademikerInnen ===
On 17 November 2012, about 30 Yezidi academics and students from across Germany founded the Gesellschaft Ezidischer AkademikerInnen (GEA) in Essen, and elected Tagay as its chairman. He held the post until 2016, when Serhat Ortaç succeeded him. It eventually reached about one hundred members and was considered the largest Yezidi academic association in the world. In October 2014 Tagay opened the association's second international conference in the New Town Hall in Bielefeld, which more than 500 people attended. In the 2026–2027 term he is first deputy chairman of the GEA.

=== Yezidi Identity Inventory ===
With an international group of researchers, Tagay developed the Yezidi Identity Inventory (Ezidisches Identitäts-Inventar, EZI), a questionnaire of 50 items that was available in seven languages by 2015. The evaluation presented in his 2016 book covered 383 respondents.

=== Die Eziden und das Ezidentum ===
In 2016 the Hamburg State Centre for Political Education published Die Eziden und das Ezidentum: Geschichte und Gegenwart einer vom Untergang bedrohten Religion, a 215-page book by Tagay and Serhat Ortaç. A review in socialnet called it the most substantial publication on Yezidis in Germany known to the reviewer, while criticising its limited engagement with migration and identity theory. In 2019 Tagay and Katharina Brizic contributed a chapter on Yezidi history to a volume on the care of Yezidi women and girls brought from Iraq to Baden-Württemberg.

=== Genocide and the diaspora ===
Tagay treated Yezidis in his practice between 2014 and 2019, including refugees from the Sinjar region and Yezidis who had lived in Germany for decades. In a 2017 study in The Lancet with Dogan Ayhan, Claudia Catani, Ulrich Schnyder and Martin Teufel, he examined psychological distress among Yazidis in Germany after the Islamic State attack of 3 August 2014. Of 512 participants, 25.8 percent screened positive for probable posttraumatic stress disorder, 39.3 percent reported clinically relevant anxiety and 18.9 percent reported clinically relevant depression. Probable PTSD was more common among women, and people who had not been in Sinjar also showed elevated distress.

== Awards and recognition ==
Tagay won the Förderpreis of the German-Speaking Society for Psychotraumatology (DeGPT). The magazine Focus Gesundheit listed him among Germany's leading physicians (Ärzteliste) in 2012 and 2013.

== Selected works ==
- Tagay, S.; Herpertz, S.; Langkafel, M.; Senf, W. (2005). "Posttraumatic stress disorder in a psychosomatic outpatient clinic: gender effects, psychosocial functioning, sense of coherence, and service utilization". Journal of Psychosomatic Research. 58 (5): 439–446. doi:10.1016/j.jpsychores.2004.09.007. PMID 16026660.
- Tagay, S.; Kribben, A.; Hohenstein, A.; Mewes, R.; Senf, W. (2007). "Posttraumatic stress disorder in hemodialysis patients". American Journal of Kidney Diseases. 50 (4): 594–601. doi:10.1053/j.ajkd.2007.06.018. PMID 17900459.
- Tagay, S.; Erim, Y.; Stoelk, B.; Möllering, A.; Mewes, R.; Senf, W. (2007). "Das Essener Trauma-Inventar (ETI)". Zeitschrift für Psychotraumatologie, Psychotherapiewissenschaft, Psychologische Medizin (in German). 1: 75–89.
- Tagay, S.; Senf, W. (2014). Das Essener Trauma-Inventar (ETI): Eine Verfahrensfamilie zur Identifikation von traumatischen Ereignissen und Traumafolgestörungen (in German). Hogrefe.
- Tagay, S.; Schlottbohm, E.; Reyes-Rodriguez, M. L.; Repic, N.; Senf, W. (2014). "Eating disorders, trauma, PTSD, and psychosocial resources". Eating Disorders. 22 (1): 33–49. doi:10.1080/10640266.2014.857517. PMC 3966425. PMID 24365526.
- Tagay, S.; Schlottbohm, E.; Lindner, M. (2016). Posttraumatische Belastungsstörung (in German). Kohlhammer.
- Tagay, S.; Ortaç, S. (2016). Die Eziden und das Ezidentum: Geschichte und Gegenwart einer vom Untergang bedrohten Religion (in German). Landeszentrale für politische Bildung Hamburg. ISBN 978-3-946246-03-9.
- Tagay, S.; Ayhan, D.; Catani, C.; Schnyder, U.; Teufel, M. (2017). "The 2014 Yazidi genocide and its effect on Yazidi diaspora". The Lancet. 390 (10106): 1946. doi:10.1016/S0140-6736(17)32701-0. PMID 29115224.
- Tagay, S.; Breidenstein, A.; Friederich, H.-C.; Rübben, H.; Teufel, M.; Heß, J. (2018). "Entwicklung und Validierung des Essener Transidentität Lebensqualitäts-Inventar (ETLI)". Zeitschrift für Sexualforschung (in German). 31 (1): 5–26. doi:10.1055/s-0044-101502.

== See also ==
- List of Yezidi people
