= Khatoon Khider =

Iraqi Yezidi singer and Peshmerga officer

- Xatûn Xidir
- Born: Mount Sinjar, Iraq
- Occupations: Singer, military officer
- Military career
- Branch: Peshmerga
- Rank: Captain
- Commands: Livaya Keçên Roj (Sun Force)
- Conflicts: November 2015 Sinjar offensive

Khatoon Khider (Kurmanji Kurdish: Xatûn Xidir; Arabic: خاتون خضر), also known as Xatê Şingalî, is an Iraqi Yezidi folk singer and Peshmerga officer who commands an all-female Yezidi unit of the Kurdistan Region's forces. The unit is known in Kurdish as Livaya Keçên Roj. In English it is called the Sun Force, the Force of the Sun Ladies, the Sun Brigade and the Daughters of the Sun.

Before 2014 she was a well-known singer of Yezidi folk songs, and she is reported to have been the first Yezidi woman to perform Yezidi music in public. After the Islamic State took Sinjar in August 2014, she was trapped for about ten days on Mount Sinjar. She then stopped performing and asked Peshmerga commanders to let Yezidi women train as fighters. The Kurdistan Regional Government gave formal permission on 15 January 2015. Reports give the unit's size as anywhere from 123 to 1,700 women. Khider has said she will not sing in public again until the Yezidis are free.

== Early life and Yezidi background ==
Khider was born on Mount Sinjar, where her family of shepherds and musicians camped on the high summer pastures for several months each year. Her chin and cheeks carry small traditional dark-blue tattoos distinctive to her home region.

Khider has said that Yezidis have lived with a sense of siege for as long as anyone can remember, that her father and grandfather also lived through wars, and that Yezidis speak of 73 massacres, with governments repeatedly coming to Sinjar because it lies between Iraq and Syria. She has also said that Arab neighbors in Sinjar did not accept Yezidis building homes near them or owning land. Her father and grandfather were soldiers, and her brother serves in the Peshmerga.

Her father, Sheikh Ali Shamsi, was conscripted for the Iran–Iraq War a few months after she was born and was captured soon afterward. She did not see him for about ten years. She has said that her grandfather and mother wept for him throughout her childhood, and that this pushed her to put the sadness into song. Khider left school after the sixth grade and worked as a day laborer on local farms, because sanctions on Saddam Hussein's government had raised food prices, the family needed money, and her town had no high school.

== Music career ==
While working in the fields she asked her brother-in-law to find her a tanbur and taught herself to play it. She sang the ballads of her childhood for relatives and did not expect anyone outside the family to hear them. A cousin who saw a commercial opportunity secretly recorded her singing for the family. The recording was released on a CD that sold nearly 4,000 copies, a high figure for the area. The attention embarrassed her and she feared it would bring shame, until her father told her he supported her singing.

In 2004 she was invited to the region's largest town to sing at a Yezidi celebration attended by the community's leaders. It was her first performance before a crowd. A dignitary on the stage later told her he had been moved partly because she was the first Yezidi woman to perform Yezidi music in public. She has compared the decision to become a singer to going to the front line. The song that made her famous tells the story of Adule, a woman who dressed as a man to enlist and recruited other women to serve in secret so that she could reach the front where her lover was. When they finally met, the strain of the separation had left him ill, and he died in her arms. According to The Guardian, Khider wondered even then whether she might one day have to go to war herself.

== Attack on Sinjar ==
Islamic State fighters took Sinjar in the summer of 2014, killing an estimated 5,000 Yezidi men and boys and enslaving thousands of women and girls. The United Nations called the attacks genocide. Khider was in Sinjar when they arrived, and the Peshmerga stationed there withdrew. She fled with neighbors up Mount Sinjar, a mountain sacred to Yezidis, and the United States began air strikes and airdrops in August. More than 50,000 people took refuge on the mountain. Khider was there for ten or eleven days with her parents, three sisters and brother, and the group ran out of food and water by the second day. The Yezidis were eventually evacuated from the mountain.

Islamic State fighters destroyed her home and both of her tanburs and burned her photographs. Khider has said that Arab neighbors who stayed behind led the fighters to the house because she was a singer. An aunt was taken captive, a disabled uncle was killed in his bed, and another uncle died on the front line. She has also said that Arab residents of a neighboring town assured Yezidis they were in no danger before the attack, and that she regards this as a betrayal.

== Sun Force ==
=== Formation ===
After the evacuation, Khider was determined to return and fight, and she began lobbying the Peshmerga for weapons and Baba Sheikh, the senior Yezidi religious leader, for his blessing. Her father supported her. Baba Sheikh warned that it was dangerous for a woman and that she could be captured, and she answered that Islamic State had already taken women from Kocho, Sinjar and elsewhere. He gave his approval. She had no experience with weapons or combat. She has said that her father warned her of the danger and that she told him she was prepared to sacrifice herself for the honor of her family and people.

A Peshmerga general agreed to help and, after he consulted Masoud Barzani, the president of the Kurdistan Region, the request was approved. Kurdistan24 reports that the unit was set up with the support of Barzani and the Ministry of Peshmerga. Khider told the American Foreign Policy Council that she joined the Peshmerga and formed the unit on 18 November 2014, and that after a little more than two months of training she became its commander on 15 January 2015.

The members considered two names for the unit, one using the word Êzidî and the other Keçên Roj, and chose Roj because they are the daughters of the day the disaster struck Sinjar. A local television station broadcast her appeal for volunteers, and more than 1,700 women responded. She has said she asked displaced Yezidi women in the camps who would join her to defend their honor, but that her call was addressed to all women, not only Yezidis. She has also said that the unit does not admit Arabs, only women from Yezidi and Kurdish backgrounds.

By August 2015 she had recruited 123 women aged 17 to 30 with Barzani's permission and her deputy was Adiba Sido, aged 24. A Peshmerga colonel said the Peshmerga had given the volunteers weapons and special equipment and that an American-German team had trained them. CNN visited the unit in October 2015, while it was in basic training, and reported that she had recruited more than 100 women.

Khider has described the unit as a model for other women in the region and has said she wants others to learn to take up weapons and protect themselves. She has said she fears that Yezidi boys kidnapped from Mount Sinjar and indoctrinated by the group may end up fighting Yezidi women. She has said that Islamic State fighters believe they cannot enter paradise if a woman kills them. She has told the American Foreign Policy Council that she wanted her photograph published so that the Islamic State could see her in uniform. In 2017 she told a Kurdish newspaper that she became a soldier because the group sold girls in markets and raped children, and that Yezidi women would not allow it to happen again.

=== Composition and training ===
The Sun Force is described as the only all-female, all-Yezidi unit in the Peshmerga. Its members come from Sinjar and the surrounding area. Some survived Islamic State slavery, and others joined because of friends and relatives who were captured. Khider speaks to each recruit and her family about military life before she signs up, and according to Khider no family has stopped a recruit from joining. Most recruits had never held a gun and had been students, teachers and cooks.

Reports of the unit's size differ. Fox News reported in February 2016 that 123 women had completed training and about 500 more were waiting. In May 2016 Khider told The Telegraph the unit had 1,000 members, and the American Foreign Policy Council counted 126 in June 2016 and 123 in February 2017. The Telegraph reported 160 in November 2016, Khider told The World in January 2017 that she had 1,700, and the Guardian reported nearly 200 the following month.

Training took place at a Peshmerga base near Dohuk. The women received about two months of instruction on Kalashnikov rifles and mortars, and the Peshmerga also taught them how to respond to a chemical attack. Khider is one of three instructors at the base, with two male captains, one Muslim and one Christian. Recruits are held to the same standards as male Peshmerga, must be at least 18, and need their family's permission. The unit completed its first basic infantry course on 26 June 2016. The base commander said that more than 600 women were waiting to join but that funding from Baghdad did not allow the Peshmerga to train them, and that Peshmerga of both sexes were owed four months of pay. Members wake at 6 a.m., exercise, drill with weapons and clean them, and take guard shifts alongside men.

=== Operations ===
On 13 November 2015 the unit supported the Peshmerga in the November 2015 Sinjar offensive. The women took part in direct combat and helped clear streets and buildings rigged with explosives. Khider has said she manned a heavy machine gun near Sinjar's cement factory during the fighting, under fire from mortars and suicide attackers on motorbikes. She has said she killed a number of Islamic State fighters and that captured fighters are dealt with according to the law.

Critics have described the unit as more propaganda than fighting force. They point out that its base was more than an hour's drive from the front line and that, as of February 2017, it had lost no one in combat. Khider said she and her fighters were frustrated at the lack of movement on the Sinjar front and thought they should take part in the Mosul fight. Khider has said that the United Nations estimated 3,500 Yezidi women and girls were still held in Islamic State territory, and that the unit could not go home to their families until they were freed.

By early 2017 the unit was deployed in Sinuni, a town at the foot of Mount Sinjar. Its 123 members worked ten-day rotations, with 20 to 40 on base at any time, and patrolled the area and manned checkpoints. It belongs to the Sinjar Regiment, which has about 8,000 men and women, and Khider reports to the regimental commander, Qasim Shesho. In August 2017 Khider said that 2,000 Yezidi women had applied to join the Peshmerga and that their names had been passed to the relevant offices, with recruitment to begin once they were approved.

== Personal life ==
Khider's younger sister Aliya joined the unit, and a second sister has also enlisted. In 2016 and 2017 Khider was living in a temporary home in Dohuk during breaks from duty. She has said she swore not to sing again after the Islamic State began killing Yezidis. In January 2017, after several requests, she sang a Yezidi folk song for a reporter. It addresses a bird and warns it not to nest in a tree that can be destroyed at any time, and the reporter read it as a reference to the Yezidis and their home in Sinjar.

== In media ==
Khider narrates The Sun Ladies, a 2018 virtual reality documentary directed by Celine Tricart that was an official selection at the Sundance Film Festival.

== See also ==
- List of Yezidi people
- Yezidis in Iraq
