= Kerim Amoev =

Georgian orientalist and scholar of Yezidi and Kurdish studies

- Керим Амоев
- Born: 1939 (age 86–87); Artashar, Armenia

Academic background
- Alma mater: Tbilisi State University
- Thesis: The Economic Situation of Iranian Kurdistan (1945–1963) (1973)

Academic work
- Discipline: Kurdish studies, Iranian studies, economics
- Institutions: Tbilisi Institute of Asia and Africa; Free University of Tbilisi; Ilia State University

Kerim Amoev (Russian: Керим Амоев; Georgian: ქერიმ ამოევი) is a Georgian-Yezidi orientalist and economist focusing on the history, economy and religion of the Kurds and Yezidis. He was born in Armenia in 1939 and raised in Tbilisi. After a career in Soviet Georgian economic planning bodies he was vice-rector of the Tbilisi Institute of Asia and Africa and later headed degree programmes at the Free University of Tbilisi. He is a professor emeritus and works with the Department of Yezidi Studies at Ilia State University.

Amoev belongs to the first generation of Yezidi scholars in Georgia, with Lamara Pashaeva and Kerim Ankosi, and since Pashaeva's death in 2015 he has been the oldest active academic working on Yezidi subjects. He has published more than eighty scholarly works, among them books in Russian and Georgian on Kurdish economics and history, a 1999 edition of two disputed Yezidi texts, and, with Dimitri Pirbari, a 2013 booklet on the Yezidi alphabet, which the two authors modernised. He edited the Yezidi monthly New View from 2011 to 2013.

== Early life ==
Amoev was born in the village of Artashar in Armenia in 1939, the son of Alkhan Amoev and Base Amoeva. His mother died when he was three or four years old. In 1945 his father moved the family from the Oktemberyan district near Yerevan, in Armavir Province, to Tbilisi, where labourers were needed. Amoev grew up there with his sisters.

Amoev is a Yezidi of the murid caste and belongs to the Mandaki tribe. His father was thirteen when the family fled Van in the Ottoman Empire, and they reached the South Caucasus by way of Kars. The settlements of Chupuhlu and Valijan were the settlements of his ancestors and tribe. His great-grandfather was already living in Van, and Amoev does not know whether the family had come there from Sheikhan or from Sinjar. His great-grandfather Jangir Agha fought alongside the Armenian commander Andranik Ozanian against the Ottomans and is regarded as a national hero of the Yezidis.

During the Soviet period Amoev was an atheist, although he heard his father pray every morning and evening. He now describes himself as a believer who does not want to change his faith or have his children change theirs, and he turns toward the sun when he prays, seeing in it a representation of the most high. He is one of many Yezidis who declared themselves atheists under Soviet rule and returned to their ancestral faith in old age. He observes Yezidi new year at home with his family and visits the cemetery with relatives that day, and his wife prepares food in memory of the dead.

== Career ==
Amoev graduated from the Faculty of Oriental Studies at Tbilisi State University and defended a thesis on the Sharafnama of Bidlisi as a primary source for the history of the Kurds. From 1965 to 1968 he was a postgraduate student at the Institute of Near and Middle East of the Azerbaijan Academy of Sciences in Baku, where he specialised in the economy of Iran. After returning to Tbilisi in 1969 he worked at the Institute of Information of the Academy of Sciences, and from 1970 to 1973 at the Central Statistical Office. In 1973 he defended a dissertation on the economic situation of Iranian Kurdistan between 1945 and 1963, and from 1973 to 1993 he worked at the Institute of Economics and Planning of the National Economy. At that institute, which was under the State Planning Committee of the Georgian SSR, he was specialist, senior specialist and head of its section for education, science and scientific services. He also headed a section at the Institute of the National Economy attached to the Central Committee of the Communist Party of Georgia.

From 1994 to 2008 he worked at the Tbilisi Institute of Asia and Africa, first as head of its educational department and then as vice-rector. A 2008 report by the sinologist Peter Kupfer lists him as vice-rector and dean of the Faculty of International Relations and History of the Orient, under rector Guram Chikovani. From 2009 he headed the master's and doctoral programmes of the Institute of Asia and Africa at the Free University of Tbilisi. He was also for many years the editor of scholarly orientalist journals and has been president of the International Center of Kurdish Studies.

Amoev has said that while he worked at the Central Statistical Office the recorded number of Yezidis in Georgia was fixed at 33,000 on the instruction of the Soviet authorities, although the figures first compiled had been about 70,000. He also said that the population of Rustavi, 99,000, was reported as 100,000 so that the city would qualify for the privileges attached to that size.

=== Yezidi studies in Georgia ===
Amoev headed the Centre for Yezidi Studies in Tbilisi until the International Yezidi Theological Academy was established in 2018. In 2019 the Department of Yezidi Studies was founded at the Giorgi Tsereteli Institute of Oriental Studies of Ilia State University, described by Rodziewicz as the first academic institution in the world dedicated to research on Yezidism. Amoev has taken part in its work from the start. He is a member of the editorial board of the International Journal of Yezidi Studies, whose first issue appeared in 2024.

Amoev has been a long-standing member of the Union of Yezidis of Georgia. In 1991 he contributed a historical article, "Kurds: Pages of History", to the first issue of Ronai, the newspaper of the Kurdish Association "Ronai". The House of the Yezidis of Georgia (Mala Êzdiyed Gurcistanê), founded in 2011 by Agit Mirzoev and Pir Dima, had Amoev as chairman of its Scientific Council.

The House revived the monthly New View (Russian: Новый взгляд; Kurmanji: Nêrîna Nû), with Amoev as editor-in-chief. Twelve A3 issues appeared between 2011 and 2013 in print runs of 500 to 1,000 copies distributed free, financed by the Swiss embassy in Georgia and the Canadian embassy in Turkey. Pir Dima, Agit Mirzoev and Lili Safarova sat on the editorial team, and the Russian Academy of Sciences Kurdologist Nodar Mossaki contributed. Most articles were in Russian, with one page in Kurmanji, and the monthly ceased in 2013 when funding ended. In his editorial to the first issue Amoev wrote that Yezidi children hardly speak, read or write their native language and know little of their history, customs and religion, called this a growing and dangerous trend that would speed assimilation, and urged families to speak the mother tongue at home.

On 21 October 2011 Amoev was among the Yezidis who met at Tbilisi airport a delegation of Yezidi clergy from Iraq led by Mir Tahsin Beg, the first such visit to Georgia. In the editorial of the October 2011 issue of New View he wrote that the visit fulfilled the long wait of earlier generations.

Amoev estimates that about three thousand Georgian Yezidis have converted to Christianity. In 2016 he named care for religion and raising the level of education and culture as the main tasks for the diaspora, and said that if current trends continued little of the Yezidi community would remain in fifty years. He added that building the planned religious and cultural center in Tbilisi was only the first step, since it would also have to be made to function.

== Yezidi alphabet and holy books ==
In 2013 the Spiritual Council of the Yezidis in Georgia decided to use the Yezidi script, known from Anastase Marie's 1911 publication of two manuscripts, for religious content. The Iranist Amoev and the Arabist Pir Dima (Dimitri Pirbari) modernised it, adding eleven letters so that it matched the phonetics of the Yezidi language (Êzdîkî). Their book Yezidi Script (Russian: Езидская письменность, Tbilisi, 2013) describes each letter and its phonetic value. The authors wrote that, whatever the obscure origins of the script, its uniqueness matters to them because it can serve as one element of Yezidi self-awareness. The script is used by clergy at the Yezidi temple in Tbilisi, on wall stelae with excerpts from hymns, in documents of the Spiritual Council, and in the 2018 prayer book Dua'yêd Êzdiyan. It has since been added to the Unicode Standard.

Amoev dated the script's origin to the 17th–18th centuries in his 1999 book, while noting that other scholars place it in the 13th–14th centuries. In a 2016 interview he said the Yezidi alphabet is a purely Yezidi one, distinct from Kurdish, and is listed among the world's alphabets in the surveys of Diringer, Istrin and Loukotka. He added that the Kurdish alphabet was created on a Latin basis together with Yezidis in the USSR, and that Soviet Yezidi scholars such as Kanat Kurdoev, Ivan Farizov and Zara Yusupova raised the cultural level of the Kurds.

Amoev's 1999 book Yezidi Holy Books presents Georgian and Russian translations of the Book of Revelation (Kitêba Cilwe) and the Black Book (Mashafa Resh), with critical commentary. It was published in Tbilisi and went through two editions. The Yezidi clergy do not regard the two texts as authentic. In 2018 the Spiritual Council of the Yezidis in Georgia issued a statement rejecting them as forgeries and holding that only the sacred qewls and beyts are authoritative. The statement was a reaction to the 2016 republication of Amoev's edition. Amoev disagrees with the council. He does not regard the books as forgeries, although he allows that some passages may be falsified, and he says their content agrees with the qewls. As a historian he treats them as an important written record showing that the Yezidis produced sacred books in the 10th to 12th centuries. He reads the Black Book as stating that the Yezidis lived in Babylon and that the Sasanian kings Shapur I and Shapur II were Yezidis.

== Views on Yezidi identity and origins ==
=== Ethnic identity ===
In Soviet Georgia Yezidis were entered as "Yezidi" in the nationality column of their passports, while censuses usually recorded them as Kurds practising Yezidism. The first edition of the Great Soviet Encyclopaedia described them as a separate nationality related to the Kurds, and its later editions as part of the Kurds. Georgian Yezidis were formally allowed to give their nationality as Yezidi, and not only as Kurdish, in 2013, after a letter from the Spiritual Council of the Yezidis in Georgia to the Central Statistical Office. The community's own scholars took part in this debate. Pashaeva, Amoev and Ankosi regarded the Yezidis as Kurds until the 2000s, and the titles of their publications referred to Kurds. Rodziewicz links this to Soviet propaganda, which praised the Kurdish rather than the Yezidi shepherd, and to the fact that most of the first generation came from murid families receptive to communist internationalism. Instead of writing about the Yezidi religion they studied the Kurdish economy and folk material culture.

Amoev and Pirbari both later said openly that their earlier identification of the Yezidis as Kurds had been a mistake and the result of following the academic authorities of the Soviet era. In 2014 Pirbari and the historian Rustam Rzgoyan published the article On the Question of the Identity of the Yezidis, which argued that the Yezidis are neither Kurds nor a sub-ethnos of the Kurds, that the ethnogenesis of Kurds and Yezidis ran in parallel among Kurmanji-speaking tribes, and that Yezidis forcibly or voluntarily converted to Islam later took part in the formation of the Kurds. Amoev publicly defended the article in a piece published on the website ÊzîdîPress on 8 March 2014. He wrote that the questions of ethnogenesis and identity still needed further research, discussed the census returns in which Georgian residents declared themselves Yezidis, including people who did not follow the Yezidi religion, and concluded that people choose their own identity.

Asked whether the Yezidis, who in his opinion are not Kurds, speak Kurdish, Yezidi or Kurmanji, Amoev called it the wrong question and asked in return how many nations speak English, since not everyone who does is English. He said that in the Soviet Union, a tightly closed state, Yezidis were given the name Kurds and everyone was counted as Kurdish. He holds that Kurmanji and Yezidi are one language, spoken by Yezidis in the former USSR and Armenia and Georgia, in the Ottoman Empire from which his family came, and in Turkey, Syria and northern Iraq. The language spoken by the Yezidis does not differ grammatically from Kurmanji but has notable lexical differences, and Yezidis call it "Yezidi" because only members of the community fully understand its religious vocabulary and idioms.

=== Yezidi origins ===
In a 2016 interview Amoev said that many peoples are present in the ethnogenesis of the Yezidis, the Medes among them. He said that he could state only as a hypothesis that the last of the tribes closest to the Yezidis were the Quraysh tribes, but that the Yezidis already spoke Kurmanji in the seventh century. He pointed to shared features, such as that Yezidi women and Arab women of the Quraysh tribes did not cover their faces, lived together with men and managed their own property. Amoev also said that some tribes found among both Yezidis and Kurds, such as the Rojkî, Rûzakî, Sîpkî and Dûmbûlî, are Yezidi tribes, of which some accepted Islam and some kept their beliefs. He summed up his view as being that the Yezidis are not Kurds but that some of the Yezidis became Kurds. He opposes joining the Yezidis and Kurds by force. In the Soviet Union Yezidis were counted as Kurds. He has also cited the conduct of Kurdistan Regional Government forces during the 2014 attack on Sinjar as an argument against treating the Yezidis as Kurds.

Amoev regards Yezidism and Zoroastrianism as separate religions with shared elements such as the sacredness of fire and water, argues that Yezidism does not hold belief in a personification of evil, and considers Mithraism much closer to Yezidism, though he says whether the Yezidis were once Mithraists still needs research. He holds that Yezidis existed before Sheikh Adi, that the institution of the pir is older than that of the sheikh, and that Sheikh Adi was a wandering dervish of Umayyad descent and not a Muslim. On the name of the Yezidis, he links it to the Old Persian word for God (yazdan), to the caliph Yazid I, and to the city of Yazd. He cites a Yezidi prayer that names Sultan Ezid, Tawusi Melek and Sheikh Adi as one, and says all three can be regarded as a deity. He regards Sultan Ezid as the forefather of the Yezidis.

== Selected works ==
- Ezidebis ts'minda ts'ignebi / Езидские священные книги [Yezidi holy books]. Tbilisi, 1999. In Georgian and Russian.
- With Tsatsa Kotetishvili (eds.): Zargotina Kurmanca û Gurca / Образцы курдско-езидского и грузинского фольклора [Samples of Kurdish-Yezidi and Georgian folklore]. Tbilisi, 2001. A bilingual Kurmanji–Georgian book with Georgian translations of extracts from five epics (Mem û Zîn, Demdem, Zembîlfiroş, Şêx Mîrza, Cangîr Axa) and twenty-four tales.
- Курдский вопрос в международных договорах [The Kurdish question in international treaties]. 2007.
- Курды: история, экономика [Kurds: history, economy]. Tbilisi, 2008.
- With Dimitri Pirbari: Езидская письменность [Yezidi script]. Tbilisi: Nekeri, 2013.
- With Nodar Mossaki: Курды и езиды в переписях населения Российской империи, СССР и стран постсоветского пространства [Kurds and Yezidis in the censuses of the Russian Empire, the USSR and the post-Soviet countries]. Moscow, 2014.
- Езиды и их религия [The Yezidis and their religion]. Tbilisi, 2016.

== See also ==
- List of Yezidi people
- Yezidism in Georgia

== Sources ==
- Rodziewicz, Artur (2026). The Yezidis of the South Caucasus: Their Past and Present in Georgia. Iran and the Caucasus Monographs. Vol. 8. Leiden: Brill. doi:10.1163/9789004761766. ISBN 978-90-04-76177-3.
- Rodziewicz, Artur (2018a). "Jezydzka diaspora w Gruzji i jej intelektualiści" [The Yezidi diaspora in Georgia and its intellectuals] (PDF). Fritillaria Kurdica: Bulletin of Kurdish Studies (in Polish) (19–20): 13–30. ISSN 2353-4052.
- Rodziewicz, Artur (2018b). "W słońcu widzę odzwierciedlenie tego, co najwyższe: Rozmowa z Kerimem Amojewem" [In the sun I see the image of what is the highest: Interview with Kerim Amoev] (PDF). Interview conducted in Tbilisi, 27 January 2016. Fritillaria Kurdica: Bulletin of Kurdish Studies (in Polish) (19–20): 31–48. ISSN 2353-4052.
- Rodziewicz, Artur (2022). "Between Orthopraxy and Orthodoxy: International Yezidi Theological Academy in Tbilisi". Kulturní studia. 18 (1): 81–116. doi:10.7160/KS.2022.180104.
- Kupfer, Peter (2008). Projekt Wein- und Seidenstraße: Forschungs-Kurzbericht, Mai – September 2008 (PDF) (Report) (in German). Germersheim: Johannes Gutenberg-Universität Mainz.
- Karaca, Erdal; Pirbari, Dimitri; Rovenchak, Andrij (2018). "Preliminary proposal for encoding the Yezidi script in the SMP of the UCS" (PDF). Unicode Consortium. L2/18-238.
- Rovenchak, Andrij; Pirbari, Dimitri; Karaca, Erdal (n.d.). "Yezidi Alphabet: The Way to Unicode". Free University Journal of Asian Studies.
- National Parliamentary Library of Georgia (1999). "ეზიდების წმინდა წიგნები: "ქეთება ჯელვა", "მასჰაფა რაშ"" [Holy Books of the Yezidis: "Ketebah Jelva", "Mashafa Rash"]. Digital Repository (in Georgian).
