= Guram Amaryan =

Russian stand-up comedian (born 1993)

- Гурам Амарян
- Born: Guram Nugzarovich Amaryan; 9 August 1993 (age 33); Tbilisi, Georgia
- Education: Lobachevsky University
- Occupations: Stand-up comedian, television presenter, producer
- Years active: 2014–present
- Spouse: Eka Mstoyan (m. 2025)
- Website: guramamaryan.ru

Guram Amaryan (Russian: Гурам Амарян; born 9 August 1993) is a Russian stand-up comedian and showman of Yezidi descent, born in Tbilisi, Georgia, who works in Russia. He won the Ukrainian television show Rassmeshi komika, reached the final of the first season of Open Mic on TNT in 2017, and became a regular performer on TNT's Stand Up. He is a host of the YouTube show Reshaly and a producer and host of Po khatam.

His material deals with his Yezidi origin, his family and its traditions, and life in Russia as a young man from the East.

== Early life ==
Amaryan was born in Tbilisi to a Yezidi family. His ancestors fled Turkey for Armenia, and his grandfather later settled in Tbilisi. The Yezidi language was spoken at home, and his parents were religious.

His father was a professional drummer who worked for long periods in Russia. In 2001 the family moved to Novosibirsk, and about a year later they settled in Nizhny Novgorod, where Amaryan grew up. The family of five lived in a 21-square-metre apartment, and his father worked as a seller at the Kanavinsky market, where Amaryan helped him in his final school years.

Amaryan has said that at about fifteen he realised he liked being on stage, and that he was captain of his school's KVN team in the tenth and eleventh grades. After school he expected to work in the tax service. He considered applying to a theatre institute, but entered the finance faculty of Lobachevsky University, where he continued to play KVN and trained as a tax specialist. In a 2024 podcast interview in Armenian he repeated that he had been preparing to become a tax collector.

== Career ==
=== Early work ===
To support himself he worked as a shop assistant, a merchandiser, a sales-floor employee at Auchan and, for the longest period, as a courier. Producers of the Ukrainian show Rassmeshi komika (Make the Comedian Laugh) noticed him at a KVN game in Minsk, and he won the programme. He spent the prize money on his first car.

He entered TNT's Comedy Battle as part of a duo, "Sofya-Alyoshka" (Софья-Алёшка), with a friend, Gayane. The duo was eliminated in the second stage. Amaryan has said that after his partner moved abroad he began performing stand-up. His first stand-up performance was at a themed evening in Nizhny Novgorod in 2014. He then became a resident of the Stand Up club in Nizhny Novgorod and worked as an event host.

=== Television and online shows ===
In 2017 Amaryan took part in the first season of Open Mic on TNT. He was placed on Ruslan Bely's team and reached the final. He then became a resident performer on Stand Up and has appeared on TNT4's Prozharka.

In July 2021 he was a guest on the YouTube show Chto bylo dalshe? (What Happened Next?). The episode, which had about 22 million views, was removed from the channel, and Amaryan has said he asked the producers to delete it. In 2023 he began appearing with Pavel Dedishchev, Artyom Vinokur and Rasul Chabdarov on Reshaly, a show in which the comedians try to solve problems brought by the audience. He produces and hosts Po khatam with other comedians. In autumn 2023 he became host of the quiz show Narod protiv zvyozd (The People vs. the Stars) on VK Video.

In an episode of Sessiya, a VK Video programme hosted by Dmitry Dibrov, he spoke about being bullied as a child and about his panic attacks. In 2026 the betting company Melbet announced him as a brand ambassador.

=== Solo shows ===
His first large solo show, A chto lyudi skazhut? (А что люди скажут?, "What Will People Say?"), was released in 2023. His father, a drummer, opened the performance.

His second show, Gost (Guest), is about a young man who left his homeland more than twenty years earlier in search of success. He toured it in Russia and abroad, including a concert at the Karen Demirchyan Sports and Concerts Complex in Yerevan in February 2024, dates in Uzbekistan in 2024 and in Berlin, Frankfurt and Cologne in February 2025. A closed premiere was held at the Illuzion cinema in Moscow on 19 March 2025, and the show was released on VK Video the next day. In it he jokes that he still feels like a guest in Russia. He has also performed the show in Tbilisi, at the Vakhtang Salaridze Concert Hall.

His third show, Bazar, which deals with marriage, family and everyday conflicts, toured Russian cities in 2026. In a May 2026 television interview he said he gave more than 80 tours a year after his wedding.

== Personal life ==
=== Yezidi identity ===
In 2015, ÊzîdîPress described him as the most successful Yezidi in comedy, and Russian media have since called him the first Yezidi stand-up comedian. In the 2015 interview he said it was hard to joke in the Yezidi language and that jokes he translated into it did not sound like jokes, and he expressed a wish to stage the first stand-up concert in his native language. He has said that one of his reasons for going into comedy was to speak about his people. He has also said that for many years he felt like a guest in Russia, that a very small share of Yezidis dislike his work, and that most of the response he hears is positive. He has said that Yezidis have no separate country of their own and that his ancestors were not from Iraqi Kurdistan but from Turkey.

In April 2023 he travelled to Iraqi Kurdistan and visited Lalish, the main Yezidi temple. He called it the holiest place for him and the bastion of Yezidism, and said it was the first time he had been in a place where everyone around him was Yezidi and spoke his native language. He has said that after he arrived in New York, United States customs officers held him for about 40 minutes of questioning. They asked about women's rights in the Middle East and the purpose of his visit, and asked him to tell some jokes from his act. He linked the stop to his trip to Iraq, which he had made on a pilgrimage to the main Yezidi shrine.

In the 2015 interview Amaryan said that he shared the view of Yezidis who oppose marriage outside the community, and that he wanted his wife to be Yezidi. Amaryan became engaged to Eka Mstoyan, then a 21-year-old Yezidi student at the Russian Presidential Academy of National Economy and Public Administration, in May 2025, and the two married in Moscow on 16 August 2025. About 500 guests attended, including comedians and performers, and traditional Yazidi dances were performed. On social media Amaryan said that Yezidi customs were followed: he threw an apple at the bride as a symbol of purity, was given a pillow as a sign of a long marriage, and was given a tree as a symbol of security in marriage. Mstoyan was born in Moscow. The two families had known each other for years. When Amaryan was eight, he attended the wedding of her parents, where his father played music.

== See also ==
- List of Yazidi people
