= Badien Hasso =

Yazidi Kurdish professional boxer

Personal information
- Nicknames: Bad Man; The Kurdish Lion
- Nationality: Iraqi Kurdish
- Born: Badien Edris Hasso; August 24, 1994 (age 32) Shekhan, Duhok Governorate, Iraq
- Height: 183 cm (6 ft 0 in)
- Weight: Light heavyweight

Boxing career
- Stance: Orthodox

Boxing record
- Total fights: 23
- Wins: 23
- Win by KO: 12
- Losses: 0
- Draws: 0

Badien Edris Hasso (Kurdish: Badîn Îdrîs Heso Zozanî; also transliterated Badin Haso or Badien "Bad Man" Hasso; born 24 August 1994) is a Yazidi Kurdish professional boxer from Shekhan, Iraqi Kurdistan, fighting out of Henderson, Nevada, United States. As of July 2026 he holds the WBC International Light Heavyweight title and is undefeated as a professional with a record of 23 wins and 0 losses. He is known in Kurdish media by the nickname "the Kurdish Lion" for carrying the flag of Kurdistan into the ring during his fights.

== Early life ==
Hasso was born in Shekhan, in the Duhok Governorate of Iraqi Kurdistan, on 24 August 1994, one of eight children, growing up with three brothers and four sisters. His father is a member of the Kurdistan Democratic Party (KDP) and, according to Hasso's official biography, later became one of the political leaders of the Sinjar (Shingal) region. To escape the government of Saddam Hussein, Hasso's family fled Iraq and settled in Oberhausen, Germany, where Hasso grew up and began boxing at age nine.

While based in Germany, Hasso represented the country internationally as an amateur, twice finishing as runner-up at the German Amateur Championships, and compiled an amateur record of 68 wins, 5 losses, and 1 draw before turning professional in 2014 at age 19.

Hasso has said that, while living in Germany, he helped in the creation of the Yezidi Women's Peshmerga Unit (an all-women militia formed in Iraq in 2015 to help protect the Yazidi community following the 2014 Yazidi genocide), and that his parents were later able to return to Iraq, where his father took on a leadership role in the Sinjar region.

On signing with Star Boxing, Hasso said he looked forward to "taking the middleweight division by storm and showing the world what we Kurds are all about."

== Professional career ==
Hasso turned professional in 2014 and built his early career fighting in Germany, Mexico, and the United States. He later partnered with trainer Dwight Yarde and began training out of Henderson, Nevada, signing with Star Boxing (led by Joe DeGuardia).

Fighting at light heavyweight, Hasso remained undefeated through his early professional career. On 23 November 2025, he defeated Uzbek boxer Sherzod Khusanov by unanimous decision. In December 2025, Hasso — described in Kurdish media coverage as representing the Kurdistan Region, won first place at a WBC Asia-affiliated continental boxing event held in Albania, after which he was received by Kurdistan Regional Government Prime Minister Masrour Barzani, who congratulated him and reaffirmed KRG support for Kurdish athletes.

=== WBC International Light Heavyweight champion ===
On 23 May 2026, in a bout for the vacant WBC International light heavyweight title at Willy-Jürissen-Halle in Oberhausen, Germany, promoted by Ahmet Öner's Arena Box Promotion, Hasso stopped previously unbeaten Mexican boxer Víctor Vicente Correa Ramos, knocking him out with a body-shot-capped combination. The result improved his professional record to 23–0.

Hasso made the first defense of his WBC International title on 17 July 2026 against German southpaw David Kerkmann at "The Address" in Mülheim an der Ruhr, Germany, again on an Ahmet Öner-promoted card. Hasso dropped Kerkmann with a right hand 57 seconds into the second round; after Kerkmann beat the count but appeared unable to continue, the referee stopped the contest, awarding Hasso a technical knockout victory and retaining his title. Kurdistan Region General Director of Sports Sardar Ismail attended the bout ringside. Following the win, Hasso, who was born in the Kurdistan Region of Iraq, spoke about wanting to be officially recognized as representing Kurdistan rather than Iraq in his boxing career, and Ismail stated that plans were underway to stage a future title defense for Hasso in Kurdistan itself.

== Boxing style and identity ==
Hasso boxes as an orthodox light heavyweight standing 6 ft 0 in (183 cm). He has publicly emphasized his Yazidi and Kurdish identity throughout his career, including in his stated wish to represent the Kurdistan Region rather than Iraq in official capacities, and has been described in Kurdish media as a source of national pride for the Kurdistan Region. He is known by the nickname "the Kurdish Lion" and is noted for carrying the Kurdistan flag into the ring during his fights.

== Professional boxing record ==
As of July 2026, Hasso holds a professional record of 23 wins and 0 losses, including wins by knockout or technical knockout.

== See also ==
- Yazidis
- Kurdistan Region
- Sinjar
- Yazidi genocide
