= Manvel Mamoyan =

Armenian-Yezidi athlete and Guinness World Record holder (born 1993)

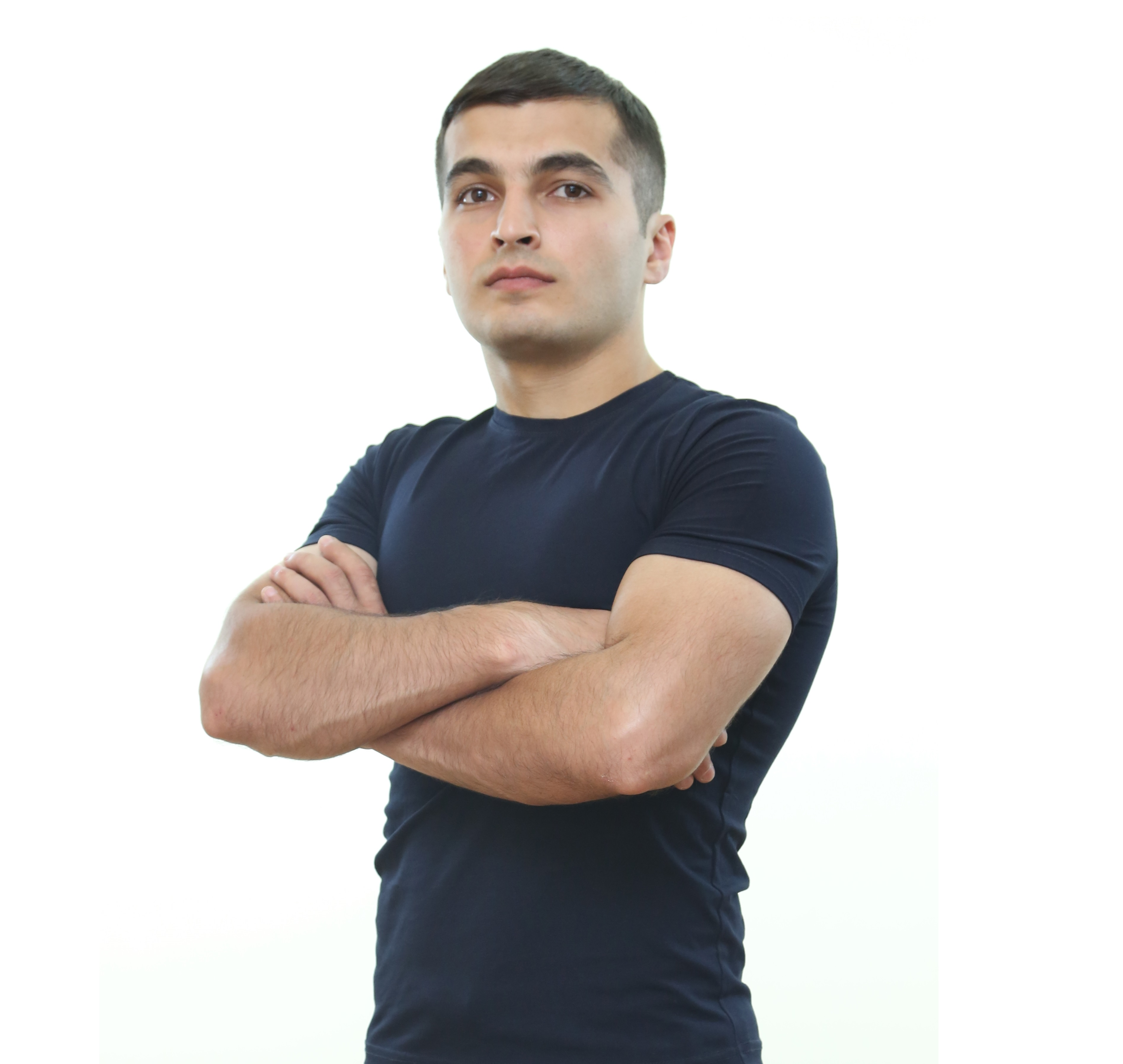
- Born: April 6, 1993 (age 33); Yerevan, Armenia
- Occupations: Fitness and workout trainer, fitness blogger
- Known for: Guinness World Records in push-up exercises
- Website: manvelmamoyan.com

Manvel Mamoyan (Armenian: Մանվել Մամոյան; Russian: Манвел Мамоян; born 6 April 1993) is an Armenian athlete and fitness trainer of Yezidi ethnicity who lives in Moscow. He has set several Guinness World Records in bodyweight exercises, mainly push-up variations, and earlier held records in Armenia's Dyutsaznagirk ("Book of Heroes"). His first Guinness record, for handstand push-ups, was set in October 2015 and dedicated to the memory of the Armenian and Yezidi victims of 1915 Armenian genocide.

== Early life ==
Mamoyan was born in Yerevan on 6 April 1993. He began judo at the age of ten and trained in Greco-Roman and freestyle wrestling until he was eighteen. He also did gymnastics for a few months.

He set his first Armenian record at fifteen, in abdominal crunches, first with 2,551 repetitions and then with 3,511. It was entered in Dyutsaznagirk. By seventeen he had set eleven records in Armenia, and by 2019 he had more than twenty. At eighteen he entered the Armenian Armed Forces, where he kept training and set records; his service ended in 2013.

After service he received a job offer in Russia and first went to Altai Krai. He returned to work at the Orange Fitness club in Yerevan and, two years later, moved to Moscow. He was living there by 2019.

== Yezidi background ==
Mamoyan is Yezidi by ethnicity. His 2015 record was coordinated by Boris Murazi, chairman of the Sinjar National Union of Yezidis, a public organization in Armenia. Murazi said the idea came out of discussions about how the Yezidi community could contribute to the centenary of the genocide of Armenians and Yezidis. The record was dedicated to that anniversary.

Mamoyan has also dedicated records to the victims of the 1915 genocide and to Armenian soldiers killed in the April 2016 Four-Day War. He describes these dedications as connected to the histories of the Armenian people and of his "native Yezidi people". His home and family are in Armenia, and he plans to return.

== Records ==
=== 2015–2016 ===
On 23 October 2015, in Armenia, Mamoyan performed 28 handstand push-ups in 48.3 seconds. The previous mark was 20, held by an athlete from Ukraine. Guinness World Records registered the result in early 2016. Mamoyan has said the process has become a business, with payments for faster decisions, adjudicators and an official badge.

On 25 August 2016 in Freedom Square, Yerevan, he attempted the record for knuckle push-ups in one minute, then held by Canadian Roy Berger with 84. He reached 83 on his first attempt and 86 on his second, which Guinness rules allow, and the result was submitted for ratification. He performed it in Armenian military uniform and dedicated it to the soldiers killed in the Four-Day War. He said he was aiming to become the holder of the most Guinness titles.

=== 2018 ===
In April 2018 Guinness World Records announced that Mamoyan had completed 37 handstand push-ups in one minute in Yerevan, passing the 36 set by a Belarusian athlete. Guinness also credited him with the male record for jump squats in one minute, with 67.

=== 2019 ===
In 2019 Mamoyan was working in Russia, and with fellow record-setter Aharon Virabyan he founded a street workout team in Moscow called Danger Workout. He said he intended to set ten Guinness records that year. On 27 June in Moscow he performed 73 handstand push-ups in three minutes, against a previous mark of 55.

In August, near the Cathedral of the Intercession on Red Square, he performed 55 one-arm, two-finger push-ups in one minute, beating the previous mark of 52. Guinness World Records confirmed the record.

On 26 September at the Masters fitness club in Moscow he performed 610 handstand push-ups in one hour, double the previous mark of 300. On the same day he completed 13 elevated tiger-bend push-ups in one minute, which Guinness World Records lists.

In December he performed 16 handstand push-ups in one minute while wearing a 40-pound (18.15 kg) weighted vest, in a category with no earlier entry, and dedicated the attempt to a girl named Azalina.

=== 2020 ===
In March 2020 he performed 41 one-arm, one-leg push-ups in one minute during a livestreamed attempt in Moscow, against a previous mark of 36. By July 2020 he had eight officially confirmed Guinness records and others awaiting confirmation. He holds the Russian title of master of sport in street lifting and was preparing for a world street workout championship, with a shoulder injury as a concern.

== See also ==
- List of Yezidi people
- Yezidis in Armenia
