= Enemy (rapper) =

German rapper and physician

- Born: Rubas Saido; 5 May 1998 (age 28); Hanover, Germany
- Genre: Hip-hop
- Occupations: Rapper; physician
- Labels: Generation Azzlack (2016–2020); GMG

Rubas Saido (born 5 May 1998), known professionally as Enemy, is a German-Yezidi rapper and physician from Hanover. He first released music as "The Enemy" before 2013 and appeared on Haftbefehl's track "Kalash" in 2015. In 2016 he signed to Generation Azzlack, a label founded by Haftbefehl and Capo, and released the mixtape Portami Via (2018) and the album Lebendig begraben (2019). After leaving the label in February 2020 he released Stunde Null (2021) through GMG; it reached number 18 on the German albums chart. He studied medicine in Cluj-Napoca, Romania, alongside his music career, and has worked as a general practitioner in Giesen since 2025.

== Early life and education ==
Saido was born in Hanover to parents from Syria. He is Yezidi. He grew up in Hanover, first in Mühlenberg and later in Sahlkamp. His father came to Germany as a political refugee, had studied law in Syria and was a member of the Syrian Communist Party.

Saido was encouraged to value education from an early age. He originally planned to return to his parents' country of origin to study medicine, which the war in Syria made impossible. He attended the Humboldtschule and then the Herschelschule in Hanover, where he took his Abitur in 2015. According to a 2018 post by Zeit Campus, he skipped the eighth grade and finished school with an average of 1.3. He has described himself as unruly at school, and his stage name dates from that period.

After the Abitur he began studying medicine at the Iuliu Hațieganu University of Medicine and Pharmacy in Cluj-Napoca. He later completed his medical studies.

== Career ==
=== Generation Azzlack (before 2013–2020) ===
Before 2013, Saido released his first rap tracks under the name The Enemy. He has said he wrote poetry before he began to rap.

In 2015 he appeared on Haftbefehl's track "Kalash". In 2016 Haftbefehl and Capo founded the label Generation Azzlack and signed Enemy, his cousin Diar and Soufian. He appeared on Soufian's "Wo sind die Packs" (January 2017), Azzi Memo's "Ich finde dich" (May 2017) and Diar's "Click" and "Cousins" (September 2017).

His mixtape Portami Via was released on 27 April 2018 and reached number 88 on the German albums chart. It contains "Arztlack", a word play combining "Azzlack" and Arzt (doctor) that Enemy has used as a nickname. Raptastisch called the song a classic of the Generation Azzlack era.

He announced his debut album Lebendig begraben in September 2019 with the video for "Ich glaube nicht". It was released on 22 November 2019 and has twelve tracks with no guest rappers. On 9 February 2020, Enemy and Generation Azzlack announced an amicable separation.

=== Stunde Null and medical career (2021–present) ===
Stunde Null was released on 31 March 2021 through GMG. The thirteen-track album is credited to producers Emiray and ProDK, with Neem featured on "Bipolar". It entered the German albums chart at number 18 and remained for one week. Raptastisch reported that he gave up music after the album.

In May 2025 he joined an internal medicine general practice in Giesen as a physician. In August 2026 he said in a video that he was working on new music while continuing to work as a physician.

== Artistry and reception ==
Enemy's lyrics draw on both his life as a rapper and his medical studies. In an interview he described moving between two milieus, one of street rappers and one of academics, and said he was comfortable in both.

== Personal life ==
Saido speaks German, English, French, Romanian and Kurdish.

=== Yezidi identity ===
Saido is Yezidi and has spoken publicly about his religion.

In April 2021, a recording circulated online in which the music manager Arafat Abou-Chaker made derogatory remarks about Yezidism during a conversation on Clubhouse, referring to its followers as devil worshippers. Abou-Chaker apologised, first in a separate Clubhouse group with several Yezidis and then in an Instagram post, saying he had lacked information about the religion. Enemy responded in an Instagram video, saying the remarks spread false information and hatred about Yezidism but that he did not consider them humiliating and that others should not either, as "Yezidism doesn't care what some pimp says about Yezidism". He said he would make it a personal task to do educational work on the Yezidi religion.

== Discography ==
=== Studio albums ===
Title	Details	Peak position
Title	Details	GER
Lebendig begraben	Released: 22 November 2019; Label: Generation Azzlack	—
Stunde Null	Released: 31 March 2021; Label: GMG	18

=== Mixtapes ===
Title	Details	Peak position
Title	Details	GER
Portami Via	Released: 27 April 2018; Label: Generation Azzlack	88

=== Guest appearances ===
- "Kalash" (Haftbefehl, 2015)
- "Wo sind die Packs" (Soufian feat. Enemy, Diar and Azzi Memo, 2017)
- "Ich finde dich" (Azzi Memo, 2017)
- "Click" and "Cousins" (Diar, 2017)

== See also ==
- List of Yezidi people
- Yezidism in Syria
