= Yezidism in Turkey =

Religion in Turkey

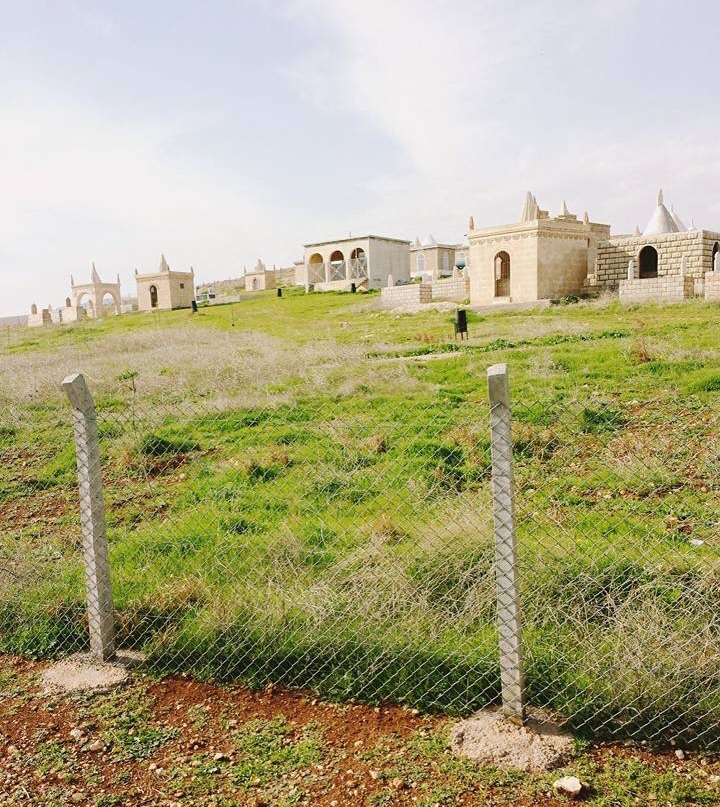
The Yazidi cemetery Hesen Begê in southeastern Turkey

Yazidism in Turkey refers to adherents of Yazidism from Turkey, who remained in Turkey after the dissolution of the Ottoman Empire. The Yazidis living in Turkey during and after the second half of the 20th century gradually left for European countries. In the 1980s, there were 60,000 Yazidis situated in Beşiri, Kurtalan, Bismil, Midyat, Idil, Cizre, Nusaybin, Viranşehir, Suruç and Bozova. Today, these places are almost empty due to exodus to Europe which was provoked by political, religious and economic difficulties. Today only small number remain in villages around Midyat, Viranşehir, Çınar, Nusaybin and Beşiri. According to the census of 2000, only 423 individuals adhering to Yazidism remained in the country.

Approximate current settlement area of the Yazidis in Southeastern Anatolia. The provinces of Mardin, Batman, Şanlıurfa and parts of Şırnak and Diyarbakır provinces are inhabited by Yazidis.

== Demography ==
According to the Society for Threatened Peoples, 300,000 Yazidis originally lived in Turkey.

In the 1980s, the number of Yazidis in Turkey was around 60,000. In 1993, the number was estimated to be 24,309.

In 2003, the United States Department of State's Bureau for Democracy, Human Rights, and Labor stated that 5,000 Yazidis live in Turkey.

In 2004, the Federal Office for Migration and Refugees reported that more than 2,000 Yazidis (mainly in south-eastern Anatolia) live in Turkey.

In 2019, the number of Yazidis in Turkey was less than 1,000 according to the United States federal government estimate.

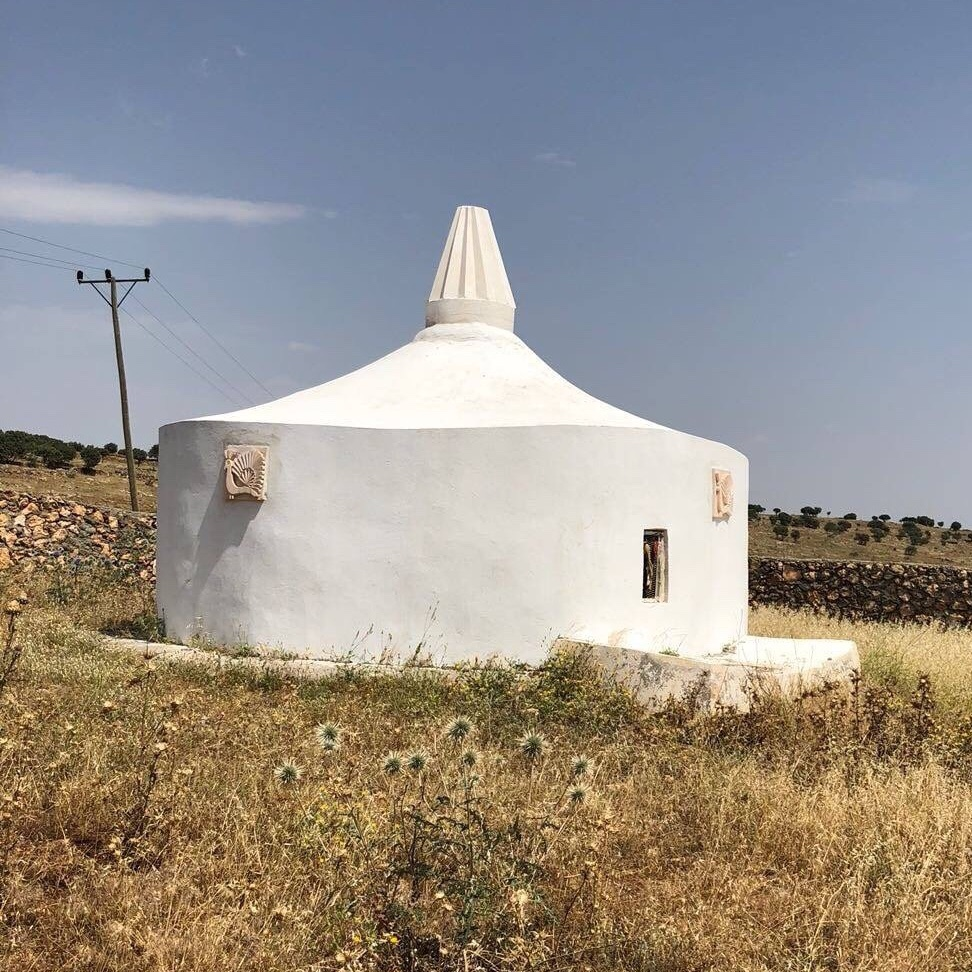
A Yazidi temple in the Yazidi village of Güven (Bacin) in Midyat County, Mardin Province

== Settlement areas ==
Historically, the Yazidis lived in Turkey in the east, south, and south-east of Turkey. The current settlement area of Yazidis in Turkey includes Midyat and Nusaybin counties in Mardin province, Batman and Beşiri counties in Batman province and parts of İdil counties in Şırnak province. Other Yazidi settlement areas are in Sur, Bismil and Çınar counties in Diyarbakır province and in Viranşehir district in Şanlıurfa province.

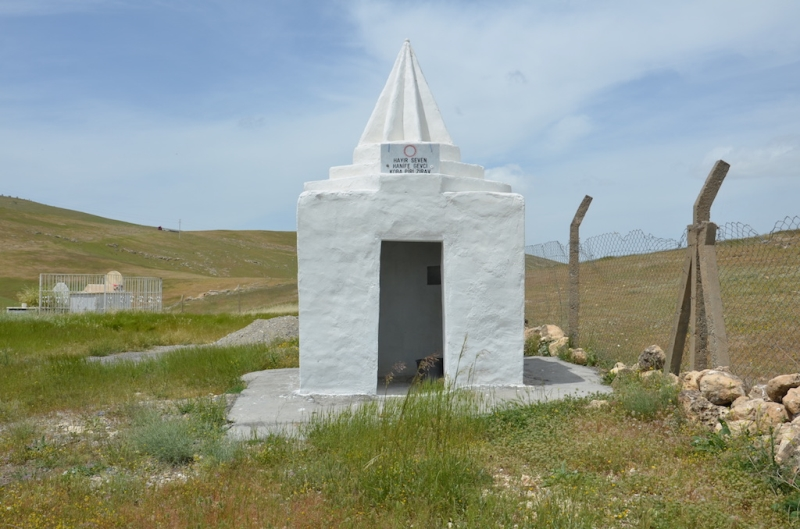
The Yazidi Temple Pire Zirav in the Yazidi village of Yolveren (Çineriya) in Batman County in the Batman Province of the same name

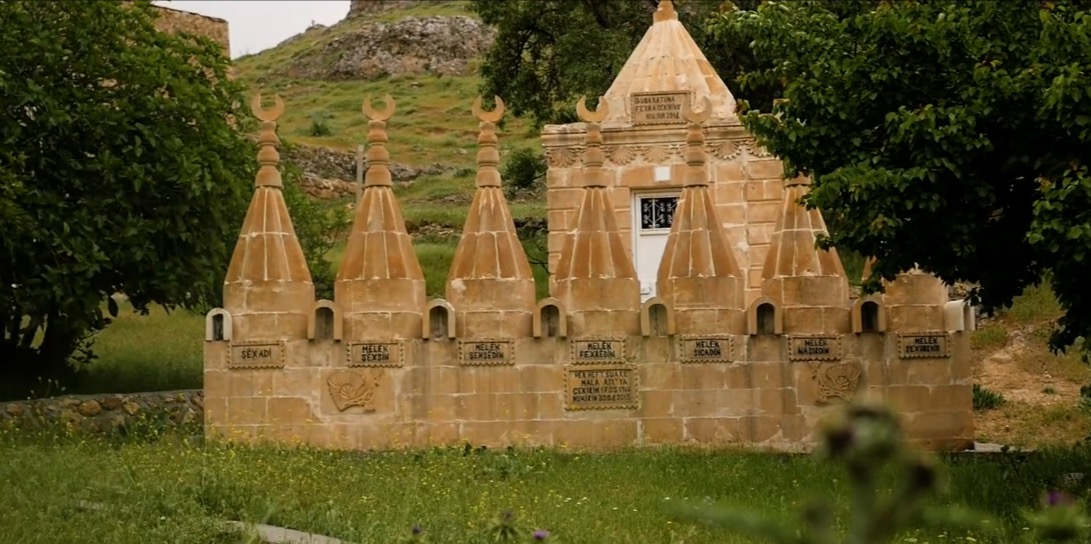
A Yazidi temple in the Yazidi village of Mağara (Kiwex) in İdil County, Şırnak Province

== History ==
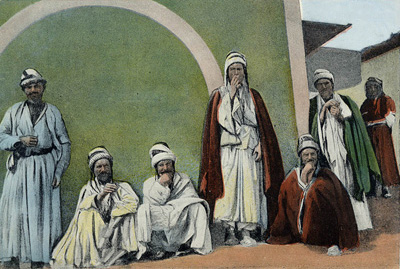
A group of Yazidis around Mardin. (Late 1800s, image is from a French postcard)

Yazidis are native to an area of the Middle East historically known as Mesopotamia (more specifically, they are indigenous to the northern part of Mesopotamia) which also includes southeastern Turkey.

The modern state of Turkey was founded in 1923. Yazidis lived on the territory of present-day Turkey before the establishment of the modern state of Turkey. Yazidi tribes lived in the Ottoman provinces of Mosul, Diyarbekir, Van, Bitlis and Aleppo after Sultan Selim conquered eastern Anatolia, Mosul and Syria between 1514 and 1516.

In 1835 during an Ottoman campaign against the Soran Emirate, Reşid Mehmed Pasha targeted the Garzan region, where Yazidis were in the majority, bringing the entire Garzan region and the tribes around Diyarbakir under his control.

In 1844, the Yazidis in Turkey, who were in the Tur Abdin region, were massacred by the Kurdish prince Bedirkhan Beg and his troops.

Recently, some Yazidis who are from Turkey and have lived in Germany have returned to their villages in Turkey.

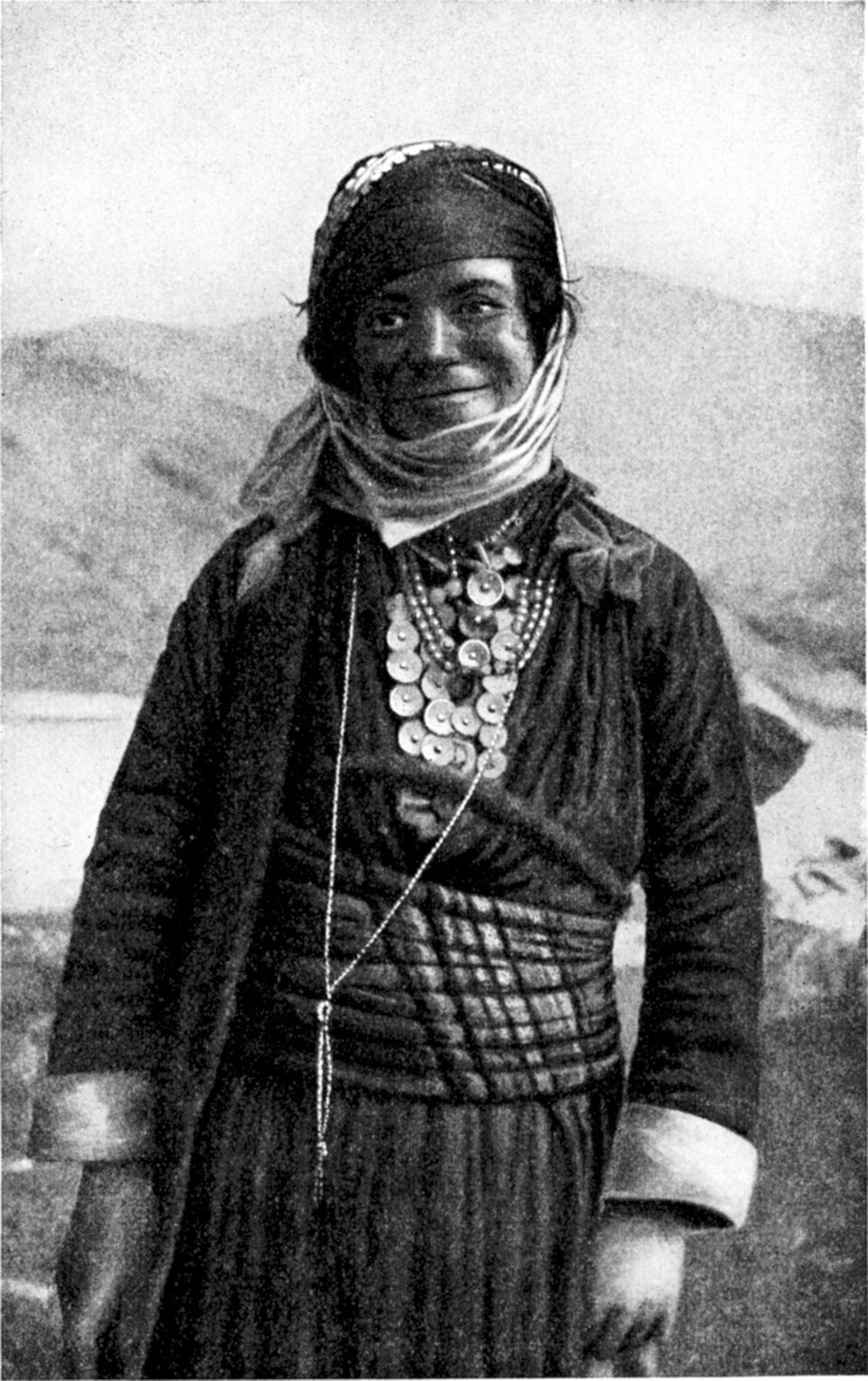
A Yazidi woman on the Mount Ararat. (1922)

=== Exodus to the Caucasus ===
In the 19th century and in the early 20th century, the Yazidis began to flee the Van, Kars and Dogubayazit regions of eastern Turkey during two main waves of migrations, the first wave taking place during the Russo-Ottoman wars of 19th century (1828–1829 and 1879–1882) and the second wave taking place during World War 1, especially during and after the Armenian genocide where Yazidis were also targeted alongside Armenians. Before migrating, Yazidis formed an integral part of Kurdish tribal interactions during the Ottoman Empire. The Yazidis of Armenia who arrived during the first wave of migrations, settled in Aparan and Talin provinces in the mountainous regions of Aragatz, whereas the Yazidis who arrived during the second wave settled in villages across Ashtarak, Echmiadzin and Armavir. Main causes of these migrations was war and religious persecution at the hands of Ottoman Turks and the Muslim Kurds who were trying to forcibly convert them to Islam.

==== Armenian Genocide ====
Yazidis were massacred alongside Armenians, Assyrians and Pontic Greeks during the Armenian genocide in 1915 and 1916, which then led to many Yazidis fleeing. Turkey denies the genocide. During the genocide there was the slogan "Those who kill 7 Armenians will go to Heaven" and also the version "Those who kill 7 Yazidis will go to Heaven" were used. According to Aziz Tamoyan, over 300,000 Yazidis were killed with the Armenians, while others fled to Transcaucasia.

=== Escape to Germany ===
Due to persecution, oppression and discrimination, Yazidis fled Turkey in two major immigration waves, the first wave began in the 1960s; many Yazidis were among the guest workers from Turkey. Some settled in Celle, where the Telefunken company started producing color televisions in a new factory here in 1966. The second wave took place after the 1980 Turkish military coup. When Yazidis, like many of their fellow Kurds, suffered under the dictatorship of General Kenan Evren. Yazidis were recognized as a persecuted group for the first time by the administrative court of Stade and after the next few years, North-Rhine Westphalia followed suit as a federal state. After fleeing, the Federal Constitutional Court also declared the Yazidis to be a persecuted group.

According to the German Bundestag, the majority of Yazidis have left Turkey in the last 30 years.

In 1989, Gernot Wießner and Herbert Schnoor traveled to Turkey with a delegation to see for themselves the persecution of the Yazidis. They campaigned in North Rhine-Westphalia for the right to stay for the Yazidis, whereupon the Yazidis were recognized as a persecuted group in Germany.

== See also ==
- Yazidis in Iraq
- Yazidis in Syria

== Literature ==
- Çakır Ceyhan Suvari: Yezidis: An Ethno-Religious Group in Turkey (2016)
- Rohat Cebe, Ersoy Soydan: Batman Yezidis and Yezidis Oral Tradition (2012)
