= Ezidi Mirza =

Yezidi leader (1600–1651)

- Born: 1600; Bashiqa, Mosul Eyalet, Ottoman Empire
- Died: 1651 (aged 50–51); Mosul Eyalet, Ottoman Empire
- Military career
- Conflicts: Ottoman-Safavid war: Battle of Baghdad

Ezidi Mirza (or Ezidi Mirza Hesen, Mirza Pasha and Daseni Mirza Beg; 1600 – 1651) was a Yezidi leader, who is mentioned in Yezidi sagas, poems and stories due to his heroic and military exploits. He was born 1600 AD in a respected family of the Sheikh caste from the Qatanî lineage of Şêx Simayîlê Enzelî in the town of Bashiqa as the youngest of three brothers. In 1649 AD, he was appointed as the governor of Mosul.

== Early life ==
Together with his siblings, Ezidi Mirza was raised as an orphan by his relatives after a battle against Kurdish and Arab Muslim raiders in circa 1605 AD in which his family was killed. During his childhood, Mirza spent most of his time in the markets of Mosul together with his two brothers as orphans living in poverty. They would often steal food from the market to survive, but the merchants tolerated this. After an attempt to steal plants from a farm, the three brothers were caught and brought to the Ottoman guards and imprisoned. Once the guards realized that they are Yezidis, the three brothers were tortured. Each of the brothers, starting from the oldest, were then told to kill their brothers in order to be set free, after both of the older brothers refused, they moved on to Ezidi Mîrza, who was young and could not understand what was going on. They put a knife in his hand and he was forced to cut his own brothers' throats before being thrown into an alley by the guards.

He wandered on the streets alone while covered in blood, until a trader recognized him, asked him what had happened and took him back to Bashiqa. The news of this tragedy quickly spread, which angered the community. Ezidi Mirza was sheltered by the religious clergy, who gave him training in religious knowledge and taught him to read and write.

Once Mirza grew up, he got married and became a religious teacher himself. He also began to show interest in military strategies and tactics from a young age. The constant raids by the Muslims on the Yezidis and his tragic childhood had convinced Mirza that military expertise was essential.

== First military achievements and rise to power ==
Approximately 15 years after the Muslim raid on Bashiqa and Bahzani, in which Mirza lost his family, the settlement was attacked again by raiders from Sunni Kurdish and Arab tribes. Despite being outnumbered, Ezidi Mîrza was still successful in gathering up fighters, organizing a counter-attack and cornering the raiders, resulting in a devastating defeat for the raiders. News of Mirza's victory spread in the region and was celebrated by Yezidis. The 20 year old Mirza gained fame as a heroic figure in the community, became known for his bravery and horsemanship, and proved himself a capable leader. Ottoman sources report that Mirza later commanded around 3,000 trained Yezidi fighters.

At the age of 25, Mirza was appointed as the head of Bashiqa-Bahzani community. He had intimate and cordial contacts with the Yezidi Mir, Zeynal Begê Çavbixalî. When the Ottoman-Safavid war broke out, the Yezidis ended up in the middle of two fronts. Ezidi Mirza, who had now become the commander in chief of all Yezidis, was aware that the Yezidis could only survive this war by siding with only one of the two sides. Since the invasion, the Safavids had launched attacks on his Yezidi brethren further east, in addition, the Ottomans were stationed in the immediate vicinity of the Yezidi centre near Mosul, therefore, Ezidi Mirza chose to fight on the Ottomans' side. According to the reports of Mustafa Naima, Ezidi Mirza was personally received and recognized by Sultan Murad IV as the commander-in-chief of the Yezidi fighters. In the report, Ezidi Mirza is heroized for his service during the Battle of Baghdad between the Safavids and Ottomans in 1638. The Mîr of the Yezidis at the time, Mîr Zeynal Begê Çavbixalî, was also involved in the battle together with six other eminent Yezidi chieftains, Temo Babikî, Pîrikê Xoşabî, Qerece Rexacî, Qere Babikî, Xizikî Dumilî, Şêx Dirî and Şêx Babikê Kuremîş, who joined Ezidi Mirza.

=== Siege of Baghdad ===
The Ottoman troops were able to besiege Baghdad in this battle. During the clashes, the Yezidi troops under Ezidi Mirza were not only successful in holding and defending their position, but also in advancing into the camp of a Safavid commander. The Yezidi units gained the upper advantage and killed the Safavid commander. After this, Ezidi Mirza and his troops advanced further, attacking the demoralized Safavid troops and killing their commander Saru Khan in his own tent. Ezidi Mirza's exploits did not go unnoticed by the Ottomans. The reputation and the strength of the Ezidi Mirza decreased further attacks and hostility from the neighbouring Muslims. The Sheikhan region in particular experienced a period of calm and security.

== Conflict with Ottomans ==
After the previous exploits, Ottomans and Yezidis were able to agree on a peace treaty, which did not last long as the Ottomans launched an expedition against Yezidis in Shingal in 1640 AD. A few years earlier, the Yezidis of Shingal had managed to defeat the Ottoman commander Nasuh Pasha and kill over 7,000 Ottoman soldiers according to the reports of the Ottoman traveller Evliya Çelebi. The Yezidis controlled all trade routes in Shingal and the surrounding area, refused to submit and pay the taxes levied by the Ottomans. The Yezidis attacked caravans of Ottoman goods on the Sinjar road.

This led to the governor of Mosul, Melek Ahmed Pasha, who was known for being hostile to Yezidis, to launch an attack on Shingal with an army of 70,000 troops. He demanded the Yezidis to return the plundered goods and to pay the taxes due. In response, Yezidi warriors retreated to the Sinjar Mountains and offered resistance. Despite outnumbering the Yezidis, the Turks suffered heavy casualties before defeating the battle-hardened Yezidis in the harsh mountainous terrain.

== Appointment as the Governor of Mosul and death ==
In 1649 AD, Ezidi Mirza was appointed as the governor of Mosul by the Grand Vizier Kara Murad Pasha. During his brief reign, Mosul saw an economical and agricultural boom, and the Yezidis enjoyed rare security, they were able to build up their wealth, work and trade in the city without much fear and the Yezidi shrines in Mosul were rebuilt under his rule. However, according to Yezidi sagas, there was also a personal motive behind Ezidi Mirza's strive for power, as after becoming the governor of Mosul, Mirza immediately began to take revenge for his two brothers. Mirza ordered the demolition of the farm of the farmer who had caught and handed him and his brothers over to the Ottoman guards. Thereafter he ordered the families of those Ottoman guards who had forced him to murder his brothers, to be captured and brought to his castle, where Mirza confronted them and personally had them slaughtered.

Just a year later, when Kara Murad Pasha was deposed from his office, Ezidi Mirza, like the other governors, lost his position. Mirza decided to go to Istanbul to protest his removal. Melek Ahmad Pasha, who was responsible for the great invasion of Shingal in 1640, became the new Grand Vizier of the Ottomans. His hatred of the Yezidis had remained and he made sure that Ezidi Mirza was not to be given back his position. When Mirza was informed about the appointment of the new Grand Vizier, he began to plan a rebellion in secrecy. One day, on a trip back to Bashiqa with 60 guards, he died in an ambush by Ottoman soldiers.

His death led to anger in the Yezidi regions and eventually to a major rebellion led by the new chief named Imadin Hakkari who raised an army of 6,000 warriors with the support of other Yezidi leaders including the Mîr Zeynal Begê Çavbixalî. Yezidis were able to overtake large swathes of territory, including the Barwari region from the Ottoman and Sunni Kurdish alliance. Eventually, Ottomans were able to push Yezidis back after sending reinforcements to Diyarbekir, however, because of heavy casualties, Ottomans decided to hold peace talks with the Yezidi leaders. As part of the agreement, Ottomans would withdraw their troops from Hakkari region, therefore, Bahdinan would see a period of peace and harmony thereafter.
