= Yurik Mamedov =

French-Yazidi professional boxer

Personal information
- Nickname: DBSBC
- Nationality: French
- Born: 10 December 1990 (age 35) Yaroslavl, Russia
- Height: 5 ft 9 in (1.75 m)
- Weight: lightweight, super lightweight, welterweight

Boxing career
- Stance: Orthodox

Boxing record
- Total fights: 20
- Wins: 17
- Losses: 2
- Draws: 1

Yurik Mamedov (born 10 December 1990) is a French-Yazidi professional boxer who was born in Russia and is based in Brooklyn, New York. He has fought at lightweight, super lightweight and welterweight and has won regional titles from the World Boxing Association (WBA), including the Fedecaribe, Fedecentro and Continental belts. His record was 17 wins, 2 losses and 1 draw after his last listed bout in 2023. He competes under the ring name "Fighting Pride of the Yazidis" and has said he wants to use his career to draw attention to the persecution of Yazidis.
