= Pîr Xidir Silêman =

Kurdish-Yazidi writer, teacher, and parliamentarian (1952–2021)

- Born: 1952; Ain Sifni, Shekhan, Iraq
- Died: November 15, 2021 (aged 69); Shekhan, Kurdistan Region, Iraq
- Education: University of Baghdad
- Occupations: Writer, teacher, parliamentarian
- Writing career
- Language: Kurdish, Arabic
- Years active: 1973–2021
- Period: 1970s–2021
- Genres: Non-fiction, Religious Studies, Kurdish Literature
- Subjects: Yazidism, Kurdish culture, Kurdish literature
- Notable works: Êzdiyati (In Light of the Scripts of Êzidîsm), Gundiyatî

Pîr Xidir Silêman (1952 – 15 November 2021) was a Kurdish-Yazidi writer, teacher and parliamentarian. He was born 1952 in the town of Ain Sifni in Shekhan, Iraq. He completed his secondary education in Shekhan in 1970 and studied Kurdish language and literature at the University of Baghdad. In 1974-1975, he worked as a translator for Dengê Kurdistan Radio and in 1977 he became Kurdish language teacher in Shekhan. In 1979, he joined Kurdish Writers' Union, of whom he became the president from 1991 to 1997, making him the first Yazidi to run the Union. He was also the editor-in-chief for their magazine. From 1992-1997, he was the president of Lalish Cultural Center, which he co-founded and was established in 1993 to archive and preserve Yazidi culture and history. He also edited for Lalish Magazine, which was owned by him until his death. In 2005, he became a member of Kurdistan Parliament. On 14–15 November 2021, he suffered a stroke at his home in Shekhan and was taken to Azadi Hospital in Duhok, where he died some hours later due to heart attack.

== Career ==
In the 1970s, a group of Yazidi writers emerged, who found it necessary to prevent outsiders from writing about their own religion and beliefs, and took upon themselves to write about their own faith. Among these writers was Pîr Xidir and Khalil Jindy, who together in 1979 published the book "Êzdiyati" (In Light of the Scripts of Êzidîsm) which was printed by the Kurdish Scientific Academy. These two writers started working together to clarify the beliefs of their own religion and correct fallacies after 1964-1965 school year, when they were attending 8th Grade at Ain Sifni High School. They were in a religiously-mixed class of Muslims, Christians and a Yazidi majority. On a cold winter day of that year, at the beginning of an Islamic Education lesson, the teacher entered the class and ordered all students who had no religion to go out. Silêman and Jindy went out with their Christian classmates hurt by this deep humiliation. As rain was pouring that day and there was no place they could have shelter. Silêman and Jindy returned to the class to object to the teacher's provocative statement of them having no religion. While confronting the teacher in the class, the teacher asked them questions to which they had no answer. Since then, according to Silêman, their concern has been to explore what Yazidism is about.

Êzdiyati (In Light of the Scripts of Êzidîsm) became the foundation and starting point for the study of Yazidism and it was the first-ever book to be written in Kurmanji Kurdish, the native language of Yazidis. With this book, both authors were able to clarify and correct many misconceptions about Yazidis that had been written by foreigners. The book included a collection of 22 religious texts recited by the Yazidis in Iraq.

In 1973, Pîr Xidir published a series of articles to correct the fallacies he had read in Abdurrazzaq Hassani's book "Êzidîsm" in 1968, three of these articles were published in "Folklore" magazine. However, when he tried to publish the fourth article in the magazine, Lutfi Khouri, the editor-in-chief of the magazine, showed him a letter addressed to him by the Iraqi Ministry of Information prohibiting further publication on Yazidism. According to Khouri, Hassani had visited them in fury, and said "how dared a young man (referring to Pîr Xidir) criticize my writings although I am the greatest Historian of Iraq?". Folklore magazine was the most famous magazine in Iraq that published about the heritage of national and religious minority groups within Iraq. This deprivation against Pîr Xidir to try and change wrong misconceptions about Yazidis held by Muslim Arabs, pushed him to start writing and publishing in Kurdish from 1973 to 1991.

In 1985, Pîr Xidir published his second book, "Gundiyatî", in Baghdad, which included five more religious texts, namely Qewls.

After Kurds achieved semi-autonomy in 1991, Yazidis were given an unprecedented freedom to express themselves, Yazidi scholars became active and Yazidi research centers were established. Pîr Xidir, together with his colleague Khalil Jindy, played roles in raising Yazidi awareness through establishing Yazidi research centers that specialized in Yazidi affairs. Pîr Xidir headed the "Lalish Center" that was founded in Iraq, whereas Khalil Jindy led "Ezidism Center" which was established abroad. The “Lalish Center”, founded 1993, was the first research center that focused on Yazidi culture and heritage and sought to clarify the truth about Yazidism, its philosophy, identity, customs and rituals. Its establishment was a turning point due to its publications of studies and research on Yazidi heritage and folklore. It has published and documented Yazidi traditions, beliefs and collected religious scripts, rituals and feasts through its "Lalish magazine" which publishes in Kurdish, Arabic and English. The Center has held cultural seminars and festivals, provided a well-established floor for scholars of Yazidism, and published and printed the education textbooks about Yazidism which are used in the elementary schools within the Yazidi areas of Kurdistan Region.

Pîr Xidir started writing in Arabic again after 1991 and was active through "Lalish magazine" and the Lalish Cultural Center, however he returned to his silence when ISIS took over Sinjar and committed genocides against Yazidis. Forty days after ISIS occupation of Sinjar, he set fire to his works in Arabic to protest against the silence and failure of Arabs to condemn the criminal acts against Yazidis and to express his disappointment over his decades of writing in Arabic not having changed the stereotypes of the beliefs and origin of Yazidism.

== See also ==
- List of Kurdish scholars
