= Vian Dakhil =

Kurdish member of Iraqi Parliament

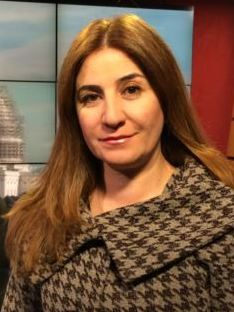

MP

Personal details
- Born: Vian Dakhil; 1971 (age 54–55)
- Party: Kurdistan Democratic Party

Vian Dakhil (Kurdish: ڤیان ده‌خیل, romanized: Viyan Dexîl, born 1971 in Mosul) is a current member of the Iraqi parliament. She is the only Yazidi Kurdish woman in the Iraqi parliament.

== Career ==
Dakhil gained international attention during a plea for assistance for Yazidis trapped in the Sinjar Mountains during Islamic State capture of Sinjar, accusing Islamic State of genocide against the Yazidis. This plea was a speech held in the Iraqi parliament held on Tuesday, 5 August 2014. In the anglophone world, the speech has gained a large audience after coverage from CNN and mentions in the Washington Post.

In the francophone world it was Tunisian magazine “Kapitalis”, the Algerian participative journal “ChoufChouf” and the “paysagesblog” in le Monde.fr which commented the plea for help of Vian Dakhil for Yazidi people facing extermination. All the French articles included a YouTube version of Vian Dakhil speech, some with French translations. The blogpost "Je vous en supplie, frères, faîtes taire vos différences pour sauver les Yézidis!" in the "YOL (routes de Turquie et d'ailleurs) blog" has also a YouTube video of the speech including English subtitles.

In an Interview for Agence France-Presse, distributed by leMonde.fr on 9 of August 2014 she warned that, if help was not arriving immediately – then a massive dying of the Yazidi people would begin – in the French original “« Il ne reste qu'un ou deux jours pour aider ces gens. Après, il vont commencer à mourir en masse ».

In February 2016 she was a speaker at the Geneva Summit for Human Rights and Democracy. In January and February 2016, Human Rights Watch interviewed many Arab, Sunni, Muslim, and Iraqi women from Hawija, and also interviewed the parliament "Dakhil " from the Yazidi area. Dakhil explains that all the Yazidis who escaped from the areas which were under control of Daesh. Many spent more than a year in captivity. Daesh forced the women to convert to Islam. Documented by Human Rights Watch, the systematic rape of women and girls for the first time in early 2015. In Daesh areas, women are also suffering from the intensively high prices of food and cash deficit. Especially, since the Iraqi government stopped sending public employees' salaries to areas which it is under control Daesh in the mid-2015. She asserts that women lived in fear of air raids by US-led coalition and Iraqi government forces. Human Rights Watches confirmed the fate of Yezidi women in region, interviewing those forced to flee who cited fear of attack from Daesh and lack of food as reasons for fleeing.

On the 12th of August 2014, Dakhil was injured when an Iraqi aid helicopter crashed during a mission to deliver aid to the Yazidi people who were under siege by ISIL in Sinjar, Mosul. She reportedly broke her leg whilst the Iraqi helicopter pilot lost his life. Dakhil was mistakenly reported dead in an earlier news report.

== Awards and honors ==
Vian Dakhil has been recognised and honoured for her important work in bringing the Kurds-Yazidis plight to the international community. She was congratulated by the Iraqi Parliament, and honoured by the Iraqi Women's Network in October 2014, and was subsequently awarded the title of the Woman of the Year. She is the Winner of the 2014 Anna Politkovskaya Award for her “courage to become the voice of the Yazidi community and by her determination to campaign for the protection of all Yazidi and other Iraqi women under ISIS, despite the danger she is facing as a Kurdish woman politician opposed to ISIS.” She was crowned Woman of the Year in 2015 with an honorary prize for Arabic achievements in Dubai. She received the Bruno Kreisky Prize for Services to Human Rights in Vienna, and the Nineveh honorary shield in June 2015. In February 2016 Dakhil was awarded the Geneva Summit Prize for Human Rights in Geneva.

== See also ==
- 2014 Northern Iraq offensive
- List of Yazidi people
