= Mahma Xelil =

Iraqi politician

Mahma Xelil (Kurdish: Mahma Xelîl, Arabic: محما خليل - also written as Mahma Khalil or Mehme Khalil) is the current mayor of Sinjar in Nineveh Province, Iraq.

== Mayor of Sinjar ==
Xelil was a self-appointed mayor of Sinjar of Kurdish Yazidi origin on November 11, 2015. Due to the presence of Daesh in Sinjar, the election was actually held in Alqosh in Nineveh Governorate. Once returning to Sinjar and unearthing the mass graves of Yazidis, Xelil has called the actions of Daesh in the Sinjar region a "genocide of the Yazidis."

== Previous roles ==
Xelil was a member of parliament in the Iraqi Parliament representing the Kurdistan Alliance as well as a Peshmerga commander.
