= Sheikh Ali Ilyas =

Religious leader of the Yazidi

Sheikh Ali Ilyas (born 1979, Kurdish: Şêx Elî Elyas) (Sorani Kurdish: شێخ عەلی ئیلیاس) is the Baba Sheikh of the Yazidis since November 2020.

== Biography ==
Ilyas was born in Sheikhan, Dohuk Province in Iraq in 1979. His father was the Yazidi spiritual leader from 1978 to 1995.

Ilyas was sworn in at Lalish Temple on 18 November 2020, and was given the title Baba Sheikh by Yazidi community leader Mir Hazim Tahsin Beg, more than a month after the death of previous Yazidi spiritual leader Khurto Hajji Ismail. According to Yazidi religious rules, only the Mir is able to name a new spiritual leader. Ilyas "prayed for the strengthening of peaceful coexistence in Kurdistan Region, Iraq, and across the globe." Ilyas was congratulated by Kurdish leader Masoud Barzani.

However, some Yazidis disagreed with Ilyas' appointment, in particular in the Shingal area, who have refused to recognise him. Shingal Peshmerga commander Qassim Shasho resigned from the Kurdistan Democratic Party and the Peshmerga over the decision.
