= Shekhan District =

Şêxan District قضاء شيخان قەزای شێخان
- District
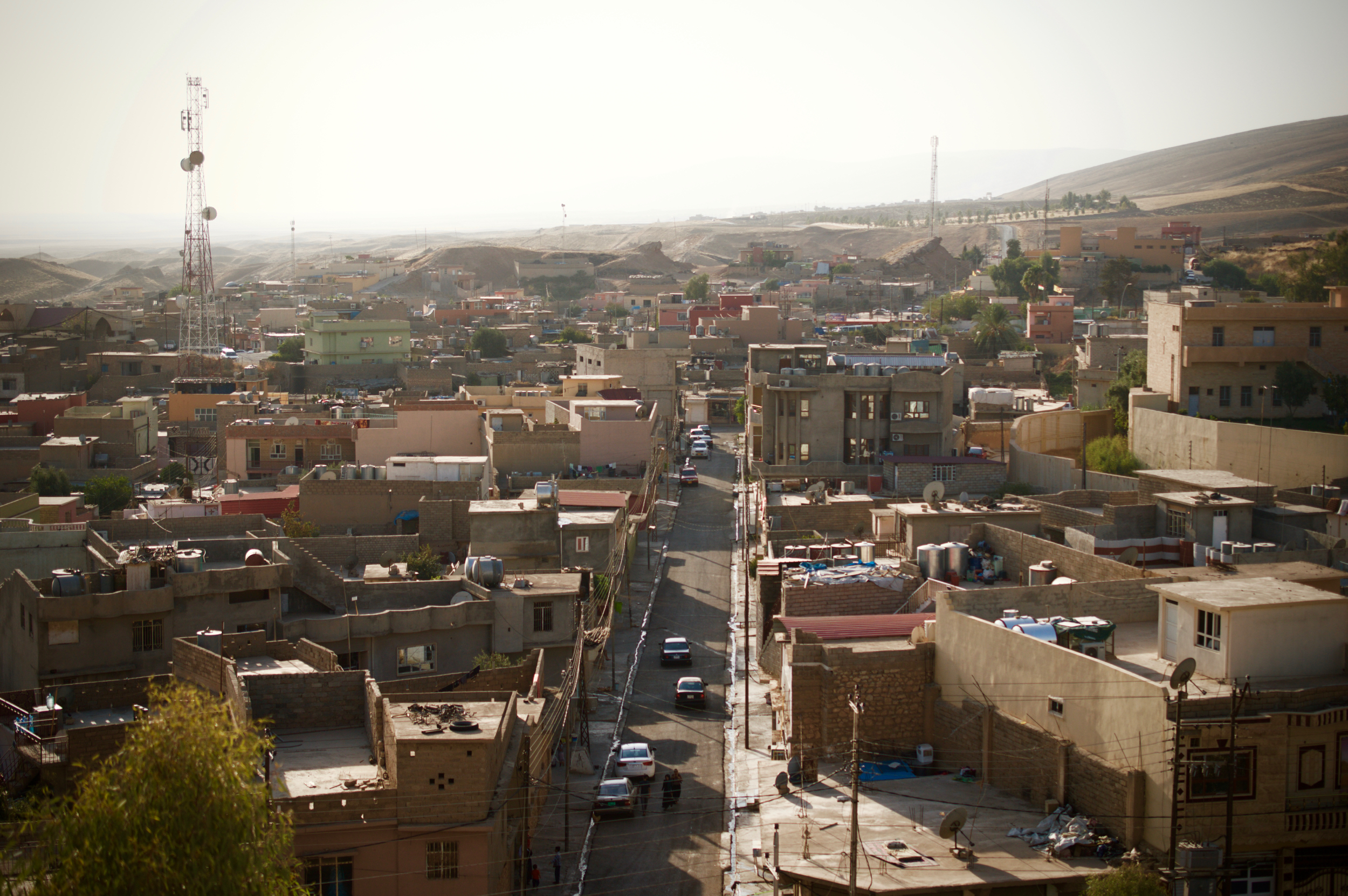
- Image of Shekhan, the administrative centre of the district.

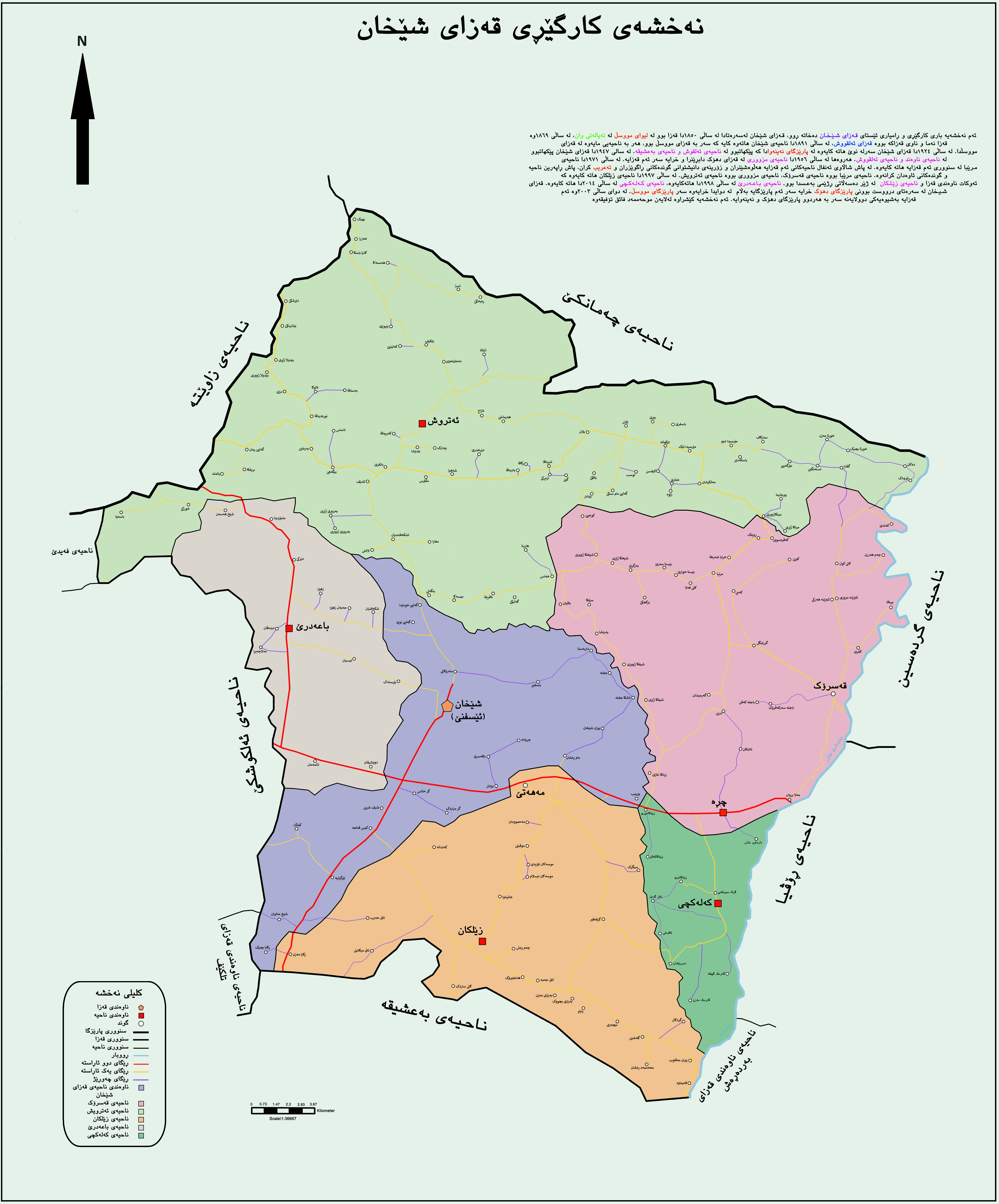
- Map of the district
- Country: Iraq
- Governorate: Nineveh Governorate (de jure), Duhok Governorate (de facto)
- founded: December 16, 1924
- Seat: Ain Sifni

Area
  - Total: 1,259 km^{2} (486 sq mi)

Population (2003)WFP program estimation
  - Total: 90,590
- Time zone: UTC+3 (AST)

The Shekhan District (Arabic: قضاء شيخان, Kurdish: قەزای شێخان, romanized: Qeza Şêxan) is a district in the Nineveh Governorate with its administrative centre at Ain Sifni. The district is disputed between Duhok Governorate and Nineveh Governorate, therefore it is one of the disputed territories of northern Iraq.

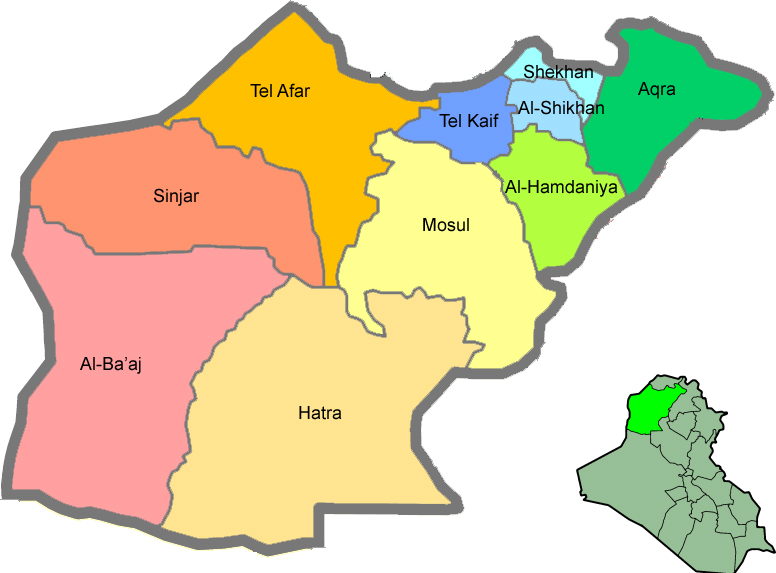
Shekhan District within Nineveh Governorate

It is bordered by the Amadiya and Dahuk Districts of the Dahuk Governorate to the north, the Akre District to the east, Al-Hamdaniya District to the south, and the Tel Kaif District to the west. Baadre, considered the political capital of the Yazidis, is also in this district.

== History ==
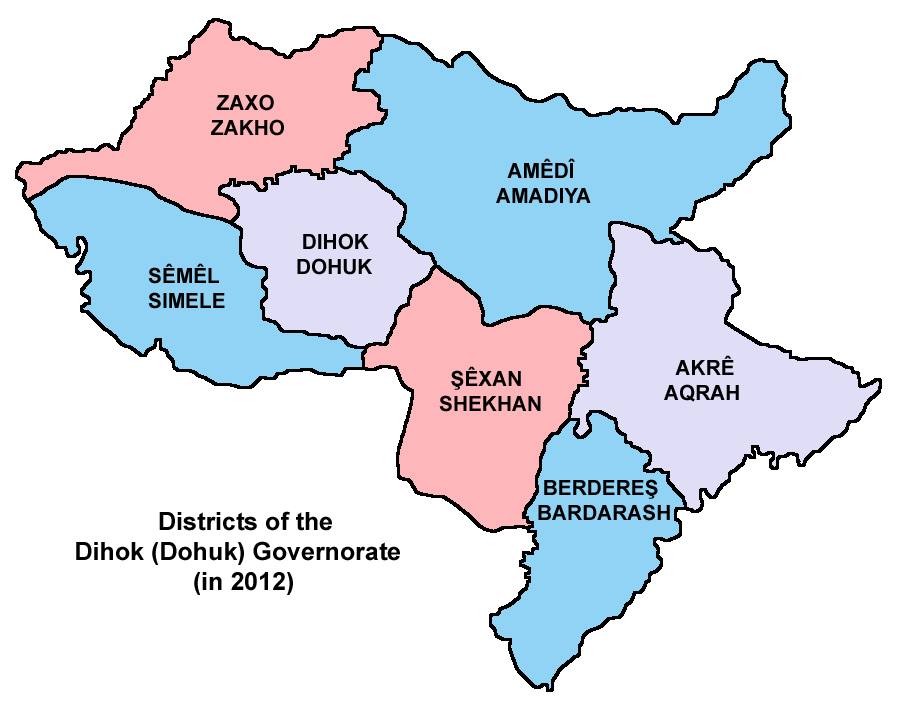
Duhok Governorate's district

The district's historical core corresponds to the former Dasin region, which was transformed into the Sheikhan principality following the arrival of Sheikh Adi ibn Musafir in the Lalish valley in the early 12th century. Following his death in 1162, his descendants combined spiritual and temporal authority, and from the late 13th century onward the resulting polity known as Sheikhan becomes increasingly identifiable in historical sources.

The Shekhan District was formed on December 16, 1924. After the 1935 Yazidi revolt, the district was placed under military control.

== Demographics ==
Historical population
Year	Pop.	±%
1977	36,427	—
1987	54,559	+49.8%
2003	90,590	+66.0%

It is mainly populated by Yazidis with a large Assyrian Christian minority.

== See also ==
- Assyrian homeland
- Proposals for Assyrian autonomy in Iraq
- List of Yazidi settlements
