= Sheikh Khairy Khedr =

Iraqi Yazidi militia commander (died 2014)

- Şêx Xêrî Xidir
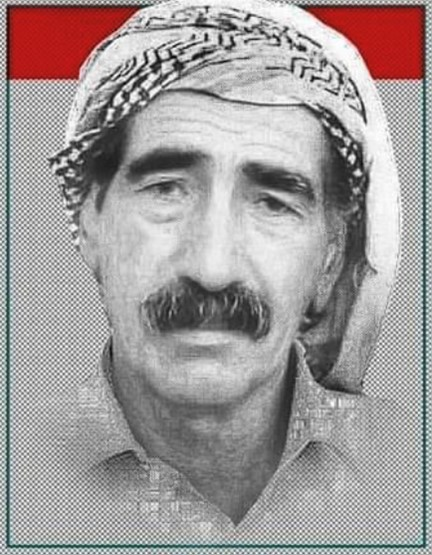
- Born: 1 July 1955; Sikkaniyah, Sinjar, Nineveh Governorate, Kingdom of Iraq
- Died: 22 October 2014 (aged 59); Sinjar Mountains, Sinjar, Nineveh Governorate, Iraq
- Cause of death: Mortar shrapnel wound
- Military career
- Allegiance: Tawûsî Melek Brigade (2007–2014); Sinjar Resistance Units (2014)
- Rank: Field commander
- Conflicts: War in Iraq (2013–2017); Northern Iraq offensive (August 2014); Sinjar massacre; December 2014 Sinjar offensive †

Sheikh Khairy Khedr (Kurdish: Şêx Xêrî Xidir; 1 July 1955 – 22 October 2014) was an Iraqi Yazidi commander from Sinjar who led Yazidi fighters against the Islamic State during the 2014 Sinjar massacre and the siege of the Sinjar Mountains that followed. After a wave of attacks on Yazidi communities in 2007, he founded and organised a small self-protection unit known in Kurdish as Tawûsî Melek Brigade (TMB), which became the first field command structure of the Sinjar Resistance Units (YBŞ) when it formed in 2014. Khedr was mortally wounded by Islamic State mortar fire on Mount Sinjar in October 2014.

== Early life ==
Khedr was born on 1 July 1955 in Sikkaniyah, a village south of the Sinjar Mountains into a Sheikh family from the Fexredîn lineage and belonging to the Qîranî tribe. He was a grandson of Sheikh Khedr (born 1909), described as the last overall chief of the Qîranî, after whose death the tribe split into several sections each led by its own mukhtar. Khedr's father was Murad, a son of Sheikh Khedr, and the family came to be known by the patronymic "Shekhdri" (from "Sheikh Khedr"), reflected in the name of Khedr's home village, Siba Sheikh Khidir, named after his grandfather.

He attended primary school in the village but did not finish his education because of his family's circumstances. As a young man Khedr opposed the Ba'athist government and was exiled to Syria, where he organised small guerrilla cells that carried out cross-border raids against Iraqi government forces. He returned to northern Iraq in 1991 and, after the fall of the Ba'athist government in 2003, settled back in Siba Sheikh Khidir, where he lived until the Islamic State's advance on Sinjar in 2014.

== Tawûsî Melek Brigade and the 2007 bombings ==
The town of Siba Sheikh Khidir lies about 20 kilometres south of the Sinjar Mountains. On 14 August 2007, two truck bombs detonated almost simultaneously in Siba Sheikh Khidir and the neighbouring village of Til Ezer, killing more than 500 people and wounding roughly 1,500 more. Most analysts attributed the attack to jihadist networks operating around Mosul. The bombings, among the deadliest attacks in modern Iraqi history, are remembered by Yazidis as the "73rd firman", part of a historical continuum of persecution of Yazidis.

In the aftermath, Khedr organised a small self-protection group known in Kurdish as Tawûsî Melek Brigade, named for the Yazidi Peacock Angel. The group was linked to the political structures of the Free Democratic Êzîdî Movement (Tevgera Azadiya Demokrat Êzîdiyan, TEV-DE), founded in 2004 and associated with the PKK.

When the Sinjar Resistance Units (Yekîneyên Berxwedana Şingal, YBŞ) were formally organised in August 2014, built around fighters the People's Protection Units (YPG) had begun training in Syria the previous month, Khedr became its first field commander, while Said Hassan Said served as overall commander responsible for the unit's political affairs.

== Sinjar massacre and the siege of the mountain ==
When Islamic State fighters attacked Sinjar on 3 August 2014, Peshmerga units guarding the district withdrew, and Yazidi fighters loyal to Khedr took up arms to defend their villages. Around Sikkaniyah, they held off the initial assault for more than four hours before running low on ammunition and falling back toward the mountains, having lost dozens of fighters, including nine members of Khedr's own family. Tens of thousands of Yazidi civilians and fighters became trapped on Mount Sinjar in the days that followed, marking the start of the genocide of Yazidis by the Islamic State.

On 7 August 2014, four days into the siege, Khedr was interviewed on the mountain by the Austrian political scientist Thomas Schmidinger. He described conditions as catastrophic, with tens of thousands of displaced people surviving on very little food or water in the summer heat, and said the elderly and sick were already dying. Asked whether the mountain could be held, Khedr said Islamic State fighters had not yet seriously attempted to take it directly, and that Yazidi fighters could defend it if adequately supplied; the greater problem, he said, was that the Peshmerga had withdrawn on 3 August with their weapons and equipment, leaving Yazidi fighters to rely on what arms they had themselves. He called the Peshmerga withdrawal a betrayal that Yazidis would not forget, and appealed for international military and humanitarian support, including food, water, ammunition, and air strikes on Islamic State positions.

According to some accounts, there were around a hundred Yazidi fighters on the Sinjar mountains when ISIS arrived, who split up into groups. Haydar Shesho and Qasim Shesho commanded one each. On the west of the mountain, there was a group led by Khedr. Khedr was described by fellow fighters as "very brave" and "like a gate". It was only after he had been killed that the jihadists were able to attack the mountain itself. His death was described as a heavy setback for the defenders.

On 21 October 2014, Islamic State forces seized additional territory north of the mountain, cutting one of the last escape routes to Kurdish-held territory and tightening the siege on those still trapped there.

== Death ==
Khedr was mortally wounded the following day, 22 October 2014, when an Islamic State mortar round struck his position on Mount Sinjar. The same round wounded a fellow fighter, Essa Abbas Hamo, and killed another man outright. Hamo, hit in the elbow by the same shrapnel that struck Khedr in the chest, later said Khedr concealed the extent of his own wound and insisted that Hamo be treated first. The only medical help on the mountain was a small tent staffed by volunteer medics, and Khedr bled to death before he could be brought to it, roughly five hours after he was hit. One of those medics, Saad Babir, recalled that fighters wept at the news and vowed the resistance would continue in Khedr's name.

Press reports from 24 October likewise listed Khedr among prominent Sinjar commanders killed as Islamic State fighters seized the nearby towns of Hatin, Duhla, and Burk. A separate Yazidi account, published years afterward by a relative of another fighter on the mountain, dates Khedr's death to 21 October and describes his body being carried to the village of Karsi before being flown by helicopter to Sheikhan district the next day. It adds that his brother, Majdal Sheikh Khedr, took over command of the Sikkaniyah position afterward.

Following Khedr's death, Mazlum Şingalî succeeded him as YBŞ field commander.

== Legacy ==
Khedr's death was described by those who fought alongside him as a severe blow to morale on Mount Sinjar, coming as the siege was tightening and outside help remained scarce. He is remembered in Yazidi accounts of the genocide as one of the community's earliest and most prominent armed defenders, and continues to be commemorated in Yazidi community on the anniversaries of his death.

Khedr was buried at Lalish sanctuary, the holiest site in Yazidism, where his grave continues to be visited as he is considered a heroic figure.

== See also ==
- Sinjar Resistance Units
- Genocide of Yazidis by the Islamic State
- Haydar Shesho
- Qasim Shesho

== Sources ==
- Schmidinger, Thomas (2022) [First published in German 2019 as Die Welt Hat Uns Vergessen (Vienna: Mandelbaum Verlag)]. The World Has Forgotten Us: Sinjar and the Islamic State's Genocide of the Yezidis. Translated by Schiffmann, Michael. London: Pluto Press. ISBN 978-0-7453-4606-9.
- "Yazidi militia claims to have killed at least 22 Islamic State militants". Haaretz. 22 August 2014.
- "Yazidi 'King Peacock' Militia 'Kills 22 Isis Militants in Sinjar'". International Business Times UK. 21 August 2014.
- "Iraqi army bombs Daesh positions to help Yazidis". Gulf News. 24 October 2014.
- Su, Alice (4 November 2014). "No Escape From Sinjar Mountain". Foreign Policy.
- Khatari, Daoud Murad (28 June 2019). "الشهامة والأشقاء الثلاثة" [The Chivalry and the Three Brothers]. Bahzani.net (in Arabic).
- "السيرة الذاتية للقائد الأيزيدي الشهيد الشيخ خيري" [Biography of the martyred Yazidi commander Sheikh Khairy]. Zewa News (in Arabic). 22 October 2023.
- Alo, Murad Suleiman (19 April 2020). "(الشيخ خدر رئيس عشيرة القيران الأخير)" [Sheikh Khedr, last chief of the Qairan tribe]. Sot Kurdistan (in Arabic).
