= Sarbast Babiri =

Kurdistan Democratic Party official and Peshmerga commander in Sinjar

- سه‌ربەست جەمیل موراد
- Born: 1959 (age 66–67); Dohuk, Iraq
- Military career
- Allegiance: Kurdistan Democratic Party
- Branch: Peshmerga
- Rank: Commander
- Commands: Branch 17 (Liq 17), Sinjar
- Conflicts: Northern Iraq offensive (August 2014); Sinjar massacre

Sarbast Babiri (Kurdish: Serbest Cemîl Murad; also transliterated Sarbast Bapir, Serbest Bapeiri, or Serbest Bapiri; born 1959) is an Iraqi Kurdish politician and former Peshmerga commander known primarily for his role in the withdrawal of Kurdish forces from Sinjar on 3 August 2014, immediately before Islamic State fighters entered the district and the Yazidi genocide began.

At the time, Babiri headed Branch 17 (Liq/Laq 17) of the Kurdistan Democratic Party (KDP) in Sinjar, the party's chief local command centre and the seat of ultimate authority over security in the district. According to academic, journalistic, and eyewitness reports, in this role he repeatedly declined Yazidi requests to arm a local volunteer defence force in the weeks before the attack, assuring Yazidi representatives that the Peshmerga would defend the district instead, but as the Islamic State's assault began, he was among the first KDP officials to leave Sinjar, ahead of the Peshmerga withdrawal and most of the civilian population.

== Early life and career ==
According to Partipedia, an official biographical encyclopedia maintained by the KDP's Encyclopedia Committee, Babiri was born Serbest Cemîl Murad in 1959 in Dohuk and he joined the KDP in 1976, during the party's provisional leadership period, and joined the ranks of the Kurdistan Peshmerga forces in 1980. He was a delegate to the party's 10th (1989), 11th (1993), and 12th (1999) congresses, and took part in the March 1991 uprising in Iraqi Kurdistan. He became commander of the "Spîlk" unit, under the Soran regional command of the Peshmerga general command, in 2007, and was elected a reserve member of the KDP Leadership Council at the party's 13th Congress in 2010.

== Control of security in Sinjar ==
According to historian Matthew Barber, security in the Sinjar region had been controlled by the KDP since the fall of Saddam Hussein in 2003 through a hierarchical "party centre system" of laq (branch), lijne, and rêkxraw offices, which doubled as barracks for armed personnel and served as the district's true centre of political, security, and economic power, alongside its role in providing party patronage. Barber writes that Sinjar's single laq, numbered 17 and based in Sinjar City, was "the seat of this power," and that its head in 2014 was Babiri, whom Barber identifies as Muslim Kurdish; Barber separately notes that top security and administrative positions in Sinjar were consistently held by Muslim Kurds rather than by Yazidis, the district's majority population. According to Barber, Babiri "was ultimately responsible for all security" in Sinjar, and the Peshmerga generals responsible for troops in the district at the time were, like Babiri, all Muslim Kurdish rather than Yazidi or local to Sinjar.

Barber's account states that in June 2014, following the collapse of the Iraqi Army in Nineveh after the Islamic State's capture of Mosul, KDP secret police and Peshmerga forces disarmed Yazidi soldiers returning to Sinjar from disbanded Iraqi army units, reducing the population's capacity for self-defence. Separately, Barber writes that Branch 17 directed the disarming of the Iraqi army's retreating 11th and 10th Brigades, whose personnel were required to surrender their weapons, equipment, vehicles, and uniforms at Branch 17's headquarters in Sinjar city before continuing on to Baghdad in civilian clothing. Barber concludes that Babiri thereby "presided over substantial acquisitions of new weaponry" for security and military forces in Sinjar in the weeks before the attack.

== Role before the attack ==
According to political scientist Hawre Hasan Hama, interviewing Haydar Shesho, then a Patriotic Union of Kurdistan (PUK) member of the Iraqi parliament and a Yazidi militia organizer, Shesho, together with his uncle Qasim Shesho and other Yazidi representatives, asked Babiri, as chairman of the KDP's Sinjar branch, for permission to form a local Yazidi volunteer defence force some weeks before the August 2014 attack; in Shesho's account, Babiri declined, saying that the roughly 11,000 Peshmerga stationed in the district would defend the population if attacked.

According to political scientist Thomas Schmidinger, after the partial dissolution of the Iraqi army in June 2014, Shesho gathered some 3,500 registered Yazidi volunteers intending to support the Peshmerga in defending Sinjar, but the Peshmerga and the KDP leadership under Babiri, whom Schmidinger identifies as a Sunni Muslim party official from Dohuk, prevented Shesho and other Yazidi men from arming and organising themselves, while KDP security forces separately confiscated most of the weapons Yazidi men had brought back from disbanded army units, an estimated 80 percent by Shesho's account. In another interview by Schmidinger, Shesho gives a first-person account of presenting Babiri with the list of over 3,500 volunteers in July 2014, together with Qasim Shesho. Babiri refused on the grounds that Sinjar's defence was the sole task of the Peshmerga, and separately objected that the list registered volunteers for the defence of Yazidis specifically rather than "the people of Sinjar" as a whole. Shesho states that Peshmerga forces subsequently set up checkpoints throughout Sinjar to search returning Yazidi soldiers and confiscate their weapons, and that Yazidi representatives repeatedly, unsuccessfully asked the Peshmerga to leave the men their weapons for self-defence.

An investigative account published by the Yazidi outlet ÊzîdîPress in August 2015, based on named eyewitnesses and interviews reported that Branch 17 under Babiri declined to arm the Yazidi volunteers on the stated grounds that the unit would be "a pure Yezidi but not a Kurdish one," and states that Yazidi soldiers who had left Iraqi army service to help defend Sinjar asked to return the weapons the Peshmerga had confiscated from them, a request that Babiri and other commanders again rejected. The same account states that the total figure of roughly 11,000 Peshmerga deployed in and around Sinjar originated with Babiri himself.

== Withdrawal of 3 August 2014 ==
In an interview by Hawre Hasan Hama, Shesho testified that as the Islamic State's attack began, he repeatedly telephoned Babiri and Said Kestayi, commander of the KDP's Force 80 Peshmerga, requesting reinforcements, and was repeatedly told help was on its way. In Shesho's words, as quoted, "hundreds of people were killed" while the roughly 11,000 Peshmerga in the area "abandoned the defense of Shingal without one bullet."

According to testimony from an interview with Shesho: Qasim Shesho called Babiri roughly every 30 minutes over about three hours, from around 3 a.m. to 6 a.m. on 3 August, as the village of Ger Zerek came under attack some 15 kilometres from Sinjar City, each time being told Peshmerga reinforcements were on their way. No reinforcements came; at around 5:30 a.m. the village's defenders, left with only light weapons, sent the women and children to the mountain while continuing to fight, and 40 to 50 of the village's defenders were killed. Qasim Shesho then confronted Babiri in Sinjar City, where Babiri said he had "not got the permission to send" reinforcements and ordered Qasim to leave with the withdrawing Peshmerga; Qasim refused and remained. In this account, local collaborators are said to have taken over Sinjar's administrative offices before the Peshmerga had even completed their withdrawal, without resistance from the Peshmerga forces still present. The same interview recounts that later that day, Haydar Shesho travelled toward Sinjar and encountered large numbers of withdrawing Peshmerga on the roads. Arriving in the still-untouched town of Sinûnê around 2 p.m., with no Islamic State fighters yet visible, Shesho found Peshmerga and police forces still present but preparing to leave; when asked why, they said they were simply waiting for orders from Babiri and other Peshmerga leaders.

Yazidi defenders in the villages of Siba Sheikh Khidr and Ger Zerek reported being in repeated telephone contact with Branch 17 and Peshmerga commanders through the early morning of 3 August, being told each time that reinforcements were about to arrive, while in fact "not a single Peshmerga" had been dispatched. The same account states that hours before the attack, on 3 August, Babiri told the Kurdish outlet Waar that Sinjar's security situation was "stable" and that "all external borders" had been secured; and that, according to multiple eyewitnesses cited in the report, Babiri had already left Sinjar City for the mountains before Islamic State fighters reached the city or most civilians were aware of the unfolding withdrawal.

The Peshmerga withdrawal, which encompassed virtually all KDP-affiliated security and military personnel in Sinjar, was ordered from Erbil and was, in most cases, conducted without any defensive engagement of Islamic State forces. Babiri is reported to have been "one of the first to flee" once the jihadist advance became known but before the attack itself began, and KDP forces is reported to uniformly have refused Yazidi requests, made in numerous towns as Peshmerga withdrew, to leave weapons behind for civilian self-defence. According to journalist Christine van den Toorn's reporting in The Daily Beast, Babiri had appeared in KDP media and on Facebook in the preceding weeks, posing with weapons and pledging that Sinjar would be defended "until the last drop of blood," but that he was among the first KDP officials to leave the district, departing the night before the assault in a single vehicle after hearing that Islamic State fighters were approaching the villages of Sibaya and Tel Banat; van den Toorn's sources placed him waiting at the Tirbka checkpoint north of the mountain, near the Syrian border, the following morning.

== Survivor testimony ==
In testimony given to the UK Parliament on 15 March 2016 and published in English translation by ÊzîdîPress, the sixteen year old Yazidi genocide survivor Salwa Khalaf Rasho stated that as she and her family attempted to flee toward Mount Sinjar on the morning of 3 August 2014, they were first blocked by a Peshmerga checkpoint, and that after taking an alternate route, "a convoy of Peshmerga together with its commander, Sarbast Bapiri, and his soldiers pointed their guns at us and threatened us," ordering them to clear the way so the convoy could pass first; she stated that a vehicle in the convoy subsequently broke down and blocked the road, causing a traffic jam during which Islamic State fighters reached and captured her family. Rasho was subsequently enslaved by the Islamic State for eight months before escaping.

== Response ==
Van den Toorn reported that Babiri and other local KDP officials defended their conduct by describing their forces as "ill prepared, under-supplied and under-staffed," and that Babiri told a Kurdish publication the fall of Sinjar was not his fault, saying he had requested additional weapons and support in the preceding weeks but that his requests had been denied by his superiors.

Masoud Barzani formed a committee in 2015 to investigate the withdrawal. In a letter published by the Kurdish daily al-Ra'i al-Am, reported by Middle East Eye, Barzani stated that "all the political, security and military officials responsible" for the withdrawal had been "relieved of their positions," and that they had been referred to a board of inquiry, as well as stating “what happened in Sinjar did not happen to the Yazidis alone; it is an injury that has hurt us all. Those officials should not have withdrawn; they should have sacrificed themselves in defence of the region.”

After the Peshmerga's withdrawal, some officials suggested that the withdrawal from Sinjar, which left tens of thousands of Yazidis stranded in the face of the Islamic state advance, had been a tactical decision.However, this was strongly denied by a Peshmerga general, Halgurd Hikmat, who stated “there was categorically no order to withdraw from any front. There was negligence.”

An ÊzîdîPress investigative account gives further detail consistent with this: it reports that Babiri, together with Peshmerga commander Said Kestayi and Asayish official Shawkat Doski, was placed under house arrest at a hotel in Pirmam and released a few days later.

== See also ==
- Yazidi genocide
- Sinjar massacre
- Kocho massacre
- Peshmerga
- Persecution of Yazidis
- Qasim Shesho
- Haydar Shesho
