= Dalal Khario =

- Born: 1997 (age 28–29); Hardan, Iraq
- Citizenship: Iraq, Germany
- Occupations: Author, human rights activist
- Writing career
- Pen name: Shirin
- Years active: 2016–present
- Genres: Memoir, Human rights, Activism
- Subjects: Yazidism, Women's rights, ISIS captivity
- Notable work: I Remain a Daughter of the Light
- Notable awards: Women's Rights Award (2017)

Dalal Khario (born c. 1997) is a Yazidi woman from northern Iraq who fled to Germany after escaping from ISIS.

On August 3, 2014, ISIS fighters conquered Sinjar and its surrounding villages around the Sinjar Mountains including Khario's native village of Hardan. Khario, then 17 years old, was abducted and spent nine months in captivity. She was forced to marry nine different men and was raped repeatedly. Khario was one of many young Yazidi women abducted by ISIS; an estimated 4,000 women and children are still being held hostage. Khario's hometown of Hardan has been destroyed, and the bodies of 500 residents have been found in mass graves. Her family has been torn apart: her mother was taken by ISIS militants to Raqqa in Syria, her younger sister is still missing, and her brother is dead.

Khario's memoir, I Remain a Daughter of the Light (German: Ich bleibe eine Tocher des Lichts), was published in 2016 under the pseudonym "Shirin." In February 2017, she received the Women's Rights Award at the 9th annual Geneva Summit for Human Rights and Democracy. She said later that the experience was bittersweet because her mother and sister could not be there with her.

== See also ==
- Farida Khalaf
- Nadia Murad
- Lamiya Haji Bashar
