= Yezidi genocide =

2014-2017 genocide campaign by the Islamic State

- Part of the War in Iraq (2013–2017), Syrian civil war, and religious persecution by ISIS
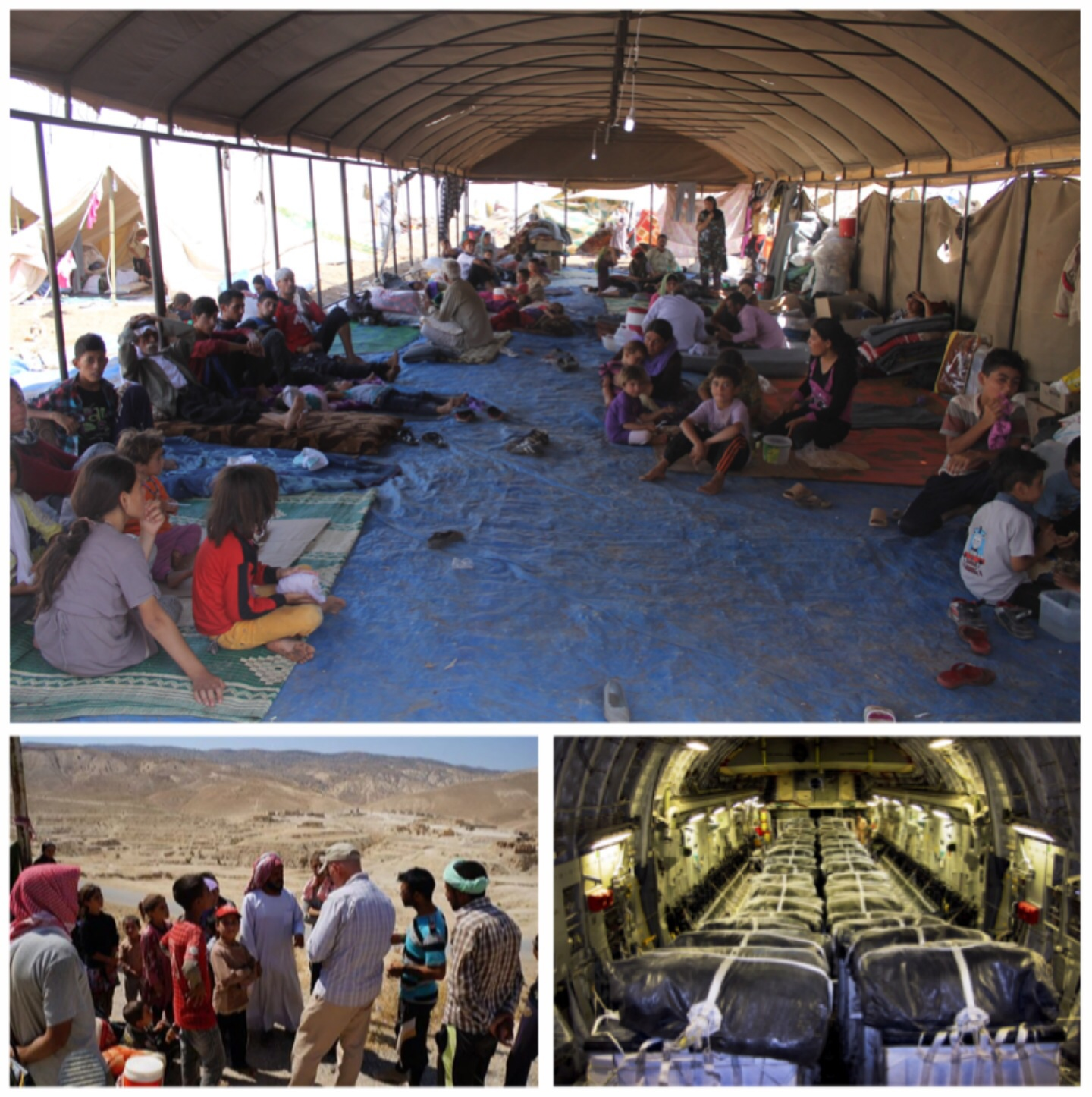
- Left-to-right from top: Yazidi refugees receiving support from the International Rescue Committee; American relief worker of USAID conversing with Iraqi locals near Sinjar; packaged bundles of water inside of a C-17 Globemaster III prior to an emergency airdrop by the United States Air Force.
- Location: Iraq and Syria
- Date: June 2014 – December 2017
- Target: Yezidis
- Attack type: Genocidal massacre; genocidal rape and sexual slavery of women and girls; and forced conversion to Islam
- Deaths: ~5,000 in 2014 (per the United Nations)
- Injuries: Unknown
- Victims: 4,200–10,800 kidnapped or captive and 500,000+ displaced
- Perpetrator: Islamic State
- Defenders: Peshmerga; Iraqi Armed Forces; CJTF–OIR; Kurdistan Workers' Party; People's Protection Units; Women's Protection Units; Sinjar Alliance

The Yezidi genocide also known as the 74th firman by Yezidis, (Note: Often spelt "Yazidi". particularly by news sources.) was perpetrated by the Islamic State in Iraq and Syria between 2014 and 2017. It was characterized by massacres, genocidal rape, and forced conversions to Islam. The Yezidis are a Kurdish-speaking group who are indigenous to Kurdistan and who practice Yezidism.

Over a period of three years, Islamic State militants trafficked thousands of Yezidi women and girls and killed thousands of Yezidi men. The United Nations reported that the Islamic State killed about 5,000 Yezidis and trafficked about 10,800 Yezidi women and girls in a "forced conversion campaign" throughout Iraq. By 2015, upwards of 71% of the global Yezidi population had been displaced by the genocide, with most Yezidi refugees having fled to Iraq's Kurdistan Region and Syria's Rojava. The persecution of Yezidis, along with other religious minorities, took place after the Islamic State's Northern Iraq offensive of June 2014.

Amid numerous atrocities committed by the Islamic State, the Yezidi genocide attracted international attention and prompted the United States to establish CJTF–OIR, a military coalition consisting of many Western countries and Turkey, Morocco, and Jordan. Additionally, the United States, the United Kingdom, and Australia made emergency airdrops to support Yezidi refugees who were trapped in the Sinjar Mountains due to the Islamic State's Northern Iraq offensive of August 2014. During the Sinjar massacre, in which the Islamic State killed and abducted thousands of trapped Yezidis, the United States and the United Kingdom began carrying out airstrikes on the advancing Islamic State militants, while the People's Defense Units and the Kurdistan Workers' Party jointly formed a humanitarian corridor to evacuate the rest of the Yezidi refugees from the Sinjar Mountains.

The United Nations and several other organizations, including the Council of Europe and the European Union, have designated the anti-Yezidi campaign by the Islamic State as a genocide, as have the United States, Canada, Armenia, and Iraq.

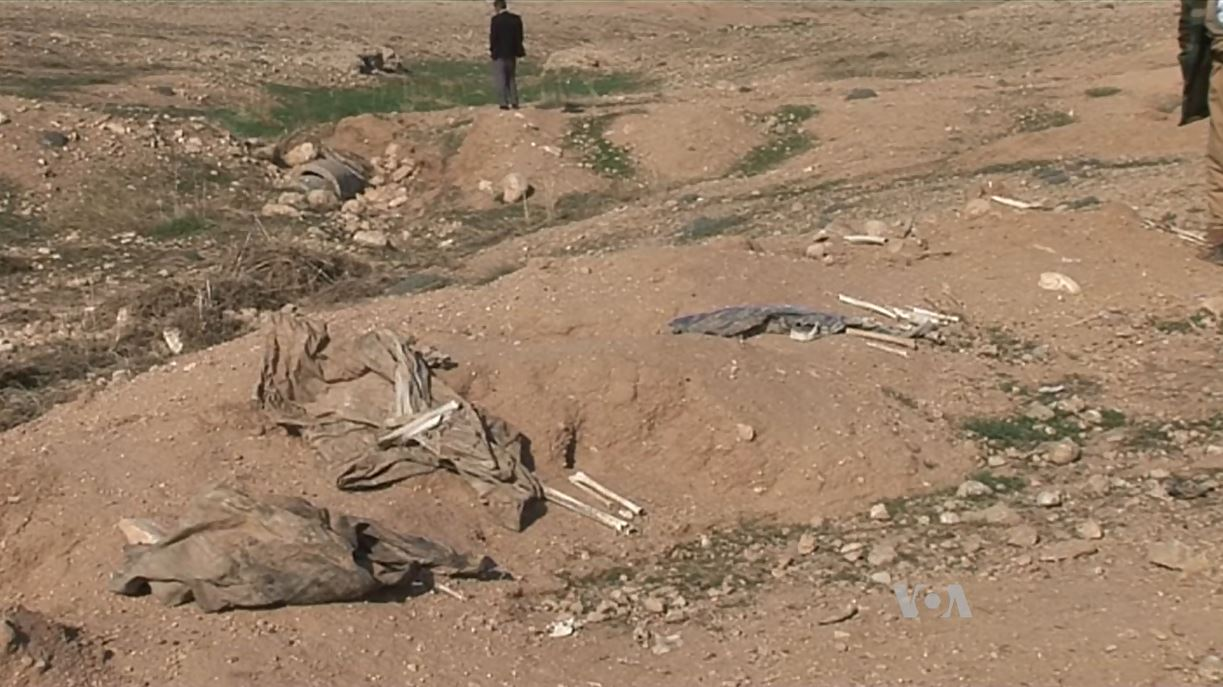
A Yezidi mass grave in the Sinjar region in 2015

== Background ==
=== Yezidis and the Yezidi religion ===
The Yezidis are indigenous to Kurdistan and practice Yezidism, an Iranian ethnoreligion derived from the Indo-Iranian tradition. They are monotheists who worship Melek Taus, a benevolent angel who appears as a peacock. The Islamic State (IS) and some other Muslims in the region view the peacock angel as the malevolent creature Lucifer or Shaitan and they consider the Yezidis 'devil worshippers'. IS does not consider Yezidis as People of the Book or eligible for Dhimmi and related protections; which Islam offers to a wide variety of minority religions. The Yezidi community historically recorded their persecution; the persecution by the Islamic State is considered their 74th genocide.

=== Persecution of Yezidis ===
==== During the Ottoman period ====
- In 1640, 40,000 Ottoman soldiers attacked Yezidi communities around Mount Sinjar, killing 3,060 Yezidis in battle, then raiding and setting fire to 300 Yezidi villages and murdering 1,000–2,000 Yezidis who had taken refuge in caves around the town of Sinjar;
- in 1832–1834, the Sunni Kurdish emir Mir Muhammad of Rawanduz launched a genocidal campaign, known Firmana Mîrê Kore, against Yezidis in the Sheikhan and Sinjar regions of present-day northern Iraq. Triggered by religious fatwas declaring Yezidis as infidels and fueled by intertribal conflict, the campaign resulted in mass killing, enslavement, and forced conversion across Yezidi settlements. It is considered the bloodiest event in recorded Yezidi history, with estimates of between 70,000 and 135,000 Yezidis killed and survivors numbering only around 5% of the targeted population.
- in 1892, Sultan Abdulhamid II ordered a campaign of mass conscription or murder of Yezidis as part of his campaign to Islamize the Ottoman Empire, which also targeted Armenians and other Christians.

==== In post-2003 Iraq ====
- In April 2007, a bus in Mosul was hijacked. Muslims and Christians were told to get off, while the remaining 23 Yezidi passengers were driven to an eastern Mosul location and murdered.
- In August 2007, two Yezidi communities, in Qahtaniyah (just south of Sinjar) and Jazeera (Siba Sheikh Khidir), near Mosul, were hit by a total of four vehicle bombs carrying two tons of explosives, leaving 336–500 dead and 1,500 injured. Perpetrators are unknown; the U.S. saw "al-Qaeda as the prime suspect" because of the scale and the co-ordinated nature of the bombings.

== Rise of the Islamic State ==
=== Offensive into Kurdish-controlled Iraq ===
On 3 August 2014, IS militants attacked and took over Sinjar in northern Iraq, a Kurdish-controlled town that was predominantly inhabited by Yezidis, and the surrounding area.

Yezidis, and internet postings of IS, have reported summary executions that day by IS militants, leading to 200,000 civilians fleeing Sinjar, of whom around 50,000 Yezidis were reportedly escaping to the nearby Sinjar Mountains. They were trapped on Mount Sinjar, surrounded by IS militants and facing starvation and dehydration.

On 4 August 2014, Prince Tahseen Said, Emir of the Yezidi, issued a plea to world leaders calling for assistance on behalf of the Yezidi facing attack from IS.

=== Massacres of Yezidis ===
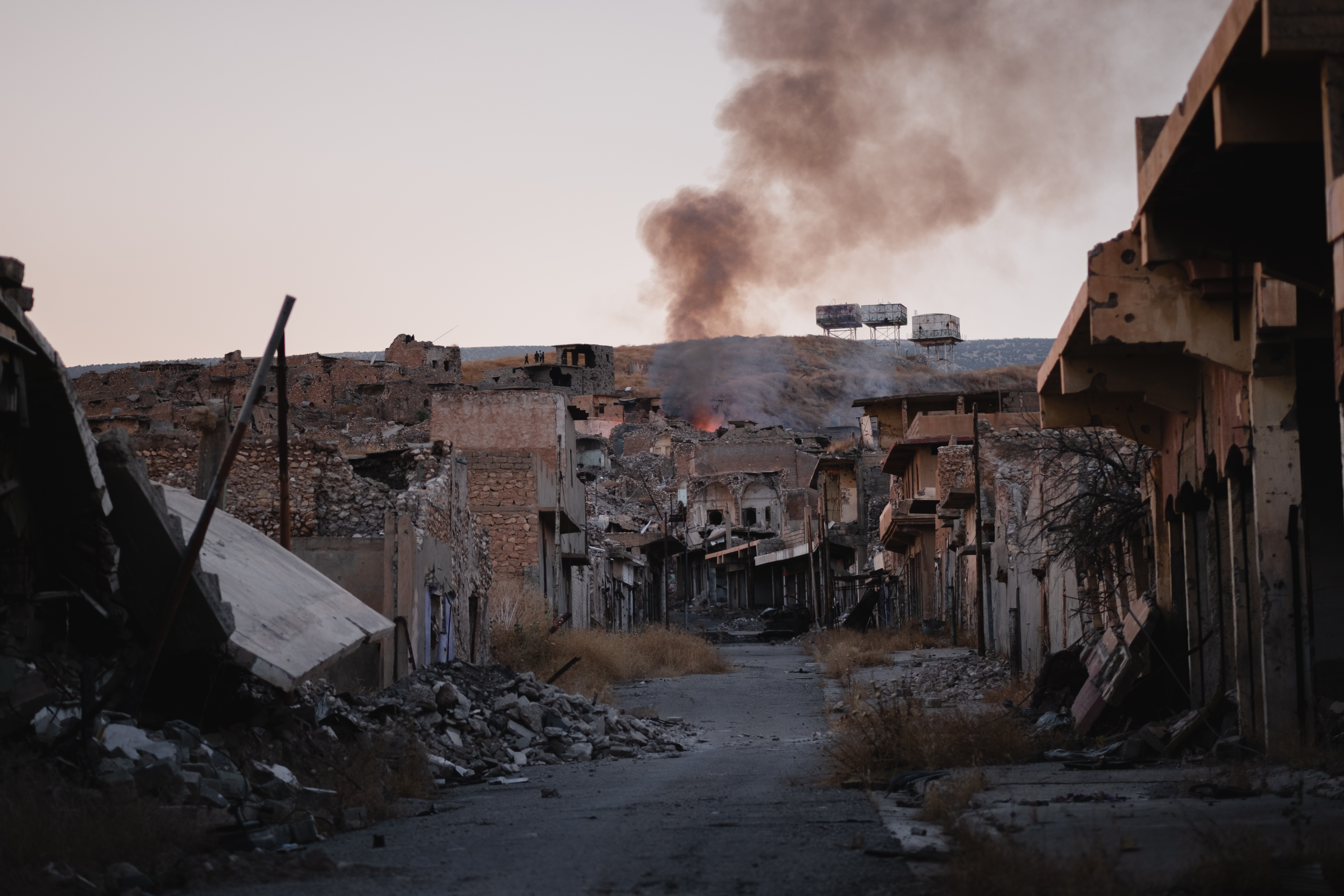
The ruins of Sinjar in July 2019 after the invasion of the Islamic State

On 3 August 2014, IS killed the men from the al-Qahtaniya area, ten Yezidi families fleeing were attacked by IS; and IS shot 70 to 90 Yezidi men in Qiniyeh village.

On 4 August, IS fighters attacked Jabal Sinjar, and killed 30 Yezidi men; 60 more Yezidi men were killed in the village of Hardan. On the same day, Yezidi community leaders stated that at least 200 Yezidis had been killed in Sinjar (see Sinjar massacre), and 60–70 near Ramadi Jabal. According to reports from surviving Yezidis, between 3 and 6 August, more than 50 Yezidi were killed near Dhola village, 100 in Khana Sor village, 250–300 in Hardan area, more than 200 on the road between Adnaniya and Jazeera, dozens near al-Shimal village, and on the road from Matu village to Jabal Sinjar.

On 10 August, according to statements by the Iraqi government, IS militants buried alive an undefined number of Yezidi women and children in northern Iraq in an attack that killed 500 people. Those who escaped across the Tigris River into Kurdish-controlled areas of Syria on 10 August gave accounts of how they had seen individuals also attempting to flee who later died.

On 15 August, in the village of Kojo, south of Sinjar, after more than 300 Yezidi families had received the ultimatum to convert to Sunni Islam or be killed, over 80 men were killed. A witness recounted that the villagers were first converted under duress, but when the village elder refused to convert, all of the men were taken in trucks under the pretext of being led to Sinjar and gunned down along the way. According to reports from survivors interviewed by OHCHR, on 15 August, the entire male population of the Yezidi village of Khocho, up to 400 men, were rounded up and shot by IS, and up to 1,000 women and children were abducted; on the same day, up to 200 Yezidi men were reportedly executed for refusing conversion in a Tal Afar prison.

Between 24 and 25 August 14 elderly Yezidi men were executed by IS in the Sheikh Mand Shrine, and the Jidala village Yezidi shrine was blown up. On 1 September, the Yezidi villages of Kotan, Hareko and Kharag Shafrsky were set afire by IS, and on 9 September, Peshmerga fighters discovered a mass grave containing the bodies of 14 executed civilians, presumably Yezidis.

According to an OHRCR/UNAMI report on 26 September, by the end of August, 1,600–1,800 or more Yezidis who had been murdered, executed, or died from starvation. In early October, Matthew Barber, a scholar of Yezidi history at the University of Chicago, estimated that 5,000 Yezidi men had been killed by IS.

According to the United Nations, IS had massacred 5,000 Yezidi men and kidnapped about 7000 Yezidi women and girls (who were forced into sex slavery) in northern Iraq in August 2014.

In May 2015, the Yezidi Progress Party released a statement in which they said that 300 Yezidi captives were killed on 1 May by IS in the Tal Afar, Iraq.

A 2017 survey by the PLOS Medicine journal significantly decreased the number of Yezidis killed however concurrently raised the number abducted with 2,100 to 4,400 deaths and 4,200 to 10,800 abductions.

== Violence against Yezidi women and girls ==
=== Rape and sexual slavery ===
The 2017 report of the United Nations Secretary-General on conflict-related sexual violence detailed the brutal attacks on Mosul, Sinjar, Tall'Afar, and the Ninewa plains in the north and subjection of civilians to sexual violence on a horrific scale primarily against women and girls from ethnic and religious minority groups. According to declarations, 971 Yezidi women and girls have been freed while 1,882 remained enslaved in Iraq and Syria. Forced transfer of Yezidis from Mosul to Raqqah (Syria), trafficking, the sale and trade of women and children, and the use of sexually enslaved women as human shields by IS during the Mosul operations were also reported.

==== Abductions ====
On 3 August, IS abducted women and children from the al-Qahtaniya area, and 450–500 abducted Yezidi women and girls were taken to Tal Afar; hundreds more to Si Basha Khidri and then Ba'aj. When IS fighters attacked Jabal Sinjar on 4 August, they abducted a number of women in the Yezidi village of Hardan, wives and daughters were abducted; other Yezidi women were abducted in other villages in the area. On 6 August, IS kidnapped 400 Yezidi women in Sinjar to sell them as sex slaves. According to reports from surviving Yezidi, between 3 and 6 August 500 Yezidi women and children were abducted from Ba'aj and more than 200 from Tal Banat. According to a statement by the Iraqi government on 10 August 2014, hundreds of women were taken as slaves in northern Iraq. On 15 August, in the Yezidi village of Kojo, south of Sinjar, over 100 women were abducted, though according to some reports from survivors, up to 1,000 women and children of the Yezidi village of Khocho were abducted. According to an OHRCR/UNAMI report on 26 September, by the end of August up to 2,500 Yezidis, mostly women and children, had been abducted.

The abducted Yezidi women were sold into slave markets with IS "using rape as a weapon of war" according to CNN, with the group having gynaecologists ready to examine the captives. Yezidi women were physically observed, including examinations to see if they were virgins or if they were pregnant. Women who were found to be pregnant were taken by the IS gynaecologists and forced abortions were performed on them.

==== Sex trafficking ====
Haleh Esfandiari, a professor at the Woodrow Wilson International Center for Scholars, highlighted the abuse of local women by IS militants after they captured an area. "They usually take the older women to a makeshift slave market and try to sell them. The younger girls ... are raped or married off to fighters", she said, adding, "It's based on temporary marriages, and once these fighters have had sex with these young girls, they just pass them on to other fighters."

Speaking about Yezidi women who were captured by IS, Nazand Begikhani said in October 2014, "These women have been treated like cattle ... They have been subjected to physical and sexual violence, including systematic rape and sex slavery. They've been exposed in markets in Mosul and in Raqqa, Syria, carrying price tags." Yezidi girls in Iraq allegedly raped by IS fighters have committed suicide by jumping to their death from Mount Sinjar, as described in a witness statement.

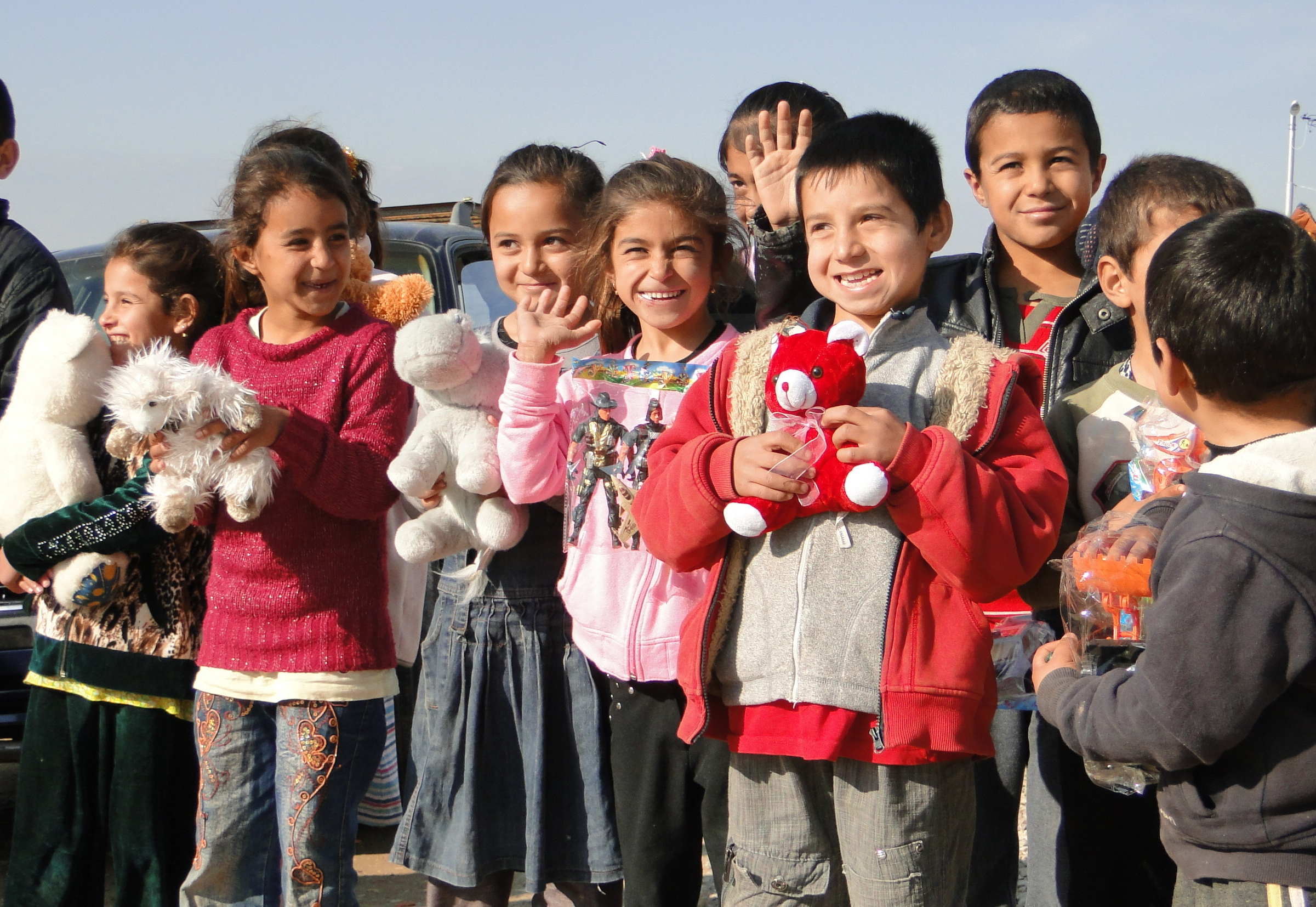
Defend International provided humanitarian aid to Yezidi refugees in Iraqi Kurdistan in December 2014.

A United Nations report issued on 2 October 2014, based on 500 interviews with witnesses, said that IS took 450–500 women and girls to Iraq's Nineveh region in August where "150 unmarried girls and women, predominantly from the Yezidi and Christian communities, were reportedly transported to Syria, either to be enslaved to IS fighters as a 'reward' or to be sold as sex slaves". Also in October 2014, a UN report revealed that IS had detained 5,000 to 7,000 Yezidi women as slaves or forced brides in northern Iraq in August 2014.

On 4 November 2014, Dr. Widad Akrawi of Defend International said that "the international community should define what's happening to the Yezidis as a crime against humanity, crime against cultural heritage of the region and ethnic cleansing", adding that Yezidi females are being "subjected to as systematic gender-based violence and the use of slavery and rape as a weapon of war." A month earlier, President of Defend International dedicated her 2014 International Pfeffer Peace Award to the Yezidis, Christians and all residents of Kobane because, she said, facts on the ground demonstrate that these peaceful people are not safe in their enclaves, partly because of their ethnic origin and/or religion and they are therefore in urgent need for immediate attention from the global community. She asked the international community to make sure that the victims are not forgotten; they should be rescued, protected, fully assisted and compensated fairly.

In June 2017, reports from Vian Dakhil of the Iraqi parliament told of a captured sex slave being fed her own one-year-old child. The woman was starved for three days in a cellar and was finally given a meal by her captors. When finished, they said "We cooked your one-year-old son that we took from you, and this is what you just ate".

A young woman described her experience in a 2023 documentary Daughters of the Sun: "A man bought me. He was an Iraqi, from Til Afar. He was 24 years old ... I was his slave and had to take care of his children. He hit me all the time. I was with that family for three years. Not a day went by when he didn't hit me. Most of the time I couldn't see because my eyes were swollen."

==== Process of selling Yezidi and Christian women ====
On 3 November 2014, the "price list" for Yezidi and Christian females issued by IS surfaced online, and Dr. Widad Akrawi and her team were the first to verify the authenticity of the document. On 4 November 2014, a translated version of the document was shared by Akrawi. On 4 August 2015, the same document was confirmed as genuine by a UN official.

Writing in mid 2016, Lori Hinnant, Maya Alleruzzo and Balint Szlanko of the Associated Press reported that IS tightened "its grip on the estimated 3,000 women and girls held as sex slaves" even while it was losing territory to Iraqi forces. IS sold the women on encrypted smart phone apps, primarily on Telegram and on Facebook" and to a lesser degree on WhatsApp. In advertisements for the girls seen by AP, "many of the women and girls are dressed in finery, some in heavy makeup. All look directly at the camera, standing in front of overstuffed chairs or brocade curtains in what resembles a shabby hotel ballroom. Some are barely out of elementary school. Not one looks older than 30. In the documentary "Daughters of the Sun," Yezidi women describe the selling process: "Price tags were put on us. They bought us for 10 dollars, 20 dollars, some for 100 dollars, or as a gift....[I was sold] five times."

==== Pregnancies ====
Various forms of reproductive violence were enacted against the Yezidi women and children to prevent birth. Captured Yezidis were taken as slaves and forced to use contraceptive pills and injections, and those captured pregnant were victims of forced abortions. Reports covered that Yezidi women and girls were told that they had to abort their previous unborn children since IS fighters were interested only in making Muslim babies. Forced impregnation with the intent to prevent the birth of Yezidi babies is also another form of reproductive violence and a measure taken against the group. These destructive intents and acts are described as preventing future procreation and causing severe long-term physical, psychological, and socio-political effects.

=== Escape and liberation ===
Since 2014, efforts have been ongoing to rescue those enslaved by the Islamic State, including paying ransoms. Many were freed by the Syrian Democratic Forces as they took territory from the Islamic State in the Rojava–Islamist conflict. In November 2014 The New York Times reported on the accounts given by five who escaped the Islamic State of their captivity and abuse.

According to Mirza Dinnayi, founder of the German-Iraqi aid organization Luftbrücke Irak, IS registers "every slave, every person under their owner, and therefore if she escapes, every Daesh [IS] control or checkpoint, or security force—they know that this girl ... has escaped from this owner". For over a year after the girls were first enslaved, Arab and Kurdish smugglers managed to free an average of 134 "slaves" a month. But by May 2016, an IS crackdown had reduced those numbers to just 39 in the previous six weeks, according the Kurdistan regional government. IS fighters targeted and killed "smugglers who rescue the captives". In 2016, funds provided by the Kurdistan Regional Government to buy the women out of slavery were cut off as a result of the collapse in the price of oil and disputes with Iraq's central government over revenues.

The freeing of Yezidi women continues, with one being found at the homes of an Islamic State commander in Ankara in July 2020. One seven-year old Yezidi girl was rescued from two IS commanders in Ankara by Turkish authorities in February 2021. In October 2024 Fawzia Amin Sido, a Yezidi woman who was kidnapped by IS and sold to a Palestinian IS supporter was rescued from the Gaza Strip by the Israeli Defense Forces. The woman was 11 when she was taken and was rescued after being held for 10 years.

=== Claimed Islamic justification for the enslavement of non-Muslim women ===
In its digital magazine Dabiq, IS explicitly claimed a religious justification for its enslavement of Yezidi women. IS's religious justifications were refuted by mainstream Islamic scholars.

According to The Wall Street Journal, IS appeals to apocalyptic beliefs and claims "justification by a Hadith that they interpret as portraying the revival of slavery as a precursor to the end of the world". In late 2014, IS released a pamphlet on the treatment of female slaves. The New York Times said in August 2015 that "[t]he systematic rape of women and girls from the Yazidi religious minority has become deeply enmeshed in the organization and the radical theology of the Islamic State in the year since the group announced it was reviving slavery as an institution."

== Yezidi refugees ==
=== Massacre of Yezidis in the Sinjar Mountains ===
The IS offensive in the Sinjar area of northern Iraq, 3–4 August, caused 30,000–50,000 Yezidis to flee into the Sinjar Mountains (Jabal Sinjar) fearing they would be killed by IS. They had been threatened with death if they refused conversion to Islam. A UN representative said that "a humanitarian tragedy is unfolding in Sinjar".

On 3 and 4 August 14 or later, Yezidi children and some elderly or disabled people died of hunger, dehydration, and heat on Mount Sinjar. By 6 August, according to reports from survivors, 200 Yezidi children while fleeing to Mount Sinjar had died from thirst, starvation, heat and dehydration.

==== Kurdish military intervention ====
Fifty thousand Yezidis, besieged by IS on Mount Sinjar, were able to escape after Kurdish People's Protection Units and PKK broke IS siege on the mountains. The majority of them were rescued by Kurdish PKK and YPG fighters. Multinational rescue operation involved dropping of supplies on the mountains and evacuation of some refugees by helicopters. During the rescue operation, on 12 August, an overloaded Iraqi Air Force helicopter crashed on Mount Sinjar, killing Iraqi Air Force Major General Majid Ahmed Saadi (the pilot) and injuring 20 people.

On 8 August, PKK provided humanitarian aid and camps to more than 3,000 Yezidi refugees.

By 20 October, 2,000 Yezidis, mainly volunteer fighters, who had remained behind to protect the villages, but also civilians (700 families who had not yet escaped), were reported as still in the Sinjar area, and were forced by IS to abandon the last villages in their control, Dhoula and Bork, and retreat to the Sinjar Mountains.

=== Forced conversions to Islam ===
In an article which was published in The Washington Post, it was stated that an estimated 7,000 Yezidis had been forced to convert to "the Islamic State group's harsh interpretation of Islam". Yezidi boys were taken to Raqqa, Syria, where they were trained to fight for IS, and some of them were forced to fight as U.S.-led forces closed in on the group.

=== Return of displaced Yezidis ===
The Yezidi residents of Sinun in northern Iraq who returned home faced many challenges.

Following IS's retreat from Iraqi and Kurdish forces in the region during late 2017 campaigns, both governments laid claim to the area. The Yezidi population, with only about 15% returning to Sinjar during the period, was caught in the political crossfire. Yezidis returned to an abandoned town of crumbling buildings, leftover IEDs and the remains of those killed during the massacre.

In November 2017, a mass grave of about 70 people was uncovered and a month later in December, another mass grave was discovered holding about 90 victims.

Thousands are still missing. To aid in the search, local business owners use their network of contacts to locate people. Former captives use their contacts to buy back Yezidi women sold into sex slavery and return them to their family. This additionally prevents their organs from being sold on the black market, each of which, according to an Islamic State informant, can be sold for $60,000–70,000.

==== Fate of Yezidi captives of the Islamic State ====
In January 2015, about 200 Yezidis were released by IS. Kurdish military officials believed they were released because they were a burden. On 8 April 2015, 216 Yezidis, with the majority being children and elderly, were released by IS after being held captive for about eight months. Their release occurred following an offensive by U.S.-led air assaults and pressure from Iraqi ground forces who were pushing northward and in the process of retaking Tikrit. According to General Hiwa Abdullah, a peshmerga commander in Kirkuk, those released were in poor health with signs of abuse and neglect visible.

In March 2016, Iraqi security forces managed to free a group of Yezidi women held hostage by IS in a special operation behind IS's lines in Mosul.

In March 2016, the militant group Kurdistan Workers' Party managed to free 51 Yezidis held hostages by IS in an operation called 'Operation Vengeance for Martyrs of Shilo'. Three Kurdistan Workers' Party guerrillas died during the operation.

In April 2016, the Kurdistan Workers' Party with the Sinjar Resistance Units managed to free another 53 Yezidis held hostages by IS.

== Classification as a genocide ==
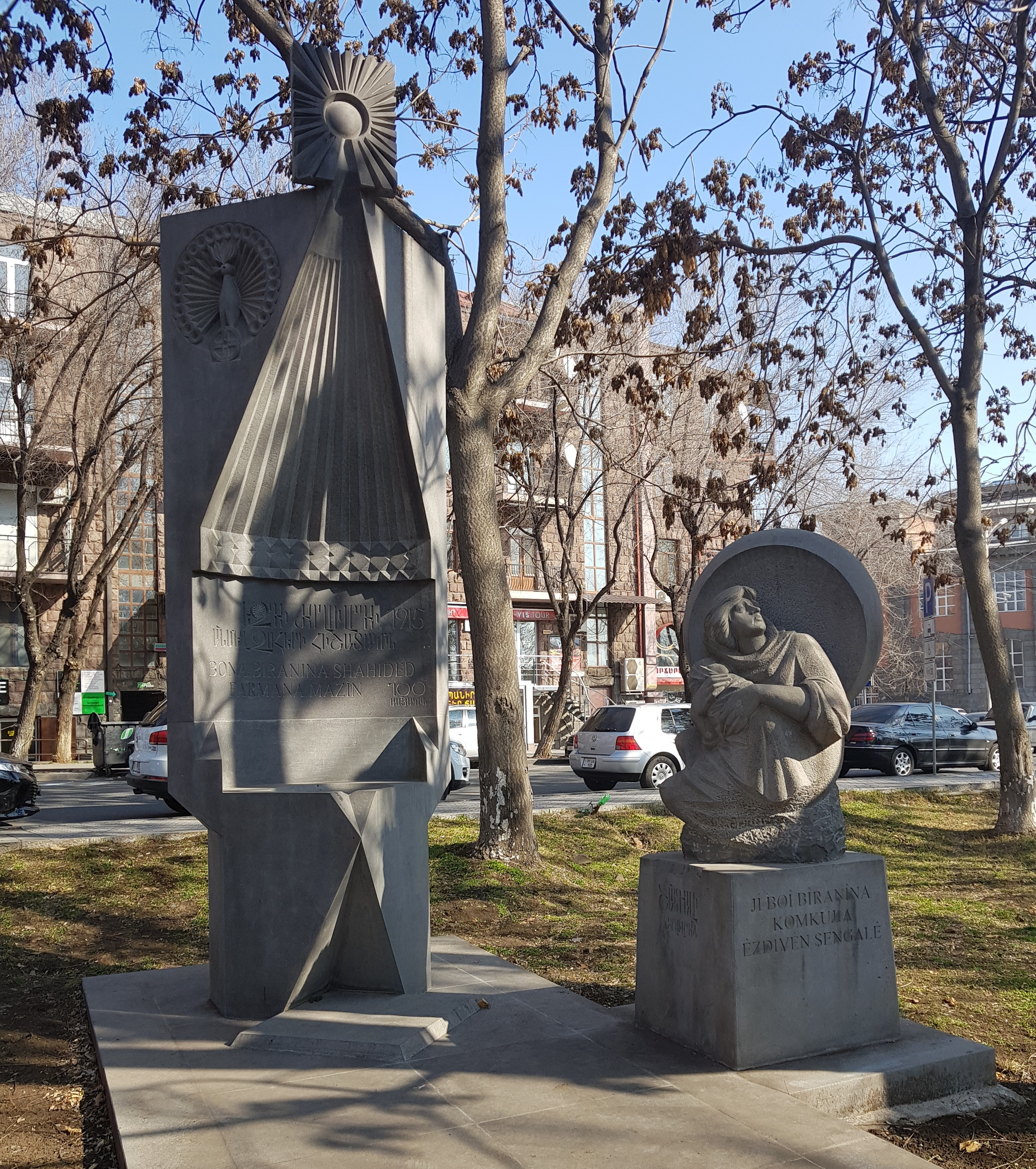
Yezidi Genocide Monument in Yerevan, Armenia

Many international organisations, governments and parliaments, as well as groups, have classified IS's treatment of the Yezidis as a genocide, and they have also condemned it as such. Additionally, the Genocide of Yezidis has officially been recognized as a genocide by several bodies of the United Nations and the European Parliament. Some states have recognized it as well, including the National Assembly of Armenia, the Australian parliament, the British Parliament, the Canadian parliament, and the United States House of Representatives. Multiple individual human rights activists such as Nazand Begikhani and Dr. Widad Akrawi have also advocated this view.

In 2017, CNN journalists Jomana Karadsheh and Chris Jackson interviewed former Yezidi captives and exclusively filmed the Daesh Criminal Investigations Unit (DCIU), a team of Iraqi Kurdish and western investigators who have been operating secretly in Northern Iraq, for more than two years, collecting evidence of IS' war crimes.

- United Nations:
  - In a March 2015 report, the persecution of the Yezidi people was qualified as a genocide by the Office of the United Nations High Commissioner for Human Rights (UNHCR). The organization cited the numerous atrocities such as forced religious conversion and sexual slavery as being parts of an overall malicious campaign.
  - In August 2017, the Independent International Commission of Inquiry on the Syrian Arab Republic of the United Nations Human Rights Council (UNHRC) stated that "IS committed the crime of genocide by seeking to destroy the Yazidis through killings, sexual slavery, enslavement, torture, forcible displacement, the transfer of children and measures intended to prohibit the birth of Yazidi children." It added that the genocide was ongoing, and stating that the international community still must recognize the detrimental effects of the genocide. The Commission wrote that, while some countries may choose to overlook the idea of the genocide, the atrocities need to be understood and the international community needs to bring the killings to an end.
  - In 2018, the Security Council team enforced the idea of a new accountability team that would collect evidence of the international crimes committed by the Islamic State. However, the international community has not been in full support of this idea, because it can sometimes oversee the crimes that other armed groups are involved in.
  - On 10 May 2021, the United Nations Investigative Team to Promote Accountability for Crimes Committed by Da'esh/IS (UNITAD) determined that IS's actions in Iraq constituted genocide.
- Council of Europe: On 27 January 2016, the Parliamentary Assembly of the Council of Europe adopted a resolution stating: "individuals who act in the name of the terrorist entity which calls itself 'Islamic State' (Daesh) ... have perpetrated acts of genocide and other serious crimes punishable under international law. States should act on the presumption that Daesh commits genocide and should be aware that this entails action under the 1948 United Nations Convention on the Prevention and Punishment of the Crime of Genocide." However, it did not identify victims.
- European Union: On 4 February 2016, the European Parliament unanimously passed a resolution to recognise 'that the so-called 'ISIS/Daesh' is committing genocide against Christians and Yezidis, and other religious and ethnic minorities, who do not agree with the so-called 'ISIS/Daesh' interpretation of Islam, and that this therefore entails action under the 1948 United Nations Convention on the Prevention and Punishment of the Crime of Genocide.' Additionally, it called for those who intentionally committed atrocities for ethnic or religious reasons to be brought to justice for violating international law, and committing crimes against humanity, and genocide.
- United States: The United States Department of State has formally recognised the Yezidi genocide in areas under the control of IS in 2016 and 2017. On 14 March 2016, the United States House of Representatives voted unanimously 393-0 that violent actions performed against Yezidis, Christians, Shia and other groups by IS were acts of genocide. Days later on 17 March 2016, United States Secretary of State John Kerry declared that the violence initiated by IS against the Yezidis and others amounted to genocide.
- United Kingdom: On 20 April 2016, the House of Commons of the United Kingdom unanimously supported a motion to declare that the treatment of Yezidis and Christians by the Islamic State amounted to genocide, to condemn it as such, and to refer the issue to the UN Security Council. In doing so, Conservative MPs defied their own party's government, who had tried to dissuade them from making such a statement, because of the Foreign Office legal department's long-standing policy (dating back to the 1948 passing of the Genocide Convention) of refusing to give a legal description to potential war crimes. Foreign Office secretary Tobias Ellwood – who was jeered at and interrupted by MPs during his speech in the debate – stated that he personally believed genocide had taken place, but that it was not up to politicians to make that determination, but to the courts. Furthermore, on 23 March 2017, the regional devolved Scottish Parliament adopted a motion stating: '[The Scottish Parliament] recognises and condemns the genocide perpetrated against the Yezidi people by Daesh [IS]; acknowledges the great human suffering and loss that have been inflicted by bigotry, brutality and religious intolerance, [and] further acknowledges and condemns the crimes perpetrated by Daesh against Muslims, Christians, Arabs, Kurds and all of the religious and ethnic communities of Iraq and Syria; welcomes the actions of the US Congress, the European Parliament, the French Senate, the UN and others in formally recognising the genocide'.
- Canada: On 25 October 2016, the House of Commons of Canada unanimously supported a motion tabled by MP Michelle Rempel Garner (CPC) to recognise that IS was committing genocide against the Yezidi people, to acknowledge that IS still kept many Yezidi women and girls captive as sex slaves, to support and take action on a recent UN commission report, and provide asylum to Yezidi women and girls within 120 days.
- France: On 6 December 2016, the French Senate unanimously approved a resolution stating that acts committed by the Islamic State against "the Christian and Yazidi populations, other minorities and civilians" were "war crimes", "crimes against humanity", and constituted a "genocide". It also invited the government to "use all legal channels" to have these crimes recognised, and the perpetrators tried. The National Assembly adopted a similar resolution two days later (originally tabled on 25 May 2016 by Yves Fromion of The Republicans), with the Socialist, Ecologist and Republican group abstaining and the other groups approving.
- Armenia: In January 2018, the Armenian parliament recognised and condemned the 2014 genocide of Yezidis by the Islamic State, and called on the international community to conduct an international investigation into the events.
- Israel: On 21 November 2018, a bill tabled by opposition MP Ksenia Svetlova (ZU) to recognise the Islamic State's killing of Yazidis as a genocide was defeated in a 58 to 38 vote in the Knesset. The coalition parties motivated their rejection of the bill by saying that the United Nations had not yet recognised it as a genocide.
- Iraq: On 1 March 2021, the Iraq parliament passed the Yezidi [Female] Survivors Bill which provides assistance to survivors and "determines the atrocities perpetrated by Daesh against the Yazidis, Turkmen, Christians and Shabaks to be genocide and crimes against humanity." The law provides compensation, measures for rehabilitation and reintegration, pensions, provision of land, housing, and education, and a quota in public sector employment. On 10 May 2021, the United Nations Investigative Team to Promote Accountability for Crimes Committed by Da'esh/IS (UNITAD) determined that ISIL's actions in Iraq constituted genocide.
- Belgium: On 30 June 2021, the Foreign Relations Commission of the Belgian Chamber of Representatives unanimously approved a resolution by opposition representatives Georges Dallemagne (cdH) and Koen Metsu (N-VA) to recognise IS's August 2014 massacre of thousands of Yezidi men and enslavement of thousands of Yezidi women and children as genocide. The resolution, which would likely also pass with overwhelming approval in the Chamber itself, called on the Belgian government to increase its efforts to support victims, and prosecute perpetrators (either at the International Criminal Court, or at a new ad hoc tribunal). On 17 July 2021, the Belgian parliament unanimously voted to recognize the suffering of the Yazidis at the hands of the Islamic State (IS) in 2014 as a genocide.
- Netherlands: On 6 July 2021, the Dutch House of Representatives unanimously passed a motion tabled by MP Anne Kuik (CDA) which recognised the crimes of Islamic State against the Yezidi population as a genocide and crimes against humanity.
- Germany: On 19 January 2023, the German Bundestag unanimously recognized the crimes against Yezidis as genocide. The resolution, which was jointly tabled by the government and the opposition, also calls for prosecution of the perpetrators and aid for rebuilding Yezidi villages.
- Switzerland: On 17 December 2024, the Swiss Parliament officially recognized the crimes by ISIS against Yazidis as genocide.

== Timeline ==
Timeline	Genocidal and related events
2013	Threatening of Yezidi students in Mosul University by Islamists
10 June 2014	Iraq's second largest city, Mosul falls under ISIS control
16 June 2014	ISIS seizes Tel Afar
3 August 2014	ISIS attacks Sinjar after withdrawal of Kurdish forces. Thousands of Yezidis flee to Sinjar mountain but are trapped with no access to food and water. Many die.
4 August 2014	At least 60 Yezidi men are killed by ISIS in Hardan village while women and children are forcefully taken as captives to Tel Afar.
7 August 2014	Air strike by the United States to "end siege" on Mount Sinjar. Several thousands of Yezidis have already been killed or taken captive by ISIS
9–11 August 2014	Syrian Kurdish forces create an escape corridor from Mount Sinjar. At least 100,000 IDPs arrive in the Kurdistan Region of Iraq
14 August 2014	United States ends humanitarian air drops on Mount Sinjar
15 August 2014	ISIS carries out the Kocho massacre after two weeks of siege. The majority of village men are killed and boys are forced to become child soldiers; the women and girls are sold into sexual slavery
October 2014	ISIS continues its propaganda on its Dabiq to enslave Yezidis
13 November 2015	Kurdish forces and Yezidi armed groups liberate Shingal from ISIS
22 March 2019	Baghouz of eastern Syria is liberated. Yezidi captives are reportedly beheaded by ISIS. Enslaved Yezidi child soldiers are released
27 October 2019	ISIS emir Abu Bakr al-Baghdadi is killed by the United States in Syria
1 March 2021	Yezidi survivors legislation is ratified by the Iraq parliament to offer compensation, land, and jobs
6 February 2021	A funeral is held for the 104 Yezidis from the Kocho massacre. Hundreds of bodies are exhumed from about 80 mass graves located around Sinjar, some of which could not be identified.

== International reactions ==
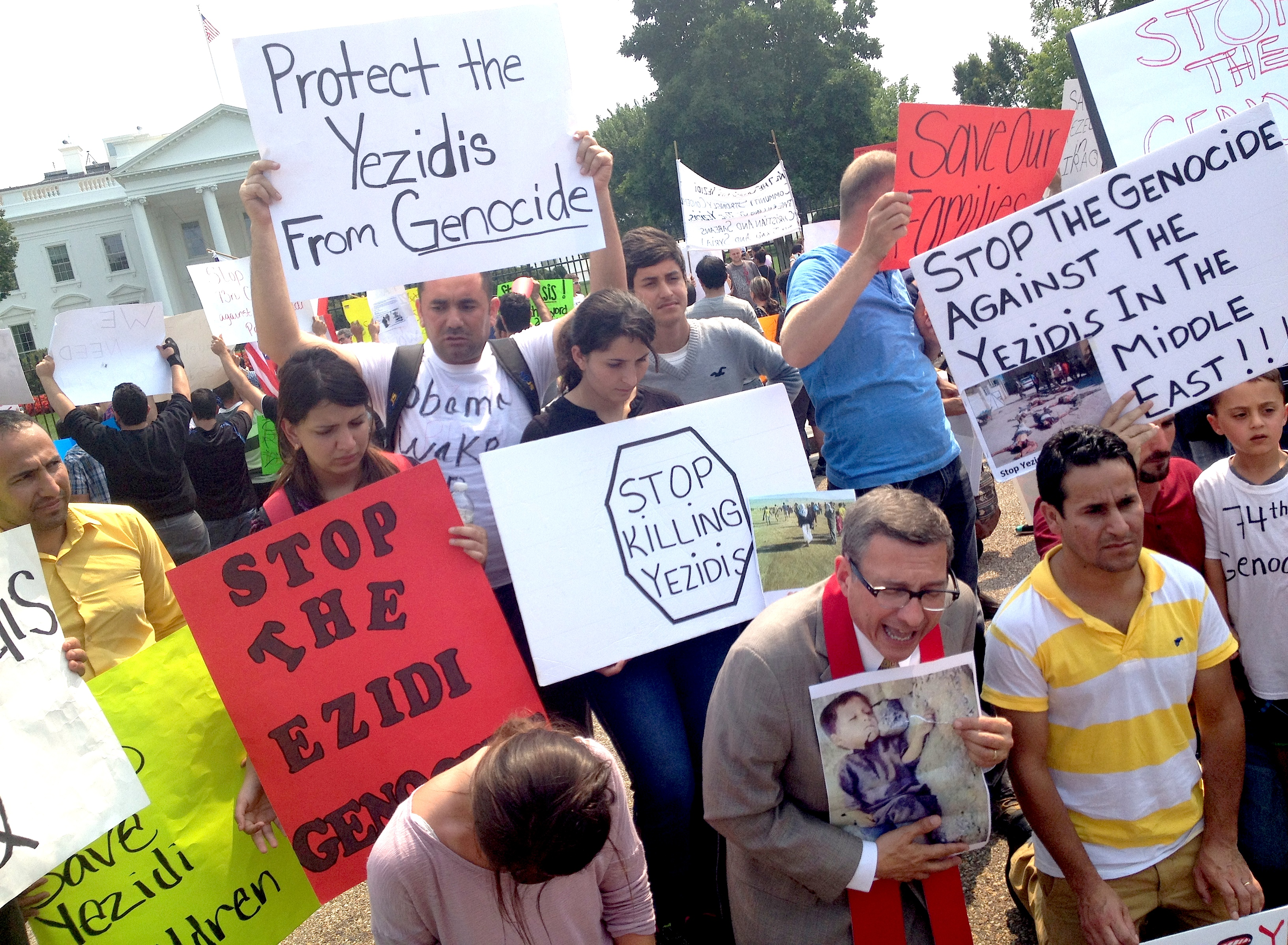
Yezidi demonstration in front of the White House in Washington, D.C. (August 2014)

IS's atrocities against Yezidis were strongly condemned by prominent Islamic scholars and Muslim organizations.

=== Western-led military intervention ===
On 7 August 2014, U.S. President Barack Obama ordered targeted airstrikes on IS militants and emergency air relief for the Yezidis. Airstrikes began on 8 August. (See US-led intervention in Iraq (2014–2021)#Obama's decision for airstrikes.)

On 8 August 2014, the US asserted that the systematic destruction of the Yezidi people by the Islamic State was genocide.

President Barack Obama had authorized the attacks to protect Yezidis but also Americans and Iraqi minorities. President Obama gave an assurance that no troops would be deployed for combat. Along with the airstrikes of 9 August, the US airdropped 3,800 gallons of water and 16,128 MREs. Following these actions, the United Kingdom and France stated that they also would begin airdrops.

On 10 August 2014, at approximately 2:15 a.m. ET, the US carried out five additional airstrikes on armed vehicles and a mortar position, enabling 20,000–30,000 Yezidi Iraqis to flee into Syria and later be rescued by Kurdish forces. The Kurdish forces then provided shelter for the Yezidis in Dohuk.

On 13 August 2014, fewer than 20 United States Special Forces troops stationed in Irbil along with British Special Air Service troops visited the area near Mount Sinjar to gather intelligence and plan the evacuation of approximately 30,000 Yezidis still trapped on Mount Sinjar. One hundred and twenty-nine additional US military personnel were deployed to Irbil to assess and provide a report to President Obama. The United States Central Command also reported that a seventh airdrop was conducted and that to date, 114,000 meals and more than 35,000 gallons of water had been airdropped to the displaced Yezidis in the area.

In a statement on 14 August 2014, The Pentagon said that the 20 US personnel who had visited the previous day had concluded that a rescue operation was probably unnecessary since there was less danger from exposure or dehydration and the Yezidis were no longer believed to be at risk of attack from IS. Estimates also stated that 4,000 to 5,000 people remained on the mountain, with nearly half of which being Yezidi herders who lived there before the siege.

Kurdish officials and Yezidi refugees stated that thousands of young, elderly, and disabled individuals on the mountain were still vulnerable, with the governor of Kurdistan's Dahuk province, Farhad Atruchi, saying that the assessment was "not correct" and that although people were suffering, "the international community is not moving".

==== Humanitarian aid ====
IDP camps are built to be temporary solutions, but they trap you in a cycle of day-to-day survival, rather than allowing you to progress toward recovery.

— Nadia Murad, August 2022

30,000–40,000 Yezidis fled to Syria, 100,000 Yezidis took refuge in Kurdish controlled Zakho, Iraq. In Syria, the UNHCR provided material and transportation to Yezidi refugees and local Syrian communities cooked them meals. Turkey initially took in 2,000 Yezidis refugees in Silopi, where they were provided food and medical care, but some refugees were turned back. The Turkish Disaster Relief Agency (AFAD) also set up refugee camps in Zakho, Iraq. By 31 August, Turkey reportedly hosted 16,000 Yezidi refugees.

The US military air dropped food and water to Yezidis trapped on Mount Sinjar. Today's Zaman reported that Turkey also airdropped humanitarian aid to Yezidi refugees within Iraq.

=== United Nations, Arab League, and NGOs ===
- United Nations – On 13 August 2014, the United Nations declared the Yezidi crisis a highest-level "Level 3 Emergency", saying that the declaration "will facilitate mobilization of additional resources in goods, funds and assets to ensure a more effective response to the humanitarian needs of populations affected by forced displacements". On 19 March 2015, a United Nations panel concluded that IS "may have committed" genocide against the Yazidis with an investigation head, Suki Nagra, stating that the attacks on the Yezidis "were not just spontaneous or happened out of the blue, they were clearly orchestrated".
- Arab League – On 11 August 2014, the Arab League accused IS of committing crimes against humanity by persecuting the Yezidis.
- Defend International – On 6 September 2014, Defend International launched a worldwide campaign entitled "Save The Yazidis: The World Has To Act Now" to raise awareness about the tragedy of the Yezidis in Sinjar; coordinate activities related to intensifying efforts aimed at rescuing Yezidi and Christian women and girls captured by IS; provide a platform for discussion and the exchange of information on matters and activities relevant to securing the fundamental rights of the Yezidis, no matter where they reside; and building a bridge between potential partners and communities whose work is relevant to the campaign, including individuals, groups, communities, and organizations active in the areas of women's and girls' rights, inter alia, as well as actors involved in ending modern-day slavery and violence against women and girls. The U.S. Commission on International Religious Freedom (USCIRF) emphasized the continued threats against Yazidis and made calls for U.S. government action to support the human rights and religious freedom of the group in Iraq.

=== Prosecutions of Islamic State personnel ===
Amal Clooney of the Center for Justice & Accountability (CJA), represented five Yezidi women before the United States District Court for the Eastern District of Virginia against Umm Sayyaf seeking prosecution of Sayyaf for her role in their enslavement. In 2021, German courts convicted IS women for their involvement in the enslavement of Yazidi women. German courts also prosecuted Taha al-Jumailly, an Iraqi member of the Islamic State, for his involvement in the Yezidi genocide, to include the murder of a five-year-old girl. A report by the Yazidi Justice Committee accused, Turkey, Syria, and Iraq, of failing to prevent and punish the genocide.

In November 2019, Turkish President Recep Tayyip Erdoğan announced that Turkish authorities had captured Asma Fawzi Mohammed al-Dulaimi, Abu Bakr al-Baghdadi's first wife. A Turkish official stated that she had in fact been captured on 2 June 2018 in the province of Hatay, along with 10 others. She was sentenced to death in Iraq on 10 July 2024, as punishment for the crime of working with IS and for detaining Yezidi women in her house.

In March 2026, French authorities held a four-day trial in absentia of IS official Sabri Essid, who is believed to have died in Syria in 2018. Due to a lack of official confirmation of his death, prosecutors decided to try him so that he could be arrested should he resurface. On 20 March Essid was pronounced guilty of genocide and crimes against humanity for having enslaved, tortured and inflicted "serious bodily or mental harm constituting genocide" against Yezidi women and children between 2014 and 2016.

In July 2026, the Higher Regional Court of Munich convicted an Iraqi Kurdish couple, identified as Twana H.S. and Asia R.A., of genocide, crimes against humanity, and war crimes over the enslavement, torture, and sexual abuse of two Yezidi girls between 2015 and 2017. Twana H.S. was sentenced to life imprisonment, and Asia R.A. was given a juvenile sentence of nine years and six months.

=== Resettlement of Yezidi refugees ===
United States Senators Amy Klobuchar and Lindsey Graham called on then United States President Joe Biden to help resettle Yezidi survivors of the Islamic State campaign of 2014–2017.

== See also ==
- Index of articles related to the Yezidis
- Bibliography of genocide studies
- Yazidi genocide by the Soran Emirate (1832-1834)
- Genocide of Christians by the Islamic State
- Mass executions in Islamic State-occupied Mosul
- Yezidism in Iraq
- Xenophobia and racism in the Middle East
- Genocides in history
- Genocide studies
