= Borek, Iraq =

Borek بورك
- Village
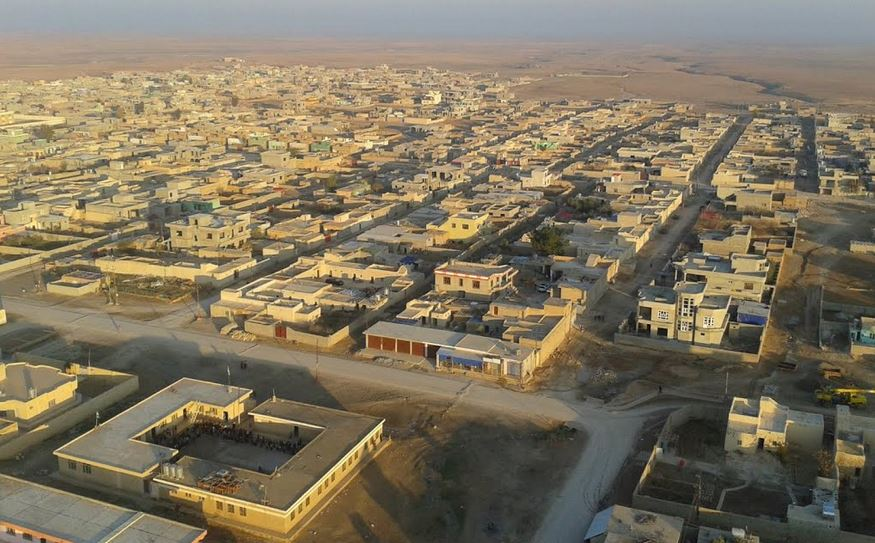

- Location in Iraq
- Coordinates: 36°29′32″N 41°51′54″E
- Country: Iraq
- Governorate: Ninawa
- District: Sinjar District

Population (July 2014)
  - Total: 18,259

Borek (also written Burke, Arabic: بورك; Kurdish: بۆرک, romanized: Borik, also known in Arabic as al-Yarmouk) is a village located in the Sinjar District of the Ninawa Governorate in northern Iraq. The village is located north of the Sinjar Mount. It belongs to the disputed territories of Northern Iraq. Borek has exclusively Yazidi population.
