= Dohula =

Dohula دهولا
- Village
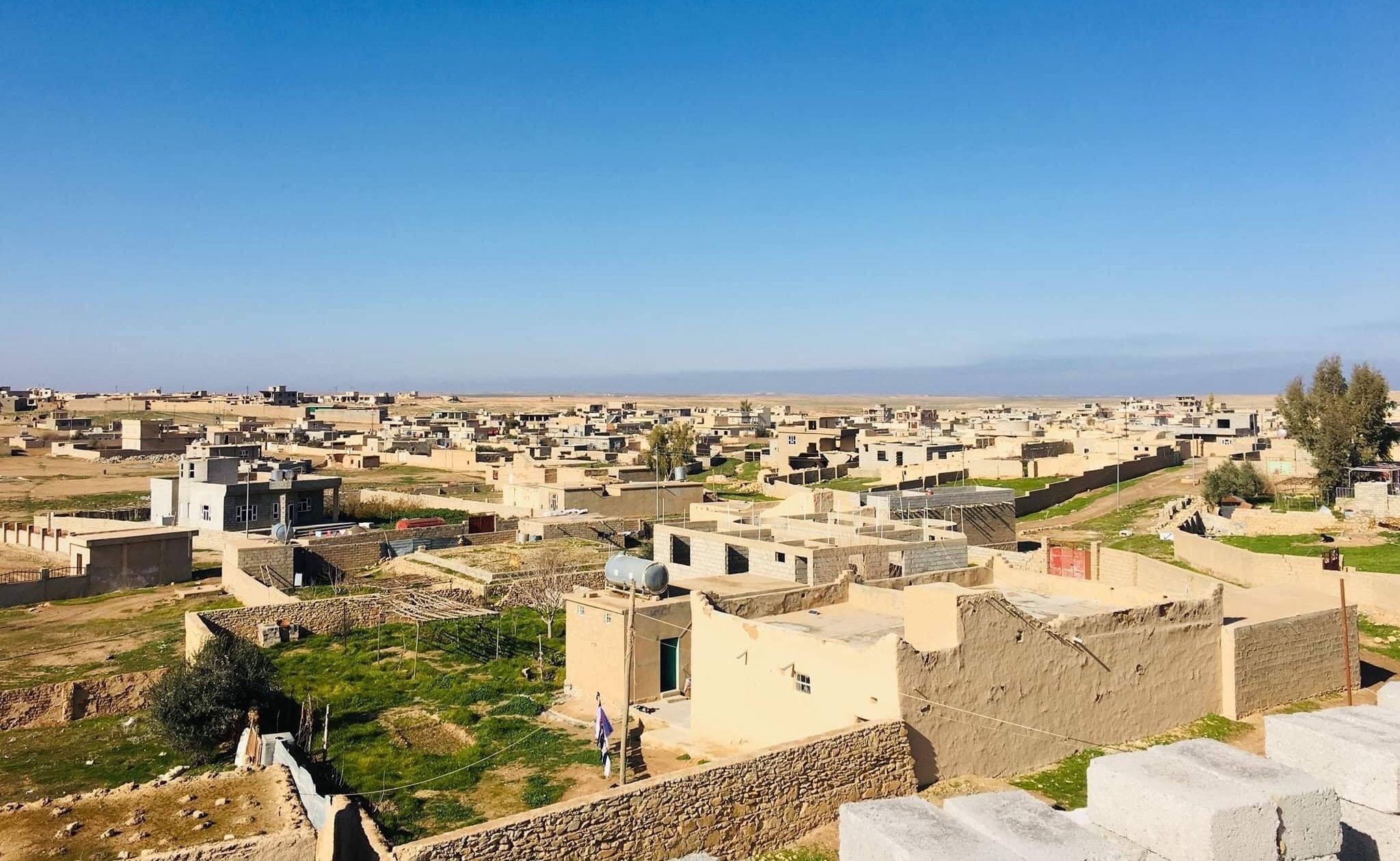

- Location in Iraq
- Coordinates: 36°29′24″N 41°48′46″E
- Country: Iraq
- Governorate: Ninawa
- District: Sinjar District

Population (July 2014)
  - Total: 13,516

Dohula (also written Duhola or Dohla, Arabic: دهولا; Kurdish: دوهۆلا, romanized: Dohula, also known in Arabic as Qadisiyah) is a village located in the Sinjar District of the Ninawa Governorate in northern Iraq. The village is located north of the Sinjar Mount. It belongs to the disputed territories of Northern Iraq. It is populated by Yazidis.
