= Dugure =

Dugure Dugurê دوكوري
- Village
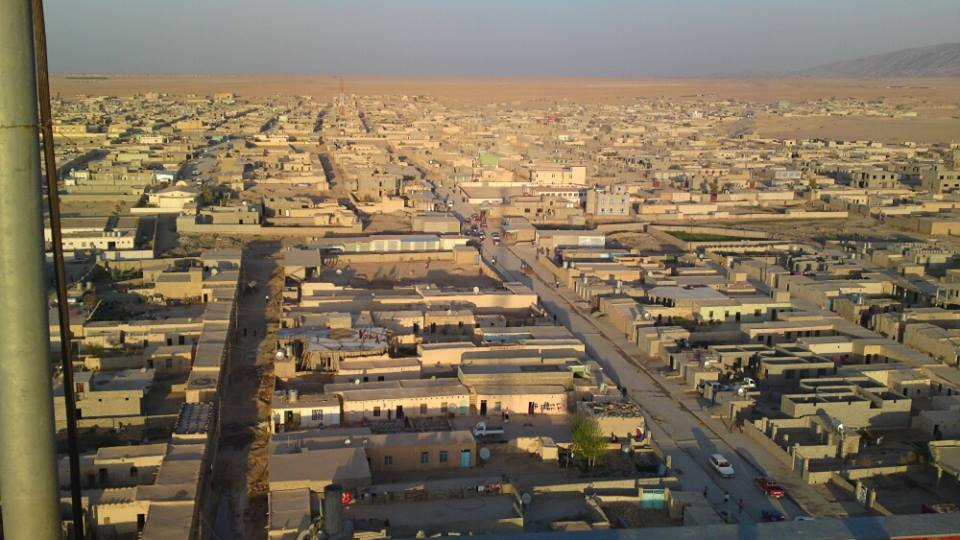

- Location in Iraq
- Coordinates: 36°28′32″N 41°44′59″E
- Country: Iraq
- Governorate: Ninawa
- District: Sinjar District

Population (July 2014)
  - Total: 23,439

Dugure (also written Duguri, Dkory or Dkora Arabic: دوكوري, Kurdish: Dugurê ,دوگورێ also known in Arabic as Hiteen) is a village located in the Sinjar District of the Ninawa Governorate in northern Iraq. The village is located north of the Sinjar Mount. It belongs to the disputed territories of Northern Iraq.

Dugure has exclusively Yazidi population.
