= Khana Sor =

- Town
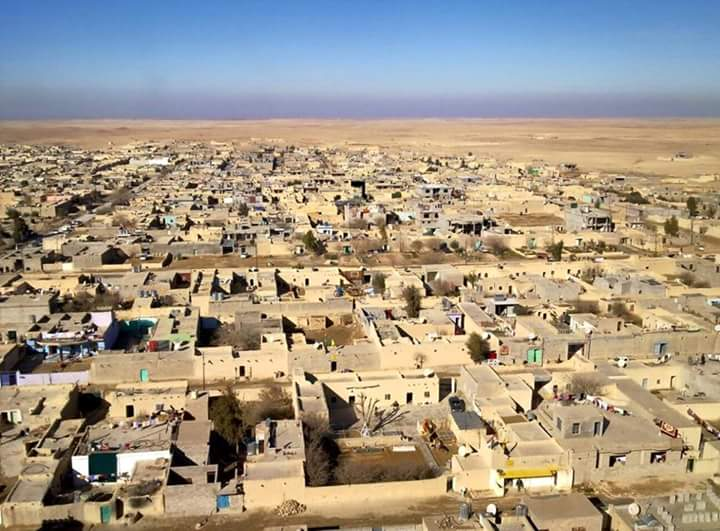

- Location in Iraq
- Coordinates: 36°28′23″N 41°36′58″E
- Country: Iraq
- Governorate: Ninawa
- District: Sinjar District

Population (July 2014)
  - Total: 31,161

Khana Sor (also written Khanasor, Kurdish: خاناسۆر, romanized: Xanasor, Arabic: خانصور, meaning: red house) is a town located in the Sinjar District of the Ninawa Governorate in Iraq. The town is located north of the Sinjar Mount. It belongs to the disputed territories of Northern Iraq.

Khana Sor is populated by Yazidis. During the Sinjar massacre, 100 Yazidis were massacred in the village by the ISIL.
