= Kurdish Women's Rights Watch =

Human rights organization

Kurdish Women's Rights Watch (KWRW) was set up in June 2004 as a non-profit-making, non-political network of activists, academics, lawyers and journalists. Based in the United Kingdom, KWRW grew out of Kurdish Women's Action Against Honour Killings (KWAHK), an association that was set up in 2000. The current president is Nazand Begikhani.

It campaigns to promote awareness of the condition of Kurdish women, with particular attention to domestic violence and honour killings. It also works to improve the health and education of Kurdish women, in cooperation with women's groups and human rights organisations in Kurdistan and the Kurdish diaspora. It is currently working with Bristol University on a study of honour-based violence in Iraqi Kurdistan and the United Kingdom.

Their site is hacked.
