= Sinun =

- Town
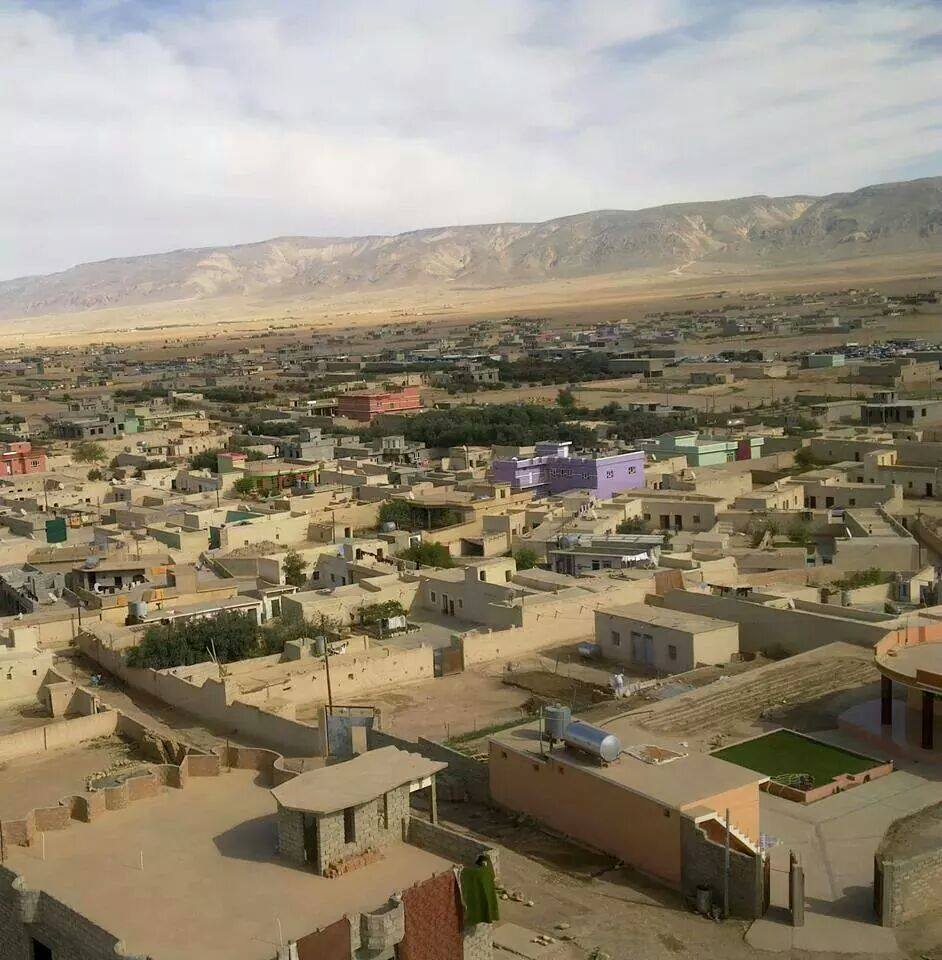

- Location in Iraq
- Coordinates: 36°27′27″N 41°42′22″E
- Country: Iraq
- Governorate: Ninawa
- District: Sinjar District

Population (July 2014)
  - Total: 16,798

Sinun (also written Sinuni, Sinooni or Snuny, Arabic: سنوني; Kurdish: سنونێ, romanized: Sinunê) is a town located in the Sinjar District of the Ninawa Governorate in Iraq. The town is located north of the Sinjar Mount. It belongs to the disputed territories of Northern Iraq.

Sinun is populated by Yazidis.
