= Til Ezer =

- Village
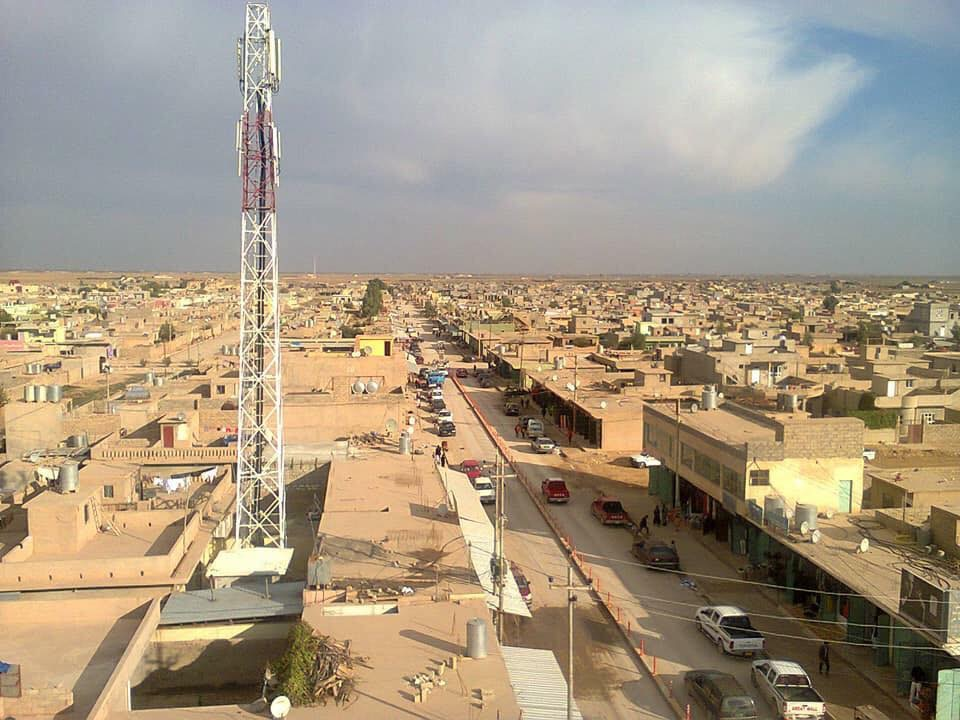

- Location in Iraq
- Coordinates: 36°12′6″N 41°41′18″E
- Country: Iraq
- Governorate: Ninawa
- District: Sinjar District

Population (July 2014)
  - Total: 28,000

Til Ezer (Kurdish: تل ئه‌زه‌ر, romanized: Tel Ezêr, Arabic: القحطانية, also known in Arabic as al-Qaḥṭānīya or Qahtaniyah, also spelled Giruzer, Kar Izir, Kahtaniya) is a village located in the Sinjar District of the Ninawa Governorate in Iraq. The village is located south of the Sinjar Mount, in the disputed territories of Northern Iraq.

Til Ezer is populated by Yazidis. It was one of two villages targeted in the 2007 Yazidi communities bombings against the local Yazidi community.

== See also ==
- Siba Sheikh Khidir
- Genocide of Yazidis by ISIL
- Sinjar massacre
