= Sinjar District =

Sinjar District قەزای شنگال قضاء سنجار
- District
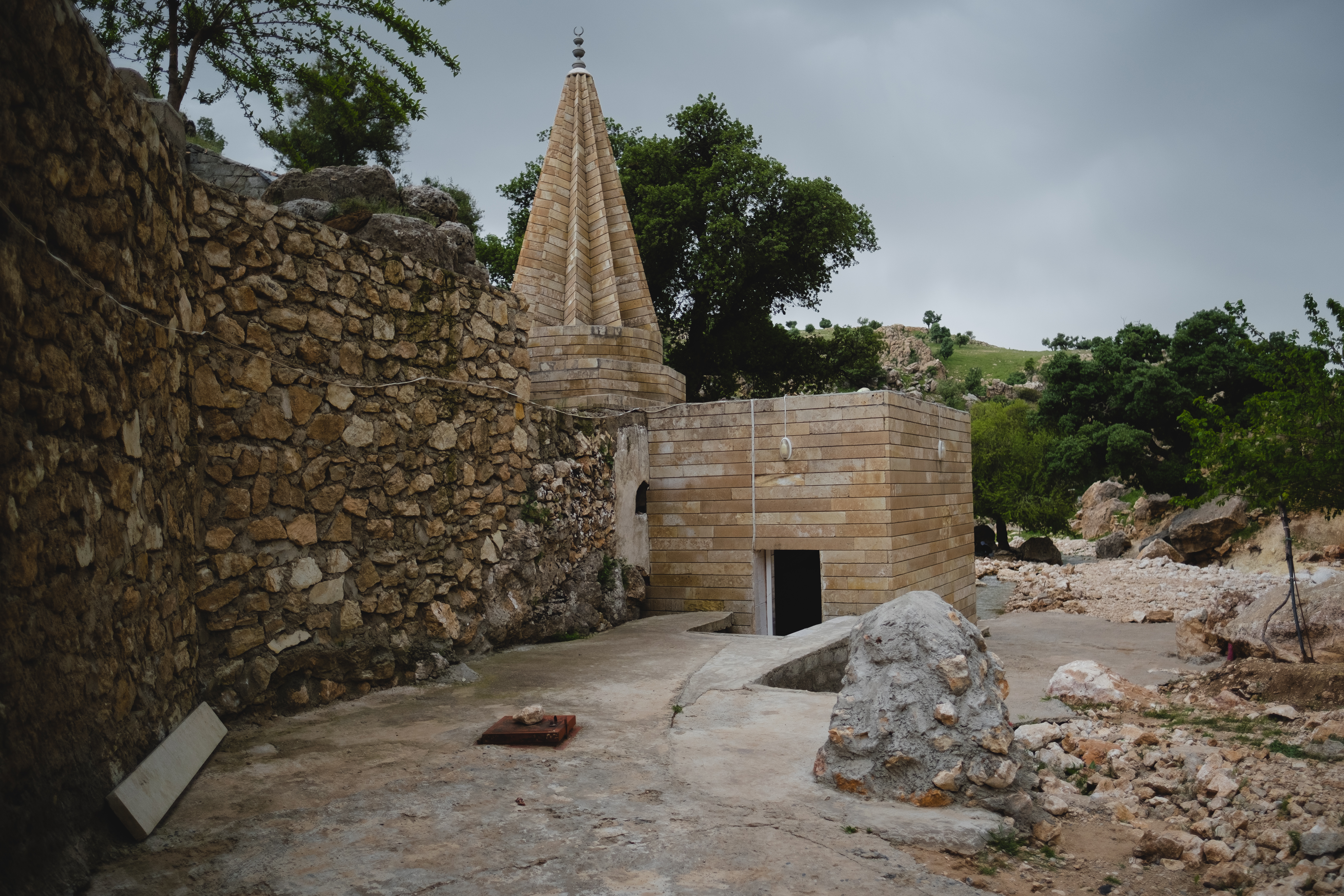
- Yezidi shrine atop Sinjar Mountain, 2019.

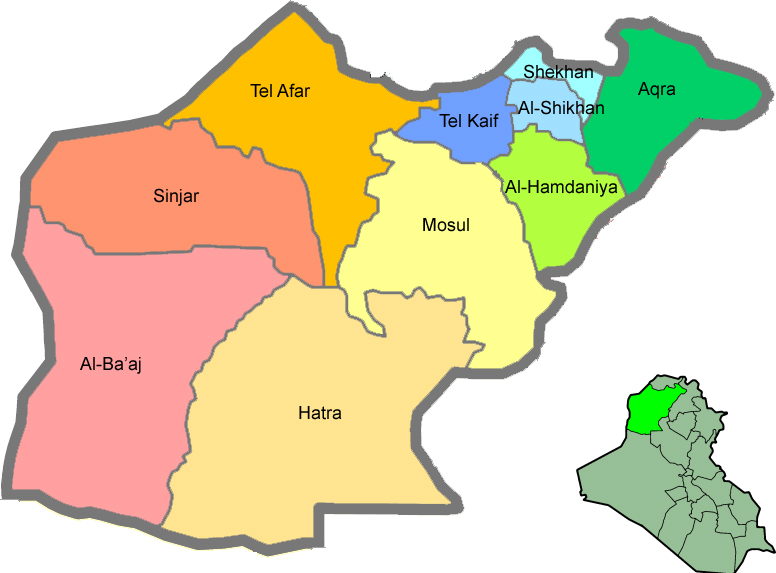
- Sinjar district (orange) in Ninawa

- Location within Iraq
- Coordinates: 36°19′21″N 41°51′51″E
- Country: Iraq
- Governorate: Nineveh
- Royal Decree 4: 1934
- Seat: Sinjar

Area
  - Total: 2,928 km^{2} (1,131 sq mi)

Population (2024)
  - Total: 201,002
- Time zone: UTC+3 (AST)

The Sinjar District or the Shingal District (Kurdish: قەزای شنگال, Qeza Şingal, Arabic: قضاء سنجار) is a district of the Nineveh Governorate. The district seat is the town of Sinjar. The district has two subdistricts, al-Shemal and al-Qayrawan. The district is one of two major population centers for Yazidis, the other being Shekhan District.

== History ==
Sinjar District was created in 1934 by Royal decree. After the 1935 Yazidi revolt, the district was placed under military control.

The al-Shamal district, originally formed in 1936, was abolished in 1987, and its area was added to Sinjar. Qayrawan was formed as a district in 1977, was also abolished in 1987, and was added to the district. In 1994, al-Shamal and Qayrawan were reformed as a sub-districts.

In 2007, several explosions set off by ISI killed hundreds of Yazidis in Shengal. In August 2014, the Siege of Mount Sinjar raged between Sunni militants of the Islamic State of Iraq and the Levant (ISIL) and the Kurdish Peshmerga, leading to a mass exodus of residents, especially from the Yazidi community, branded by the Islamic State as "devil worshippers", after the Peshmerga was defeated. The New York Times reported that ISIL killed dozens of Yazidi men and forced their women to marry jihadi fighters." According to Iraqi MP Vian Dakhil, an estimated 6,383 Yazidi women and children were taken as sex slaves by ISIS/ISIL.

According to Kurdish sources, nine Yazidi mass graves had been found by the end of the offensive. Eighteen Yazidi shrines have also been destroyed by ISIS militants since June 2014. As additional graves were found, masked Yazidis retaliated against assumed ISIL collaborators in four Muslim villages in late January 2015 with Sibaya and Chiri attacked on January 25 and Khazuga and Sayer on January 26. PKK, YPG and YPJ joint forces were able to stop additional attacks on two more villages after Peshmerga fled the area. It was announced on October 17, 2017, that the area had returned to Iraqi government control.

=== Declaration of autonomy ===
In August 2017, the Yazidis of Sinjar declared their government autonomous at a press conference. Peshmerga forces withdrew from Sinjar on 17 October 2017, allowing the Iraqi Army and the Popular Mobilisation Units (PMU) to enter the town. The control of the town was handed over to the PMU-backed Yazidi group called "Lalesh Brigades" after Peshmerga's withdrawal.

In June 2020, the United States Commission on International Religious Freedom accused Turkey that during the Operations Claw-Eagle and Claw-Tiger, Turkey threatened Yazidi families who attempted to return to their homes in the town. Turkey rejected the claims.

In 2021 the Iraqi government called for the local Yazidi protection forces (who had fought ISIS), in Sinjar to withdraw, which was rejected by the Yazidi administration. This has led to international calls for the Iraqi army to de-escalate and withdraw from the region.

== Geography ==
The Sinjar District borders and is a crossing point with Syria. The district is 136 km from Mosul city, the capital of the Nineveh Governorate. The Sinjar Mountains are located in the district.

== Economy ==
The district's economy is primarily based on agriculture with the main crops being barley, figs, wheat, and tobacco. In the villages of Ain al-Ghazal and Hayali exist oil fields, which were closed because of the Iraq war. Natural gas and heavy minerals exist in the Sinjar Mountains.

== Settlements ==
- Ain al-Ghazal, Sunni
- Bahrava, Yezidi
- Bare, Yezidi
- Borek, Yezidi
- Chiri Yezidi
- Dohula, Yezidi
- Duguri, Yezidi
- Gir Azêr (also Til Ezer), Yezidi
- Gohbal, Yezidi
- Hayali Yezidi
- Khana Sor, Yezidi
- Khazuga, Sunni
- Majnuniyê, Yezidi
- Qayrawan or Qairouan, also called Balij or Bulayj, Sunni
- Sayer, Sunni
- Sîba Şêx Xidir, Yezidi
- Shingal, Yezidi, seat of the district
- Sinone (also Sinuni), Yezidi, seat of Al-Shamal subdistrict
- Sibaya, Sunni
- Solagh, Yezidi
- Wardiyê/Zirafki, Yezidi
- Zorava, Yezidi
- Hardan, Yezidi

others:

- Adîke ئادیکە
- Dihil
- Kersê کەرسێ
- Koço
- Rifeyi
- Sinun
- Gura / Isdêra Şimalê
- Telezêr
- Tel Qeseb
- Tel Benat
- Qabusî
- Xalabazar

== See also ==
- Yazidi genocide
- Kurdification & Arabization
- List of Yazidi holy places
- List of Yazidi settlements
