= Siba Sheikh Khidir =

Siba Sheikh Khidir Sîba Şêx Xidir الجزيرة
- Village
- Location in Iraq
- Coordinates: 36°11′0″N 41°35′35″E
- Country: Iraq
- Governorate: Ninawa
- District: Sinjar District

Population (July 2014)
  - Total: 23,000

Siba Sheikh Khidir (Kurdish: سیبا شێخ خدر, romanized: Sîba Şêx Xidir, Arabic: الجزيرة, romanized: al-Jazirah, also Jazira or Jazeera) is a village located in the Sinjar District of the Ninawa Governorate in Iraq. The village is located south of the Sinjar Mount. It belongs to the disputed territories of Northern Iraq. Siba Sheikh Khidir is populated by Yazidis and was one of two villages targeted in the 2007 Yazidi communities bombings against the local Yazidi community.

== See also ==
- Til Ezer
- Yazidi Genocide
- Sinjar massacre
