= Nazand Begikhani =

Kurdish writer

- Citizenship: British/French
- Education: Sorbonne University
- Occupations: Poet, Academic researcher, Human rights advocate
- Writing career
- Language: Kurdish, English, French, Arabic and Persian
- Years active: 1995–present
- Period: 1990s–present
- Genres: Poetry, academic research, advocacy
- Subjects: Sexual and Gender-based violence, Literature, poetry
- Notable works: Bells of Speech, Colour of Sand, Yesterday of Tomorrow
- Notable awards: Emma Humphreys Memorial Prize, Simone Landrey's Feminine Poetry Prize, French Honorary Citizenship, Kurdistan Gender Equality Price, 2015
- Movements: Feminism, Human rights activism
- Website: nazand-begikhani.com

Nazand Begikhani is a contemporary Kurdish/British/French writer, poet and academic researcher into sexual and gender based violence (SGBV), and an active advocate of human rights. She is an honorary Senior Research Fellow at the University of Bristol, Centre for Gender and Violence Research and was awarded the Vincent Wright Chair 2019/2020 as visiting professor at Sciences Po School for International Affairs, Paris, where she teaches a semester on SGBV.

Begikhani received her M.A and Ph.D. in comparative literature from the Sorbonne in France, and published her first collection of poems in Paris, 1995. She has published ten poetry collections in mainly Kurdish but also in English and French. Bells of Speech was her first collection in English published by Ambit (London 2006). Two of her poetry collections have been translated into French, Couleur de Sable (2011) and Le Lendemain d'Hier (2013). She has also translated works of Baudelaire and T. S. Eliot into Kurdish. Her works in English and French have been published by the Poetry Magazine, Ambit magazine, Poetry Salzburg Review, Modern Poetry in Translation, Exiled Writers' Ink, Action Poétique, etc. Her poetry collections have been translated into many other languages, including Arabic, Persian, German, and Spanish.

Nazand Begikhani is also an active advocate of human rights and helped establish a number of activist-based networks, studies centers and feminist campaigns, including Kurdish Women Action against Honour Killing (KWAHK), later changed to Kurdish Women's Rights Watch (KWRW) and gender-related studies centers in Kurdistan. She has provided expert advice on honour-based violence (HBV) to a number of government bodies, including Sweden, UK and Kurdistan. Between 2007 and 2009, she sat on the board of the High Commission to Monitor Violence Against Women in Kurdistan Region and participated, as an expert witness and independent observer, in its seasonal meetings. In 2010, with colleagues from the University of Bristol, she established the pioneering Gender and Violence Studies Centre at the University of Sulaimaniya (now Gender Equality Center), a two-year project funded by the British Council. She currently advises the Kurdistan President on higher education and gender in the Kurdistan Region of Iraq (KRI). She has integrated the concept of gender into the KRI's curriculum with the aiming to develop feminist research and produce evidence-based knowledge on SGBV to inform policy and practice. Her work has had considerable influence on action and strategy to address HBV in Kurdistan. She publishes academic work and poetry in Kurdish, English and French.

Nazand Begikhani has worked with the Kurdish Institute of Paris, the Kurdish Cultural Centre in London, the BBC BBC Monitoring, the University of Bristol as senior research fellow and Le Monde Diplomatique as editor in chief of the Kurdish edition.

Nazand Begikhani has won several international prizes for her work and activities, including the UK Emma Humphreys Memorial Prize for her work combating honor crimes (2000) and the French Simone Landrey Feminine Poetry Prize (2012) for her poetry work, Kurdish Gender Equality Prize (2015). in 2017, she was awarded French Honorary Citizenship by the City of Chateaux-Renault.

== Poetry works ==
- Yesterday of Tomorrow, Collection of Poetry, Association of Kurdish Artists in France, Paris, 1995.
- Celebrations, Collection of Poetry, Aras, Iraqi Kurdistan, 2004.
- Colour of Sand, Collection of Poetry with Dilawar Qaradaghi, Aras, Iraqi Kurdistan, 2005.
- Bells of Speech, Ambit Books Publishers, London, 64 pp., 2006. (English) ISBN 0-900055-11-1
- Bells of Speech, Collected Poems, Ranj Publishers, Sulaimaniya, 2007.(Kurdish)
- Love: An inspired Absence, Poetry Collection, Ranj Publishesrs, Sulaimaniya, 2008
- Ranin Al-kalam, Translation of collected poems Bells of Speech into Arabic by Qays Qaradaghi and Muhammad Afif al-Hussaini, Dar Al-jamal, Lebanon, 2011
- Couleur de Sables, translation of Colour of Sand into French by Shakour Bayz and Bertrand Foly, L'Harmattan, Paris, 2011
- "Le Lendemain d'Hier". Translated by Nicole Barriere and Claude Ber with the cooperation the author, Les Amandiers, 2013.
- 'A Promenade with John Donne', Ghazalnus Publishers, Tehran, 2017.
- 'Oeuvres Completes of Nazand Begikhani's Poetry', Mang Publishers, Tehran, 2019.
- One Day You Will Become a Willow (Nusyar, Danemark, 2024).

=== Selected books and anthologies featuring Nazand Begikhani's work ===
- Hamelink Wendelmoet & Nerina Weiss, “Theorising Women and War in Kurdistan. A feminist and critical perspective”, Kurdish Studies Journal. Vol: 6, N0 1, 2018.
- With Gill, Aisha K.; Hague, Gill (December 2013). "'Honour'-based violence and Kurdish communities: Moving towards action and change in Iraqi Kurdistan and the UK". Journal of Gender Studies. 22 (4): 383–396. doi:10.1080/09589236.2012.708825. S2CID 143845062.
- With Gill, Aisha K.; Hague, Gill (March–April 2012). "'Honour'-based violence in Kurdish communities". Women's Studies International Forum. 35 (2): 75–85. doi:10.1016/j.wsif.2012.02.001.
- Circulation of Meaning: A selection of media internviews with Nazand Begikhani, Ranj Publishers, Sulaimaniya, 2008.
- "Honour-based violence among the Kurds: The case of Iraqi Kurdistan” Honour : Crimes, Paragigms and Violence against Women", edited by Dr Lynn Welshman and Sarah Hussain, Zed Books, September 2005.
- “Here Me There” in Crossing the border: voices of refugee and exiled women, edited by Jennifer Langer, Five Leaves publications, 2002.
- “Kurdish women: A space for the self”, in The Silver Throat of the Moon: Writing in Exile", edited by Jennifer Langer, Five Leaves, 2005.
- “Modern Kurdish Poetry“, an anthology of Kurdish poetry by Kamal Mirawdali and Stephen Watts, Upsala, 2006.
- “Voice“ in Inspired Verse by Wyndham Thomas (Corsham Print, Easter 2007).
- “The war was over”, in The Poetry of Recovery by Sante Lucia Books, USA, 2007.
- “At a happiness symposium in Wales” in Fragments from the Dark by Jeni Williams & Lateafa Guemar, Hafan Books, 2008.
- “An ordinary day” in The Forward Book of Poetry by Forward Ltd in association with Faber and Faber, 2007.
- “Anfal genocide: Collective Memory and Kurdish Political Will, in Silence and Mass Murder by Heme Kake Rash, Sardam Publishing House, April 2008.
- “After Shocks: The Poetry of Recovery for Life-Shattering Events”, by Tom Lombardo, Saint Lucia Books, Atlanta, Georgia, 2008.

== See also ==
- List of Kurdish scholars
