= Tal Banat =

- Village
- Location in Iraq
- Coordinates: 36°15′18″N 42°0′59″E
- Country: Iraq
- Governorate: Ninawa
- District: Sinjar District

Population (July 2014)
  - Total: 14,000

Tal Banat (also written Tel Benat, Arabic: تل بنات; Kurdish: ته‌ل به‌نات, romanized: Tel Benat, also known in Arabic as al-Waleed) is a village located in the Sinjar District of the Ninawa Governorate in Iraq. The village is located south of the Sinjar Mount. It belongs to the disputed territories of Northern Iraq.

Tal Banat has a mainly Yazidi population. There are also about 1,400 Shia Turkmens in the village.

In August 2014, the Islamic State of Iraq and the Levant abducted more than 200 women and children from Tal Banat.

== See also ==
- Yazidis in Iraq
