= Hardan, Iraq =

Hardan حردان
- Village
- Location in Iraq
- Coordinates: 36°28′30″N 42°6′20″E
- Country: Iraq
- Governorate: Ninawa
- District: Sinjar District

Population (July 2014)
  - Total: 1,917

Hardan (Arabic: حردان, Kurdish: هه‌ردان, romanized: Hardan) is a village located in the Sinjar District of the Ninawa Governorate in Iraq. The village is located north of the Sinjar Mount. It belongs to the disputed territories of Northern Iraq. Hardan has exclusively Yazidi population.

When Islamic State of Iraq and the Levant (ISIL) attacked and captured Sinjar city and Sinjar District in August 2014, the village of Hardan was among the settlements where ISIL militants carried out the Sinjar massacre of Yazidis. Between 250–300 men were reported killed in the village of Hardan.
