= Qahtaniyah bombings =

2007 suicide car bombings in Iraq

2007 Qahtaniyah bombings
- Part of the Iraq War, Iraqi insurgency, and the Iraqi civil war
- Qahtaniyah (Iraq)
- Location: Til Ezer and Siba Sheikh Khidir villages, Iraq
- Date: 14 August 2007 (UTC+3)
- Target: Yazidis
- Attack type: Suicide truck bombs
- Deaths: 796 (+4 bombers)
- Injuries: 1,562+
- Victims: 80% of the villages destroyed or damaged
- Perpetrators: Unknown Iraqi insurgents, Al-Qaeda claimed responsibility

The Qahtaniyah bombings occurred on 14 August 2007, when four coordinated suicide car bomb attacks detonated in the Yazidi towns of Til Ezer (al-Qahtaniyah) and Siba Sheikh Khidir (al-Jazirah), in northern Iraq.

796 people were killed and at least 1,500 others were wounded, making it the Iraq War's deadliest car bomb attack.

== Tensions and background ==
For several months leading up to the attack, tensions had been building up in the area, particularly between Yazidis and Sunni Muslims (both Arabs and Kurds). Some Yazidis living in the area received threatening letters calling them "infidels". Leaflets were also distributed denouncing Yazidis as "anti-Islamic" and warning them that an attack was imminent.

The attack was possibly connected with the murder of Du'a Khalil Aswad, a 17-year-old Yazidi girl, who was stoned to death by fellow Yazidis four months earlier. Aswad was believed to have wanted to convert in order to marry a Sunni. Two weeks later, after a video of the stoning appeared on the Internet, Sunni gunmen stopped minibuses filled with Yazidis; 23 Yazidi men were forced from a bus and shot dead.

The Sinjar area, which has a mixed population of Yazidis, Kurds, Assyrians, Turkmen and Arabs, was scheduled to vote in a plebiscite on accession to the Kurdistan Region in December 2007. This caused hostility among the neighbouring Arab communities. A force of 600 Kurdish Peshmerga was subsequently deployed in the area, and ditches were dug around Yazidi villages to prevent further attacks.

== Details ==
The bombings occurred at around 7:20 pm on 14 August 2007, when four co-ordinated suicide bomb attacks detonated in the Yazidi towns of Qahtaniyah and Jazeera (Siba Sheikh Khidir), near Mosul, Nineveh Governorate, northern Iraq. They targeted the Yazidis, a religious minority in Iraq, using a fuel tanker and three cars. An Iraqi Interior Ministry spokesman said that two tons of explosives were used in the blasts, which crumbled buildings, trapping entire families beneath mud bricks and other wreckage as entire neighborhoods were flattened. Rescuers dug underneath the destroyed buildings by hand to search for remaining survivors.

"Hospitals here are running out of medicine. The pharmacies are empty. We need food, medicine and water otherwise there will be an even greater catastrophe," said Abdul-Rahim al-Shammari, mayor of the Al-Ba'aj District, which includes the devastated villages.

There were 796 people killed and at least 1,562 more wounded. And around 1,000 homes destroyed. The two villages were almost entirely destroyed. According to a rescue worker, Qassim Khalaf, Eighty per cent of the village was destroyed or damaged.

== Responsibility ==
Iraq's President, Jalal Talabani, accused Iraqi Sunni insurgents of the bombings, pointing at the history of Sunni violence against Yazidis. They were reported to have distributed leaflets denouncing Yazidis as "anti-Islamic". Although the attacks carry al-Qaeda's signature of multiple simultaneous attacks, it is unclear why they would refrain from claiming responsibility for such a successful operation. "We're looking at Al-Qaeda as the prime suspect," said Lieutenant Colonel Christopher Garver, a United States military spokesman. Al-Qaeda claimed responsibility for the attack.

On 3 September 2007, the U.S. military reportedly killed the suspected mastermind of the bombings, Abu Muhammad al-Afri.

== Aftermath ==
The same two villages were among the first Yazidi villages targeted by the Islamic State in the Yazidi genocide of 2014.

== See also ==
- Index of articles related to the Yezidis
- Yazidi genocide
  - Sinjar massacre
- List of Yazidi settlements
- List of 2007 suicide bombings in Iraq
