= The Last Girl (memoir) =

Autobiographical book by Nadia Murad

The Last Girl: My Story of Captivity, and My Fight Against the Islamic State
- First edition
- Author: Nadia Murad, Jenna Krajeski
- Language: English
- Genre: Memoir
- Published: November 7, 2017
- Publisher: Tim Duggan Books
- Publication place: United States
- ISBN: 9781524760434

The Last Girl: My Story of Captivity, and My Fight Against the Islamic State is an autobiographical book by Nadia Murad in which she describes how she was captured and enslaved by the Islamic State during the Second Iraqi Civil War. The book eventually led to the 2018 Nobel Peace Prize being awarded to Murad.

== Synopsis ==
Part I details Murad growing up in the Yazidi village of Kocho, Sinjar District, with her mother, two older sisters and eight older brothers. Murad outlines the fallout of several incidents and disputes related to nearby Sunni villages and terrorist attacks she remembered. She then describes the August 2014 occupation of Kocho by the Islamic State of Iraq and the Levant and the subsequent Kocho massacre perpetrated by ISIS. Some had escaped to the Sinjar Mountains, and the rest were kidnapped by ISIS. Men still in Kocho refused to convert and were killed, and young women were taken as sexual slaves. Murad criticized Peshmerga troops for escaping Kocho a day before the massacre.

In Part II, Murad recounts her and surrounding experiences during the Second Iraqi Civil War. Along with other women, she was transported to an institute in Solagh. She was then taken to Mosul, which had been captured by ISIS in June 2014. Yazidi women who weren't enslaved were assaulted indiscriminately. A high-ranking militant wanted to buy Murad, but she convinced a skinnier judge instead. When Murad was in Al-Hamdaniya District, she unsuccessfully attempted to escape through a window. She was subsequently raped by the guards and relocated to an ISIS checkpoint. She was imprisoned there and raped by people passing, until she was bought by someone in Mosul again. There, she successfully and easily escaped her captor, who had left the front door unlocked, and described the circumstances as miraculous.

Murad narrates her escape of ISIS-held territory in Part III of the book. After wandering Mosul for almost two hours, she approached a family for help. An escape was arranged, and, using fake identities, Murad escaped with the younger son, who the family worried would join ISIS. They successfully entered Iraqi Kurdistan, but kept their fake identities so that Murad's status as a former slave would not be politically exploited. After being unable to leave Sulaymaniyah, Murad decided to tell her story to the Patriotic Union of Kurdistan. The PUK leaked the interview, and the family who helped Murad was compromised in Mosul. Murad reunited with some of her family's members, and was waiting to learn about the rest. Her mother had been killed in Solagh, and Nadia's niece Kathrine, who had previously been turned in six times when she tried to escape, was killed in an explosive device blast which also injured Lamiya Aji Bashar. Six of Murad's brothers had been killed, and a nephew of hers had become an ISIS soldier.

== Release ==
Murad's attorney, Amal Clooney, a Lebanese-British barrister, wrote the foreword to The Last Girl.

The Last Girl was simultaneously released in the UK, Germany and the Netherlands on October 31, 2017, with rights sold in twenty other territories. According to the Associated Press, Murad noted in a statement "that she had lost numerous friends and family members to ISIS and hoped her story would 'influence world leaders to act'". The release followed the October 2017 Iraqi–Kurdish conflict.

== Critical reception ==
Writing for The Washington Post, Alia Malek stated that Murad "writes with understandable anger but also with love, flashes of humor and dignity". Ian Birrell wrote for The Times that Jenna Krajeski, the American journalist who co-authored the book, "captures Murad's tremulous voice well".

Anna Della Subin of The New York Times praised the book as a primer on Yazidi religious beliefs. Ashutosh Bhardwaj wrote for the Indian newspaper The Financial Express that Murad's book "vividly details the customs and life of Yazidism" and that she "cites instances how the Yazidi stories were misinterpreted by the Sunnis who termed them 'devil worshippers'".

Critics focused on the fact that the Iraq conflict was still ongoing at the moment the book was published. Subin wrote that the book is "difficult to process", that it contains "open wounds and painful lessons", and that it can be "co-opted for any number of political agendas". Subin also wrote that "it places Murad's tragedy in the larger narrative of Iraqi history and American intervention". According to Subin, the book is "intricate in historical context" to avoid being manipulated by sensationalism and Islamophobia. Malek had "[no] doubt [that] controlling her story was part of [Murad's] motivation to tell it in this book". However, Malek opined that Murad harshly criticized Sunni Arabs for not standing up to ISIS and classified others as exceptions to the rule.

The Evening Standard's Arifa Akbar wrote that the book "initially defers its shock", being "a history lesson" about the genocide and about her family's life, and that the latter two parts of the book "deliver true horror, and a surreal sense of Murad's parallel existence as a sex slave in a city filled with ordinary Sunni Muslim families". Malek wrote: "She takes the time to introduce Kocho and its people before the arrival of the Islamic State. [...] So when the Islamic State strikes, we know that these are real people — and we know that the stakes are high and the devastation is visceral." Bhardwaj wrote that Murad's statement, that everyone is more interested in the sexual abuse aspect of the genocide, was "[perhaps] her most damning comment" and that "[her] account [reflects] the collective guilt of civilisation".

Malek concluded her review with: "Nonetheless, Murad gives us a window on the atrocities that destroyed her family and nearly wiped out her vulnerable community. This is a courageous memoir that serves as an important step toward holding to account those who committed horrific crimes." Birrell felt that the final segment of the book was "slightly rushed", and finished his review with: "It is not always easy to turn the pages as Murad descends into hell. But this is an important book by a brave woman, fresh testament to humankind’s potential for chilling and inexplicable evil. Perhaps the ultimate tragedy is that this joins a packed library of similar tomes from the past.

== See also ==
- On Her Shoulders
