= Sinjar Academy =

Nonprofit educational institution in Sinjar, Iraq

- أكاديمية سنجار
- Formation: 2021
- Founder: Murad Ismael
- Type: Nonprofit organization (501(c)(3))
- Purpose: Education
- Headquarters: Houston, Texas, United States
- Location: Sinuni, Sinjar District, Iraq
- Region served: Sinjar, Ba'aj, Rabia and Tal Afar districts
- Website: www.sinjaracademy.org

Sinjar Academy (SA; Arabic: أكاديمية سنجار) is a nonprofit educational institution serving the Sinjar region of northern Iraq. It is registered in the United States and offers online and in-person courses to residents of Sinjar and nearby districts, including people from the area who live in camps for internally displaced persons. It provides educational services to Yezidis and other minorities affected from the 2014 genocide, and was founded in 2021 by Murad Ismael, a Yezidi activist and former executive director of Yazda.

It teaches English, German, information technology, digital media, business administration and advocacy, using online instructors and teachers at a center in the village of Sinuni. It also took part in a USAID-funded cultural heritage project that produced a curriculum on Yezidi history and customs, recruited the participants for the Ruptured Atlas mapping project, and co-authored a 2024 policy report on the Yezidi community with Yazda and the Free Yezidi Foundation.

== History ==
=== Background ===
The Islamic State attacked Sinjar in August 2014, beginning the Yezidi genocide. Yezidi students in the Sinjar region had struggled to reach higher education even before the genocide, often traveling to other districts of Iraq. Large numbers of Yezidis remained displaced in camps in the Kurdistan Region years after the attack.

=== Founding ===
Ismael launched the academy in 2021, after eight years of work with nongovernmental organizations. He has said that he wanted to help move people from reliance on aid agencies toward work that generates income.

The board of directors announced the formation of the academy in a statement published in English and Arabic. The statement said the academy would begin with virtual programs in English as a second language, information technology, business administration, supplementary secondary-school education and mentorship, along with short courses. It set out plans to build a campus in Sinjar within five years, register as a private university in Iraq, and offer four-year bachelor's and two-year diploma degrees in languages, information technology and business administration. The statement said the academy would rely on grants and volunteers to provide free education for at least its first three years and would aim for self-suffficiency through services or tuition while remaining a nonprofit. The academy describes its service area as the Sinjar, Ba'aj, Rabia and Tal Afar districts and the displaced people from them, putting the population of its service area at 800,000.

In 2021 the academy ran an online questionnaire on education, employment and skills among Yezidis and other Sinjar communities. It received 811 responses. Of those who responded, 75.6 percent were unemployed, 44.3 percent had completed a four-year bachelor's degree, 12 percent had never used a computer, and 92.1 percent said they would be interested in the academy's programs.

The academy's first courses were held online. Its first intensive course, in digital media, ran for three months onsite in Sinjar and online. The academy and the Youth Bridge Organization opened a center in Sinuni for classroom teaching, and the academy said it would make its programs available to displaced people in camps through its Moodle platform.

== Programs ==
The academy describes its method as a hybrid model. Online instruction lets educators and mentors from other countries teach courses, and in-person teaching is meant to complement it. In 2022 most students studied online because they could not afford to travel from the camps.

=== English and German ===
The English program began in 2022 and uses the British Council's English at Work curriculum, with supplementary classes taught by academy instructors. Courses cover levels A to C in conversation, writing and business English and run from three to twelve months depending on level and performance. Students attend in person at the Sinuni center or online by Zoom, and on passing each level they receive separate certificates from the academy and the British Council.

In 2022, eight students from the University of Central Florida, supervised by Tyler Fisher, taught English at the academy. They led group discussions in English and helped students make podcasts. UCF's account says the teachers spoke Kurmanji, the language most Yezidis speak, or Arabic, and that students of different ethnic and religious backgrounds discussed disputed topics, including Kurdish unity and the causes of the 2014 violence, without instructors favoring one account.

German-language courses followed, and an online German course drew 899 registrations in 2023.

=== Information technology and digital media ===
By 2022, 81 people had completed the academy's IT courses and 167 were enrolled. The courses covered computer programming, web development, artificial intelligence and digital media, alongside English lessons. Some of the programing instructors lived in displacement camps, and their salaries were paid from a grant by the Innovation Hub of Ideas Beyond Borders. The digital media curriculum was produced by Kim Polo, a filmmaker and board member. The academy's course list has also included programming fundamentals and computer skills.

=== Advocacy and transitional justice ===
The academy has offered a course on transitional justice. A course on advocacy taught by Ismael was expected to enroll 30 to 40 students. Almost 300 signed up, and more than 150 completed the full course load and received a certificate.

=== Library and publications ===
The academy runs an online library and lends books at its Sinuni center, and describes the online library as the first e-library in Sinjar. Book Aid International has sent the library several shipments of books.

In 2026 the academy sponsored Introduction to Yezidology: History, Customs and Traditions, and Yezidi Religious Beliefs, a textbook published by Al-Mada Publishing and Distribution. Its authors are Majid Hassan Ali, Rezan Shivan Aysef, Hadi Taalo Pir and Shukr Khidr Murad Al-Aldakhi. It has three sections, on Yezidi history, theology and religious beliefs, and customs and traditions.

== Projects and partnerships ==
=== Civic action project ===
In 2023 the academy and the Free Yezidi Foundation ran "Supporting Youth Participation in Civic Action", the foundation's first project in Sinjar, funded by USAID. The ten participants with the best project ideas presented them to a committee at the academy's center, and the committee chose five to present at a final pitching event.

=== Cultural heritage curriculum ===
Under the USAID-funded project Preserving Cultural Heritage of Minority Communities in Iraq, supported by the Antiquities Coalition, the academy's researchers, educators and Yezidi religious experts wrote a curriculum on Yezidi customs, traditions, history, literature and culture. Alda Benjamen of the University of Dayton, the project's research director, said the academy and the Assyrian Aid Society were writing curricula on their communities' history, language, identity and religion from the communities' own perspectives, and that she hoped public schools would adopt them. The project received a USAID award of about $1 million, followed by a second award of the same size. Two University of Dayton students, Yasmin Nassar and María Gómez, worked with the academy on a story map of Yezidi history and culture for a history class taught by Benjamen.

=== Ruptured Atlas ===
In 2023 and 2024 the academy was a partner in Ruptured Atlas, a participatory mapping project on Yezidi experiences of home, displacement, migration and return since 2014. The project was led by Sana Murrani of the University of Plymouth and funded by an Arts and Humanities Research Council Impact Accelerator Fellowship. Its other partners were Yazda Iraq, IOM Iraq and the LSE Middle East Centre.

The academy led recruitment, and 160 Yezidis from Sinjar, nearby villages, camps in Iraq and places outside Iraq signed up for seven online mapping workshops held over five weeks. The workshops ran in English and Iraqi Arabic with live interpretation into Kurmanji. Fifteen participants then gave interviews and made story maps. The academy facilitated the workshops, gave the researchers access to participants, and hosts the finished atlas on its website. The atlas went online on the tenth anniversary of the genocide, and the LSE Middle East Centre hosted a policy event on its findings.

=== HOME exhibition ===
In 2023 the photographer Yad Deen and Renas Babakir ran HOME, an online exhibition of twelve black-and-white photographs of the village of Kocho, each paired with an account by a Yezidi guardian of the village. Proceeds from print sales went through the academy, as the organizers' implementing partner, to Yezidi families who had returned to Sinjar and were rebuilding their homes.

== Research and advocacy ==
The academy works with Yazda and the Free Yezidi Foundation on advocacy in the United States and Iraq. In 2024 the three organizations published Ten Years After Genocide: The Yezidi Struggle to Recover and Overcome, a 23-page report released in English and Arabic. The report calls for an international or hybrid tribunal to prosecute Islamic State crimes, a security plan that includes Yezidis, the creation of Sinjar as a governorate, and an allocation of 1 percent of Iraq's annual budget to Sinjar and the Nineveh Plains. On education, it calls on Iraq's federal and Kurdistan Region ministries of higher education to establish a public university in Sinjar.

In 2024, Ismael for the academy, Pari Ibrahim for the Free Yezidi Foundation and Natia Navrouzov for Yazda met US Secretary of State Antony Blinken to discuss security in Sinjar and ask for US support. Their joint article published by the Wilson Center called for a US special envoy dedicated to protecting minority communities in the Middle East.

== Organization and funding ==
Murad Ismael founded the academy and has served as its president. It is governed by a board of directors that includes academics, a filmmaker, a software engineer and policy specialists, several of them Yezidis from Sinjar. Its board includes Kim Polo, a filmmaker (vice president); Hazim Avdal, a software engineer (treasurer and manager of technology); Marwan Omar, an assistant professor at Saint Leo University (director of the IT program); Nadine Maenza (manager of advocacy and relations); Veronica Harford (director of the English department); and Zeyad Ayoob Sulaiman. Ismael won a seat in the Iraqi parliament outside the quota system reserved for minority candidates in the 2025 election.

The academy has been funded by grants from foundations and other nonprofits, including the William J. and Dorothy K. O'Neill Foundation. Its projects have also received support from USAID and, in 2022, from Ideas Beyond Borders.

== See also ==
- List of Yezidi organizations
- Yazidi Cause Alliance
