= Farida Khalaf =

Iraqi Yazidi slavery survivor and author

- Born: circa 1995; Kocho, Kurdistan Region, Iraq
- Citizenship: Germany (asylum)
- Occupation: Author
- Writing career
- Pen name: Farida Khalaf
- Language: Kurdish, Arabic, German, English
- Years active: 2016–present
- Period: 2016–present
- Genres: Memoir, Non-fiction
- Subjects: ISIS, Yazidis, Slavery
- Notable work: The Girl Who Beat ISIS: My Story

Farida Khalaf (born circa 1995) is the pen name of a Yazidi woman who was abducted by ISIS as teenager in 2014 and sold into slavery as part of the Yazidi genocide. ISIS moved through northwestern Iraq and were the perpetrators of a genocide against 400,000 Yazidis, kidnapping approximately 7,000 Yazidi women and girls and forcing them to convert to Islam and were used for sexual slavery and sex trafficking. Yazidi men were murdered and Yazidi boys were enslaved to convert and become ISIS soldiers. Khalaf escaped to a refugee camp, and in 2016 published a book about her experience, The Girl Who Beat ISIS: My Story by Farida Khalaf and Andrea C. Hoffman. The U.S. version is titled: The Girl Who Escaped ISIS This Is My Story. The book co-authored by German writer Andrea C. Hoffmann, and translated to English by Jamie Bulloch.

Khalaf grew up in the village of Kocho in the mountains of Iraq. In 2014, when she was 18, ISIS invaded her village. The jihadists murdered all the men and boys of age in the village, including her father and eldest brother. Single women and girls, including Farida and her friend Evin, were forced onto a bus at gunpoint and brought to Raqqa, where they were sold into sexual slavery. She was once beaten so badly by her captors that she lost sight in one eye, and could not walk for two months. The young women managed to escape to a refugee camp in northern Iraq, and Khalaf was reunited with surviving family members.

Khalaf subsequently moved to Germany, where she was granted asylum in 2015 and hoped to continue her studies to become a mathematics teacher. Her book, The Girl Who Beat ISIS: My Story ., was published in 2016 to positive reviews.

Khalaf is the current president and co-founder of the Farida Global Organization, which was founded in 2019 and is an officially registered NGO non-profit organization in Germany. Farida Global was founded and is managed by survivors of the Yazidi genocide and conflict-related sexual violence.

Farida Global provides support to survivors and their communities through a participatory, survivor-centered approach that integrates cultural sensitivity and psychosocial principles. The organization focuses their efforts to find missing Yazidi women and girls by working with authorities to provide survivor testimonies and evidence that will bring ISIS justice as well as advocates and supports the Yazidi genocide survivors to recover and reintegrate into whatever society they have escaped to as refugees. To raise awareness, Farida Global created a traveling a photography exhibition "The Women Who Beat Isis" that has exhibited in Dubar Court at the UK Government's Foreign, Commonwealth & Development Office with the Duchess of Edinburgh in attendance, the United Nations Headquarters and The Hague

== See also ==
- Dalal Khario
- Nadia Murad
- Lamiya Haji Bashar
