= Murad Ismael =

Yazidi engineer, activist and politician

- مراد إسماعيل
- Murad Ismael in 2026

Member of the Council of Representatives of Iraq
- Incumbent
- Assumed office 2025
- Constituency: Nineveh Governorate

Personal details
- Born: Khana Sor, Sinjar District, Iraq
- Citizenship: Iraq, United States
- Party: Yazidi Cause Alliance
- Children: 1
- Education: Norwich University (M.S.); University of Houston (M.S.)
- Occupation: Engineer, human rights advocate, politician
- Known for: Co-founding Yazda and Nadia's Initiative; Member of Council of Representatives of Iraq; Leader of Yazidi Cause Alliance; President of Sinjar Academy
- Website: Official website

Murad Ismael (Arabic: مراد إسماعيل) is an Iraqi Yazidi engineer, human rights advocate, and politician. A co-founder and former executive director of the advocacy group Yazda, he was among the Yazidi activists who helped bring international attention to the 2014 Yazidi genocide and later co-founded Sinjar Academy, an educational nonprofit for Yazidi youth. In November 2025, running as the lead candidate of the newly formed Yazidi Cause Alliance, he was elected to the Council of Representatives of Iraq on a general seat outside Iraq's minority quota system, becoming the alliance's sole member of parliament.

== Early life and education ==
Ismael is a Yazidi from the Sinjar District of northern Iraq. He completed his scholing in Iraqi Kurdistan before working as an interpreter for the U.S. military following the 2003 invasion of Iraq, alongside fellow Yazidis Hadi Pir and Haider Elias. Their work as interpreters made them eligible for U.S. visas, and Ismael relocated to the United States, where he went on to earn master's degrees in environmental engineering from Norwich University and in geophysics from the University of Houston.

== Career ==
=== Response to the 2014 genocide and founding of Yazda ===
Ismael was living in the United States, along with Hadi Pir, Haider Elias, and Laila Khoudeida, when the Islamic State attacked Sinjar on 3 August 2014, beginning the Yazidi genocide. The group travelled to Washington, D.C., where they formed the Sinjar Crisis Management Team to lobby the U.S. government for intervention. Working out of a hotel room, the team, including Ismael, compiled maps of Islamic State positions around Mount Sinjar for U.S. officials; within days, President Barack Obama authorized humanitarian airdrops and airstrikes against Islamic State positions besieging Yazidi civilians trapped on the mountain.

The Sinjar Crisis Management Team subsequently became Yazda, a nonprofit organization supporting survivors of the genocide, which Ismael co-founded alongside Hadi Pir, Haider Elias, Khoudeida, Khairi Darweesh, Rasheed Murad, Abid Shamdeen, and Ajaweed Badeel. Ismael served as Yazda's executive director for four years, during which the organization opened branches in the United States, Iraq, Sweden, the United Kingdom, and Germany. In this role he travelled internationally to raise awareness of the genocide, and his advocacy contributed to formal recognition of the genocide by more than a dozen countries.

Beginning in 2015, Ismael worked with former International Criminal Court chief prosecutor Luis Moreno Ocampo and others on a campaign, "It's On U," that lobbied governments to recognize the Yazidi genocide and called on Iraq to refer the case to the ICC; the campaign supported Yazda's submission of a case against Islamic State for genocide crimes to the ICC in September 2015.

In December 2015, Ismael accompanied genocide survivor Nadia Murad to the United Nations Security Council, where her testimony brought international attention to the Yazidi genocide; he and Murad went on to travel together to meet heads of state and advocate for international support. Ismael later co-founded Nadia's Initiative in December 2015 and managed Nadia Murad's advocacy campaign for two years, work credited as having laid the foundation for her receipt of the 2018 Nobel Peace Prize. Middle East Uncovered has reported that his advocacy work contributed to genocide recognition in more than a dozen countries.

In testimony submitted to the United States Commission on International Religious Freedom around early 2021, Ismael reported that roughly 65 percent of Sinjar's pre-genocide population, about 210,000 people, remained displaced across more than 15 camps in the Kurdistan Region, with 120,000–140,000 having returned to Sinjar; he also said nearly 70,000 Yazidis had emigrated from Iraq and around 25,000 from Syria, and raised concern over a rise in suicides among displaced Yazidi women, citing more than 13 in the year to that point. He urged that aid prioritize the sustainability of Yazidi civil society organizations rather than infrastructure alone. In July 2024, ahead of the genocide's tenth anniversary, Ismael joined Free Yezidi Foundation director Pari Ibrahim and Yazda's Natia Navrouzov in a meeting with then-U.S. Secretary of State Antony Blinken to press for a dedicated U.S. special envoy for minority security and justice in Iraq.

=== Sinjar Academy ===
Ismael co-founded and became president of Sinjar Academy, a US-based nonprofit educational initiative offering online and in-person instruction in information technology, business administration, English, and vocational training, aimed at creating jobs and aiding Yazidi post-genocide recovery. He co-authored opinion pieces marking anniversaries of the genocide with Free Yezidi Foundation director Pari Ibrahim in outlets including The Washington Post and Newsweek.

=== Arrest warrant dispute (2025) ===
In April 2025, a court in Mosul issued an arrest warrant against Ismael on a charge of "insulting" Iraq's Migration and Displacement Minister, Evan Faeq Jabro, based on a complaint from her ministry; Ismael said he had received no summons before the warrant was issued, called the move politically motivated, and said he believed it was intended to preempt his candidacy in the upcoming parliamentary election. The Free Yezidi Foundation publicly condemned the warrant.

== Political career ==
=== 2025 election ===
Ismael said he decided to join the newly formed Yazidi Cause Alliance's electoral list "almost on impulse" shortly before the November 2025 election, initially intending only to support the coalition rather than run himself. He financed his own campaign with roughly $1,000 plus the cost of a plane ticket, with the remainder of the alliance's campaign, reported at under $20,000 in total, crowdfunded from small Yazidi donations; his campaign avoided the patronage networks and large campaign budgets typical of major Iraqi parties. He received close to 23,000 personal votes, among the highest totals of any candidate in Nineveh Governorate, and was elected on a general parliamentary seat rather than through Iraq's reserved Yazidi quota seat. Journalist Matthew Travis Barber reported that Ismael's election, alongside that of the separate Yazidi quota-seat winner, marked the first time since 2003 that no Kurdistan Democratic Party-aligned candidate won a Shingal-area parliamentary seat.

=== Member of parliament ===
Six months into his term, Ismael described growing frustration with Iraq's political system, saying he sometimes felt "sickened" by a system that enriches a small elite, and that international attention to Yazidi concerns had receded amid conflicts involving Iran, Afghanistan, and Ukraine. He said an estimated 190,000 Yazidis remained displaced and unable to return to Sinjar amid slow reconstruction, and that many Baghdad politicians were unaware of conditions in the displacement camps. He has participated in a working group drafting new Iraqi legislation to incorporate genocide, war crimes, and crimes against humanity into domestic law. Describing his approach to the office, Ismael said he sought to build a "balanced Yazidi policy" independent of what he called a "heavily Kurdish agenda" adopted by some past Yazidi politicians, and expressed hope for a cross-sectarian bloc of reform-minded Iraqi MPs.

In February 2026, following remarks by Turkish Foreign Minister Hakan Fidan describing the presence of Kurdistan Workers' Party (PKK)-linked forces in Sinjar and Makhmour as a threat to Turkish national security, Ismael issued a statement, as head of the Yazidi Cause Alliance bloc, describing the Sinjar file as "a fully Iraqi sovereign matter, handled exclusively within national constitutional and legal frameworks," rejecting Fidan's characterization of Sinjar as a threat to Turkey, and calling on Iraqi authorities to integrate local Yazidi forces into official state security institutions. He also raised the unresolved status of an estimated 2,700 Yazidis still missing since 2014, saying ongoing investigations into ISIS detainees, including those abducted as children, needed to continue.

Later that month, Prime Minister Mohammed Shia' al-Sudani received Ismael in Baghdad for a meeting focused on the Sinjar file, according to the Prime Minister's office, discussing service, social, and economic conditions in the district, including the return and resettlement needs of displaced Yazidis; al-Sudani said the government was committed to serving all Iraqis, particularly communities targeted by ISIS.

In May 2026, amid a dispute over the relocation of Sinjar district administrative offices, Ismael said any administrative settlement affecting Sinjar and the Al-Shamal subdistrict needed to proceed through the legitimate representatives of the local population, and said the alliance had been following the administration file closely for months in pursuit of a durable resolution.

== See also ==
- Yazidi Cause Alliance
- Yazda
- Yazidi genocide
- Nadia Murad
