= List of Yezidi organizations =

A List of Yazidi organizations.

== Iraq ==
- Yazidi Cause Alliance
- Yazidi Movement for Reform and Progress
- Sinjar Alliance
- Protection Force of Sinjar
- Sinjar Resistance Units
- Êzidxan Women's Units
- Asayîşa Êzîdxanê

== United States of America and Canada ==
- Free Yezidi Foundation
- Sinjar Academy
- Yazda
- Nadia’s Initiative

== Germany ==
- Yazidi Academy
