= 2018 Nobel Peace Prize =

Award

- Denis Mukwege and Nadia Murad
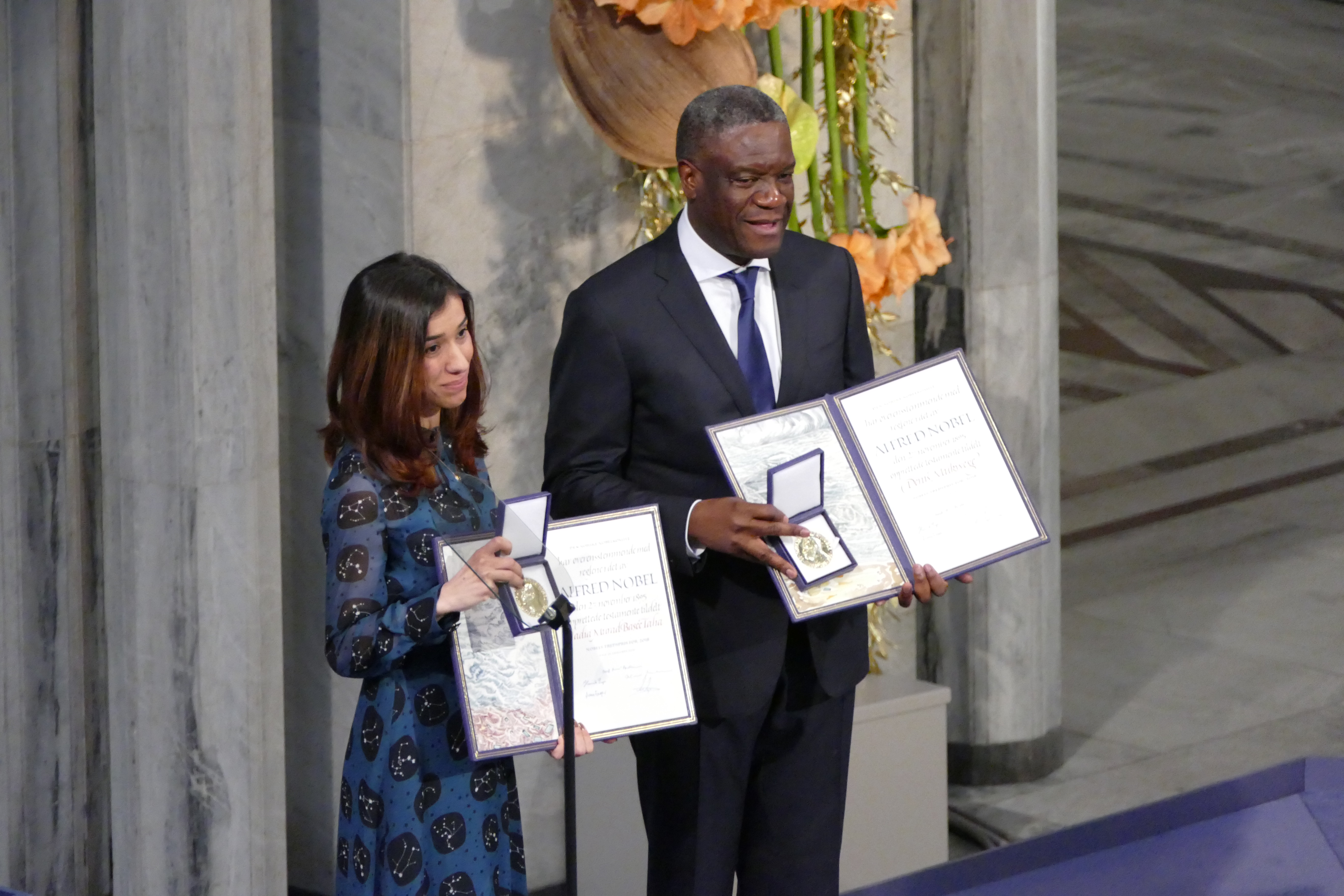
- Mukwege (right) and Murad (left) "for their efforts to end the use of sexual violence as a weapon of war and armed conflict."
- Date: 5 October 2018 (announcement by Berit Reiss-Andersen); 10 December 2018 (ceremony)
- Location: Oslo, Norway
- Presented by: Norwegian Nobel Committee
- Reward: 9.0 million SEK ($ 1.01M)
- First award: 1901
- Website: Official website

The 2018 Nobel Peace Prize was awarded to Denis Mukwege (b. 1955) and Nadia Murad (b. 1993) "for their efforts to end the use of sexual violence as a weapon of war and armed conflict," according to the Norwegian Nobel Committee announcement on 5 October 2018 in Oslo, Norway. "Both laureates have made a crucial contribution to focusing attention on, and combating, such war crimes," according to the award citation. After reading the citation, Committee Chair Berit Reiss-Andersen told reporters that the impact of this year's award is to highlight sexual abuse with the goal that every level of governance take responsibility to end such crimes and impunities.

The citation also highlighted the historic context of the 2018 award: "This year marks a decade since the UN Security Council adopted Resolution 1820 (2008), which determined that the use of sexual violence as a weapon of war and armed conflict constitutes both a war crime and a threat to international peace and security. This is also set out in the Rome Statute of 1998, which governs the work of the International Criminal Court. The Statute establishes that sexual violence in war and armed conflict is a grave violation of international law. A more peaceful world can only be achieved if women and their fundamental rights and security are recognised and protected in war."

Mukwege is the first Congolese and Murad the seventeenth woman and first Iraqi to receive the Nobel Peace Prize. Each delivered a Nobel lecture on December 10 at Oslo City Hall as part of the Nobel Peace Prize Award ceremony, which took place among main events scheduled during the December 9–11 "Nobel days in Oslo".

== Award announcement ==
Denis Mukwege is a gynecologist specializing in the treatment of women victimized by sexual violence in the Democratic Republic of the Congo, and Nadia Murad is a Yazidi human rights advocate who survived sexual slavery by the Islamic State in Iraq and published a memoir of the ordeal. "Each of them in their own way has helped to give greater visibility to war-time sexual violence, so that the perpetrators can be held accountable for their actions," reads the award citation.

Norwegian Nobel Committee Chair Berit Reiss-Andersen commented on whether the Me Too movement inspired the Committee's award decision: "Metoo and war crimes are not quite the same. But they have in common that they see the suffering of women, the abuse of women and that it is important that women leave the concept of shame behind and speak up."

At the time of the announcement in Oslo, neither awardee could be reached and informed of winning the prize. "I was in the operating room so when they started to make noise around (it) I wasn't really thinking about what was going on and suddenly some people came in and told me the news," Mukwege told Norwegian daily VG after completing his second surgery of the day, "It was so touching when I was operating and I heard people start to cry and it was so, so, so touching." "I can see in the faces of many women how they are happy to be recognised, and this is really so touching," he said when informed by phone of the news. Later addressing colleagues and supporters at the hospital, he said: "dear survivors around the world, I want to tell you that through this prize the world is listening to you and refuses indifference ... We hope that the world will no longer delay taking action in your favour, with force and determination, because the survival of humanity depends on you. It's you women who carry humanity."

"I hope that it will help bring justice for those women who suffered from sexual violence," said Murad, learning of the award while in Cambridge, Massachusetts. She said she will share her award "with Yazidis, Iraqis, Kurds, other persecuted minorities and all of the countless victims of sexual violence around the world" and will be thinking of her mother, who was slain by IS militants. Middlebury College President Laurie L. Patton wrote in an email, "This is by far the best cancellation notice I have ever had to write," when Murad had to cancel as guest speaker delivering the night of the award announcement a presentation entitled "Hope Has an Expiration Date: Exploring the Plight of Victims of Ethnic and Religious Violence in the Middle East."

== Reactions ==
Tweeted reactions began pouring in immediately following the announcement, with Human Rights Watch executive director Kenneth Roth calling it a "long awaited Nobel recognition", Secretary General of the Norwegian Refugee Council Jan Egeland calling it "the best Nobel Prize in a long time", and the government of Iraq expressing "deepest respect" for Murad. The only Yazidi in Iraq's Parliament, Vian Dakhil wrote in a statement that Murad "proved to the whole world that the will of life and peace is above the savagery of terrorism and hard-liner ideas," and Iraqi President Barham Salih tweeted that "Nadia's honor reflects the world's recognition of the Yazidis tragedy, and all victims of terrorism in Iraq." "We hope that this recognition will help Nadia and Yazidis endeavours to bring justice, peace, and coexistence", tweeted the non-governmental organization Yazda. Hussam Abdullah of the Yazidi Organization for Documentation said "this win represents the international recognition of the genocide that was committed by Daesh," referring to the Sinjar massacre in August 2014.

Among various remarks from the United Nations, UN Secretary-General António Guterres said: "By honouring these defenders of human dignity, this prize also recognizes countless victims around the world who have too often been stigmatized, hidden and forgotten. This is their award, too... Let us honour these new Nobel laureates by standing up for victims of sexual violence everywhere." And UN High Commissioner for Human Rights Michelle Bachelet said: "Nadia and Denis, I'm sure I speak for all human rights defenders, when I say we salute you, we admire you beyond words. You have fought for the pain women have suffered through sexual abuse to be recognized and confronted, and for their dignity to be restored. We need more people to stand up the way you have stood up for the rights of women, for justice, for the rights of minorities, for the rights of everyone."

Other world leaders applauding the two laureates included DR Congo government spokesman Lambert Mende, President of the European Council Donald Tusk, European Commission spokesperson Natasha Bertaud, Secretary General of NATO Jens Stoltenberg, and Chancellor of Germany Angela Merkel's spokesman Steffen Seibert.

== Laureates' work ==
Since 1999, at the onset of the Kivu conflict, Mukwege and Panzi Hospital which he founded in Bukavu have treated some 50,000 women sexually victimized and their children born of sexual violence. Journalist Nicholas Kristof recounts Dr. Mukwege's efforts in eastern Congo, since interviewing him in 2010, at repairing mass rape victims' horrific internal injuries and speaking out on their behalf at risk of his and his family's life, and Murad's efforts since her abduction and enslavement in 2014 at speaking publicly about the plight of the Yazidis especially women and girls forced into sexual slavery.

== Award ceremony ==
Since 1990, the Nobel Peace Prize has been awarded every year on 10 December, the anniversary of Alfred Nobel's death, by the Norwegian Nobel Committee chair in a ceremony at Oslo City Hall that includes the laureate's Nobel lecture in the presence of the King of Norway and royal family. The laureate receives a Nobel diploma, medal and document confirming the Nobel Prize amount.

In the 2018 Nobel Peace Prize award presentation speech, committee chair Berit Reiss-Andersen reiterated the committee's decision to award Mukwege and Murad for their respective efforts to address the war crimes of sexual violence, commending them to the "long tradition of champions of human dignity" also celebrated on this date, the anniversary of the Universal Declaration of Human Rights.

In her Nobel lecture, Nadia Murad described the plight of the Yazidi community from her own experience and yet her "hope that today marks the beginning of a new era ... to define a new roadmap to protect women, children and minorities from persecution, in particular victims of sexual violence," calling on the international community to "unite to fight injustice and oppression" and "raise our voices together" to say "no to violence, yes to peace, no to slavery, yes to freedom, no to racial discrimination, yes to equality and to human rights for all."

In his Nobel lecture, Dennis Mukwege recounted unspeakably horrific suffering of especially babies, girls and women he has treated at Panzi Hospital for mass rape and mutilation since the First Congo War, suffering "that shames our common humanity". With hundreds of thousands raped, 4 million internally displaced and 6 million killed, he said, "only the fight against impunity can break the spiral of violence."

=== Torchlight parade ===
The traditional torchlight parade in honour of the Nobel laureates on 10 December 2018 was organised by the Norwegian Peace Council in cooperation with five NGOs who work in the field of women's rights and humanitarian relief, the Norwegian Women's Lobby, the Forum for Women and Development, Norwegian Church Aid, Plan International Norway and JOIN Good Forces.

== Nobel Committee ==
Tasked with reviewing nominations from September of the previous year through February 1 and ultimately selecting the Prize winners, the Norwegian Parliament-appointed members of the Norwegian Nobel Committee at the time of the 2018 prize were listed as:

- Berit Reiss-Andersen (chair, born 1954), advocate (barrister) and president of the Norwegian Bar Association, former state secretary for the Minister of Justice and the Police (representing the Labour Party). Member of the Norwegian Nobel Committee since 2012, reappointed for the period 2018–2023.
- Henrik Syse (vice chair, born 1966), Research Professor at the Peace Research Institute Oslo. Member of the Committee since 2015, appointed for the period 2015–2020
- Thorbjørn Jagland (born 1950), former Member of Parliament and President of the Storting and former Prime Minister for the Labour Party, current Secretary General of the Council of Europe. Chair of the Norwegian Nobel Committee from 2009 to 2015. Currently regular member. Member of the Committee since 2009, reappointed for the period 2015–2020.
- Anne Enger (born 1949), former Leader of the Centre Party and Minister of Culture. Appointed for the period 2018–2020
- Asle Toje (born 1974), foreign policy scholar. Appointed for the period 2018–2023.

The Nobel Committee considered 331 nominations for the 2018 prize, of which 216 were individuals and 115 were organizations, second highest to the record 376 candidates in 2016. Odds makers' favorites included the Supreme Leader of North Korea Kim Jong-un, the President of South Korea Moon Jae-in, and the President of the United States Donald Trump for their role in the earlier 2018 thaw in North Korea–South Korea relations. The PRIO Director's "shortlist" included the World Food Programme for addressing hunger and food security; Dr. Denis Mukwege, Nadia Murad and Tarana Burke for their respective advocacies against sexual violence; SOS Méditerranée, Doctors Without Borders and the International Rescue Committee for their respective humanitarian work on migration crises in the Mediterranean region and Libya; Oby Ezekwesili and the Extractive Industries Transparency Initiative for championing anti-corruption and transparency in the link between armed conflict and extractive natural resource governance; and Reporters Without Borders for highlighting injustices against journalists reporting on conflicts and atrocities.

== See also ==
- Declaration on the Elimination of Violence Against Women
- Genocidal rape
- Genocide: Origin of the term
- UN Convention on the Prevention and Punishment of the Crime of Genocide (1948)
- Genoicide of Yazidis by ISIL: Sexual slavery
- Estimates of sexual violence
- Human trafficking
- Sexual violence in the Democratic Republic of the Congo: Ramifications
- Sexual slavery
- Sexual violence in the Iraqi insurgency: International attention
- The Last Girl: My Story of Captivity, and My Fight Against the Islamic State, an autobiography by Nadia Murad
- Transnational efforts to prevent human trafficking
- UN Action Against Sexual Violence in Conflict
- Violence against women
- Women's rights: Violence against women
