= María Ysabel Cedano =

Peruvian lawyer and activist (born 1966)

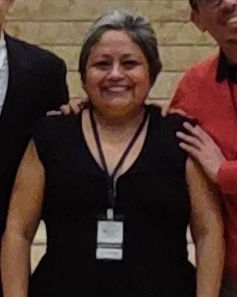
Image of María Ysabel Cedano

María Ysabel Cedano García (born July 15, 1966, in Lima) is a Peruvian lawyer and human rights activist.

== Biography ==
María Ysabel Cedano García studied Law and Gender at the Pontifical Catholic University of Peru (PUCP).

She was Director of the organization DEMUS - Estudio para la Defensa de los Derechos de la Mujer (Study for the Defense of Women's Rights) between 2004 and 2009. Subsequently, she was General Director of Women in the Ministry of Women and Social Development from August to December 2011. In 2014, she returned to the position of director of DEMUS. Additionally, she is the coordinator of CLADEM in Peru.

As an associate of DEMUS, she has undertaken projects in support of women's rights, such as programs against gender violence, access to justice, and sexual and reproductive rights. Cedano is one of those responsible for the strategic litigation against the Peruvian State before the IACHR Court for forced sterilizations that were practiced during the government of Alberto Fujimori. As a lawyer, she represents the children of two of the victims.

In the 2016 general elections, she ran as a candidate for the Congress of the Republic for the Lima constituency representing the Frente Amplio political coalition.
