= It's On U =

Campaign to draw attention to the genocide of Yazidis by ISIS

It's On U was a campaign launched in 2015 in order to draw attention to ISIS's crimes against the Yazidis and bring ISIS before the International Criminal Court (ICC) so it could be charged with genocide.

== Formation ==
In late August 2015, Luis Moreno Ocampo, former Chief Prosecutor of the ICC, Kerry Propper, financial entrepreneur, activist and producer of the documentary film Watchers of the Sky, filmmaker Taylor Krauss, and Uncommon Union co-founder Elizabeth Schaeffer Brown, traveled to Northern Iraq to support the co-founder of Yazda, Murad Ismael. The group met with surviving victims in refugee camps, Yazidi religious leaders, and members of the Kurdistan regional government, including the Prime Minister, the Minister of Foreign Affairs, Minister of the Interior, and the Office of Genocide Documentation.

On September 26, 2015, the group supported Yazda to bring a case against ISIS for genocide crimes to the ICC in The Hague. The report detailed atrocities IS fighters in northern Iraq have perpetrated since August 2014.

During this time the group launched a campaign called "It's On U" to lobby heads of state to recognize the genocide, engage key government officials, and encourage the United Nations Security Council (UNSC) to refer the case to the ICC.

== Activities ==
In November 2015, Nadia Murad teamed up with Murad Ismael and made a speech at the UNSC. This public appearance gained Nadia Murad recognition as "the face of the Yazidi Genocide." Subsequently, Ismael and Murad traveled around the world meeting with heads of state to ask for their financial and political support.

At the beginning of 2016, the "It's On U" campaign partnered with Global Citizen and RYOT to help reach over a million millennials. Signed petitions from the campaign called on Iraq to refer the case to the ICC.

In May the team traveled to London. The signatures were hand-delivered by Nadia Murad, Philippe Sands, Luis Moreno Ocampo, British MPs, representatives from Yazda, Global Citizen, and Elizabeth Schaeffer Brown to the Iraqi ambassador to the UK.

During this time Amal Clooney worked with It's On U and others to help provide pro bono legal services to Nadia Murad and Yazda. On June 5, 2016, Amal Clooney officially became counsel to them to help bring justice to the Yazidi community for the genocide committed by ISIS.

== See also ==
- Human rights in ISIL-controlled territory
