= Marwan Omar =

Iraqi-born American cybersecurity academic

- Born: 1982 (age 43–44)
- Occupations: Academic, author, associate professor

Academic background
- Alma mater: Colorado Technical University (DCS, 2012); University of Phoenix (MS, 2009)

Academic work
- Discipline: Cybersecurity, artificial intelligence, computer science, digital forensics
- Institutions: Illinois Institute of Technology

Marwan Omar (born 1982) is an American-Yezidi academic who works on cybersecurity, digital forensics and the security of artificial intelligence systems. He is an associate professor of information technology and management at the Illinois Institute of Technology in Chicago. Omar is from Sinjar, Iraq, and a board member of Sinjar Academy, a nonprofit that provides education to residents of the Sinjar region. He wrote two 2022 SpringerBriefs, one on machine learning for cybersecurity and one on malware reverse engineering, and has edited several IGI Global volumes on artificial intelligence, cybersecurity and digital forensics.

== Early life & education ==
Omar is a Yezidi from Sinjar in northern Iraq. He is a first-generation American from the Yezidi community in Iraq. He is originally from the town of Khanasor in northern Iraq. He volunteered as an interpreter and cultural advisor to the U.S. Army before immigrating to the United States, where he worked in the information technology industry and in academia. He has said he wants to be an example for underrepresented minorities in science, technology, engineering and mathematics.

Omar received a master's degree in information systems and technology from the University of Phoenix in 2009 and a doctorate in computer science, specializing in digital systems security, from Colorado Technical University in 2012. His 2012 dissertation was on smartphone security. He holds a post-doctoral degree in information science, specializing in cybersecurity, from Fernando Pessoa University in Porto, Portugal, and PhDs in cybersecurity and artificial intelligence.

His certifications are CompTIA Security+, ISACA Certified Data Privacy Solutions Engineer (CDPSE), EC-Council Certified Ethical Hacker and SANS GIAC Advanced Smartphone Forensics Analyst.

== Career ==
Before entering academia, Omar worked for Hewlett-Packard as a database developer, designing and implementing Microsoft SQL Server databases for the company's server software and hardware products. He began teaching in 2011 at a community college in Houston, Texas, where he taught computer science and introductory computer security. He was also an adjunct instructor in database and information security at ITT Technical Institute in Houston.

Omar was a full-time assistant professor of computer science and information technology at Nawroz University in Duhok, Iraq, where he taught database development, computer networks, information systems security and risk management.

He joined Saint Leo University in Florida in 2015, a year after the university began offering cybersecurity degrees, to teach cybersecurity full time. As an assistant professor of computer science, later in the Tapia College of Business, he taught in the undergraduate and graduate cybersecurity programs, on campus and online, including a graduate course on advanced penetration testing and ethical hacking. The university's Polling Institute quoted him on password habits in a December 2016 release on its cybersecurity survey and on Cyber Monday shopping in a 2018 release. He also appeared in a university video interview on cybercrime and in a 2020 episode of the university's podcast.

He has also been an adjunct assistant professor in the Department of Decision Science and Analytics in the Worldwide College of Business at Embry–Riddle Aeronautical University.

Since August 2022 Omar has been an associate professor in the Department of Information Technology and Management at the Illinois Institute of Technology. He teaches cybersecurity and digital forensics courses and is principal investigator of the department's Computer Security & Testing Lab, which works on vulnerability detection, malware analysis and secure software testing. He is an instructor for Illinois Tech on Coursera, with five online courses that include cloud computing security and data modeling. He has been a panelist in the college's speaker series on artificial intelligence and cybersecurity.

He has been a member of the IEEE since 2021 and has reviewed for IEEE Access and IEEE Transactions on Parallel and Distributed Systems.

=== Sinjar Academy ===
Sinjar Academy is a nonprofit based in Houston, Texas, that offers onsite and online courses in English, information technology and business administration to residents of the Sinjar region. It aims to help Yezidis and other communities of Sinjar recover socioeconomically from the 2014 genocide. Omar is a member of its board and director of its information technology program. He taught the academy's Artificial Intelligence Fundamentals course, which 34 students completed.

== Research ==
His research covers AI security, cybersecurity, machine learning, the robustness of natural language processing models and smartphone security. A 2012 paper with J. Wright and Maurice Dawson in the Journal of Information Systems Technology and Planning argued for antivirus applications on smartphones. In 2017 he co-wrote a paper on predicting, detecting and deterring malicious insiders with Derek Mohammed and Van Nguyen.

A 2022 survey in IEEE Access, written with Soohyeon Choi, DaeHun Nyang and David Mohaisen, reviewed advances and open problems in robust natural language processing. A 2022 workshop paper with the same co-authors examined adversarial training on language models under distribution shifts. He also posted a survey of backdoor learning in natural language processing that categorizes backdoor attacks and defenses and links to a public list of related papers, as well as a technique for detecting and removing backdoor triggers in language models, called RobustNLP. With Gita Sukthankar he presented Text-Defend, which uses the local outlier factor algorithm to detect adversarial text examples, at the 2023 IEEE International Conference on Semantic Computing.

In January 2023 he also posted two malware-detection preprints. One describes a convolutional neural network built from scratch to classify malware from image representations and reports accuracy above 99 percent; the other applies decision trees to Internet of Things malware detection using the MaleVis dataset.

With Sia Gholami he posted several 2023 preprints on the efficiency of large language models, covering pruning, synthetic training data, and whether a student model can match its teacher.

Omar is also a co-author, mostly with Ali Kashif Bashir, of papers outside security in wireless communications and IoT, including work on millimeter-wave channel modeling in vehicular networks (PeerJ Computer Science, 2023) and a federated reinforcement learning scheme for UAV-assisted IoT devices in 6G networks (IEEE Transactions on Consumer Electronics, 2024).

Since 2015 he has contributed chapters to IGI Global volumes, including on mobile device security and cyber terrorism (2015), compliance in the financial industry (2017), and malware detection, adversarial text classification and bias in AI recruitment algorithms (2024).

=== Selected publications ===
- Dawson, Maurice; Omar, Marwan, eds. (2015). New Threats and Countermeasures in Digital Crime and Cyber Terrorism. IGI Global. doi:10.4018/978-1-4666-8345-7.
- Dawson, Maurice; Eltayeb, Mohamed; Omar, Marwan, eds. (2016). Security Solutions for Hyperconnectivity and the Internet of Things. IGI Global.
- Omar, Marwan (2022). Machine Learning for Cybersecurity: Innovative Deep Learning Solutions. SpringerBriefs in Computer Science. Springer. ISBN 978-3-031-15892-6.
- Omar, Marwan; Zangana, Hewa Majeed, eds. (2024). Redefining Security With Cyber AI. IGI Global.
- Omar, Marwan; Zangana, Hewa Majeed, eds. (2025). Digital Forensics in the Age of AI. IGI Global.
- Omar, Marwan; Zangana, Hewa Majeed; Mohammed, Derek, eds. (2025). Integrating Artificial Intelligence in Cybersecurity and Forensic Practices. IGI Global.
- Zangana, Hewa Majeed; Al-Karaki, Jamal; Omar, Marwan, eds. (2025). Revolutionizing Cybersecurity With Deep Learning and Large Language Models. IGI Global. doi:10.4018/979-8-3373-3296-3.
- Wright, Jorja; Dawson, Maurice E.; Omar, Marwan (2012). "Cyber Security and Mobile Threats: The Need for Antivirus Applications for Smart Phones". Journal of Information Systems Technology & Planning. 5 (12): 40–60.
- Omar, Marwan; Choi, Soohyeon; Nyang, DaeHun; Mohaisen, David (2022). "Robust Natural Language Processing: Recent Advances, Challenges, and Future Directions". IEEE Access. 10: 86038–86056. Bibcode:2022IEEEA..1086038O. doi:10.1109/ACCESS.2022.3197769.
- Omar, Marwan; Choi, Soohyeon; Nyang, DaeHun; Mohaisen, David (2022). "Quantifying the Performance of Adversarial Training on Language Models with Distribution Shifts". Proceedings of the 1st Workshop on Cybersecurity and Social Sciences (CySSS@AsiaCCS). pp. 3–9.
- Omar, Marwan; Shiaeles, Stavros (2023). "VulDetect: A Novel Technique for Detecting Software Vulnerabilities Using Language Models". 2023 IEEE International Conference on Cyber Security and Resilience (CSR). pp. 105–110.
- Omar, Marwan; Sukthankar, Gita (2023). "Text-Defend: Detecting Adversarial Examples Using Local Outlier Factor". 2023 IEEE 17th International Conference on Semantic Computing (ICSC). pp. 118–122.
- Gholami, Sia; Omar, Marwan (2023). "Does Synthetic Data Make Large Language Models More Efficient?". arXiv:2310.07830 [cs.CL].
- Zangana, Hewa Majeed; Omar, Marwan (2020). "Threats, Attacks, and Mitigations of Smartphone Security". Academic Journal of Nawroz University. 9 (4): 324–332. doi:10.25007/ajnu.v9n4a989.
- Omar, Marwan (2023). "Backdoor Learning for NLP: Recent Advances, Challenges, and Future Research Directions". arXiv:2302.06801 [cs.CR].
- Omar, Marwan (2023). "RobustNLP: A Technique to Defend NLP Models Against Backdoor Attacks". arXiv:2302.09420 [cs.CR].
- Omar, Marwan (2023). "New Approach to Malware Detection Using Optimized Convolutional Neural Network". arXiv:2301.11161 [cs.CR].
- Omar, Marwan (2023). "Harnessing the Power of Decision Trees to Detect IoT Malware". arXiv:2301.12039 [cs.CR].
- Omar, Marwan (2023). "Detecting Software Vulnerabilities Using Language Models". arXiv:2302.11773 [cs.CR].
- Gholami, Sia; Omar, Marwan (2023). "Can a Student Large Language Model Perform as Well as It's Teacher?". arXiv:2310.02421 [cs.LG].
- Al-Karaki, Jamal; Khan, M. A. Z.; Omar, Marwan (2024). "Exploring LLMs for Malware Detection: Review, Framework Design, and Countermeasure Approaches". arXiv:2409.07587 [cs.CR].

== See also ==
- List of Yezidi people
