= Qiniyeh =

- Country: Iraq
- Governorate: Ninawa Governorate
- Time zone: UTC+3 (GMT+3)

Qiniyeh (Kurdish: Qînîçê) is a village in the Sinjar District, south of the Sinjar Mountains in the Nineveh Governorate in Iraq. It is populated by Yazidis and gained international fame in 2014 through the genocide of the Islamic State on the Yazidis.

== History ==
On 3 August 2014, about 90 Yazidis (including 12-year-old boys) were shot dead by ISIS terrorists in Qiniyeh amid the wider Sinjar massacre of Yazidis by ISIS terrorists. The Yazidis killed in Qiniyeh were traveling in a group of at least 300 other Yazidis who wanted to flee to the mountains in front of the IS terrorists. Also in the nearby village of Kojo on 15 August 2014 over 600 Yazidis were killed by ISIS terrorists.

== See also ==
- Kocho
- List of Yazidi settlements
- Sinjar
- Genocide of Yazidis by ISIL
