= Susana Chiarotti =

Argentine lawyer and women's rights activist

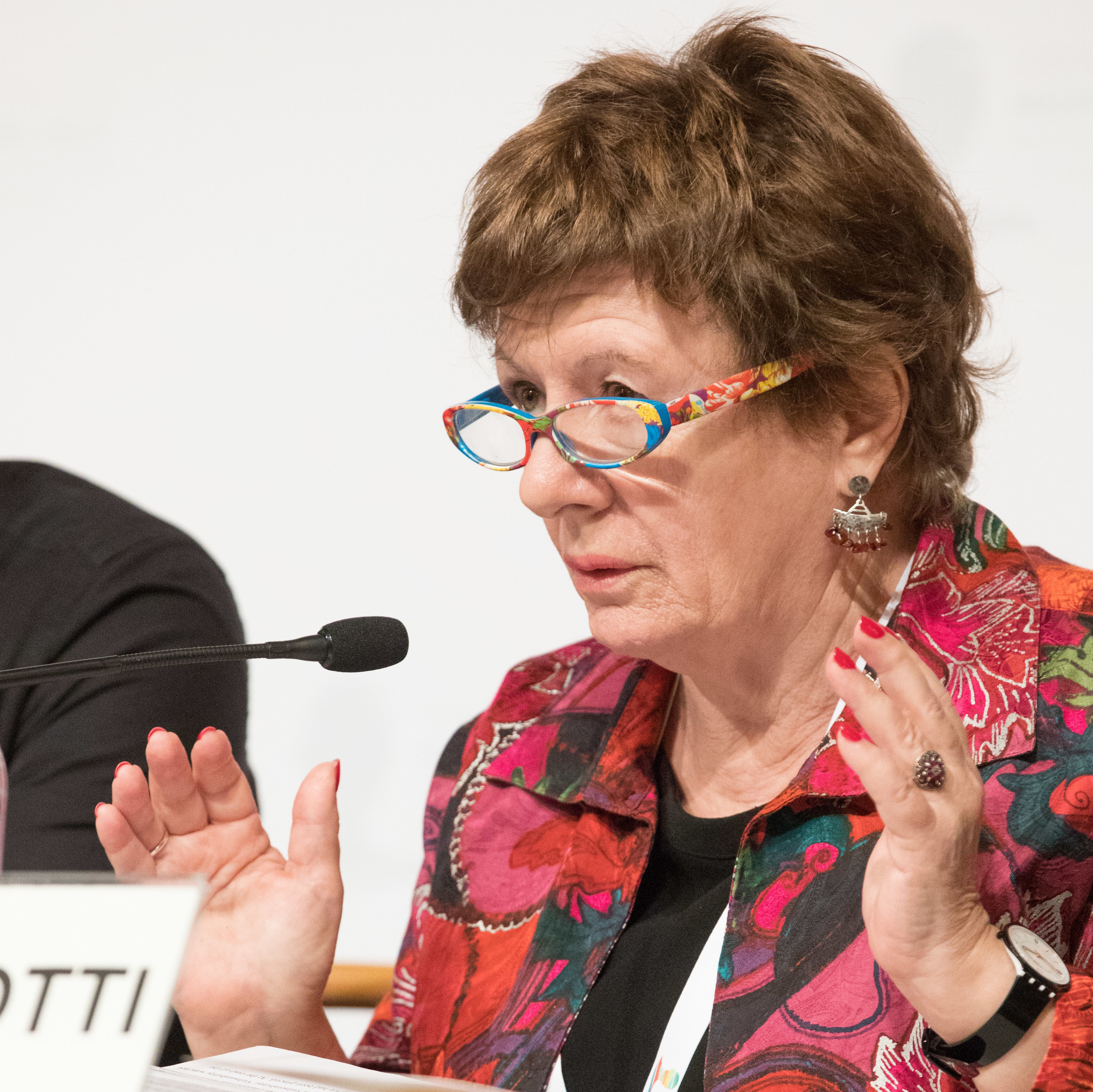
- in 2018
- Born: 1946 (age 79–80); Santa Fe, Argentina
- Occupation: lawyer
- Known for: women's rights

Susana Chiarotti (born 1946) is an Argentine lawyer and women's rights activist. She sits on the board of the Committee for Latin America and the Caribbean for the Defense of Women's Rights and reports on the state of women's rights for the Organization of American States.

== Life ==
Chiarotti was born in Santa Fe in 1946. She is a lawyer who has studied at the University of Rosario.

She says that she did not become feminist until about 1985. Before that she had seen class as the main problem in her country and believed feminism was driven by women in better developed countries.

She had lived in Bolivia whilst she escaped the dictatorship in Argentina. She returned to Rosario in 1984 where she initiated a number of human rights based organisations.

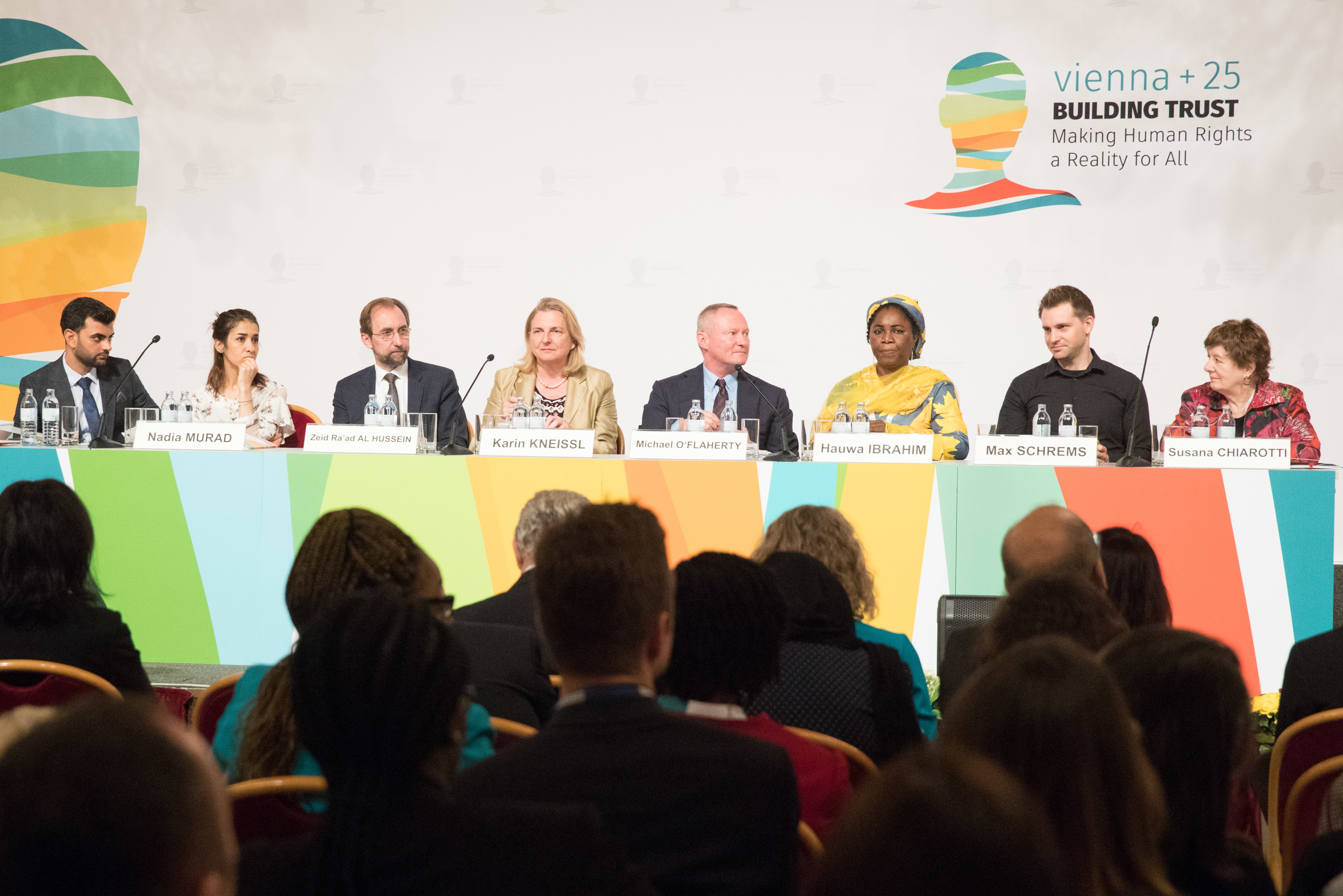
Human Rights panel in Vienna in 2018: left to right: 1 ?? 2 Nadia Murad 3 Zeid Ra'ad Al Hussein 4 Karin Kneissl 5 Michael O'Flaherty 6 Hauwa Ibrahim 7 Max Schrems 8 Susana Chiarotti

She is on the board of the "People's Movement for Human Rights Education" which is based in New York and CLADEM (Comité de América Latina y El Caribe para la Defensa de los Derechos de la Mujer; Committee for Latin America and the Caribbean for the Defense of Women's Rights). CLADEM was founded in 1987 and formally registered in 1989 in Lima in Peru.

Chiarotti works to report on the state of women's rights in Argentina for the Organization of American States (OAS). She notes that there is a lot to do but Argentina is relative to other nearby countries, Argentina is in the lead, but it is still misogynistic and androcentric. She says that over the last 30 years her country has made progress if only in that a man's power in the household was held to account. She notes that is now acknowledged that "violence against women is wrong."
