= Sexual violence in the Iraqi insurgency =

Crimes against women committed by the Islamic State

The Islamic State (IS) has employed sexual violence against women and men in a terroristic manner. Sexual violence, as defined by The World Health Organization includes "any sexual act, attempt to obtain a sexual act, unwanted sexual comments or advances, or acts to traffic, or otherwise directed, against a person's sexuality using coercion, by any person regardless of their relationship to the victim, in any setting, including but not limited to home and work." IS has used sexual violence to undermine a sense of security within communities, and to raise funds through the sale of captives into sexual slavery.

== Background ==
There is a history of sexual violence, especially when inflicted by the state, in modern Iraq. After the 1979 Iranian revolution, Saddam Hussein interned and deported 40,000 Iraqis of Shia faith. Many of these families were subjected to rape and torture while in internment camps. During the Iran–Iraq War, Iraqi secret police would sexually assault prisoners and video tape it. During the Anfal campaign, Saddam's troops raped Kurdish women. After the Gulf war, sanctions against Iraq crippled the economy and incapacitated the government; women were abducted in Baghdad and sold into sexual slavery.

The 2003 invasion of Iraq dismantled Iraqi security forces, resulting in a "tidal wave" of sexual violence. Between 2003 and 2006, upto 3,500 Iraqi women disappeared, many feared to have been sold into sexual slavery. As de-baathification disempowered Sunnis, many Sunni women turned to prostitution to survive. Under US administration, Abu Ghraib prison continued be used for sexual abuse of prisoners. Given the prison's international attention after US control, "the Islamic State of Iraq obsessively referenced the 2005 Abu Ghraib scandal to justify their gendered violence and deflect criticism of their abuses." After US withdrawal, Iraqi and Kurdish security forces continued the sexual violence of their predecessors; Human Rights Watch documented sexual assaults of women (especially Sunni women), sometimes in front of their husbands or children.

== Stated justification ==
In October 2014, in its digital magazine Dabiq, IS explicitly claimed religious justification for enslaving Yazidi women. Specifically, IS argued that the Yazidi were idol worshipers and appealed to the shariah practice of spoils of war. IS asserts that certain Hadith and Qur'anic verses support their right to enslave and rape captive non-Muslim women. IS appealed to apocalyptic beliefs and "claimed justification by a Hadith that they interpret as portraying the revival of slavery as a precursor to the end of the world." Further justification has been stated that "according to ISIS doctrine, these acts were permissible towards non-believers who refused to accede to Islam. By Islamic law, then, the women were concubines and the spoils of a jihad." The Islamic State as an organizational entity is said to have "adopted certain forms of sexual violence, including sexual slavery and child marriage, defining who could be targeted, and regulating the conditions under which such violence could be perpetrated." According to Dabiq, "enslaving the families of the kuffar and taking their women as concubines is a firmly established aspect of the Sharia's that if one were to deny or mock, he would be denying or mocking the verses of the Qur'an and the narration of the Prophet … and thereby apostatizing from Islam." In late 2014 IS released a pamphlet that focused on the treatment of female slaves. It says fighters are allowed to have sex with adolescent girls and to beat slaves as discipline. The pamphlet's guidelines also allow fighters to trade slaves, including for sex, as long as they have not been impregnated by their owner. Charlie Winter, a researcher at the counter-extremist think tank Quilliam, described the pamphlet as "abhorrent". It is further stated that "it is permissible to beat the female slave as a form of disciplinary beating, but is forbidden to beat for the purpose of achieving gratification or for torture." The New York Times said in August 2015 that "[t]he systematic rape of women and girls from the Yazidi religious minority has become deeply enmeshed in the organization and the radical theology of the Islamic State in the year since the group announced it was reviving slavery as an institution." It is evident that "the fact that IS appeared to tolerate and did not punish – to our knowledge – instances of gang rape of Yazidi women indicates that this pattern was a practice."

IS has received widespread criticism from Muslim scholars and others in the Muslim world for using part of the Qur'an to derive a ruling in isolation, rather than considering the entire Qur'an and Hadith. In late September 2014 a group of 126 Islamic scholars had signed an open letter to the Islamic State's leader Abu Bakr al-Baghdadi, rejecting his group's interpretations of the Qur'an and hadith to justify its actions. The letter accused the group of instigating fitna—sedition—by instituting slavery under its rule in contravention of the anti-slavery consensus of the Islamic scholarly community. According to Martin Williams in The Citizen, some hard-line Salafists apparently regard extramarital sex with multiple partners as a legitimate form of holy war and it is "difficult to reconcile this with a religion where some adherents insist that women must be covered from head to toe, with only a narrow slit for the eyes". According to Mona Siddiqui, IS's "narrative may well be wrapped up in the familiar language of jihad and 'fighting in the cause of Allah', but it amounts to little more than destruction of anything and anyone who doesn't agree with them"; she describes IS as reflecting a "lethal mix of violence and sexual power" and a "deeply flawed view of manhood". In response to the IS pamphlet on the treatment of slaves Abbas Barzegar, a religion professor at Georgia State University, said Muslims around the world find IS's "alien interpretation of Islam grotesque and abhorrent". Muslim leaders and scholars from around the world have rejected the validity of these claims, claiming that the reintroduction of slavery is unislamic, that they are required to protect 'People of the Scripture' including Christians, Jews, Muslims and Yazidis, and that IS's fatwas are invalid due to their lack of religious authority and the fatwas' inconsistency with Islam.

== International attention ==
An article in Foreign Policy suggests the existence of "a bias against covering rape and sexual assault, since they tend to be viewed by some as 'women's issues' versus 'mainstream' insurgent tactics." Others warn that sexual violence should not be categorized as an act of terror, because such a categorization could provoke dangerous consequences. Catherine M. Russell, Ambassador-at-Large for Global Women's Issues affirms "the de-humanization of women and girls is central to IS's campaign of terror, through which it destroys communities, rewards its fighters and feeds its evil. A coalition that fights IS must also fight this particularly egregious form of brutality." Worldwide attention focused its eyes on IS given its contrasting views to that of modern society. It is said that "the organization adopted ideologically motivated policies that authorized certain forms of sexual violence, including sexual slavery and child marriage, defining who could be targeted, and regulating the conditions under which such violence could be perpetrated."

I will follow anyone... and tell everyone... that this is happening... in the century twenty-one…

— Dr. Widad Akrawi raising awareness about the Yazidi women and girls captured by ISIL, September 2014

On September 6, 2014, Defend International launched a worldwide campaign entitled "Save The Yazidis: The World Has To Act Now" to raise awareness about the tragedy of the Yazidis in Sinjar; coordinate activities related to intensifying efforts aimed at rescuing Yazidi and Christian women and girls captured by IS, and building a bridge between potential partners and communities whose work is relevant to the campaign, including individuals, groups, communities, and organizations active in the areas of women's and girls' rights, inter alia, as well as actors involved in ending modern-day slavery and violence against women and girls

On October 14, 2014, Dr. Widad Akrawi of Defend International dedicated her 2014 International Pfeffer Peace Award to the Yazidis, Christians and all residents of Kobane because, she said, facts on the ground demonstrate that these peaceful people are not safe in their enclaves and therefore in urgent need for immediate attention from the global community. She asked the international community to make sure that the victims are not forgotten; they should be rescued, protected, fully assisted and compensated fairly. On November 4, 2014, Dr. Akrawi said that "the international community should define what's happening to the Yezidis as a crime against humanity, crime against cultural heritage of the region and ethnic cleansing," adding that Yazidi females are being subjected to a systematic gender-based violence and that slavery and rape are being used by ISIL as weapons of war." On 3 November 2014, the "price list" for Yazidi and Christian females issued by IS surfaced online, and Dr. Akrawi and her team were the first to verify the authenticity of the document. On 4 November 2014, a translated version of the document was shared by Dr. Akrawi. On 4 August 2015, the same document was confirmed as genuine by a UN official.

A United Nations report issued on October 2, 2014, based on 500 interviews with witnesses, said that IS took 450–500 women and girls to Iraq's Nineveh region in August where "150 unmarried girls and women, predominantly from the Yazidi and Christian communities, were reportedly transported to Syria, either to be given to IS fighters as a reward or to be sold as sex slaves". In mid-October, the UN confirmed that 5,000–7,000 Yazidi women and children had been abducted by IS and sold into slavery. In November 2014 the U.N. Commission of Inquiry on Syria said that IS was committing crimes against humanity. In 2016 the Commission for International Justice and Accountability said they had identified 34 senior IS members who were instrumental in the systematic sex slave trade and planned to prosecute them after the end of hostilities.

In a statement on April 21, 2021, UN Special Rapporteur on the human rights of internally displaced persons, Cecilia Jimenez-Damary, welcomed adoption by the Iraq parliament of The Law on Yazidi Survivors as "a major step towards promoting justice for crimes committed by ISIL" and expressed concern for the unaddressed situation of children born out of rape by IS fighters.

== Examples of sexual violence by IS ==
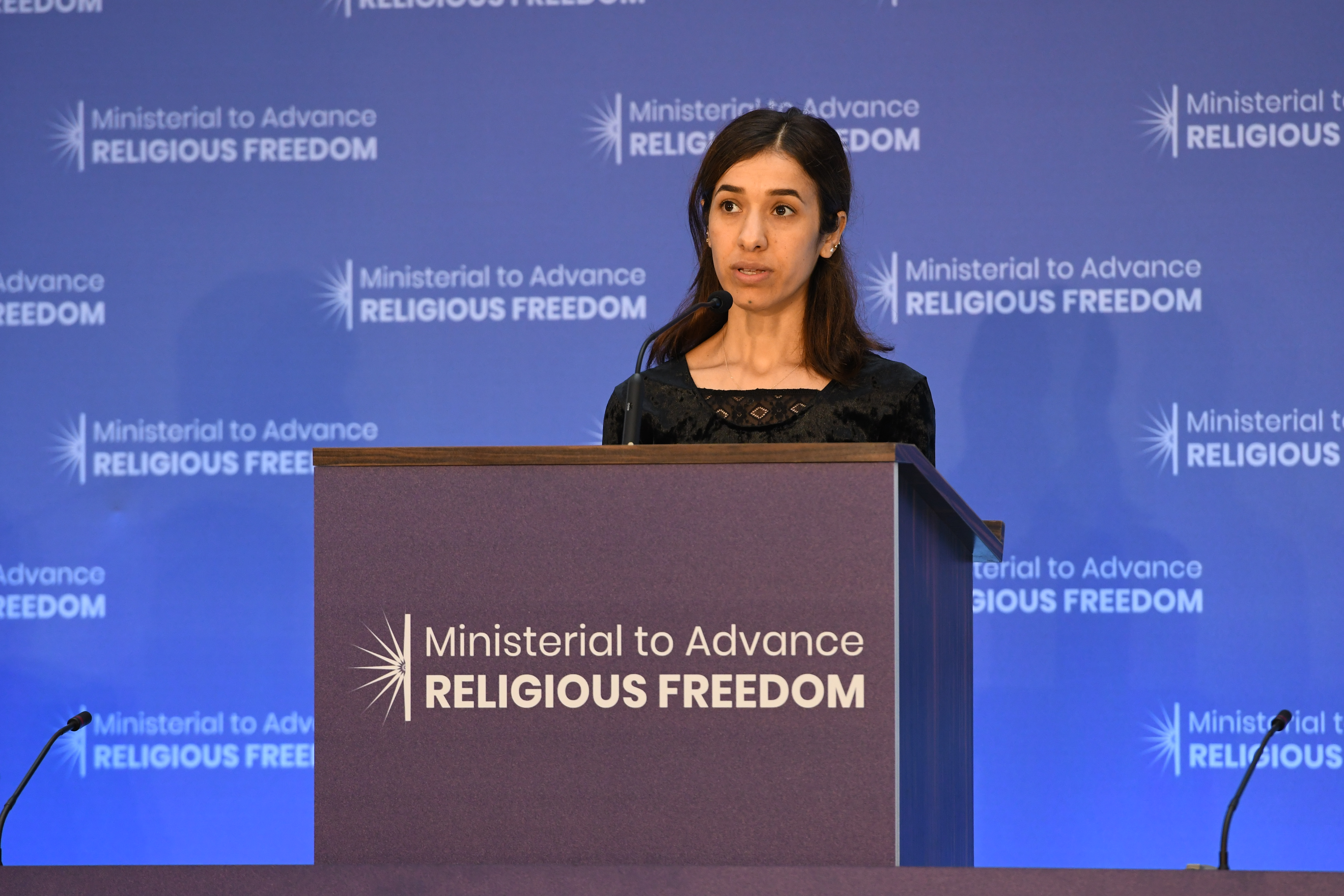
Nadia Murad, a prominent Yazidi human rights activist and survivor of ISIS' sexual slavery, delivers remarks at the Ministerial to Advance Religious Freedom at the U.S. Department of State in Washington, D.C.

According to one report, IS's capture of Iraqi cities in June 2014 was accompanied by an upsurge in crimes against women, including kidnap and rape. The Guardian reported that IS's extremist agenda extended to women's bodies and that women living under their control were being captured and raped. Fighters are told that they are free to have sex and rape non-Muslim captive women. These militants were "explicitly permitted to practice coitus interruptus with female slaves in order to avoid inadvertent insemination."

Hannaa Edwar, a leading women's rights advocate in Baghdad who runs an NGO called Iraqi Al-Amal Association (IAA), said that none of her contacts in Mosul were able to confirm any cases of rape. However, another Baghdad-based women's rights activist, Basma al-Khateeb, said that a culture of violence existed in Iraq against women generally and felt sure that sexual violence against women was happening in Mosul involving not only IS but all armed groups.

In a press release by the United Nations Iraq on August 12, 2014, representatives report "atrocious accounts on the abduction and detention of Yazidi, Christian, as well as Turkomen and Shabak women, girls and boys, and reports of savage rapes, are reaching us in an alarming manner." Instances of sexual violence appear to be increasing, with some estimates totaling 1,500 Yazidi and Christian captives forced into sexual slavery.

Amnesty International infers that IS has "launched a systematic campaign of ethnic cleansing in northern Iraq," where "many of those held by IS have been threatened with rape or sexual assault or pressured to convert to Islam. In some cases entire families have been abducted". Thus, these crimes extend beyond gender-based violence as males, in addition to females, are being targeted. In this case sexual violence is employed to achieve a political goal, religious conversion to Islam as interpreted by IS.

Yazidi girls in Iraq allegedly raped by IS fighters have committed suicide by jumping to their death from Mount Sinjar, as described in a witness statement. The sexual violence experienced by victims of the Islamic State, varying on the frequency and severity, include both physical and psychological impacts that alter the quality of life of these individuals. Evidence of "physical or health-related consequences will include trauma, somatic problems, pregnancy, sexually transmitted infections, social isolation behaviour, and sexual revictimization. Psychological or mental consequences will include the measures of suicidal thoughts, or attempted suicide, depression, post-traumatic stress disorder (PTSD), stress, anxiety, sleep disorders, eating disorders, substance abuse, self-harm, panic attacks, quality of life, and self-esteem."

Haleh Esfandiari from the Woodrow Wilson International Center for Scholars has highlighted the abuse of local women by IS militants after they have captured an area. "They usually take the older women to a makeshift slave market and try to sell them. The younger girls ... are raped or married off to fighters", she said, adding, "It's based on temporary marriages, and once these fighters have had sex with these young girls, they just pass them on to other fighters." Speaking of Yazidi women captured by IS, Nazand Begikhani said "[t]hese women have been treated like cattle... They have been subjected to physical and sexual violence, including systematic rape and sex slavery. They've been exposed in markets in Mosul and in Raqqa, Syria, carrying price tags." Dabiq describes "this large-scale enslavement" of non-Muslims as "probably the first since the abandonment of Shariah law".

The Guardian reported on September 29, 2014, that IS extended its recruitment efforts to Western females, asking them to join the movement in order to bear children for the new caliphate. Hundreds of females, predominantly between 16 and 24 years old, have been radicalized and abandoned their families, homes, and countries to join the jihad in the name of ISIL. At least one is as young as 13 years old.

The Islamic State had additionally recruited foreign fighters from around the globe to join their ranks. It is estimated that from 2013 to 2014, there were roughly 5,000 foreign fighters active in IS territory, exponentially growing to over 40,000 by the half of 2018. The social integration of IS's foreigners into the newly established Caliphate was key given how "ISIS's ranks displayed deep linguistic and cultural divisions due the recruitment of foreign fighters from around the world." IS leaders had directly used acts of sexual violence towards women as a method to mend relations between foreign and local fighters that worked to cement positive relations and cement allegiances. Evidence has shown that "while local fighters also actively took part, foreign fighters seem to have played a central role in ISIL's systems of sexual violence."

In December 2014 the Iraqi Ministry of Human Rights announced that the Islamic State had killed over 150 women and girls in Fallujah who refused to participate in sexual jihad.

Shortly after the death of US hostage Kayla Mueller was confirmed on 10 February 2015, several media outlets reported that the US intelligence community believed she may have been given as a wife to an IS fighter. In August 2015 it was confirmed that she had been forced into marriage to Abu Bakr al-Baghdadi, who raped her repeatedly. The Washington Post reported that "[t]he leader of the Islamic State personally kept a 26-year-old American woman [Mueller] as a hostage and raped her repeatedly." The Mueller family was informed by the U.S. Federal Bureau of Investigation (FBI) that Abu Bakr al-Baghdadi had sexually abused Ms. Mueller, and that Ms. Mueller had also been tortured. Abu Sayyaf's widow, Umm Sayyaf, confirmed that it was her husband who had been Mueller's primary abuser.

== See also ==
- Genocidal rape
- Yazidi genocide
- Human rights in Islamic State-controlled territory § Slave trade
- Islamic views on slavery
- Ma malakat aymanukum
- Persecution of Christians by the Islamic State
- Sexual jihad
- Sexual slavery § Middle East
- Slavery in 21st century Islamism
- Wartime sexual violence
