= CLADEM =

International network of women's organizations and activists

CLADEM (or Committee for Latin America and the Caribbean for the Defense of Women's Rights; Comité de América Latina y El Caribe para la Defensa de los Derechos de la Mujeres) is an international NGO network of women’s organizations and activists. It was established July 3, 1987 (39 years ago) in San José, Costa Rica. It was developed after discussions in 1985 at the 3rd World Conference on Women of the United Nations in Nairobi where attendees noted a need for regionally based strategies in order to boost advocacy in Latin America and the Caribbean. The organisation was formally registered in 1989 in Lima in Peru. Since 1995, it has held Category II Consulting Status at the United Nations, and since 2002, it has participated in Organization of American States matters.

== Notable members ==
Its board members include Susana Chiarotti who is an Argentine lawyer campaigning for women's rights.
