= Yazidi Cause Alliance =

Yazidi political alliance in Iraq

Yazidi Cause Alliance تحالف القضية الأيزيدية
- Leader: Murad Ismael
- Founded: 2025
- Headquarters: Sinjar, Iraq
- Ideology: Yazidi interests
- Seats in the Council of Representatives of Iraq: 1 / 329

The Yazidi Cause Alliance (Arabic: تحالف القضية الأيزيدية), often shortened to Yazidi Cause or YCA, is a Yazidi political alliance in Iraq. It was formed in 2025 by most of the country's existing Yazidi parties together with independent and youth activists to contest that year's parliamentary election as a single list, after earlier attempts at Yazidi political unity had repeatedly broken down. Running under list number 201, the alliance won one seat in the Council of Representatives of Iraq, taken by its candidate Murad Ismael, a co-founder of the advocacy group Yazda. It has since become a public advocate on the administrative status of Sinjar and on minority representation in Iraqi politics.

== History ==
=== Background ===
Since 2005, Yazidi political representation in Iraq has centred on a single reserved seat in the Council of Representatives, created after a Federal Court ruling recognising Yazidis as a distinct religious minority. Because only one seat was at stake, rival Yazidi parties tended to split the community's vote in successive elections rather than combine behind one list. An earlier attempt to build a unified Yazidi bloc, formed in 2017 in the wake of the Yazidi genocide, collapsed within about six months amid rivalries between its member parties and their outside political affiliations. In the years that followed, Yazidi-linked seats were won mainly by candidates aligned with Shia or Kurdish parties rather than independent Yazidi lists.

Ahead of the 2025 Iraqi parliamentary election, most of Iraq's Yazidi parties joined with independent and youth figures, around twenty candidates in all, to found the Yazidi Cause Alliance. Among them was Murad Ismael, a Yazidi human rights advocate based in the United States who had co-founded Yazda and spent over a decade pushing for international recognition of the 2014 genocide. When ballot numbers were drawn before the election, the alliance was assigned list number 201, the first number drawn of any competing list.

=== 2025 electoral performance ===
The alliance performed strongly among displaced Yazidis, winning roughly 10,000 votes in camps for internally displaced people in the Kurdistan Region and reportedly becoming the leading political force there. It added tens of thousands more votes among Yazidis who had returned to Sinjar, bringing its total to around 50,000, enough to win one seat through Ismael's candidacy. That seat was won outright in Nineveh Governorate rather than through Iraq's separate reserved Yazidi quota seat, which went to a different candidate, Khalid Cedo, in the same election. The alliance also drew significant support in the Shekhan district.

Matthew Travis Barber reported that the alliance's roughly 50,000 votes exceeded the combined total of all other parties in Shingal, including the KDP, and that the simultaneous election of Ismael and the quota-seat winner, neither of them KDP members, marked the first formal defeat of the KDP in Shingal in a post-2003 parliamentary election. Ismael reportedly spent under $20,000 on his campaign and received one of the highest personal vote totals of any candidate in Nineveh.

=== Post-election ===
Since Ismael took his seat, the alliance has issued a series of public statements on issues affecting Sinjar and Iraq's minority communities. In May 2026, it objected to a plan to relocate the offices of Sinjar's acting mayor and the director of Al-Shamal subdistrict into Sinjar district, warning the move could deepen the district's long-running administrative crisis if carried out without agreement from Yazidi representatives; Ismael proposed delaying the move by six months and called instead for two Yazidi administrators acceptable to local residents to be appointed. In February 2026, the alliance criticised remarks made in Washington D.C. by KRG Transport and Communications Minister Ano Jawhar Abdoka, arguing they amounted to unauthorised representation of Yazidi interests, and called for renewed attention to the unimplemented October 2020 Sinjar Agreement. In July 2026, it declared solidarity with a protest by Chaldean–Syriac–Assyrian parties in Duhok over the Keshkawa land dispute, describing it as part of a wider pattern affecting the ancestral lands of Iraq's indigenous minorities. Six months into his first term, Ismael said he had adjusted his expectations but not his goals, citing competing international crises for diverting attention away from Sinjar and the pace of reconstruction and reparations there.

=== Protest against KDP's return to Sinjar ===
On 6 May, the alliance issued a lengthy public statement rejecting any KDP return to Sinjar, holding the party responsible for the withdrawal of Peshmerga forces that preceded the 2014 genocide, accusing it of obstructing stable local administration and the return of displaced families, and warning that a return risked renewed arbitrary arrests and repression. The alliance called on Iraqi authorities and international missions to prevent the KDP's return and to pursue accountability for events since 2003. It organised demonstrations in Snune on 13 May, at which a shortened version of the statement was read publicly; the YBŞ-affiliated People's Council of Shingal issued a supporting statement, and diaspora Yazidis held a follow-up demonstration in Düsseldorf, Germany, on 30 May. Following the alliance's call for demonstrations, Iraqi authorities halted the attempted return.

== Ideology ==
The alliance describes itself as an independent political alliance. Its public statements have focused on Yazidi political representation, the administrative status of Sinjar, minority land rights, and accountability for the 2014 genocide.

In its founding statement, the alliance described itself as committed to communitarian politics "free from narrow personal interests or external influences," and identified formal recognition of the 2014 genocide, rehabilitation of survivors, and preservation of Yazidi heritage among its core objectives. It has also positioned itself against Iraq's minority quota system by contesting general parliamentary seats rather than the reserved Yazidi quota seat, which analysts have described as vulnerable to capture by larger, non-Yazidi-aligned political blocs.

== See also ==
- Yazidis in Iraq
- Yazidi Movement for Reform and Progress
- Yazda
