= Nawroz University =

University in the Kurdistan Region of Iraq

- زانکۆیا نەورۆز
- Other name: NU
- Motto: A future as bright as Nawroz
- Number of colleges: 7
- Type: Private
- Established: July 20, 2004
- Founder: Syndicate of Economists in Duhok Governorate
- Parent institution: Vision Education
- Accreditation: Ministry of Higher Education and Scientific Research (Kurdistan Region)
- Religious affiliation: None
- Chairman: Idris Nechirvan Barzani
- President: Asst. Prof. Dr. Mevan Arif Abdulrahman
- Vice-president: Prof. Dr. Hoger Taher Tawfiq (Administrative, Financial, and Student Affairs) and Prof. Dr. Muayad Aghali Merza (Scientific Affairs)
- Location: Tanahi Quarter, Duhok - Kurdistan Region of Iraq, Duhok, Duhok Governorate, Iraq; 37.05797°N 43.16933°E
- Campus: ~ 74805 m2; Urban
- Language: Kurdish, Arabic, English
- Formerly known as: Duhok University College
- Website: nawroz.edu.krd
- apply.nawroz.edu.krd/images/logo.webp
- Location in Iraq

Nawroz University is a private university located in the Kurdistan Region of Iraq.

Nawroz University is a higher education private university founded on July 20, 2004. It consists of twenty three academic departments at seven colleges. Initially named Duhok University College, the institution was founded in 2004 by the Syndicate of Economists in Duhok Governorate, with the approval of the Prime Minister of Kurdistan Region. The university began accepting students on 20 July 2004, and teaching began on 1 December 2004, based on resolution 3/2 of the Consultation Committee of the Ministry of Higher Education and Scientific Research in the Kurdistan Region.

Duhok University College expanded, and in 2009 it was renamed Nawroz University, in accordance with decision 2854 of the Council of Ministers.

The university includes seven colleges:

- College of Economics & Administration
- College of Law and Political Science
- College of Science
- College of Languages
- College of Engineering
- College of Engineering
- College of Dentistry
- College of Pharmacy
