= Nadia's Initiative =

Non-profit organization for survivors of sexual violence

- Abbreviation: NI
- Formation: 2018; 8 years ago
- Founder: Nadia Murad
- Type: 501(c)(3)
- Purpose: Human Rights, Education, Healthcare, Livelihoods, Ending Human Trafficking, Stopping Genocide of Yazidis by ISIS
- Method: Donations, Grants
- Key people: Nadia Murad (President & Chairwoman); Abid Shamden (Special Advisor); Kerry Propper (Vice Chairman of the Board); Elizabeth Bohart (Strategic Advisor)
- Website: nadiasinitiative.org

Nadia’s Initiative is a nonprofit organization founded in 2018 by Nadia Murad that advocates for survivors of sexual violence and aims to rebuild communities in crisis. The launch of this organization was prompted by the Sinjar massacre, a religious persecution of the Yazidi people in Sinjar, Iraq by ISIS in 2014.

== History ==
Murad, a survivor of the Sinjar massacre who escaped ISIS capture, created Nadia’s Initiative in January 2018 to "provide long term, holistic approaches to healing traumatized victims of mass atrocities, by developing and supporting field programs in the areas of healthcare, psychosocial support, and education for women and children" and "countering global terrorism through public awareness."

In 2017, as part of the goal to counter terrorism, Nadia Murad pressured the United Nations Security Council to launch an investigation into the actions of ISIS against the Yazidi people. The result, UN Resolution 2379, was passed on 21 September 2017 and "authorized the creation of an independent team to investigate crimes committed by ISIL in Iraq ... this team is designed to investigate and preserve evidence relating to genocide, war crimes, and crimes against humanity. This is to aid in bringing charges against those responsible for such atrocities."

In January 2018, Nadia’s Initiative undertook an assessment of Sinjar to better understand the obstacles delaying redevelopment efforts and document the current state of the region. The report identifies projects for redevelopment, such as reconstructing facilities, communication networks, education & healthcare infrastructures, and establishing economic opportunities for returnees.

With many active landmines in the Sinjar region, de-mining the area was the first priority for the foundation.

In July 2018, Nadia's Initiative announced that after several months of work, de-mining operations in Sinuni, a sub-district in the Yazidi homeland of Sinjar, had been restarted. The Initiative stated, "This important effort ... will help to ensure the survival of the Yazidi community."

With most de-mining efforts already successfully completed, Nadia's Initiative has now shifted focus to large scale sustainable development initiatives to provide much needed services to returnees in the Sinjar region. These initiatives focus on health, education, livelihoods, women's empowerment, and WASH (water, sanitation, and hygiene).

== Ongoing work ==
The first priority of the Initiative is rebuilding the Yazidi ancestral homeland of Sinjar to restore services and infrastructure to those who have returned to the region and incentivize the return of those still displaced.

Nadia’s Initiative works with the local Yazidi community and a variety of implementing partners on the ground in Sinjar to design and support projects that promote the restoration of education, healthcare, livelihoods, WASH (water, sanitation and hygiene), culture, and women’s empowerment in the region. All Nadia’s Initiative programs are community-driven and survivor-centric, and work to promote long term peace-building. Nadia’s Initiative advocates governments and international organizations to support efforts to rebuild Sinjar, seek justice for Yazidis, improve security in the region, and support survivors of sexual violence worldwide.

Nadia’s Initiative is uniquely positioned to facilitate the re-development of Sinjar due to its extensive knowledge and understanding of the political, cultural, and economic complexities of the region. Nadia’s Initiative brings a comprehensive peace-building approach to the process of rebuilding and recognizes that reconstruction efforts must be developed locally - local solutions to local problems. This type of approach will empower survivors and re-establish a sense of community in the region. Nadia’s Initiative strongly believes in making survivors, particularly women and children, an active voice in the peace-building process.

As of 2021, Nadia's Initiative's programs are projected to directly benefit over 150,000 returnees to the region.

=== Connections with other organizations ===
In October 2018, Nadia's Initiative announced that it was "grateful to The Big Heart Foundation for supporting its work to engage global leaders in peace building initiatives to rebuild Sinjar." The Big Heart Foundation was formed to support people in need by providing healthcare, education, and emergency aid services.

Nadia's Initiative stated that it established a partnership with Mines Advisory Group (MAG), an organization that seeks to "find and destroy landmines, cluster munitions and unexploded bombs in places affected by conflict in order to assist in de-mining Sinjar."

Since 2019, Nadia's Initiative has partnered with a variety of implementing partners on the ground in Sinjar including USAID, IOM Iraq, Dorcas Aid International, Mission East, La Chaine De L'espoir, and a variety of local NGOs.

== Funding ==
The co-recipient of the 2018 Nobel Peace Prize, Nadia Murad, donated her prize winnings of $500,000 to support Nadia's Initiative.

Director of "On Her Shoulders" — a film based on Murad's work as an activist, Alexandria Bombach, announced that the $25,000 prize she received from the Heartland Film Festival will be donated to Nadia's Initiative.
