= Lamiya Haji Bashar =

Yazidi human rights activist

- لمياء حجي بشار
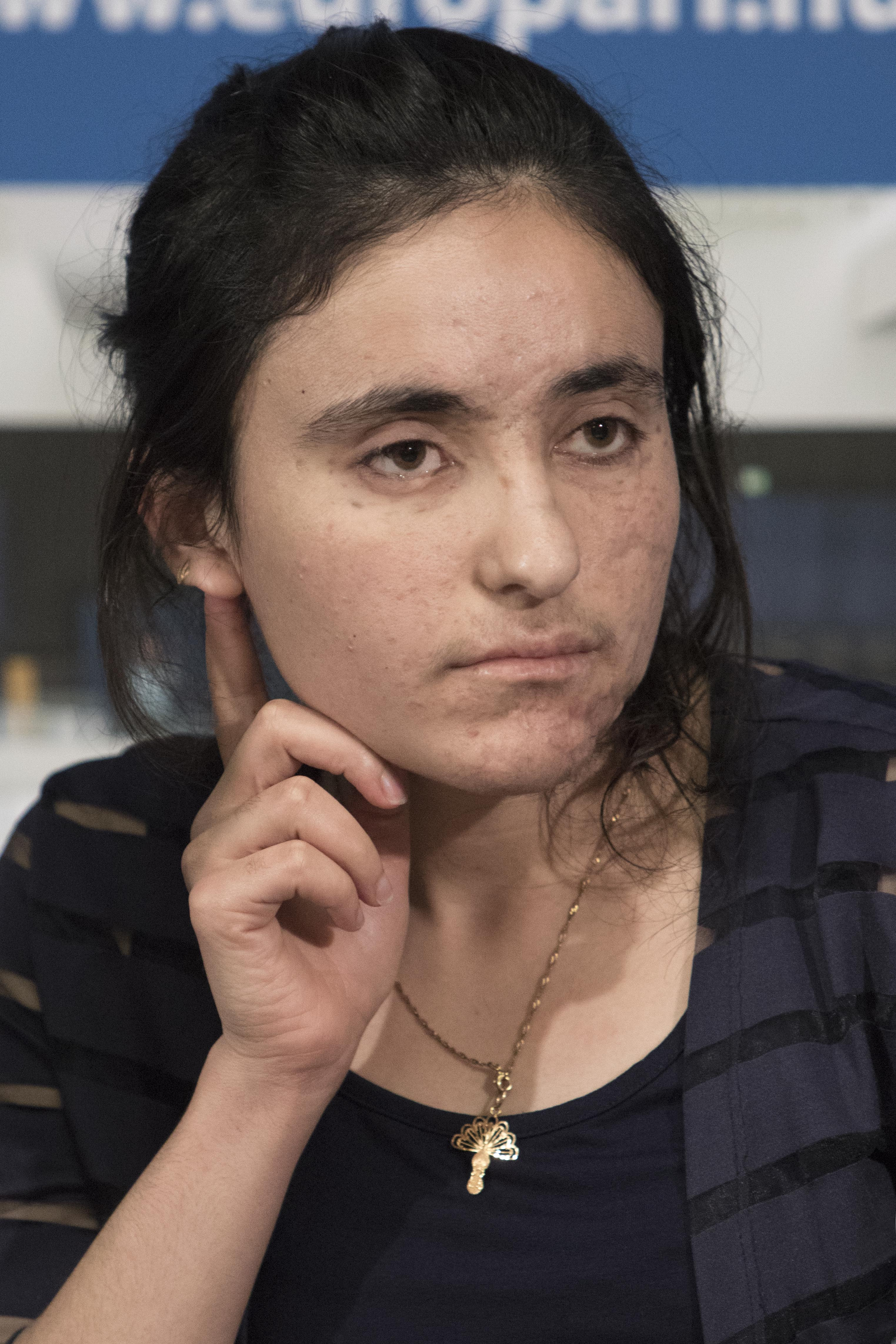
- Haji Bashar in 2017
- Born: Lamiya Haji Bashar; 1998 (age 27–28); Kocho, Iraq
- Citizenship: Germany
- Occupation: Human rights activist
- Years active: 2014–present
- Known for: Human rights activism, Sakharov Prize winner
- Awards: Sakharov Prize (2016)

Lamiya Haji Bashar (Arabic: لمياء حجي بشار) is a Yazidi human rights activist. She was awarded the Sakharov Prize jointly with Nadia Murad in 2016.

== Biography ==
Haji Bashar is from Kocho, near Sinjar, Iraq. In August 2014, along with Nadia Murad, she was abducted by Islamic State from the village and forced into sexual slavery. She was also forced to make suicide vests. She was sixteen years old at the time.

Aided by her family who paid local smugglers, she escaped in April 2016, being injured by a land mine in the process. The explosion scarred her face. She received medical treatment in Germany. In October 2016, she and Murad were jointly awarded the Sakharov Prize; the ceremony took place in December 2016.

== See also ==
- Genocide of Yazidis by ISIL
