= Kocho, Iraq =

Kocho
- Village
- Kocho within Iraq
- Coordinates: 36°10′N 41°44′E
- Country: Iraq
- Governorate: Ninawa
- District: Sinjar District
- Time zone: UTC+3 (GMT+3)

Kocho (Kurdish: کۆچۆ, romanized: Koço; Arabic: كوجو) is a village in Sinjar District, south of the Sinjar Mountains in the Nineveh Governorate of Iraq. It is considered one of the disputed territories of Northern Iraq and is populated by Yazidis. The village came to international attention in 2014 due to the genocide of Yazidis committed by the Islamic State.

== Genocide in Kocho ==
=== Background ===
Iraqi forces withdrew from Sinjar region including the village of Kocho after the Fall of Mosul in early June 2014, prompting the lightly-equipped and outgunned Peshmerga to enter Sinjar city to prevent ISIS from capturing the city. Peshmerga began constructing a barrier south of the city to prevent ISIS incursions. The region experienced small-scale attacks from ISIS between June and August that year and the small contingent of Peshmerga soldiers in Kocho would ultimately leave to reinforce other Peshmerga forces northward due to the ISIS advance. Hundreds of locals left towards the Sinjar Mountains afterwards to seek refuge and were later rescued by People's Protection Units while some were reported to be caught by ISIS.

=== Genocide ===
On 3 August 2014, the Islamic State took control of the whole village and the town was captured by Iraqi forces and Êzîdxan Protection Force on 25 May 2017.

The Islamic State imprisoned Yazidis for 12 days and then gave the Yazidis an ultimatum of three days to convert to Islam or face death. Since the Yazidis refused to convert to Islam, the massacre started on the 15 August 2014. The Islamic State separated the men from the women and children and took them all to the secondary school of the village, where the Yazidis had to hand over their mobile phones and jewelry. An estimated 1826 Yazidis lived in the village of Kocho. The Islamic State beheaded about 600 Yazidi men, and some were burned alive or shot. The bodies of the people, including some who were alive, were all thrown into mass graves. Subsequently, the Islamic State abducted more than 1,000 Yazidi children and women from the village. The under-14s were taken to Islamic State military camps where they were trained to become IS terrorists, and the Yazidi women and girls were held as slaves and sexually abused. In the wider Sinjar massacre, Islamic State militants previously shot dead 90 Yazidis (including 12-year-old boys) in the neighboring village of Qiniyeh on 3 August 2014.

On 25 January 2015, some members on the Yazidi community retaliated against their Arab neighbors in response to the massacre.

=== Aftermath ===
In March 2019, mass grave exhumations began in Kocho.

== Notable Persons ==
- Nadia Murad
- Lamiya Haji Bashar

== Bibliography ==
- Kocho: ISIS Massacre in a Yezidi Village (Paul Kingery, 05.10.2018) ISBN 978-1726768993
