= Yazda =

American Yazidi nonprofit

- يزدا
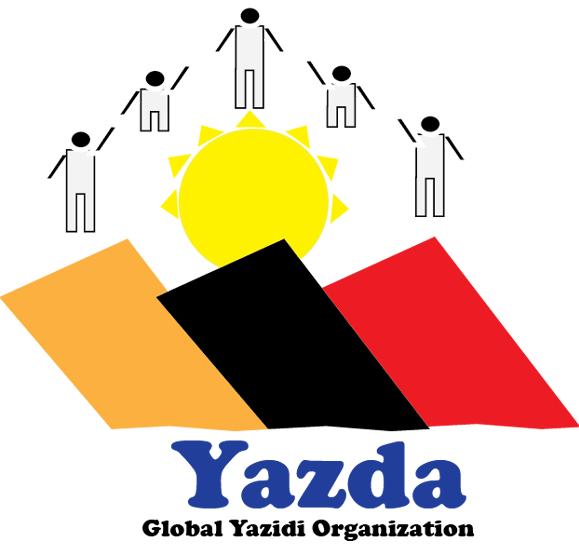
- Formation: August 28, 2014; 12 years ago
- Founded at: Texas U.S.
- Type: Nonprofit organization Non-governmental organization (NGO)
- Purpose: Humanitarian; Activism; Advocacy; Prevent Genocide
- Headquarters: United States; United Kingdom; Iraq; Sweden
- Location: Global
- Leader: Natia Navrouzov
- Website: Yazda.org

Yazda: Global Yazidi Organization (/ˈjɑːzdə/, Arabic: يزدا; Kurdish: یەزدا, Yazda), is a United States-based global Yazidi nonprofit, non-governmental organization (NGO) advocacy, aid, and relief organization. Yazda was established to support the Yazidi, especially in northern Iraq, specifically Sinjar and Nineveh Plain, and northeastern Syria, where the Yazidi community has, as part of a deliberate "military, economic, and political strategy," been the focus of a genocidal campaign by ISIL that included mass murder, the separation of families, forced religious conversions, forced marriages, sexual assault, physical assault, torture, kidnapping, and slavery.

== History ==
In August 2014, Yazda was founded by a group of Yazidi and Yazidi American activists in the United States centered around Yazidi communities in Lincoln, Nebraska, and Houston, Texas.

In addition to education initiatives that explain Yazidi culture and religion, Yazda runs a Yazda's Center in Kurdistan Region, and assists victims of the genocide and rape that began in Iraq in 2014.

The first mission of Yazda was advocating in the United States during ISIL's attack on Sinjar. Yazda helped by providing humanitarian assistance in the form of food and water to approximately 60,000 Yazidis, who were stranded on mountain Sinjar by ISIL during the week of August 3, 2014. At this point, Yazda began its work trying to locate and help free Yazidi women and girls, more than 3,200 of whom were captured, enslaved, and are still held hostage by the Islamic State. Those women and girls are victims of human trafficking and sexual slavery.

Yazda's center in Iraq functions as a local non-governmental organization (NGO).

Yazda sponsored multiple online petitions to focus on helping captured and enslaved Yazidi women. Activists working with Yazda asked U.S. President Barack Obama to help the women and girls still held captive. A Yazidi high school student from Coventry, England, who relocated to the UK from Iraq, asked U.K. Prime Minister and Home Secretary Theresa May, Secretary of State for International Development Justine Greening, and Secretary of State for Foreign and Commonwealth Affairs Philip Hammond, for a meeting to discuss providing solutions to the crisis.

In August 2015, Luis Moreno Ocampo, former Prosecutor of the International Criminal Court, activist Kerry Propper, and multi-media communication specialist Elizabeth Schaeffer Brown, came to the Yazda Center in Dohuk, Kurdistan, to gather testimony and record victim statements. They proceeded to launch It's On U, a lobbying campaign to pressure heads of state and UN Security Council members to refer the Yazdi genocide to the ICC.

=== International Criminal Court ===
On September 25, 2015, Yazda and Free Yazidi Foundation, with the support of the Kurdish Regional Government of Iraq, submitted a detailed report to the International Criminal Court (ICC) that explains how ISIL, with a disproportionate number of foreign fighters, committed genocide against the Yazidi people. The report requested a formal investigation into the crimes of the Islamic State (ISIS) to be conducted by the international community to prosecute ISIL for the crime of genocide against Yazidis. Because Iraq is not a signatory of the Rome Statute of the International Criminal Court (ICC), there is a limitation to the assistance the ICC can provide. One option would be that the ICC could be granted limited jurisdiction over the region.

=== Nadia Murad ===
Yazda provides assistance and support to the Yazidi activist, Nadia Murad, a Yazidi human rights activist, Nobel Peace Prize winner and since September 2016 the first Goodwill Ambassador for the Dignity of Survivors of Human Trafficking of the United Nations. She was kidnapped and held by the Islamic State in August 2014. On December 16, 2015, Murad testified about her experience before the United Nations Security Council.

In September 2016, Attorney Amal Clooney spoke before the United Nations Office on Drugs and Crime (UNODC) to discuss the decision she made in June 2016 to represent Yazidi activist Nadia Murad as a client in legal action against ISIL commanders.

=== Organization ===
Yazda is run by teams of volunteers in the United States, United Kingdom, Sweden, Germany, and Iraq. A large portion of the volunteers emigrated after working as translators during the 2003 invasion of Iraq and in other conflicts that involved the U.S. military. Chicago graduate student, Matthew Barber, was Executive Director for a period of one year. Murad Ismael, Haidar Elias, Hadi Pir, Khairi Darweesh, Laila Khoudeida, Rasheed Murad, Abid Shamdeen, and Ajaweed Badeel are the co-founders of Yazda, and its current Executive Director is Natia Navrouzov.

== Projects ==
Yazda supports survivors of the Yazidi genocide through numerous aid and relief programs. Yazda has a Medical Center in Iraq and supports thousands of people in need of primary medical care and first aid services. Yazda also has a mobile clinic in Sinjar to support the Yazidis in the remote areas and villages around Sinjar. Yazda conducts missions to provide humanitarian aids and relief services of clean water, clothing, and food to as many displaced people as possible.

=== Genocide documentation ===
The genocide documentation project started on October 17, 2014. Yazda worked with the Voices of Rwanda, an organization that has been documenting Rwanda's genocide, to train and support Yazda's documentation team. The team works on recording Yazidi survivors and eyewitness testimonies of the genocidal campaign. The team locates and investigates the mass graves of Yazidis.

In 2016, Yazda and Human Rights Watch issued an official report regarding the discovered mass graves.

Regarding this matter, Yazda had urged the international community to formally investigate the mass graves before evidence was lost at those sites because Sinjar is still a war zone and the sites of genocide are unprotected. The team also investigates the general devastation of the Yazidi community and damage of Yazidi properties following ISIL's attack, and has worked in support of assisting media to document the story.

=== Psycho-social support and Women's Center ===
Yazda began a psycho-social program in its center in Dohuk, Iraq, for the Yazidi women and girls who managed to escape or are rescued from ISIL. The women and girls suffer from severe physical and mental abuse and require post-trauma support. Yazda helps them recover from the trauma and reintegrate into society via response programs to help the women with methods that include individual therapy and often require long-term treatment.

ISIL's genocidal campaign against the Yazidis resulted in the abduction and enslavement of thousands Yazidis, the majority of which were women and girls. Yazda volunteers and the office of Yazidi affairs in Kurdistan have collected the names of approximately 5,000 abducted Yazidis after the genocidal campaign. These abductees were subjected to systematic sexual abuse and rape, and those who still held hostage face the same daily abuses even to the present day. By the beginning of 2016, over 2,000 abducted Yazidi women and girls returned to freedom, either by escaping or by being rescued. Many cases of rescue or escape involve women and girls being reunited with destitute families in the rough conditions of Internally Displaced Person (IDP) camps or squalid conditions of other locations where displaced families have taken refuge. Some escapees have lost all relatives to ISIL's massacres and did not have immediate families to return to. Through its case management program, Yazda has collected the information of more than 800 women and girls that have escaped ISIL individually.

In addition to psycho-social therapy, Yazda provides survivors with shelter, food, clothing, fuel, and other basic necessities. Yazda aims is to create an environment that is conducive to the healing of trauma survivors. Yazda provides medical and psychological treatment to help them recover from the damage they have experienced. Yazda struggles to provide adequate psycho-social resources and medical services to the survivors.

=== Yazda medical mission ===
==== The Essyan Camp Primary Health Care Center ====
Yazda opened a medical clinic in the Esseyan camp to provide the displaced Yazidis with basic medical care. Yazda has managed to support the people in need with primary care services with the support of the Health Directorate of Dohuk. Through an agreement with the Kurdistan Regional Government's Department of Health, Yazda has the responsibility of providing all medical services to the population of the Essyan IDP camp. The population of the camp exceeds 14,600 people. Yazda maintains a physical health center, and has a staff of 17-member team of nurses, pharmacists, physician’s assistants, and lab assistants, in addition to several doctors. Yazda’s sources of funding are the donations from private donors and organizations.

==== Mount Sinjar Mobile Medical Clinic ====
Yazda had established a mobile clinic to serve the displaced Yazidis who still live on the Sinjar mountain area. According to Yazda, Yazda's mobile clinic plays a significant role in covering the needs of the people in remote areas of Sinjar and surrounding villages with a population of around 30,000 people. The German charitable organization, Zentralrat der Yeziden in Deutschland, provided an ambulance for the mission and sent medication and medical supplies.

==== Public Health Education Campaign ====
Yazda works to educate and provide outreach on proper food sanitation procedures to reduce instances of foodborne illness, provides first aid education from within populations at internally displaced person (IDP) camp and provide basic instructions on emergency response for instances where trained medical professional assistance is not available.

=== Aid work ===
Yazda provides food, water, clothes, and other necessities for the orphans of escaped women, and other people in need in IDP camps. The focus is on assisting the displaced Yazidi, which is estimated to be more than 90% of Iraq's original Yazidi population.

=== Tîrêja Rojê (Ray of the Sun): Preservation of Yazidi culture and religion ===
Tîrêja Rojê is Yazda’s project for the preservation of the Yazidi religious and cultural tradition. The project involves sharing historical traditions and cultural knowledge by older generations to younger generations. It also provides psychological therapy to help the displaced Yazidis recover from genocide trauma.

=== Qalam Zerin (Golden Pen) ===
Qalam Zerin is a project run the Yazidi poet, Murad Allo, that provides Yazidi university students mentorship and support in the form of weekly meetings on topics that include languages classes, public speaking, writing, and maintaining physical health. The project focuses on rehabilitating Yazidi youth through activities that include oral lectures, paintings, poetry, writing classes, and various cultural activities to treat collective trauma for the Yazidi society through the youth.

=== Education and support for children ===
Yazda provides assistance to children visiting the Yazda Women's Center in Duhok, with planned outreach for displaced children who need sponsorship and adoption services, direct aid, and trauma, medical, and education support.

== See also ==
- Nadia Murad
- Yazidis
- List of Yazidi settlements
- Êzîdxan Protection Force
- Genocide of Yazidis by ISIL
- Sinjar massacre
- Chibok girls
- List of Yazidi organizations
