= Nadia Murad =

Yazidi human rights activist

- نادیە موراد
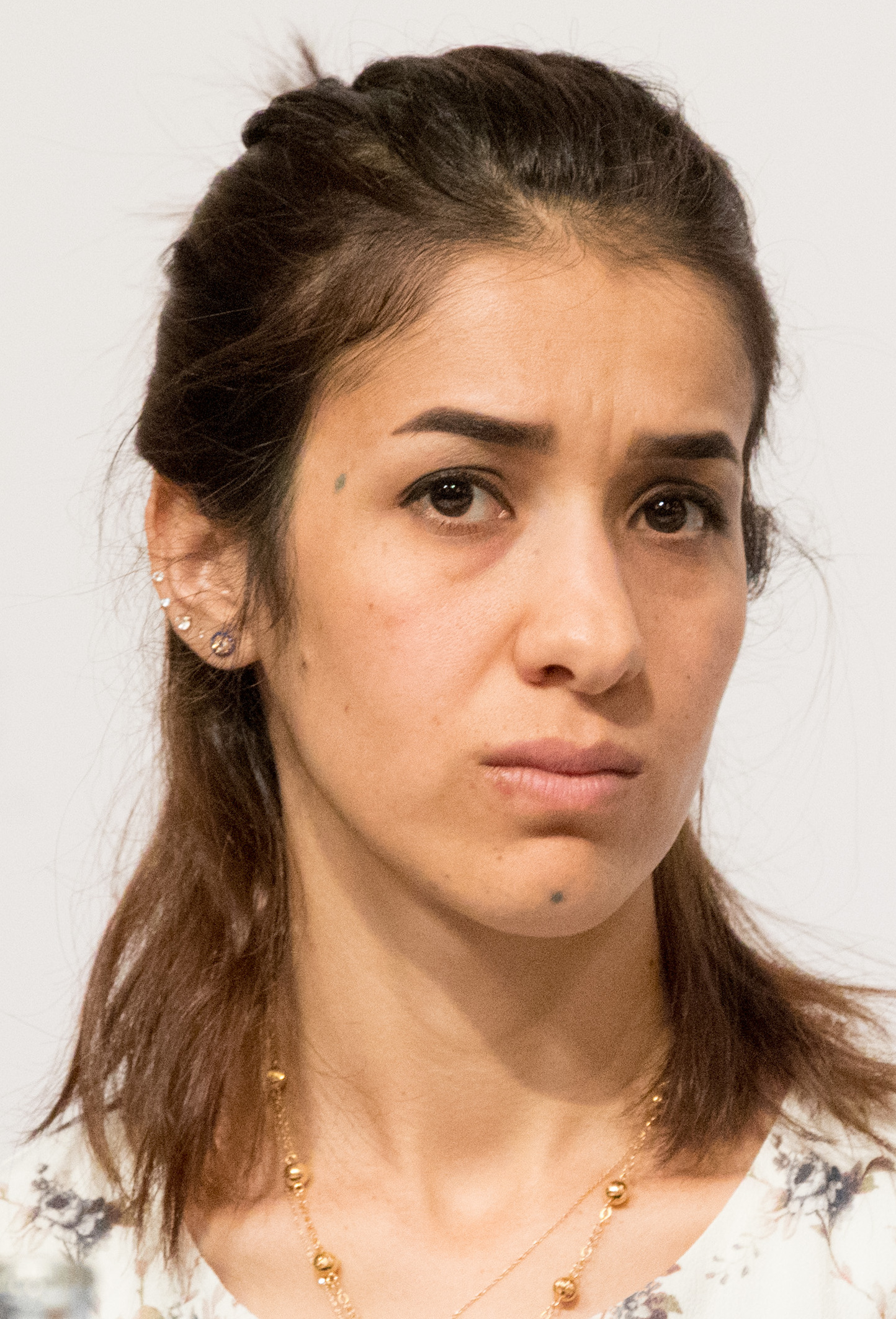
- Murad in 2018
- Born: Nadia Murad Basee Taha; 10 March 1993 (age 33); Kocho, Sinjar District, Iraq
- Years active: 2014–present
- Organization: Nadia's Initiative
- Known for: Surviving the Yazidi genocide
- Notable work: The Last Girl: My Story of Captivity, and My Fight Against the Islamic State (2017)
- Spouse: Abid Shamdeen (m. 2018)
- Awards: See list: Sakharov Prize (2016); Nobel Peace Prize (2018); Council of Europe Vaclav Havel Prize for Freedom of Thought (2016); Clinton Global Citizen Award (2016); Hillary Clinton Award for Advancing Women in Peace and Security (2018); United Nations Association of Spain Peace Prize (2017); International DVF Award (2019); Bambi Award (2019)
- Honours: National Order of the Legion of Honour (2026)

Nadia Murad Basee Taha (Kurdish: نادیە موراد بەسێ تەھا; Arabic: نادية مراد باسي طه; born 10 March 1993) is an Iraqi-born Yazidi human rights activist based in Germany. In 2014, during the Yazidi genocide by the Islamic State, she was abducted from her hometown of Kocho in Iraq. Much of her community was massacred. After losing most of her family, Murad was held as an Islamic State sex slave for three months, alongside thousands of other Yazidi women and girls.

Murad is the founder of Nadia's Initiative, a non-profit organization dedicated to "helping women and children victimized by genocide, mass atrocities, and human trafficking to heal and rebuild their lives and communities". Its establishment was prompted by the Sinjar massacre.

In 2018, she and Congolese gynecologist Denis Mukwege were jointly awarded the Nobel Peace Prize for "their efforts to end the use of sexual violence as a weapon of war and armed conflict." She is the first Iraqi and Yazidi to have been awarded a Nobel Peace Prize.

In 2016, Murad was appointed as the first-ever Goodwill Ambassador for the Dignity of Survivors of Human Trafficking for the United Nations Office on Drugs and Crime.

== Early and personal life ==
Murad was born in the village of Kocho in the Sinjar District, Iraq, populated mostly by Yazidi people. Her family, of the Yazidi minority, were farmers.

Murad is the youngest of 11 children, not including her four older half siblings. Murad's father married her mother after the death of his first wife, with whom he had four children. Both of her parents were devout Yazidis, though Murad did not know much about the religion growing up. Murad's father died in 2003.

As a child, Murad dreamed of owning a beauty salon. She was attached to her home and never imagined leaving Kocho to live elsewhere.

On 19 August 2018, Murad married fellow Yazidi human rights activist Abid Shamdeen in Germany.

== Yazidi genocide ==
=== Abduction by the Islamic State ===
At the age of 19, Murad was a student living in the village of Kocho in Sinjar, northern Iraq. On 15 August 2014, Islamic State fighters launched a surprise attack and rounded up the Yazidi community in the village, killing 600 people – including her mother and six of Nadia's brothers and stepbrothers – and taking the younger women and girls into slavery. That year, Murad was one of more than 6,700 Yazidi women and girls taken prisoner by Islamic State in Iraq. She was captured on 15 August 2014. She was held as a slave in the city of Mosul, where she was beaten, burned with cigarettes, and raped repeatedly. She successfully escaped after her captor left the house unlocked. Murad was taken in by a neighboring family, who were able to smuggle her out of the Islamic State-controlled area, allowing her to make her way to a refugee camp in Duhok, Kurdistan Region. She was out of ISIS territory in early September or in November 2014.

In February 2015, she gave her first testimony – under the alias of "Basima" – to reporters of the Belgian daily newspaper La Libre Belgique while she was staying in the Rwanga camp, living in a converted shipping container. In 2015, she was one of 1,000 women and children to benefit from a refugee programme of the Government of Baden-Württemberg, Germany, which became her new home.

=== Aftermath ===
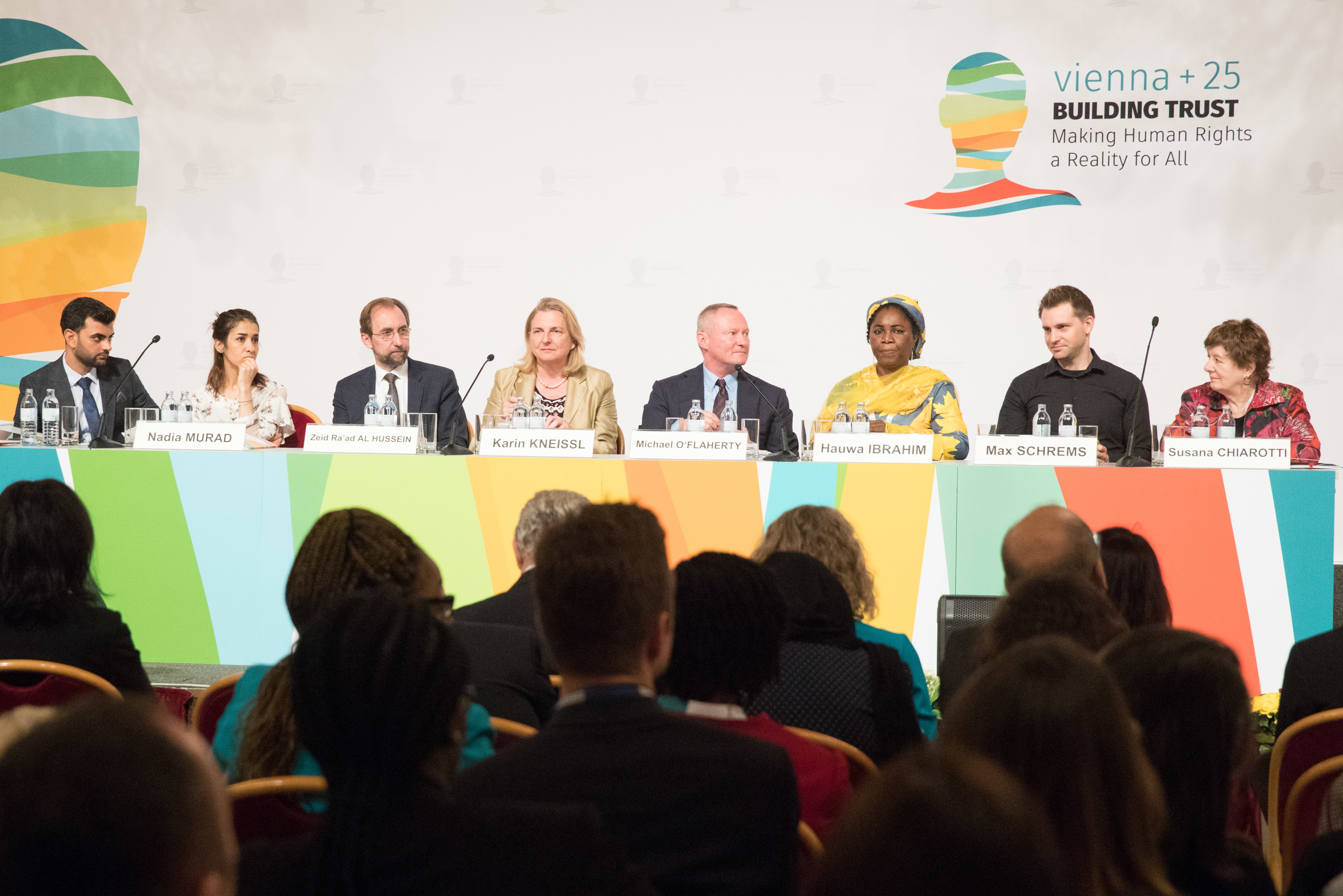
Human Rights panel in Vienna in 2018: left to right: 1 Abid Shamdeen 2 Nadia Murad 3 Zeid Ra'ad Al Hussein 4 Karin Kneissl 5 Michael O'Flaherty 6 Hauwa Ibrahim 7 Max Schrems 8 Susana Chiarotti

On 16 December 2015, Murad spoke to the United Nations Security Council about human trafficking and conflict. This was the first time the council was ever briefed on human trafficking. In 2016, Murad was named the first UNODC Goodwill Ambassador for the Dignity of Survivors of Human Trafficking. As part of her role as an ambassador, Murad participates in global and local advocacy initiatives to bring awareness of human trafficking and refugees. Murad has reached out to refugee and survivor communities, listening to testimonies of victims of trafficking and genocide.

In September 2016, Attorney Amal Clooney spoke before the United Nations Office on Drugs and Crime (UNODC) to discuss the decision that she had made in June 2016 to represent Murad as a client in legal action against ISIL commanders. Clooney characterized the genocide, rape, and trafficking by ISIL as a "bureaucracy of evil on an industrial scale", describing it as a slave market existing online, on Facebook and in the Mideast that is still active today. Murad has received serious threats to her safety as a result of her work.

== Activism ==
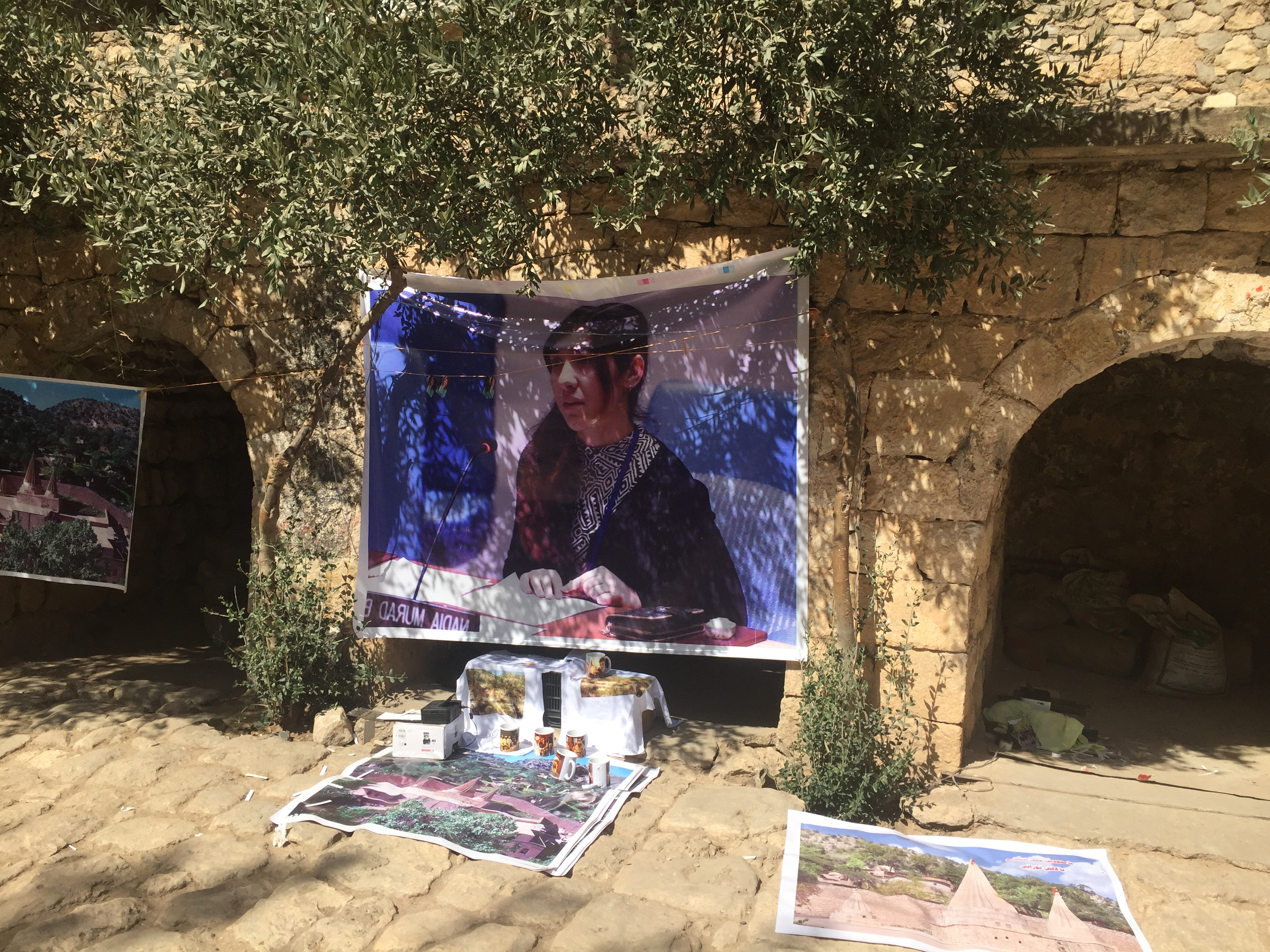
Poster of Nadia Murad speaking to the UN Security Council at the Yazidi Temple of Lalish, Ninawa

In September 2016, Murad announced Nadia's Initiative at an event hosted by Tina Brown in New York City. The Initiative intends to provide advocacy and assistance to victims of genocide.

On 3 May 2017, Murad met Pope Francis and Archbishop Paul Gallagher in Vatican City. During the meeting, she "asked for help for Yazidis who are still in ISIS captivity, acknowledged the Vatican support for minorities, discussed the scope for an autonomous region for minorities in Iraq, highlighted the current situation and challenges facing religious minorities in Iraq and Syria particularly the victims and internally displaced people as well as immigrants".

In 2018, Murad's activism focused on security and accountability. Along Nadia's Initiative, Murad worked with the Mines Advisory Group (MAG) to demine more than 2.6 million square meters of land in Sinjar, Iraq. She was also instrumental in drafting and passing UN Security Council Resolution 2379. The resolution called for the creation of an investigative team, headed by a special advisor, to support domestic efforts to hold ISIL (Da'esh) accountable by collecting, preserving, and storing evidence in Iraq of acts that may amount to war crimes, crimes against humanity, and genocide committed by the terrorist group ISIL (Da'esh).

Murad's activism focused on accountability and gender equality in 2019, as she aided in the prosecution of an ISIL militant's wife in Germany and the collection of evidence of ISIL crimes. Murad worked with the German Mission to the UN to help draft and pass UN Security Council Resolution 2467 in April 2019. The resolution expands the UN's commitments to end sexual violence in conflict and emphasizes a survivor-centric approach to justice and accountability. Murad also took part in advocating for G7 member states to adopt legislation that protects and promotes women's rights as a member of France's Gender Advisory Council.

Murad urged the government of the Iraqi Kurdistan region to play its role in rebuilding Yazidi areas in Sinjar District and returning the refugees back home. Nechirvan Barzani announced his full support "to the humanitarian role she plays in service of peace and the Yazidi victims," said the statement.

In 2019, Murad addressed the second annual Ministerial to Advance Religious Freedom where she spoke about her story and the ongoing challenges faced by Yazidis nearly five years after the 3 August 2014 attacks. She laid out a "five-point plan of action" to address the challenges Yazidis face in Iraq. Murad was included among a delegation of survivors of religious persecution from around the world whose stories were highlighted at the summit. As part of the delegation, on 17 July 2019, Murad met with U.S. President Donald Trump in the Oval Office with whom she shared her personal story of having lost her family members, including her mother and six brothers, and pleaded with him to do something.

In 2020, Murad began working with the Institute for International Criminal Investigations (IICI) and the Preventing Sexual Violence in Conflict Initiative (PSVI) of the United Kingdom government to establish the Murad Code. The Code is a global consultative initiative aimed at building and supporting a community of better practice for, with, and concerning survivors of conflict-related sexual violence. Its key objective is to respect and support survivors' rights, ensuring work with survivors to investigate, document, and record their experiences is safer, more ethical, and more effective in upholding their human rights.

On 6 February 2021, the Yazidi community buried 104 victims of the Kocho massacre, including two of Nadia's brothers and her mother. The ceremony was marked by both grief and closure, as many survivors were finally able to lay their family members to rest over six years after the genocide. It was also a visceral reminder of the urgent need to exhume all mass graves throughout Sinjar. In March 2021, the Iraqi Parliament passed the long-awaited Yazidi Female Survivors Law. The law formally acknowledges the Yazidi genocide and the gender-based trauma of sexual violence against Yazidi women and other ethnic minorities. It lays the groundwork for paying reparations, and guarantees land and job opportunities for survivors of ISIL captivity. Murad worked with Iraqi authorities and the Coalition for Just Reparations to draft and advocate for the law, as well as its ongoing implementation.

In May 2021, the United Nations Investigative Team to Promote Accountability for Crimes Committed by Da'esh/ISIL (UNITAD) presented landmark findings to the UN Security Council. UNITAD's Special Advisor, Karim Khan, reported to the Security Council that "there is clear and convincing evidence that the crimes against the Yazidi people clearly constituted genocide." Murad joined the proceedings to call on member states to establish international trials and support national efforts to prosecute ISIL members for their crimes of genocide and sexual violence.

In November 2021, a scheduled book club event in Canada with Nadia as a speaker was boycotted by the superintendent at the Toronto District School Board Helen Fisher, who declared the students from her school would not participate over fear of offending Islamic students and fostering Islamophobia. The move drew wide criticism, and the board was forced to clarify that these views were not their official position.

In 2022, Murad, along with Nadia's Initiative, the Institute for International Criminal Investigation, and the UK government, released the Murad Code. She spoke about its benefits at the United Nations Security Council open debate on "Accountability as Prevention: Ending Cycles of Sexual Violence in Conflict Open Debate on Conflict-Related Sexual Violence."

In January 2026, Murad condemned the international community's stance towards the Syrian transitional government's offensive against the Democratic Autonomous Administration of North and East Syria.

=== Global Survivors Fund ===
With her fellow 2018 Nobel Peace Prize Laureate, Dr. Denis Mukwege, Murad founded the Global Survivors Fund in October 2019. The Fund works to ensure that survivors of conflict-related sexual violence globally have access to reparations and other forms of redress.

The Global Survivors Fund (GSF) builds on the advocacy efforts of the Office of the United Nations' Special Representative of the Secretary-General on Sexual Violence in Conflict (SRSG-SVC). The UN Secretary-General endorsed GSF in a statement in April 2019, and Security Council Resolution 2467 referenced GSF. The G7 also confirmed its support for GSF in its Declaration on Gender Equality and Women's Empowerment in August 2019.

== Published works ==
Murad's memoir, The Last Girl: My Story of Captivity, and My Fight Against the Islamic State, was published by Crown Publishing Group on 7 November 2017, an autobiography in which she describes being captured and enslaved by the Islamic State. The book has been released in 44 languages including French (Pour que je sois la dernière), German (Ich bin eure Stimme: Das Mädchen, das dem Islamischen Staat entkam und gegen Gewalt und Versklavung kämpft), Arabic (الفتاة الاخيرة: قصتي مع الأسر ومعركتي ضد تنظيم داعش), Italian (L'ultima ragazza), and Spanish (Yo seré la última: Historia de mi cautiverio y mi lucha contra el Estado Islámico).

== Awards and honours ==
=== Nobel Peace Prize (2018) ===
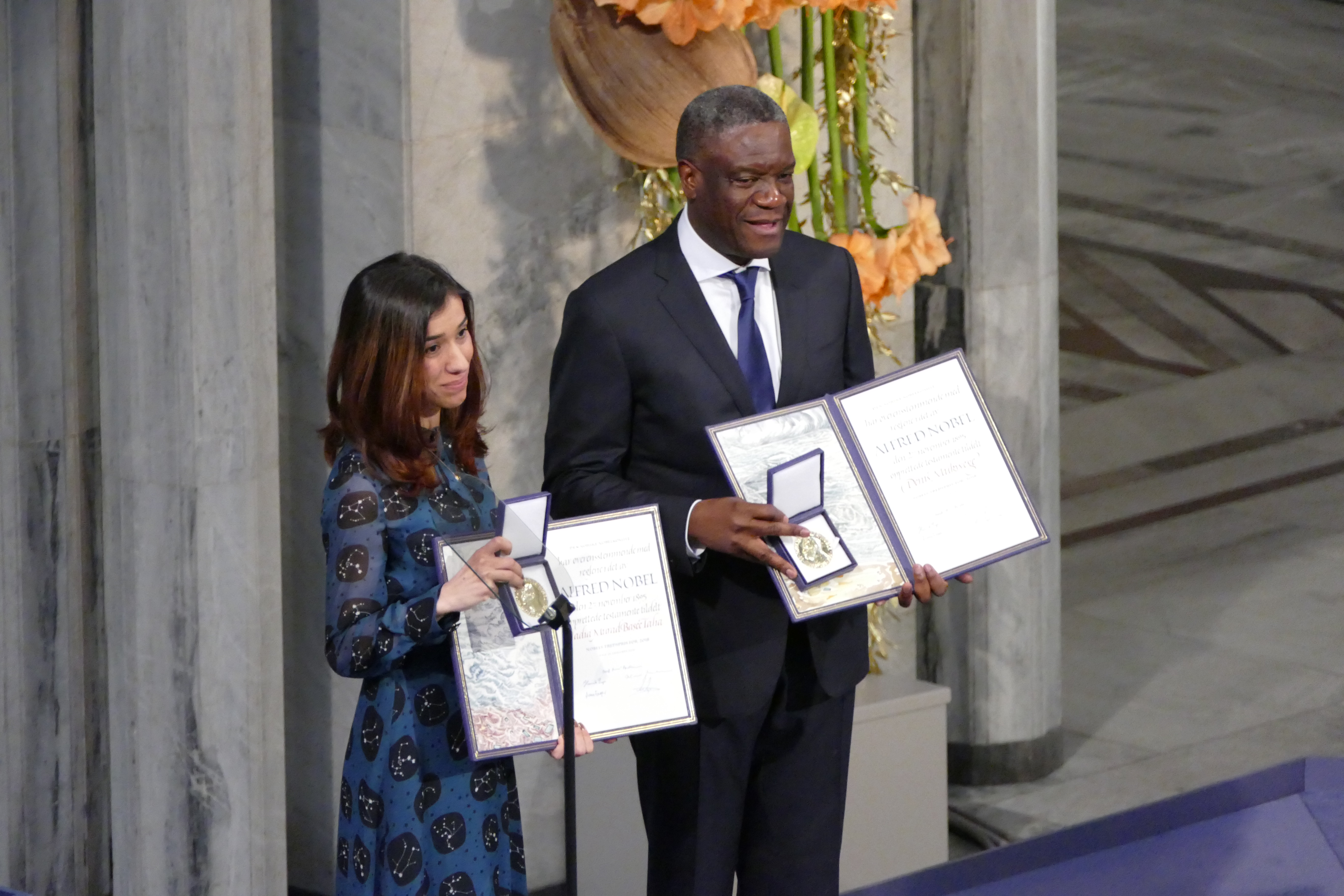
Murad and Denis Mukwege receive the Nobel Peace Prize in 2018

In 2018, Murad was co-winner (with Denis Mukwege, a Congolese gynaecologist) of the Nobel Peace Prize, awarded for the efforts of both people to end sexual violence as a weapon of war. The press release from the prize committee cited her refusal to remain 'silent and ashamed', and spoke of her courage in highlighting her own ordeal and that of other victims.

=== BBC 100 list ===
In December 2024, Nadia Murad was included on the BBC's 100 Women list.

=== Others ===
- 2016: First Goodwill Ambassador for the Dignity of Survivors of Human Trafficking of the United Nations
- 2016: Council of Europe Václav Havel Award for Human Rights
- 2016: Glamour Award for The Women Who Stood Up to ISIS
- 2016: Sakharov Prize for Freedom of Thought (with Lamiya Haji Bashar)
- 2016: Clinton Global Citizen Award
- 2016: United Nations Association of Spain Peace Prize
- 2016: TIME 100 Most Influential People
- 2016: Oxi Courage Award
- 2017: Forbes 30 Under 30
- 2018: Nobel Peace Prize (with Denis Mukwege)
- 2018: Hillary Clinton Award for Advancing Women in Peace and Security
- 2018: Global Goals Changemaker Award
- 2018: Elisabeth B. Weintz Humanitarian Award
- 2019: Bambi Award
- 2019: Golden Plate Award of the American Academy of Achievement
- 2019: International DVF Award
- 2019: Seton Hall University Honorary Doctorate
- 2019: Marisa Bellisario International Prize
- 2020: Vital Voices Global Trailblazer Award
- 2020: Justice O'Connor Prize
- 2020: Frank and Cheri Hermance Atlas Award
- 2021: UC Merced Spendlove Prize
- 2022: Chapman University Presidential Fellow
- 2026: National Order of the Legion of Honor

== Bibliography ==
- Nadia Murad: The Last Girl: My Story of Captivity, and My Fight Against the Islamic State (Virago eBook, 7 November 2017), ISBN 978-0-349-00974-2 (English)
- Nadia Murad: Ich bin eure Stimme: Das Mädchen, das dem Islamischen Staat entkam und gegen Gewalt und Versklavung kämpft (Knaur eBook, 31 October 2017), ISBN 978-3-426-21429-9 (German)
- I Choose My Beginning, S&S/Summit Books, 2026. ISBN 9781668097052

== Filmography ==
- On Her Shoulders (2018)

== See also ==
- List of Yezidi people
- Index of articles related to the Yezidis
- List of kidnappings (2010–2019)
- List of solved missing person cases (2010s)
