= Mir Hussein Beg Dasini =

Yezidi ruler and Ottoman governor (d. 1564)

Sanjakbey of Mosul
- Reign: 1534–1535

Sanjakbey of Erbil
- Reign: 1535–before 1544

Sanjakbey of Bitlis
- Reign: 1556–1558

Sanjakbey of Homs
- Reign: 1558–1559

Sanjakbey of Deir al-Rahba
- Reign: 14 March 1560 – 1564
- Died: 1564
- Issue: Said Beg; Dawud Beg; Ali Beg; Omer Beg; Yusif; Ahmed Beg
- Native name: Mîr Hisên Begê Dasinî
- House: Qatanî
- Dynasty: Sheikhan
- Father: Mir Hassan Beg
- Religion: Yazidism

Mir Hussein Beg Dasini (Kurmanji Kurdish: Mîr Hisên Begê Dasinî; Arabic: حسين بك الداسني; died 1564) was a 16th-century Yezidi ruler who governed in several provinces within the Ottoman Empire as sanjakbey.

He was appointed to Mosul in April–May 1534 and moved to Erbil in 1535, after Suleiman I ordered the killing of the Soran ruler Izz al-Din Shir and attached the Soran lands to the Erbil sanjak. Ottoman records place him later as the ruler of Bitlis (1556–1558), then in Homs, and from March 1560 in Deir al-Rahba, where he was still active in November 1564. The Sharafnama (1597) of Sharaf Khan Bidlisi says he was executed on the sultan's orders in 1534. The Ottoman records show this to be wrong. Several of his sons also held Ottoman administrative posts.

== Background ==
Prior to the 12th century, Yezidis in historical sources are identified as Dāsinī (Dasni). The name referred both to a religious community and to a territorial entity centered in the region of Dāsin, located northeast of Mosul and southwest of Amadiya in present-day northern Iraq. The term Dasināyā is also used for Yezidis in Syriac and Neo-Aramaic Christian sources. Around the end 13th century CE during the consolidation of the Yezidi community between the 12th and 14th centuries, the Yezidis living in the former principality of Dasin established or revived their political unit and gave it the new name "Sheikhan", named after Sheikh Adi.

Centered on Duhok, with the mountain overlooking the city known as "Mount Dasin", Yezidi rulers continued to carry the epithet “Dasinî” despite its new designation as Sheikhan until at least the mid-19th century, such as Mir Hussein Beg Dasinî and Mir Ali Beg Dasinî who are attested in historical sources. The Kurdish chronicler Sharaf Khan Bidlisi, writing in the 16th century, identified several Yezidi rulers using this title, including Mir Hussein Beg Dasini. He identified the Dasinî as one of the most prominent Yezidi tribes of the period.

=== Family ===
Hussein Beg belonged to the Qatani sheikh lineage, from which the Yezidi princes come. He was the son of Mir Hassan Beg and had several sons: Seîd Beg, Dawud Beg, Elî Beg, Omer Beg, Yusif, and Ehmed Beg. His sons were appointed to numerous sanjaks including Erbil, Tikrit, Karak, Shabak, Bitlis, Homs, Nablus, Keshaf, Eski Mosul and Rahba.

Seîd Beg was emir of the sanjaks of Karak and Shabak from 1556 to 1560. Dawud Beg is recorded as governor of Tikrit around 1556. In 1568 Seîd Beg and Dawud Beg received the tax farm (iltizam) of the Dasin region, which led to a dispute with Sultan Husayn, the emir of Amadiya. By 1573 Ottoman officials described Seîd Beg as a troublemaker. He had refused the sanjak of Qurna and asked for Tikrit instead.

== Career ==
=== Sanjakbey of Mosul ===
In April–May 1534, Hussein Beg Dasinî was appointed in charge of Mosul. His appointment to the sanjak was likely a result of his notable service to the state, although contemporary sources do not explicitly mention this. Hussein Beg was reportedly well-acquainted with governmental administration and the protocols for interacting with officials. According to the memoirs of Mamûn Beg, the emir of the Ardalan Emirate, his father, Bîke Beg, sought to establish relations with the Ottoman Empire but “was not familiar with the customs of slavery, nor with the customs of flattery and insult.” Consequently, he sent an envoy to Mir Hussein Beg Dasinî, who was regarded as knowledgeable and capable of providing guidance in such matters. His tenure in Mosul only lasted for some months months, as he was put in charge of Erbil from 1535.

=== Sanjakbey of Erbil ===
Mir Hussein Beg Dasini is primarily known from Sharafname by Sharafkhan Bitlisi, which provides the most detailed account of his life. Following the Ottoman conquest of Baghdad in 1534, Sultan Suleiman the Magnificent ordered the assassination of Izz ed-Din Sher, the ruler of Erbil and son of Shah Ali, annexed all the territories of Soran emirate to the Erbil Sanjak and appointed Mir Hussein Beg as the Mir of Erbil and its surroundings in the spring of 1535. Contemporary Ottoman sources suggest that the removal of Izz ed-Din Sher was motivated by his secret support for the Safavids, despite professed loyalty to the Ottoman state.

Soon after, Mir Hussein faced resistance from Muslim rulers of the region, including Mir Seyf ed-Din, son of Mîr Hussein of Soran, nephew of Izz ed-Din Sher and ruler of SImaqli, who did not tolerate Hussein Beg's rule. He attacked the Dasini several times and lost each time. He asked Bika Beg of Ardalan for help, but Bika Beg declined, fearing the sultan, and Sayf al-Din left Ardalan. Quli Beg, another nephew of Izz al-Din, also fought the Dasini and was beaten each time. He later took refuge with Shah Tahmasp I. Seyf ed-Din called for a "holy war" against Hussein Beg and the Yezidis and was able to assemble a large Muslim Kurdish force. The Yezidis under Hussein Beg initially managed to repel all attacks. However, when Hussein Beg was absent during a visit to, according to some sources, Sheikhan or Constantinople according to others, the Muslim Kurds under Sayfaddin seized the opportunity and attacked Erbil. Erbil fell into their hands and attempts to recapture it failed because the Muslim population sided with the new rulers. Hundreds of Yezidi fighters lost their lives in the process.

The Ottomans later sent Sultan Husayn, the ruler of Amadiya, against Soran, but did not recover it. Despite Hussein Beg’s efforts, conflicts between Mir Seyf ed-Din and the Ottomans continued for years. Ottoman records indicate that Husên Beg was replaced as Sanjakbeg of Erbil by Ferhad Beg before 1544.

=== Sanjakbey of Bitlis ===
After his service in Erbil, Mîr Hussein Beg Dasinî continued to hold various Ottoman administrative positions. Contrary to claims in Sharafname that he was executed in Istanbul, Ottoman documents indicate that he later served as emir of Bitlis, with records mentioning him in 1556–1558 as "Emir of the Sanjak of Bitlis, the Yezidi Hussein Beg Dasini", including a request for a timar for his son Ali, in response to which Sultan Suleiman ordered the governor of Van to follow up on the case and if he was found capable, he would be granted 10,000 akçe. This period coincided with the post-Treaty of Amasya (1555) era, when relations between the Ottoman and Safavid states were largely peaceful.

=== Sanjakbey of Homs and Deir al-Rahba ===
Mir Hussein Beg is later recorded in 1558-1559 as governing the Sanjak of Homs, where he oversaw local administration, suppressed uprisings by Arab and Turkmen tribes, and enforced religious regulations, including closing taverns and coffee houses. On 14 March 1560, he was transferred to the Sanjak of Dera al-Rahba (modern Deir ez-Zor). Although some sources suggest he died in 1564, Ottoman records show that as late as November 1564, he was still active, mediating a dispute between the Emir of Kilis, Janpolad Beg, and his son Habib Beg, the emir of Jableh Sanjak. He was also enlisted for military support to help the governor of Diyarbakir suppress a rebellion by nomadic Arab tribes of al-Baqqara and al-Maslihin. He appears to have died later that year, leaving behind several sons; Seîd Beg, Dawûd Beg, Elî Beg, Omer Beg, Yusif, and Ehmed Beg, some of whom held administrative positions in Ottoman sanjaks.

== See also ==
- List of Yazidi people
- Sheikhan principality
- Dasini (tribe)

== Sources ==
- "Hussein Beg Dasini und die Schlacht um Arbil". ÊzîdîPress (in German). 5 November 2015.
- Guli, Nizar (2025). "Mîrnişînên Dasin û Şêxan li Serdemê Osmanîyan (1515–1750): Vêkolîneke Dokûmenkarî" [The Emirates of Dasin and Sheikhan in the Ottoman Era, 1515–1750: A Documentary Study]. Peywend (in Kurdish).
- Guli, Nizar. "الأمير حسين بك الداسني وأبناؤه: دراسة في سيرتهم الذاتية ودورهم الإداري" [Prince Hussein al-Dasni and his sons: a study of their biography and administrative role] (in Arabic).
- Gülcü, Erdinç (2016). "XVI. Yüzyılın İkinci Yarısında Bağdat Vilayeti'nde Meydana Gelen İsyanlar ve Eşkıyalık Hareketleri". A.Ü. Türkiyat Araştırmaları Enstitüsü Dergisi (in Turkish). 57.
- Kerborani, Bahadin Hawar (2021). "Paying the Price of Dasht-i Karbala: Historical Perceptions of Yazidis in the Ottoman Era". In Tezcür, Güneş Murat (ed.). Kurds and Yezidis in the Middle East: Shifting Identities, Borders and the Experience of Minority Communities. Bloomsbury Academic. ISBN 978-0-7556-0119-6.
- "Herrschaftsbereich des Hisên Begê Dasinî (1534)". Jesiden.org (in German). Stelle für Jesidische Angelegenheiten. 6 April 2020.
