= Sheikhan principality =

Yazidi principality

Sheikhan Principality Êzîdxan (Kurdish)
- Capital: Duhok, Iraq (former capital); Baadre, Iraq (seat of the ruling family)
- Administrative center: Ain Sifni
- Common languages: Kurmanji
- Religion: Yazidism
- Demonyms: Welatî, Dasinî
- Government: Hereditary monarchy
- Mîr
  - fl. 1771: Mir Bedax Beg
  - ? - 1790: Mir Çolo Beg
  - 1790 – 1792: Mir Khanjar Beg
  - 1792 – 1809: Mir Hasan Beg
  - 1809 – 1833: Mir Ali Beg I
  - 1834 – 1841/43: Mir Jasim Beg
  - 1841/43 – 1879: Mir Hussein Beg
  - 1879 – 1899: Mir Mirza Beg
  - 1899 – 1913: Mir Ali Beg II
  - 1913 – 1944: Mir Said Beg
  - 1944 – 2019: Mir Tahsin Beg
  - 2019 – present: Mir Hazim Beg
- History
  - Established: c. 13th century
- Today part of: Iraq

The Sheikhan Principality, also known as Êzîdxan and historically as Dasin or Dasinî, is a Yazidi hereditary principality and religious polity, continuing to the present as an extraterritorial symbolic emirate. Historically centered in the Sheikhan–Lalish–Duhok region of northern Iraq, its ruling Mir serves as the highest political and religious authority of the global Yazidi community, exercising legislative and executive power, administering the Lalish sanctuary, and in charge of appointing the Baba Sheikh as head of the spiritual council. The principality emerged in the historical region of Dasin, a geographical and ethnonymic name attested in pre-Islamic and early Islamic sources referring to Kurdish-inhabited lands north of Mosul between the Tigris and Great Zab rivers.

Sheikhan principality functioned simultaneously as a political principality and as the central religious authority of the Yazidi community, with the Mir of Sheikhan presiding over Yazidi community both spiritually and politically, even as other Yazidi territorial units existed independently in geographically distant regions.

== Ruling dynasty ==
The rulers of the Sheikhan principality derive their authority from their genealogical connection to Sheikh Adi ibn Musafir, the principal saint of Yazidism, whom Yazidis regard as the earthly embodiment of God. The Mîr is regarded as the deputy of Sheikh Adi and the gates of the Lalish sanctuary bear the inscription identifying the Mir as "emir of Sheikhan and viceregent of Sheikh Adi". The princely family belongs to the Qatanî clan, one of three hereditary clans of the sheikh caste within the Yazidi religious hierarchy, whose members alone are eligible to hold the position of Mir.

The current ruling family assumed power approximately in the 13th or 14th century, during a period of conflict between the Adani and Shamsani sheikhs. The first Mîr of the Yazidis is considered to be Mîr Mihemedê Batinî from the house of Mîr Birahîm son of Derwêş Ademê Qatanî, who ruled in the early 14th century. He had two sons, Mir Melek and Mir Mensûr. The direct line of Mirs descends from Mîr Melek, while the descendants of Mir Mensur formed a collateral branch known as the Pismîrs, derived from the Kurmanji prefix pis meaning "son of", who retain a secondary claim to the position, exercisable only if the male line of the primary branch becomes extinct.

The precise date of origin of the institution of the Mir is unknown. However, the Yazidi sacred hymns known as qawls record a covenant attributed to Sheikh Fakhradin, the third-ranking saint in the Yazidi religious hierarchy, active in the 13th century, enjoining the creation of such an authority. The institution took its final definitive form in the 16th century, following several centuries during which its norms gradually developed and consolidated.

The authority of the Mir is theocratic in nature. In the religious hymns, the Mir is referred to as the equivalent of caliph for the Yazidis. While the Mir serves as the highest communal authority and presides over the Supreme Spiritual Council, religious authority in a strictly clerical sense resides with the Baba Sheikh. The relationship has been described as analogous to that of the British monarch as head of the Church of England and the Archbishop of Canterbury respectively.

During the Ottoman period, the sultan formally recognized the Yazidi prince's right to the seat of the emirate; following the establishment of the Iraqi state, the Mir has been recognized by the Iraqi government. His responsibilities include municipal administration, mediation of tribal disputes, and financial governance. The Mir also appoints the Extiyarê Mergehê (Baba Sheikh). The seat of the Yazidi Mir is located in the town of Baadre, in the Shekhan district of Iraq.

== Early history & background ==
Prior to the 12th century, Yazidis in historical sources are identified as Dāsinī (Dasni). The name referred both to a religious community and to a territorial entity centered in the region of Dāsin, located northeast of Mosul and southwest of Amadiya in present-day northern Iraq. Yazidis identified as Dasini are recorded as inhabiting this region continuously, and the designation remained in use for Yazidi princes until the mid-19th century. The term Dasināyā is also used for Yazidis in Syriac and Neo-Aramaic Christian sources.

Majid Hassan Ali identifies this period preceding the religious reforms associated with the saint Sheikh Adi ibn Musafir (d. 1162), as the phase during which Yazidi religious life was structured primarily around rituals, mythology, customs, and largely oral transmission. The consolidation of Yazidi political and religious authority occurred after the arrival of Sheikh Adi in the Lalish valley in the early 12th century. Following his death, his descendants and successors combined spiritual leadership with temporal authority, gradually transforming the former Dasin region into a new political unit known as Sheikhan. From the late 13th century onward, this polity is increasingly identifiable in historical sources.

Al-Baladhuri (d. 892 CE), mentions Dasin as among the Kurdish regions brought under control in 18 AH / 639 CE during early Islamic conquests. Medieval Muslim geographers such as Ibn Hawqal (10th century) and Yaqut al-Hamawi (13th century) also referred to Dasin. Ibn Hawqal located it near Mosul, by the banks of the Great Zab River, while the 13th-century Arab geographer Yāqūt al-Hamawī (1179-1229) mentioned the Dasini as residing in "Jabal Dasin," a mountainous area within their traditional homeland. Later, in the 14th century, the Arab historian Shihāb al-Dīn al-ʿUmarī (1301-1349) recorded the presence of Dasini communities in Akre (modern-day Aqrah), a historically significant town in present-day Iraqi Kurdistan.

During the 12th and early 13th centuries, Yazidi rulers exercised political authority over a wide territory. Under Sheikh Hasan, the grandnephew of Sheikh Adi, the Sheikhan principality reached the height of its power during the 1230s and 1240s, a period during which centralization of authority was carried out and the foundational institutions and rules of Yazidi society and religion were established, including the creation of a collective council of religious figures ("Council of Holy Men") analogous to a synod.

This period ended following the killing of Sheikh Hasan in 1246 by Badr al-Din Lulu, ruler of Mosul. In 1254, Luʾlu launched a military campaign against the Yazidis, during which Lalish was attacked, the remains of Sheikh Adi were exhumed and burned, and Yazidis captured at the sanctuary were executed. Yazidis regained control of Hakkari, Bahdinan and the Dāsin region under the reign of Sharfadin, however, this was a short-lived triumph as he was killed by Mongol forces in 1257.

Around the end 13th century CE during the consolidation of the Yazidi community between the 12th and 14th centuries and a period when several Kurdish emirates emerged following the decline of Abbasid empire, the Yazidis living in the former principality of Dasin established or revived their political unit and gave it the new name "Sheikhan", named after Sheikh Adi. Centered on Duhok, with the mountain overlooking the city known as "Mount Dasin", Yazidi rulers continued to carry the epithet “Dasinî” despite its new designation as Sheikhan until at least the mid-19th century, such as Mir Husayn Beg Dasinî and Mir Ali Beg Dasinî who are attested in historical sources. The Kurdish historian Sharaf Khan Bidlisi, writing in the 16th century, identified several Yazidi rulers using this title, including Mir Husayn Beg Dasni. He also identified the Dasinî as one of the most prominent Yazidi tribes of the period. The principality is also referred to as Êzîdxan, as it was characteristic for Yazidi rulers to refer to their territories with a certain level of independence as Ezdikhan (Êzdîxan) or Ezidkhan (Êzîdxan). This was also the name of the Yazidi principality in Abagha.

From the 14th century onward, Yazidis developed their own religious and political institutions in the regions where they lived. The Yezidi territory was divided into seven administrative centres, each having its own Sincaq (banner, flag, province, region), more commonly known as Tawis among the Yezidis. Sincaqs are sacred bronze effigies bearing the image of a bird or peacock to symbolize Tawûsî Melek. They serve as symbols of power for each administrative centre, namely:

1. Tawisa Enzel: Welatşêx (Şêxan) - Lalish
2. Tawisa Şingalê: Shingal District
3. Tawisa Hekkarê: sometimes also called Tawisa Zozana: Historical region of Hakkari (Hakkari, Şırnak, Van and Duhok).
4. Tawisa Welatê Xalta: Region around Siirt, Batman, Diyarbakir, Mardin, etc.
5. Tawisa Helebê: Aleppo and Afrin.
6. Tawisa Tewrêzê: the city of Tabriz, located in today's Iran (Yazidis lived in the western hinterland in the Khoy region).
7. Tawisa Misqofa (Moscow): Renamed from Tawisa Serhedê after the exodus of the Yazidis from Serhed to the Russian Empire. Serhed is a region covering the cities of Kars, Ardahan, Erzurum, Ağri, Van, Bitlis and Muş.

Every six months, the Yezidi Qewals, who are trained reciters of Qewls and other forms of sacred oral Yezidi tradition, were sent out to other Yezidi-inhabited areas with military protection from the central administrative region of Shekhan and the spiritual centre of Lalish. This tradition served to preserve the Yazidi faith and doctrine. The Qewals, supported by voluntary alms, led a Sincaq through Yazidi villages to maintain spiritual legitimacy and symbolize the authority of Lalish and the Mîr.

Sheikhan developed into the main religious center of Yazidism, and its ruler held a position of both political and spiritual leadership. The Mir of Sheikhan was regarded as the religious and political head of the Yazidis. As custodian of Lalish and deputy of Sheikh Adi in Yazidi belief, the Mir presided over the Yazidi religious hierarchy and headed the supreme spiritual council. While other Yazidi principalities and territorial units existed, those located at a distance from Sheikhan operated independently in practice, despite acknowledging Sheikhan’s central religious authority.

From the 15th century onward, the Yazidis of Sheikhan and surrounding regions were repeatedly subjected to military campaigns and religious edicts. In 1414, following a fatwa issued by Jalal al-Din Muhammad ibn ʿIzz al-Din al-Hulwani, several Kurdish rulers, including the emir of Botan, launched a coordinated attack on the Yazidis of Mount Dāsin. Further fatwas issued in the 16th and 18th centuries by Sunni jurists declared the Yazidis heretics, permitting their killing and enslavement. Such campaigns were carried out at various times by Kurdish emirs, Ottoman authorities, and Safavid forces.

In 1446, Mir Jahanshah attacked the city of Duhok and its southern regions extending to the city of Mosul, which included the Dasin region, and plundered them. According to History of the Eastern Syriac Church, in 1464 the Aq Qoyunlu prince Uzun Hasan departed from that area accompanied by his servant Khalil al-Awer (possibly referring to his general Khalil Beg Musullu) in order to kill the inhabitants of the region by the sword. The Yazidis, according to the source, became victims of this campaign. Many were killed, and numerous villages were destroyed.

Despite these events, the fifteenth century is described as a golden age for the Yazidi religion. According to Sharafkhan Bidlisi, Yazidism was the official religion of several Kurdish emirates, including Botan, Mahmudi, Sulaymani, Kilis/Azaz, and the Dunbuli.

In 1501 CE, the Safavid Empire was founded and began expanding into the regions of Kurdistan. In 1508, it took control of Diyarbakir and Mosul, bringing the Dasini settlements under Safavid authority. Mir of Bahdinan Hasan ibn Seyf al-Din, who is described as a son of Shah Ismail, was received favorably by the Shah, who entrusted him with assisting in the capture of the fortress of Duhok from the Dasini tribe and strengthening his hereditary position. From this account, it may be inferred that Duhok functioned as the center of the Dasini principality, and that after 1508 it came under the control of the Bahdinan emirate. Dasin was liberated from Safavid control by the end of 1515.

== Ottoman period (1515-1918) ==
=== Integration into the Ottoman Empire (Early 16th century) ===
After consolidating control over the region, the Ottoman state established its first administrative structure in Kurdistan in 1518 with the creation of the Vilayet of Diyarbakir. All territories under Ottoman control in the region were attached to this province. Information concerning the role of the Dasinis in the political events of the early Ottoman period is limited. The earliest reference to their activities dates to 926 AH / 1520 CE. In that year, the governor of Diyarbakir, Muhammad Pasha, sent a report to the sultan describing a conflict between several Kurdish princes and the Safavid commander Çayan Sultan.

The governor reported that the Soran prince Seyid Beg had requested Ottoman assistance in repelling a Safavid attack on his emirate. Mir Seyid Ahmed Bukhti, Bekir Beg, and the Sheikhan princes affiliated with Mosul joined the campaign. These forces met with the Soran princes, while the forces of Çayan Sultan were stationed in the village of Naznin. The combined forces defeated the Safavid troops and pursued them as far as the Lower Zab River near the town of Altun Köprü.

One of the most significant developments concerning the Dasinis during the Ottoman period was the appointment of Mir Hussein Beg as sanjakbeg of Mosul in 1534. Subsequently, his sons were appointed as governors of Ottoman sanjaks in various regions, including Erbil, Tikrit, Karak, Shebak, Bitlis, Homs, Nablus, Keshaf, Eski Mosul, Dera al-Rahba, and other districts. The Dasinis also participated in the removal of the Soran prince Izzeddin Sher, who was aligned with the Safavid authorities. In return, Mir Husayn received the sanjakbeylik of Erbil and authority over territories formerly belonging to the Soran emirate.

They further took part in major military campaigns against the Safavid state. An Ottoman document records that a Dasini prince, Mir Izzeddin, son of Abdi Beg, participated in the attack on Shahrazur. This campaign was conducted by the Ottoman commander Osman Pasha the Circassian as part of the broader Ottoman offensive led by Sultan Suleiman I in 1554.

=== Conflicts in late 16th century ===
Relations between the Dasinis and the Ottoman authorities began to deteriorate during the second half of the sixteenth century. Ottoman administrative documents frequently describe the Dasinis as groups engaged in rebellion, raiding, and blocking roads, though they do not explain the circumstances that led to these conflicts. The first clear signs of deteriorating relations between the Dasinis and the Ottoman authorities appear in 1560. On 15 November of that year, Sultan Suleiman I sent an order to the emir of Bahdinan, Sultan Husayn Beg, naming three Dasinis accused of blocking roads. Among them was Budaq Beg Kela, who had rebuilt and fortified a stronghold and barricaded himself there with a group of followers, blocking the road between Mosul and Erbil. The leader of the Sheikhan group, Sheikh Izzeddin, was also mentioned in connection with similar activities. Another figure, Mir Qasim, who lived in the sanjak of Açuz and belonged to the same taifa, was likewise accused of obstructing the roads. The sultan ordered their arrest “with caution” and warned Sultan Husayn Beg not to neglect the matter.

Earlier correspondence had already addressed the activities of Qasim Dasini. On 28 September 1560, the sultan wrote to the governor of Diyarbakir reporting that several areas belonging to the sanjak of Eski Mosul, then part of the province of Baghdad, had been abandoned because travelers no longer dared to pass through them due to widespread road blockades. The territory was under the control of a zaʿamet holder named Qasim Dasini, who had subsequently been removed from office. The sultan questioned whether the emir of the sanjak had failed in his responsibility to maintain security and asked why the area had not been restored. These references indicate that Qasim Dasini had previously administered the land as a zaʿamet holder.

In 1568, the brothers Said Beg and Dawud Beg, sons of Mir Husayn Dasini, received the iltizam of the Dasin region. This decision caused tension with the emir of Bahdinan, Sultan Husayn, who regarded parts of the Dasin territory as belonging to his own domain. In a letter to the governor of Baghdad dated 29 August 1568, the sultan reported that Sultan Husayn accused the Yazidi tribes of theft, corruption, and blocking roads along the routes between Mosul, Erbil, Amadiya, and Diyarbakir. He also claimed that Said Beg and Dawud Beg had plundered villages and seized agricultural produce from the village of Karamlis while collecting revenues. The reference to Karamlis was significant because the village belonged to the sultan’s khas lands, making any violation a direct offense against the state. The sultan therefore ordered that the Yazidis be removed from Karamlis and relocated elsewhere and that Said Beg repay the revenues owed to the emir. He further instructed that the matter be investigated according to the law and that Said Beg be dismissed if the accusations were confirmed.

Due to numerous complaints about the Dasinis, the Ottoman sultan ordered the neighboring sanjaks to prepare a joint campaign against the Dasin territories. In a letter to the emir of the sanjak of Mosul, he stated that the groups identified as “Şêxan and Dasin” lived in the areas between Mosul, Arsiyab, Amadiya, and Botan. Reports submitted by the alaybeg of Mosul and other military and administrative officials accused these groups of long-standing involvement in corruption, theft, robbery, and banditry, as well as blocking roads. The sultan proposed that their territories be distributed among neighboring regional princes in order to bring the area under control and requested opinions on the feasibility of this plan.

A letter dated 8 March 1571 describes measures taken by the emir of Bahdinan, Sultan Husayn Beg, who met with the sanjakbeg of Mosul, Sinan Beg, on the orders of the governor of Diyarbakir to investigate the situation in Dasin. Their inquiry identified the village of Bahzani as a principal center of the Dasinis and named several leaders associated with them, including Sheikh İzzeddin, his son Barakat, and Sheikh Piri. Preparations were made for a coordinated military attack involving several sanjaks, but after news of the planned campaign spread, Sheikh Izzeddin and his followers fled to an unknown location. During the subsequent fighting, Pir Qasim, the father of Sofi Beg, was killed, and other individuals mentioned in the report included Gulabi, Piri Beg, Zeynel, and Sheikh Heydar.

On 18 June 1571, the sultan wrote again to Sultan Husayn Beg stating that the leaders of the Dasinis and the Sheikhan groups had escaped and dispersed into neighboring territories, including the sanjaks of Botan, Mosul, Amadiya, and Erbil. Orders were also sent to the emirs of Hakkari, Cizre Botan, Mosul, and Erbil instructing them to search for the fugitives and arrest those proven to have participated in rebellion. At the same time, the sultan instructed provincial authorities to punish only those directly responsible for crimes and warned them not to act on accusations made by "extremists or fanatics", emphasizing that investigations should be conducted carefully and in accordance with the law.

Mir Sultan Husayn of Bahdinan and his allied forces eventually succeeded in bringing the Dasin region under control and removing the authority of the Dasin chiefs there. On 8 September 1572, the Ottoman sultan informed the governor of Baghdad that Sultan Husayn Beg had captured the town of Bahzani, described as the center of the rebellion led by Sheikh İzzeddin and his son Barakat, as well as the nearby village of Bashiqa. The sultan’s letter stated that the rebellion and acts of corruption in the area had been suppressed, although the leaders and some of their close followers had escaped to unknown locations.

This rivalry between Dasini princes and the princes of Bahdinan began before Ottoman rule in the region. In 1509, the Bahdinan princes seized several territories from the Dasinis, including the city of Duhok. During the same period, the Bahdinan rulers also captured the city of Zakho from the Sindi princes. Zakho subsequently experienced repeated uprisings against Bahdinan authority throughout the second half of the sixteenth century. Similar unrest and sustained opposition to Bahdinan rule also occurred in Dasini territories that had come under Bahdinan control. These uprisings were widespread across the Dasini regions and continued through the later sixteenth century.

At the same time that the authorities attempted to locate the Dasini and Sheikhan leaders and divide their territories among neighboring sanjaks, efforts were also made, with encouragement by certain religious figures, to suppress the Yazidi religion. In a letter dated 23 September 1572, the sultan reported that the emir of Bahdinan, Sultan Husayn Beg, the former governor of Shahrazur Ahmed Beg, and the qadi of Diyarbakir, Mevlana Husayn, had informed him that the Dasini leaders had been overthrown and that some of their followers had been killed while others had fled to neighboring sanjaks and taken refuge with the princes of Mosul, Botan, and Erbil. One of the reports described measures taken against the Yazidi sanctuary of Lalish, stating that earlier religious rulings had declared the sect infidel and had ordered the shrine to be demolished. Despite these measures, the reports also noted that Yazidi followers continued to visit the site and perform their rituals, including pilgrims arriving from Damascus, Aleppo, and other regions such as Botan, Mosul, Hazo, and Erbil. In his response, the sultan ordered that the followers of the group be investigated by local judges and punished according to the law if acts of rebellion or disorder were proven.

After the suppression of the uprising in Dasin, officials in other regions attempted to act against Yazidi communities in their own territories. On 23 October 1572, the sultan wrote to the governor of Shahrazur following complaints from the qadi of Shahrazur that communities along both sides of the Lower Zab River between Mosul and Erbil had followed the Yazidi faith and were accused of blocking roads and robbing travelers. The qadi cited the arrest of several Dasinis in Erbil as evidence of these claims. The sultan ordered the provincial authorities to investigate the matter and to punish those responsible if the accusations were confirmed. Despite official claims that the rebellion had been suppressed, later documents show that the leaders had not been captured and that resistance continued. Reports from 1573 state that Sheikh Izzeddin and his son Barakat remained active, with the qadi of Mosul accusing them of attacking travelers, plundering villages, and interfering in the affairs of local officials. In response, the sultan issued further orders to the princes of Amadiya and Botan to pursue the rebel leaders and restore order in the region.

Mir Said Beg, son of Hussein Beg Dasini, had previously served as emir of the Karak and Shabak sanjak from 1556 to 1560. After being relieved of this post, he returned to his homeland and, by 1568, is recorded as the iltizam holder in the sanjak of Mosul. By 1573, his relations with the Ottoman authorities had deteriorated, and he was described in official reports as a “traitor and troublemaker.” Although he had been granted the sanjak of Qurna north of Basra, he refused to assume this post and instead encouraged the Sheikhan tribe to attack villages within the Mosul sanjak. Sheikh Izzeddin and his followers also conducted raids into the territories of the Bahdinan emirate. Reports sent to the governor of Baghdad indicate that, after orders were issued to eliminate Sheikh Izzeddin, he fled to Eski Mosul and took refuge with local leaders while his followers continued to attack and harass Ottoman-aligned forces in the region.

To curb the growing unrest, the Ottoman authorities attempted to negotiate with Mir Said Beg by offering him the sanjaks of Qurna and Kharraf. He rejected these assignments, suspecting they were designed to distance him from his followers and weaken his influence. Instead, he requested the sanjak of Tikrit and the attachment of the Dasin tribe to that sanjak. The sultan, informed by Mir Sultan Husayn Beg, described Mir Said and Sheikh İzzeddin as leading Dasini groups who had become thieves and robbers, spreading disorder across Mosul, Erbil, and Nusaybin. The sultan also noted that some Dasinis held positions within state institutions, which had further strengthened their power. To counter this, he ordered the termination of all iqtaʿ rights previously granted to the Dasinis and instructed the governors of Baghdad and Shahrazur to prevent future feudal appointments to them.

Despite these measures, complaints about Dasini rebellions persisted. On 7 August 1575, the sultan instructed the emir of Erbil to suppress disobedience among the Dasini tribe along the Sari Su River. The unrest escalated in 1577 when members of the Dasini tribe killed Dilawar Beg, the emir of the Bajwanlo sanjak. A letter from the emir of Mosul and his qadi reported that the perpetrators, residents of the village of Zatra, had been followers of the Yazidi faith and were led by Ali Khan and Isa. Individuals named Wêran and Zeynel were identified as leaders of these groups. Additional orders were issued on 3 September and 2 October 1578 instructing the emir of Amadiya, Qubad Beg, to arrest Dasini groups and other bandits operating in the region and to restore security, particularly in response to complaints from the inhabitants of Mosul regarding road blockades and damage to state lands. Copies of these orders were also sent to the emirs of Soran and Botan to ensure coordinated action.

On 18 July 1577, the sultan sent a letter to the governor and qadi of Baghdad reporting complaints from the emir of Amadiya, Qubad Beg, who identified the Sheikhan group and Dasinis as the main source of unrest in his province. He described an incident in which eight scholars and several camels carrying goods were traveling toward Mosul and were attacked near Bashiqa by a group that included individuals named Abdal and Imad al-Din. The victims were killed and their property seized. While ordering that the perpetrators be punished, the sultan also instructed the authorities not to rely on false testimony or unfounded accusations. Comparable reports of unrest were not noted in other provinces such as Damascus, Aleppo, Diyarbakir, or Van, where Yazidi communities were also present.

The documents indicate that one of the immediate causes of the uprisings was a dispute over taxation. Mir Suleiman Beg, son of Mir Dawud Beg, had been responsible for collecting taxes from the Dasini communities in the sanjaks of Erbil, Mosul, and Açuz for a sum of 50,000 akçes. This arrangement was later revoked by the authorities of the Baghdad province, and the responsibility for collecting Dasini taxes was transferred to the sanjakbeg of Mosul, Sinan Beg, and the sanjakbeg of Eski Mosul, Zeynelabiddin Beg, for double the previous amount. Mir Suleiman opposed this decision and encouraged Dasini tribal leaders to rebel and carry out uprisings in the affected regions. In response, the Ottoman authorities ordered the termination of administrative and financial agreements with Dasini leaders.

In early 1579, the sultan issued an order to the sanjakbeg and qadi of Mosul stating that the Dasini tribe was to be denied all forms of support and provisions. Reports submitted at the time described groups of Dasinis gathering in armed bands of 50–60 men, blocking major routes between Baghdad, Shahrazur, Diyarbakir, and Aleppo, and robbing travelers. Their activities were also said to have disrupted tax collection and mint operations in the Mosul sanjak.

Additional reports from the emir of Amadiya described continued unrest in the regions between Mosul, Eski Mosul, and Erbil. These reports identified several figures, including a leader named Mirza, who was accused of blocking roads and carrying out attacks. Incidents included raids on villages such as Qaraqosh, the killing of local leaders, and attacks on caravans. The sanjakbeg of Erbil, Muhammad Beg, was reportedly captured during one such attack, and several of his men were killed. These reports portray a situation of sustained instability affecting both rural settlements and major transit routes.

In a letter dated 25 October 1579, the sultan provided a broader description of the extent of Dasini activity. He stated that the Dasini and Sheikhan groups, numbering more than 2,000 families, were dispersed across several sanjaks, including Mosul, Erbil, Eski Mosul, Amadiya, Shingal, Bajwan, and areas along the Great Zab River, as well as villages such as Alqosh and those connected to Baghdad and Shahrazur. He reported that earlier attempts by local emirs to suppress them had failed, as they dispersed into neighboring territories and continued operating in armed groups of varying size. The sultan ordered the governor of Baghdad to carry out a coordinated campaign against them, but noted that the groups had again dispersed before the operation began. Instructions were therefore sent to neighboring rulers, including the prince of Soran and the emir of Bahdinan, to pursue and arrest those who had taken refuge in their territories.

On 9 December 1579, the sultan sent a letter to the governor of Baghdad reiterating complaints about the activities of the Dasinis, describing them as engaged in rebellion and disorder. The report stated that they were attacking the residences of local officials and the villages attached to timar holders, while refusing to comply with judicial summons issued by sanjakbegs and qazis. The sultan identified Seyfeddin, son of Seyid Beg, as a leading figure among them and ordered his arrest along with his followers. Similar concerns were raised in a petition sent on 18 February 1580 by notables of Mosul, who complained about Seyfeddin, his brothers, and their associates. In response, the sultan instructed the governor of Baghdad to investigate the accusations, record the names of those involved, and impose punishment if the charges were confirmed, while emphasizing that no action should be taken against individuals not directly implicated.

Complaints also came from provincial officials. On 4 July 1581, the sanjakbeg of Mosul reported that the area of Topraq Qala, located between Mosul, Eski Mosul, and the road to Baghdad, had become a center of unrest. Responsibility for securing this area had been entrusted to a Dasini leader named Sinjan, who was accused of supporting rebellious groups instead of suppressing them. The sultan ordered the governors of Baghdad and Diyarbakir to arrest him with caution and to detain any offenders, particularly if they were members of the sipahi class, while again warning against reliance on false accusations. Further reports, including one dated 21 July 1582, indicated that Dasini and Sheikhan groups continued to operate between Nusaybin and Kirkuk, and that the combined forces of the Mosul and Erbil sanjaks had been unable to fully suppress them.

Reports of unrest persisted into 1583, including an incident in which members of the Dasini group attacked and robbed the entourage of Teymur Khan of Ardalan while they were traveling to Istanbul to declare allegiance to the Ottoman state. In response, the sultan issued orders to regional authorities, including the emir of Keshaf, to investigate the incident and take action against those responsible. In another reported incident, a group of Dasini men attacked a caravan returning to the emir of the Zengabad sanjak, Ali Beg, killing several of his men and seizing their property. The sultan referred to this incident in a letter to the emir of Amadiya, Qubad Beg, stating that Dasini groups had divided into smaller bands, blocking roads and looting the property of regional rulers. The same report indicates that a Dasini leader, Sheikh Barakat, was appointed as sanjakbeg of Eski Mosul. Together with his cousin Zeynal and approximately 160 armed men, he entered the city of Mosul and forced merchants to close their shops for ten days, although no clear reason for this action was given.

Sheikh Barakat had previously been identified in Ottoman correspondence as a leading figure among the Dasini rebels and had been the subject of repeated efforts to capture or eliminate him. Despite earlier orders issued to regional authorities, including the emirs of Amadiya and Mosul and the governors of Baghdad and Shahrazur, he remained active. Subsequent reports indicate that a form of accommodation was reached, reflected in his appointment to Eski Mosul. Nevertheless, unrest continued, and reports of road blockades and disruptions, particularly along routes between Baghdad and Shahrazur, persisted until at least March 1585.

In 1591, the Ottoman authorities issued some of the most severe orders against the Dasinis during the 16th century. These measures followed a series of attacks attributed to Dasini groups, including the killing of Wali Beg, son of the emir of the Hamrin region, Farhad Beg, who was ambushed and killed along with several companions. On 30 July 1591, Sultan Murad III sent orders to the governors of Shahrazur and Mosul and to several Kurdish emirs, including those of Bahdinan, Soran, and Qaradakh, calling for a coordinated campaign against the Dasinis. It is unclear whether the large-scale campaign was fully carried out, as available sources do not confirm its implementation. What is evident, however, is that the Ottoman state did not succeed in eliminating the Dasinis.

In March 1592, new orders were issued to the governors of Diyarbakir and Mosul and to the qazis of Amed and Mosul concerning the Dasin and another tribe that had refused to pay taxes. These orders again referred to continued plundering, road blockades, and unrest. The same records also note the presence of Dasini men within Ottoman military forces, indicating that members of the group were integrated into the state structure while remaining a distinct force in the region.

=== 17th century ===
At the end of the 16th century and the beginning of the 17th century, the region appears to have experienced a period of relative stability. In 1598, the Ottoman historian Abdulkadir Effendi recorded the submission of several regional rulers, including the leaders of Dasin, the emir of Amed, and the prince of Soran, under the authority of the grand vizier Ibrahim Pasha. In 1609, he again described the sanjaks of the Mosul province, including Dasin, as secure. In 1610, Dasin was administratively combined with the sanjak of Keshaf to form a single unit governed first by Nezer Beg and later by the Bahdinan prince Seyid Khan Beg. Despite this relative stability, localized conflicts continued. In 1616, an operation involving a figure named Heydar ibn Sheikh Dasin is recorded, and in 1629 disputes between Dasini groups and the Sheikh Bizni tribe led to violence, including attacks on caravans and retaliatory killings. Correspondence between the Ottoman authorities and Dasini leaders during this period indicates a functioning relationship between the two sides.

Around the same period, during the Ottoman-Safavid conflicts, Sultan Murad IV’s campaign of 1635, which resulted in the capture of Tabriz, included the participation of several Kurdish rulers. In a letter dated 30 October 1636 addressed to regional leaders, including Safar Beg, identified as a prince of the Dasinis, the sultan praised their loyalty and service to the Ottoman state and encouraged their continued role in maintaining order in the Mosul region.

During the first half of the 17th century, Yezidis became a very powerful entity under the leadership of Ezidi Mirza (Mîrza Paşayê Dasinî), a young, yet reputable military leader who gained fame after leading a counter-attack against Muslim raiders in his hometown of Bashiqa and inflicting a devastating defeat despite being outnumbered. Mirza Pasha Dasini was one of the most prominent Dasini princes of the Ottoman period, referenced across numerous Ottoman administrative sources. He was the second Dasini ruler after Ahmed Pasha to receive the title of Pasha and be appointed governor of an Ottoman sanjak. His earliest confirmed administrative role dates to 29 August 1644, when he was appointed Sanjakbeg of Sinjar. His involvement in regional affairs, however, likely predates this appointment.

Mirza's military career began during the prolonged Ottoman-Safavid conflict over Baghdad. Following the Safavid capture of the city in 1623, facilitated by the defection of the Ottoman commander Bekir Subashi, the Ottomans launched successive campaigns to recapture Baghdad over the following fifteen years. Mirza, described in sources as "one of the princes of Kurdistan", participated in these campaigns alongside his men, distinguishing himself for battlefield valor. Among those who witnessed his conduct was Qara Murad Pasha, then governor of Diyarbakır. When Qara Murad Pasha was promoted to Grand Vizier in 1649, he rewarded Mirza's long service by appointing him governor of the Mosul sanjak on 8 August 1650 and conferring upon him the title of Pasha.

In 1694, further inconsistencies appear in the administrative treatment of Dasin. During the wider Ottoman–Habsburg conflict of 1683–1699, the Ottoman state sought increased military support from its provincial territories, including the Kurdish emirates. At the end of November 1694, an order was issued from Istanbul to the governor of Diyarbakir and its subordinate sanjaks, calling for participation in the war and encouraging mobilization through religious rhetoric. A copy of this order was also sent to the prince of Dasin, although his name was not specified.

Many of the sanjaks affiliated with Diyarbakir did not comply fully with orders to provide troops for the European front. On 4 July 1697, the sultan issued a strongly worded directive criticizing these failures and warning that continued noncompliance would result in punishment. In the case of Dasin, a more severe measure had already been taken: on 22 November 1695, an order was issued to remove its emir permanently, abolish the sanjak, and erase its administrative record, reportedly due to his failure to participate in the campaign and his mismanagement of the territory. Despite this order, subsequent records indicate that Dasin was not entirely removed from the administrative system. In 1696, forces associated with Dasin are recorded as participating in operations against tribal unrest in southern Iraq.

=== The Conflict of 1705 and the False Mahdi ===
The background to the 1705 conflict involved two distinct figures who claimed to be the awaited Mahdi in the Bahdinan region. The first appeared during the governorship of Ali Pasha in Mosul in 1666, when a prominent Kurdish Sufi named Sayyid Sheikh Abdullah claimed that his twelve-year-old son Muhammad was the Mahdi, gathering tribal support and seizing several castles from the Bahdinan princes. The combined forces of the Bahdinan emirate and the Mosul sanjak eventually suppressed the movement.

The second claimant appeared in 1705, emerging amid an escalating conflict between the Dasini Yazidis led by Sheikhan and the Mizuri and Zebari tribes over control of Ain Sifni. The Yazidis had previously succeeded in recapturing the village from the two tribes, who had held it with the backing of the Bahdinan emirate. Following the Yazidi recovery of Ain Sifni, the Bahdinan emir Osman Beg continued to support the Yazidis, dispatching his brother Zubayr Beg at the head of several hundred armed men to reinforce their position and burn down villages of the Mizuri and Zebari. The tribal leaders sent letters to Osman Beg demanding the expulsion of the Yazidis from Ain Sifni, but he refused.

In response, the Mizuri and Zebari tribes united under a single command, rallied around the second Mahdi claimant. This claimant and his followers allied with the Mizuri and Zebari tribes launched a coordinated offensive into Sheikhan territory. Faced with the combined force, the Yazidis withdrew. The tribal coalition destroyed Ain Sifni, then attacked the villages of Bahzani and Bashiqa, killed approximately sixty of their inhabitants, both men and women included, and burned six additional villages. The named leaders of the tribal forces included Hasan Agha Zebari and, among the Mizuri, Bashir, Sherif, Mir Omar, and Qaplan.

The governor of Mosul, Yusuf Pasha, reported the events to Istanbul in a letter dated 11 April 1706, describing the attacks on Yazidi and mixed Christian and Mosulite settlements and their consequences for trade in Mosul. He requested a large-scale coordinated military response involving the provinces of Diyarbakir, Mosul, and Shahrazur, the emir of Hakkari Ibrahim Beg, and the commander of the Koy Sinjaq Ali Pasha. Given the mountainous terrain, he specified that cannons, gunpowder, ammunition, and pack animals to carry them would need to be requisitioned from Diyarbakir, as the Mosul garrison lacked the horses necessary to transport heavy equipment.

A sultan's representative, Khalil Agha, subsequently arrived in Mosul to supervise the mobilization of forces. Yusuf Pasha simultaneously wrote to Osman Beg and Zubayr Beg demanding the surrender of the named tribal leaders and warning that non-compliance would result in a military campaign to overthrow Bahdinan authority. He also called for the return of looted property and the payment of blood money for those killed.

The conflict generated competing petitions to the Ottoman sultan. The qadi of Mosul submitted a letter accusing the Yazidis and Zubayr Beg of aggression, characterizing the Mizuri and Zebari tribes as victims of provocation. In direct response, a group of scholars, notables, and prominent citizens of Mosul submitted a counter-petition to the sultan, laying out the full sequence of events: the tribal offensive, the role of the Mahdi claimant in uniting the tribes, and the primary responsibility of the Mizuri and Zebari for the destruction of Bahzani, Bashiqa, and the surrounding villages. They identified the root cause as the Bahdinan emirate's support for Yazidi control of Ain Sifni, and called for disciplinary action against the tribal leaders specifically named in the governor's correspondence.

The outcome of the planned Ottoman campaign is not confirmed in surviving sources. What is documented is that the internal instability of the Bahdinan emirate rendered coordinated action increasingly difficult. A rupture between Osman Beg and his brother Zubayr Beg resulted in the latter's killing in 1712, after which Osman Beg was removed from office and replaced by Bahram Pasha the Great.

=== Nader Shah's Invasion ===
Following Nader Khan's expulsion of Afghan invaders from Iran and his capture of Tabriz in 1730, the Ottoman state began preparing defensive measures against the new threat. An order dated 4 August 1730, preserved in imperial book number 136, was issued to the sanjakbeg of Dasin, then part of the Diyarbakir eyalet, instructing him to join Ottoman operations against the Afsharid advance.

During Nader Shah's siege of Mosul in 1743, his forces turned against the Dasin region directly. In August of that year, Afsharid troops attacked the Dasin country and carried out massacres of Yazidis and Christians, including at the Lalish temple, sparing neither women nor children. The Afsharid court historian Muhammad Kazim al-Marwi, in his biography of Nader Shah, provides a detailed account of the campaign against the Yazidis.

According to al-Marwi, residents of Altun Köprü approached Nader Shah after he took the town and complained that the Yazidis were blocking roads and described them in religiously charged terms as enemies of Islam. In response, Nader Shah dispatched a cavalry force of 12,000 horsemen to Mount Shablan (Mount Shabkan) between Duhok and Akre, described as the principal Yazidi stronghold, launching a surprise attack that killed and captured many. Following news of the assault, thousands of Yazidis reportedly gathered in the Valley of Shablan under a leader. Al-Marwi describes a pitched battle that ended in Yazidi defeat, after which Nader Shah ordered the execution of all prisoners and directed his forces against Yazidi villages, taking an estimated 30,000 captives, including women and children.

=== Late 18th-century & Decline of the Principality ===
From the mid-eighteenth century onward, the Dasin principality experienced a sustained decline in political and military significance. This resulted from the combined pressure of the Bahdinan emirate and the Ottoman Mosul province, compounded by the economic exhaustion caused by continuous warfare and the structural vulnerability of the Dasin region itself, which, lacking high mountainous terrain, offered limited natural defensibility compared to other Yazidi strongholds. As a consequence, the political and military center of gravity within the broader Yazidi community shifted progressively toward Sinjar, whose mountain provided a more defensible base. Historical records concerning the Yazidis from this period onward focus primarily on Sinjar rather than Sheikhan.

During the latter half of the eighteenth century, the Sheikhan principality came under the suzerainty of the Bahdinan emirate, one of the semi-autonomous Kurdish principalities that governed the Ottoman frontier regions in the east. According to the Dominican missionary Padre Maurizio Garzoni, who operated in the region as part of a mission active from 1759 to 1779, the princes of Amadia reserved the post of executioner exclusively for a Yazidi, on the grounds that a Yazidi would not hesitate to execute a Muslim.

Relations between the Mir of Sheikhan and the Amadia princes were marked by recurring tension. In 1770–71, Bedagh Beg, Mir of Sheikhan, participated in a rebellion against Ismail Pasha, prince of Amadia, but was captured and subjected to a financial penalty. Sixteen years later, his son Jolo Beg became involved in another revolt and was forced to flee into the hills. Jolo Beg was still serving as Mir in 1789–90, during which he led Sheikhan forces against raiding Tai Arabs in the region. The following year, however, he and his brother were put to death by Ismail Pasha, who appointed Khanjar Beg, drawn from the second-ranking Pismîr family, as the new Mir. The dynastic interruption proved short-lived: in 1791–92, Ismail Pasha quarrelled with Khanjar Beg and restored the old line by appointing Jolo Beg's son Hasan Beg as Mir.

Throughout this period of political turbulence, Lalish continued to function as an active pilgrimage center. Votive inscriptions at the sanctuary dated to 1779 and 1781 attest to the sustained piety and material means of pilgrims visiting the site, many of whom traveled from Sinjar.

During the latter half of the 18th century, the al-Jalili family, who served as the governors of Mosul, conducted a series of military campaigns against the Yazidis of the Shekhan principality. The first recorded direct confrontation between the Yazidis and the al-Jalili occurred during the tenure of ʿAbdulbaqi Pasha al-Jalili (1785–1786), who led an expedition against the Dina tribe, one of the largest Yazidi clans of the region.

According to an Ottoman document, while ʿAbdulbaqi's forces were engaged in looting, Namir ibn Simo, the leader of the Dina clan, killed him and routed his forces. This defeat deepened al-Jalili hostility toward the Yazidis and precipitated further military campaigns against them in subsequent decades.

=== Early 19th century ===
Under Hasan Beg, the Sheikhan principality entered a period of relative prosperity. In 1806 he oversaw the rebuilding of the Lalish sanctuary, consolidating its role as the central pilgrimage site of the Yazidi community. His reign ended with his treacherous murder at the hands of a prince of Amadia, an event that left a lasting impression on Yazidi collective memory. In 1820, the travellers Claudius James Rich and his wife Mary Rich, spending a night at a Yazidi village, heard a lament for the slain Mir performed by a blind guitarist named Lasso. Approximately fifty years after his death, a German orientalist transcribed a poem commemorating a battle between two Bahdinan princes in which warriors from Sheikhan and Dennedi tribe avenged Hasan Beg's killing.

Hasan Beg was succeeded as Mir by Salih Beg, who was regarded with considerable respect by the Yazidi community but was murdered by an adversary in Mosul. His death initiated a prolonged period of dynastic instability and internal strife within the principality. Order was eventually restored with the accession of Ali Beg, known as "the Great," a son of Mir Hasan Beg, who reunited the princely line.

=== The Yazidi Genocide by Mir Muhammed of Rawanduz (1832-1834) ===
The most catastrophic event in the recorded history of the Sheikhan principality was the genocidal campaign launched by Muhammad Pasha of Rawanduz, ruler of the Soran emirate, against the Yazidis of Sheikhan and Sinjar between 1832 and 1834. The immediate background to the campaign involved escalating hostility between the Yazidis and the Mizuri tribe.

In 1724, the Mizuri cleric Sheikh Abd-Allah Rabbatki had issued a fatwa declaring the Yazidis infidels and authorizing the killing of their men and the seizure of their property and women. In 1802, the Algushiyya clan of the Mizuri tribe attacked the Yazidi village of Ghabara in the western Sheikhan region, killing approximately one hundred Yazidis and occupying the Lalish temple for eight months. Two years later, in 1804, when the Mizuri tribe invaded Amadiya and imprisoned the Bahdinan emir Qubad Pasha and his brother, Yazidi forces of the Dina tribe responded to an appeal from the Bahdinan emir Ahmed Pasha, expelled the Mizuri from the city, and restored order.

Ali Beg I, son of Mir Hasan Beg, ruled as Mir of Sheikhan from approximately 1809, governing from his residence at the village of Baadre. He maintained the principality's vassal relationship with the Bahdinan emirate, which provided a degree of protection against hostile tribal forces operating under religious pretexts. The immediate trigger for the Rawanduz campaign was a political assassination arranged by the Bahdinan prince Muhammad Said Pasha, who recruited Ali Beg to eliminate the Mizuri chieftain Ali Agha Balatayi. Balatayi's nephew, the influential cleric Mullah Yahya Mizuri, then turned to Muhammad Pasha Rawanduzi for redress, issuing a fatwa blessing retaliatory action against both the Bahdinan princes and the Yazidis. Rawanduzi's own mufti, Mulla Muhammad Khatti, issued a further fatwa legitimizing the seizure of Yazidi blood and property.

Rawanduzi assembled a military force estimated at between 40,000 and 50,000 fighters and in early March 1832 crossed the Great Zab River, entering the Yazidi border village of Kallak-a-Dasiniyya, which marked the border between Yazidi territory and the Soran principality until the nineteenth century, and killing many of its inhabitants. Advancing village by village through Yazidi territory, his forces killed all males who fell into their hands. Thousands of Yazidi refugees fleeing toward Mosul were trapped and massacred at the mound of Kuyunjik when the city's governor burned the bridge to block Rawanduzi's advance. Lalish was plundered; Yazidi women and children sheltering in a cave beneath the sanctuary were suffocated when soldiers lit fires at the entrance. Approximately 10,000 prisoners were taken to Rawanduz and ordered to convert to Islam. Mir Ali Beg refused and was executed in late 1833, his body left hanging from the Rawanduz bridge for three days, in the valley now known as Gali Ali Beg.

Following the destruction of Sheikhan, Rawanduzi led his forces to Sinjar. Yazidi forces at Sinjar included those commanded by Ali Beg's wife, who led the defense of the mountain. After facing several defeats, Rawanduzi's forces killed and captured approximately 700 men before taking the district in 1834. Rawanduzi's dominance over the region proved short-lived: Ottoman military pressure forced his surrender, and he was subsequently murdered upon returning home from Istanbul.

=== Aftermath & Hussein Beg's reign ===
In the immediate aftermath of the Rawanduzi invasion, Ali Beg's young son Hussein Beg was taken into hiding in the Sinjar. Jasim Beg, of the senior branch of the Chol family, assumed the position of Mir of Sheikhan in his absence. At some point between December 1841 and autumn 1843, Jasim Beg's reign came to a violent end when Hussein Beg traveled from Sinjar to Esiyan, a village near Baadre, where he killed his cousin. Hussein Beg was subsequently elected Mir under the tutelage of Sheikh Nasr, the Baba Sheikh, who resided at Esiyan.

In 1849, the question of Yazidi liability to Ottoman military conscription was addressed through a formal petition. Hussein Beg, Sheikh Nasr, and twenty-eight other Yazidi chiefs addressed a letter to the Grand Vizier affirming their loyalty to the sultan and their readiness to serve, noting that their ancestors had served in the army of Murad IV. Given the severe depletion of Yazidi manpower resulting from previous massacres, they requested a five-year exemption from providing recruits in exchange for a tax payment, after which they would accept conscription. They further requested that Yazidis be formed into separate units or serve alongside Christian soldiers rather than being merged with Muslim troops. The Yazidi leaders declared themselves satisfied with the arrangements that followed, though implementation was delayed by administrative reorganization within the Ottoman state, and at one point Hussein Beg was briefly held hostage pending the arrival of a Yazidi contingent.

Four months into 1853, Hussein Beg was abruptly deposed by Helmy Pasha, the governor of Mosul, on the stated pretext of a dispute over substitute recruits owed by the Yazidis. The British vice-consul Hormuzd Rassam, who documented the events in detail, reported that the actual cause was the governor's anger at Sheikh Nasr's refusal to sell him a horse he coveted for a fraction of its value. The new Mir appointed by Helmy Pasha was Hussein Beg's brother-in-law Jasim Beg, whom Rassam described as "abhorred and excommunicated by the Kawals and Sheikh of their sect."

An Ottoman official escorted by cavalry conducted Jasim Beg to his new domain. Their first stop was Sheikh Nasr's house at Esiyan, where Hussein Beg was summoned. He arrived reluctantly and, according to Rassam's account, sat below the others upon arrival. The former Mir stated that he was obliged to the governor for appointing another Emir, and remarked ruefully that the post had left him heavily indebted. Rassam estimated his debts at 122,000 piastres. During a subsequent dispute over the surrender of the residence at Baadre, Jasim Beg spoke disrespectfully to Hussein Beg, whereupon bystanders shot Jasim Beg dead on the spot. One of Jasim Beg's followers drew his sword, and Hussein Beg struck him with his sword in return.

Hussein Beg rode to Baadre, gathered his family, and fled to Sinjar. Sheikh Nasr, initially returning to Mosul with the Ottoman official, was intercepted and freed by a large body of mounted Yazidis. In fear of reprisals, Sheikhan villagers abandoned their homes and left their fields untilled. Rassam, who had recently signed a crop-sharing agreement with Hussein Beg and constructed a new building at Baadre, reported the crisis to the British embassy, blaming the governor's conduct and accusing Mosul notables of conspiring to exculpate him before the Ottoman capital.

In June 1853, Helmy Pasha dispatched an expedition of 600 musketeers, 300 irregular cavalry, and 150 artillerymen with three field guns to Sinjar to collect back taxes and capture Hussein Beg. Hussein Beg evaded capture, escaping across the Zab River and taking shelter among the Tai Arabs of Adiabene. He was eventually restored to his position, though the circumstances of his rehabilitation are not recorded in available sources.

During the Crimean War, the strain on Ottoman military resources created conditions for a major Kurdish rebellion in the region. Yezdanshir Beg, nephew of the former Kurdish ruler Bedirkhan Beg, raised a force and seized Jezira b. Omar in November 1854, killing local Ottoman administrators and extending his control toward Zakho. Yezdanshir was known for his openly hostile views toward Yazidis; the American missionary Henry Lobdell recorded hearing him declare that he wished to drink the blood of every Yazidi, Jew, and Christian he encountered. At Redwan, a British vice-consular source reported an eyewitness account of Yezdanshir personally killing between twenty-five and thirty Yazidis, having offered a bounty for live Yazidis to execute.

In early 1855, Helmy Pasha organized a force to suppress the rebellion, comprising 2,000 Yazidi horsemen under Mir Hussein Beg. Hussein Beg, who according to Rassam recognized Yezdanshir as a more dangerous enemy than the Ottoman governor who had recently deposed him, led his forces against the rebels outside Zakho, defeating them and entering the town without resistance, which Hussein Beg formally captured "in the name of His Majesty the Sultan".

Following the defeat of Yezdanshir, the sultan received Hussein Beg in audience and awarded him the title of kapi çuhadari, keeper of the official gate. The two decades after the Crimean War were relatively quiet for the principality, but they brought a slow decline in both Hussein Beg's authority and his personal standing.

By 1860 a British traveller visiting Ain Sifni with a letter of introduction from Rassam reported being told of Hussein Beg's heavy drinking. He described the Mir, who visited him the following morning accompanied by a group of white-robed kawals, as a young man whose countenance suggested cunning and acuteness but whose manner that morning was sullen, later explained by the receipt earlier that day of a pressing demand for repayment of a debt owed to Rassam. Rassam himself reported in 1860 that Rassam himself noted that year that Hussein Beg was collecting taxes from his people at a higher rate than he was passing on to the authorities in Mosul, and by 1866 a French traveller reported that the sanjak's revenues had been leased out entirely to the Italian consular agent for 40,000 piastres annually.

In 1872 Midhat Pasha, the ambitious governor of Baghdad, moved to end the Yazidis' long exemption from Ottoman military conscription, sending an officer to Mosul to register eligible men. His recall before the process was completed forestalled a direct confrontation. His successor Rauf Pasha took a more measured approach, inviting the Yazidi leadership to submit a formal statement of their religious objections to service. Sheikh Nasr responded by dictating an exposé in Arabic, Turkish, and French, the first document ever to formally set out the rules of conduct prescribed by the Yazidi religion. Signed by Hussein Beg, Sheikh Nasr, and fifteen Sheikhan headmen and submitted in March 1873, the document became known as the 1872 Petition. Around 1875 the Ottoman government confirmed the Yazidi exemption from military service, though the rate of the commutation tax remained unsettled for years afterward.

Around the same period Hussein Beg was arrested and interned in Mosul on grounds of stirring up unrest in the Sheikhan. During his detention his younger brother Abdi Beg assumed leadership of the community. Two of Hussein's sons, Hadi and Hasan, attempted to seize the sanjak and appropriate the princely revenues, while two other sons, Mirza and Ali, supported their uncle Abdi. After a year the two rebels were defeated and killed. Hussein Beg's wife traveled in disguise to his place of confinement to inform him of what had happened. He replied that he would rather they had seized the emirate than lost their lives.

A German traveller who visited Hussein Beg in Mosul in December 1875 found him bedridden in a large, cold, unheated room. He wrote that the expression in Hussein Beg's eyes confirmed what people said, that the Mir, worn down by the betrayals of his family and the burdens of his position, had given himself over to drink. After three years of internment he was released, but little of his former authority remained. The power of life and death was stripped from the Mir, an Ottoman administrator was posted to Baadre, and criminal cases passed to the regular courts. Hussein Beg died in 1879, aged fifty.

The succession that followed was settled in characteristically direct fashion. The eldest son Ali Beg stood aside in favor of the third son Mirza Beg, but the second son refused to accept this. After a prolonged dispute the two brothers rode armed over the hill above Ain Sifni and disappeared from view. After a while Mirza Beg came back alone and was proclaimed Mir. Nervous about how the Ottomans would view what had happened, he withdrew to Sinjar, but was eventually confirmed in his position after paying an indemnity. Throughout the interregnum Abdi Beg had kept the community together, with Sheikh Nasr at his side.

=== Reign of Mirza Beg (1879–1899) ===
Following Mirza Beg's confirmation as Mir, Sheikh Nasr disclosed for the first time the structure of the principality's revenues. Kawals traveled circuits across the scattered Yazidi communities carrying the sacred sanjaks as objects of veneration and proof of their authority. Of the original seven or eight sanjaks, only five remained. One had been pawned to a Christian in Mosul as security against a debt left by Hussein Beg; another had passed into the possession of the French vice-consul Siouffi, reportedly purchased from a kawal who had stolen it. The remaining five covered regular circuits: Sinjar and Jezira twice yearly, the western communities including Aleppo annually, the Siirt region once a year, the districts of Muş, Van, and Bayezid with communities across the Russian border annually, and the Sheikhan itself three times a year.

Pressure on the community intensified through the 1880s as Ottoman authorities moved to place the Yazidis on the same conscription basis as Muslims. In the spring of 1891 a commission arrived from Istanbul carrying a message from Sultan Abdul Hamid urging the Yazidis to convert to Islam, on the grounds that they had originally been Muslims. Mirza Beg and the sheikhs rejected the claim directly, responding that their religion predated Islam by thousands of years and asking how they could have strayed from a faith that came after their own. The Yazidi chiefs were then reminded that their commutation taxes were two years in arrears and were imprisoned, though later released on bail.

In July 1891 Mirza Beg, his brother Ali Beg, the chief sheikh, and the principal village chiefs were summoned to Mosul and ordered by the governor, in the presence of officers and garrison troops, to accept conscription on behalf of their community. When they protested that they could not impose service on unwilling subjects, lots were drawn from among the thirty-eight Yazidis present. Twenty-two were selected, including Mirza Beg, his brother, and several men over fifty, all of whom were taken to the barracks and forced into military uniform. Mirza Beg sent word to Siouffi, now the only foreign consular representative in Mosul, who advised him to remain calm while he sought to intervene.

In July 1892, between governors, a new figure arrived by kelek from Istanbul: Lieutenant-General Omar Wehbi Pasha, with broad and undefined powers and a reputation for energy and connections to both the Grand Vizier and the Minister of War. He moved quickly. A punitive expedition to Sinjar resulted in ten Yazidis killed, thirty-five wounded, and one hundred and twenty taken prisoner. A Sheikhan chief who repeatedly ignored summons to Mosul had his village destroyed and its inhabitants killed.

Intimidated, Mirza Beg led a delegation of around forty Sheikhan chiefs to Mosul. On 19 August 1892, Omar Wehbi Pasha convened the provincial council and formally called on the Yazidi leaders to embrace Islam. About a quarter of the chiefs refused and were beaten; one later died from his injuries. The remainder, headed by Mirza Beg, pronounced the Muslim profession of faith. The general telegraphed Istanbul that several thousand Yazidi families had converted, an announcement he hoped to make true by dispatching religious teachers, administrators, and soldiers into every Sheikhan village. Mirza Beg and two other princes were rewarded with the title of pasha and a monthly salary. His brother Ali Beg refused to convert and was imprisoned.

In mid-September, without notifying the governor, Omar Wehbi Pasha dispatched a punitive expedition into the Sheikhan under his 25-year-old son Assem Bey. Unlike the Sinjar mountaineers, the Sheikhan Yazidis were predominantly field laborers with no means of resisting a military force. Villages were destroyed; killings, robberies, and rapes were reported. In one incident recorded by several sources, a group of young village girls who had hidden in a wheatfield were killed when soldiers set the crop alight. Omar Wehbi Pasha later blamed the death toll of three to four hundred on Siouffi and others he accused of inciting the Yazidis. Survivors fled north into the mountains or made their way to Sinjar.

The expedition's primary target was the sanctuary at Lalish. Ottoman forces confiscated a significant collection of sacred objects. Official documents record the confiscated items as five bronze peacock figures, a bronze ram, a cast bronze snake, a bronze nightingale known as the Shahrur, a bronze rod, a bronze cup , a rosary, a comb and a wooden staff. The soldiers failed to locate the principal peacock statue or the two sacred books. The confiscated objects were transferred to the Ottoman barracks in Mosul and subsequently reported to have been moved to army corps headquarters in Baghdad. The expedition continued into Bashiqa and Bahzani, where a number of religious shrines were destroyed. Villagers were ordered to adopt Arab dress, and use of the word Yazidi was prohibited.

Ali Beg, who had refused conversion, was imprisoned and tortured. After two months orders arrived from Istanbul exiling him to Kastamonu in northern Anatolia.

In October 1892 a second expedition of five battalions under Assem Bey advanced into the Sinjar. Yazidi fighters on the lower slopes of the mountain feigned conversion and offered to guide the column to settlements higher up. After leading the soldiers into a narrow gorge after dark, the guides rejoined Yazidi forces positioned on both sides of the pass, who opened fire. The troops also discovered that their cartridges had been tampered with and rendered useless. The column retreated with an estimated one hundred men killed. On 9 December 1892 Sultan Abdul Hamid dismissed Omar Wehbi Pasha by telegram and ordered him to remain in Mosul pending a commission of inquiry into his conduct. He returned to Istanbul in disgrace the following spring.

A settlement was reached under the subsequent governor, Aziz Pasha. Under the settlement, the Yazidis of Sheikhan were permitted to practice their religion again. Mirza Beg and the other prominent converts reverted openly to their old faith. The price was enforcement of military service, continuation of Islamic schools in the villages on a voluntary basis, and the surrender of the Lalish sanctuary to Muslim dervishes, who established a retreat there and opened a religious school. The sanjaks and other sacred objects remained in Ottoman custody.

In 1894 the Spanish journalist Saturnino Ximenez, traveling with the authorization of Aziz Pasha, visited the Sheikhan and accompanied Mirza Beg on a return visit to Lalish. The procession, which included the Mir, his brother, his sons, and fifty armed Yazidi horsemen, climbed to the sanctuary in silence. As the leading riders came within sight of the shrine, a hymn began that was taken up along the entire column. The Muslim dervishes did not attempt to prevent the pilgrims from entering. After some negotiation the dervish sheikh agreed to open the sanctuary, which had been converted into a mosque. Inside, the sanctuary had been converted for use as a mosque and its contents removed. Mirza Beg and the Yazidi pilgrims found the shrines stripped of their sacred objects. The sanctuary of Sheikh Adi was visited for the first time since the forced conversion.

Mirza Beg died in 1899. His brother Ali Beg, who had refused to convert and had spent years in exile in Kastamonu, was permitted to return in 1898 following the intervention of the British embassy. Following Mirza Beg's death, Ali Beg was elected Mir at the age of fifty-three, though the Ottomans confined his authority to religious affairs. Together with his wife Mayan, a daughter of Abdi Beg who had shared his exile, he began rebuilding the community's religious and material life.

=== Reign of Ali Beg II (1899-1913) & Recovery of Lalish ===
Following his return from exile, Ali Beg, aided by the Ottoman official Sadiq Damluji, succeeded in recovering the Lalish sanctuary, though the sacred objects removed during the 1892 campaign remained impounded in Baghdad. The Mir maintained relations with British consular officials, missionaries, and travelers including Gertrude Bell, in part out of gratitude for the diplomatic intervention that had secured his release from exile.

In 1909 Ali Beg's brother-in-law Ismail Beg, a younger son of Abdi Beg who had spent years traveling among Yazidi communities as a self-appointed religious emissary, traveled to Istanbul to take advantage of the freedoms introduced by the Young Turk revolution. There, with the assistance of Armenian church officials, he obtained an imperial edict countersigned by the Sheikh-ul-Islam that recognized the Yazidi religion, forbade forced conversions, and ordered the return of the impounded sacred objects. When the text was telegraphed to Mosul for ratification, Ali Beg repudiated it, stating that Ismail had no authority to negotiate on behalf of the community. The edict was suspended and Ismail returned to Iraq empty-handed. Ismail believed that Ali Beg's motive was fear that the edict would become a platform for Ismail's claim to succeed him as Mir. A bitter feud between Ismail and his sister Mayan Khatun, Ali Beg's wife, developed over the following years.

The sacred objects were eventually returned to the Yazidis by Suleiman Nazif Pasha, who governed Mosul from September 1913 to December 1914. By that time Ali Beg was dead. In the autumn of 1912 the missionary Wigram, visiting Baadre, found Ali Beg a tall man of around forty-five, wearing a dark brown cloak with gold embroidery and a red turban, who spoke warmly of England and of his traditional friendship with the Nestorian patriarch. Wigram noted that the Mir was suffering from a persistent cold and that his manner was melancholy. The last guest to stay at the palace was Safr Aga, chief of the Doski Kurds, who spent a night there early in 1913. The following morning Ali Beg was found murdered in his bed.

The circumstances of the murder were never conclusively established. One account attributed it to two members of the Pismir clan, Fattah and Ali, sons of Jolo ibn Jolo, whose family ranked second only to the Chol dynasty and were the only other family eligible to contract marriage with it. A third Pismîr brother reportedly escaped to Sinjar, where he lived in hiding for fifteen years before dying blind. Another account identified Hussein Beg, son of Mir Mirza Beg, as among those who carried out the killing. A further theory, current among British writers, pointed to a connection involving Mayan Khatun and the Doski chief who had been present in the palace that night. Ismail's own memoirs, though frequently critical of his sister, do not raise this possibility.

Mayan Khatun assumed guardianship of Ali Beg's young son Said Beg and administration of the princely revenues, blocking Ismail's candidacy on grounds of suspected complicity in the murder. Retribution against the suspects was swift. According to Mayan Khatun's own account, she ordered eight members of the princely clan Jolo ibn Jolo, his wife, his four sons, and two daughters brought to Baadre. After sentence was passed she watched her bodyguard shoot all of them except the two girls, whom she subsequently adopted.

With Mayan Khatun in control of the princely revenues and resistant to his claims, Ismail pursued an unconventional remedy. Learning that two kawals dispatched from Lalish to carry the Sinjar sanjak around the Yazidi villages were wanted by the Ottoman courts, he obtained a military escort, intercepted the kawals as they crossed the Tigris, and arranged for the sanjak to be left with a village headman while the prisoners were returned to Mosul. He then rode off with the sanjak to Bashika and persuaded two British CMS missionaries, Dr George Stanley and Miss Ellen Martin, to conceal it in a chest at the mission house.

Arrested but refusing to reveal its location, Ismail eventually reached a settlement: he was awarded custody of the Sinjar sanjak, entitling him to a share of alms collected in the Sinjar and eastern Anatolia, while Said Beg retained the Sheikhan, Aleppo, and Moscow sanjaks. Ismail subsequently lost the sanjak while traveling through the village of Hemduna. While he slept, the kawals accompanying him removed the sanjak from its bag and substituted a standard, while his brother Jolo stole his horse and rifle. The sanjak was returned to Said Beg and Mayan Khatun. Ismail recovered neither the peacock nor the revenues attached to it, and eventually accepted a settlement negotiated by Suleiman Nazif Pasha allowing him to settle at Beled Sinjar.

In May 1914 Suleiman Nazif Pasha announced that the 68,000 Yazidis in the province of Mosul would be recognized as a distinct religious community, free from interference in the practice of their religion. The sacred peacocks were to be restored and the Mir was to receive a monthly salary. The settlement decree bore the signatures of the entire Ottoman cabinet, including that of Enver Pasha, Minister of Defence. The archives record that the Yazidis had requested a higher salary than was granted and that they agreed in the final settlement not to join the French or English religious communities. Six months after the agreement was reached, the French and British missionaries were evacuated from Iraq. The Ottoman Empire had entered the First World War.

=== The First World War (1914–1918) ===
During the First World War the Yazidi communities in Iraq were largely sheltered from the wider catastrophe by geography and by the prudence of Mayan Khatun. The closest the fighting came to the Yazidi heartlands was Bitlis to the north, captured by Russian forces in March 1916 and retaken by Ottoman forces five months later, and Rowanduz to the east, briefly occupied in mid-1916.

When British forces captured Baghdad in March 1917 and pushed north, the strategic importance of the Sheikhan region became apparent. Ottoman lines of communication with their forces in Iraq followed the old caravan route from Aleppo to Mosul. From their positions in the region, Yazidi tribesmen were able to monitor Ottoman movements and intercept supplies.

British forces entered Mosul after the armistice. Colonel Gerard Leachman arrived as Political Officer with his assistant Colonel Nalder and Ismail Beg. Leachman convened an assembly of all Yazidi leaders in Mosul. A delegation from the Sheikhan arrived headed by the chief sheikh and Mir Said Beg, whom Nalder described as a delicate and weak-looking person of about thirty, although he was in fact eighteen. Leachman announced the administrative arrangements for the Sinjar and then turned to the question of the princely revenues. Mayan Khatun arrived and negotiated a compromise with the Sinjar leadership: the revenues from the sanjaks would be divided between Said Beg and Ismail. Leachman approved the arrangement.

The Yazidi leadership subsequently participated in a consultation on the future government of Iraq being conducted across the province of Mosul. The Yazidi declaration, signed in the name of the whole Yazidi nation in the vilayets of Diyarbakir and Mosul by approximately fifty persons including all the leading Yazidis, stated that they wished to be subjects of Great Britain and would never agree to Arab government over them.

== Modern period (1918–present) ==
=== The British Mandate Period (1918–1932) ===
Ismail Beg's share of the revenue arrangement proved short-lived. Within months he was detained in Baghdad on the grounds that the Sinjar Yazidis did not want him there, and Said Beg regained undivided authority over the princely revenues. Nalder reported that Said Beg was managed entirely by his mother Mayan, whom he described as a masterful woman whose personal interests did not always coincide with the best interests of the community.

In 1925 the kawals carrying the Sinjar sanjak were robbed by assailants hired by Naif Beg, a Chol prince whose daughter was married to Said Beg. The British authorities intervened promptly, recovered the sanjak, and apprehended Naif Beg. Mayan Khatun traveled to Sinjar personally to ensure the matter was resolved.

In 1931, the Yazidi leadership prepared the Sheikhan Memorial for a conference with the British High Commissioner for Iraq Sir Francis Humphrys. Signed by the Baba Sheikh and the heads of the other Yazidi religious orders, it set out the fundamental rules of the community and stated that the Mir could not be dismissed or removed except by natural death. The government accepted this principle and confirmed the Mir's entitlement to the princely revenues by official decree.

A dispute over the Sinjar sanjak followed immediately. After the 1931 circuit of the mountain, the faqir carrying the sanjak refused to hand it to Said Beg and declared he would deliver it only to the Mir's cousin Hussein Beg. Said Beg filed a petition signed by 8,000 tribesmen demanding its return. The governor of Mosul held the sanjak in escrow for three months until instructions arrived from Baghdad confirming it belonged to Said Beg. It was returned to the Mir in September 1932.

=== The Iraqi Monarchy Period & Reign of Mir Said Beg ===
Said Beg's reign was marked by personal instability and sustained tension between his conduct and the responsibilities of his position. By 1930 the Iraqi government and its British advisers had received formal complaints that Said Beg was spending the princely revenues on personal dissipation in Mosul and mortgaging Yazidi villages to lawyers to fund further debts. Consideration was given to placing the Yazidis under the laws regulating Christian and Jewish communities, and opinions were sought from notables of both Sinjar and Sheikhan.

Said Beg married five times before the age of twenty-seven. Following the death of Ismail Beg in March 1933, Mayan Khatun proposed that Said Beg marry Ismail's daughter Wansa, then sixteen, as a means of healing the family feud. After deliberation the arrangement was accepted. Wansa abandoned plans for a career in medicine and married Said Beg in 1934, moving to the new Stone Palace at Baadre as his official consort.

Wansa's marriage to Said Beg produced one child, a daughter named Leila, who died in infancy. While Said Beg remained largely secluded in the palace, Wansa and Mayan Khatun traveled together through the Sheikhan villages. The anthropologist Henry Field, who visited Baadre in June 1934, described Said Beg as a man of low vitality whose quiet, sad expression lacked what Field characterized as the typical Yazidi quality, and noted that his mind was no longer keen.

Following Iraqi independence in 1932, the new Baghdad government enacted universal conscription in 1934. The Yazidis of Sinjar demanded exemption or the right to serve in separate units; both requests were rejected. In September 1935 an Iraqi military force supported by aircraft, artillery, and armored cars occupied the mountain. The only armed resistance came from the Mihirkan tribe. After a brief engagement the rebels ran out of ammunition. Courts martial adjudicated over 400 cases; nine leaders were hanged and more than 300 received sentences ranging from ten years to life, though many were released the following year. Said Beg had counseled compliance; Mayan Khatun's authority over the Sinjar was further consolidated by the removal of the principal opposition figures.

In early 1938 Said Beg informed Wansa that a decision had been taken within the princely household to kill her brother Yezidkhan Beg, Ismail's teenage son, on suspicion of plotting to establish himself as ruler of the Sinjar. Said Beg told her he could not change what had been decided. Wansa pulled a revolver and fired five shots, wounding the Mir in the left leg and left arm. She escaped to Mosul and then Baghdad with her Armenian chauffeur Hagop, whose family Ismail had once helped. The chauffeur was subsequently tortured but refused to reveal her location. Wansa eventually crossed into Syria disguised as a nurse and settled in Aleppo among the Yazidi community there.

Said Beg recovered from his wounds and never remarried after Wansa. On 28 July 1944 he died in Mosul. Mayan Khatun presided over the succession. Her candidate was Said Beg's thirteen-year-old son Tahsin Beg, born of his wife Khokhe. Mayan argued that he was better born than his brothers and offered to serve as regent until he came of age. After deliberation Tahsin Beg was confirmed as Mir, with Mayan Khatun as regent.

=== Succession of Mir Tahsin Beg & Mayan Khatun's Second Regency (1944-1957) ===
Following Said Beg's death, Mayan Khatun, then in her seventies, presided over the selection of his successor. Her candidate was Tahsin Beg, Said Beg's thirteen-year-old son by his wife Khokhe, whom she commended as better born than his brothers and as possessing an alert and intelligent character. She offered to serve as regent until he came of age. One faction supported an alternative candidate, Suwaru Beg, but the assembly agreed on Tahsin Beg.

The years of Mayan Khatun's second regency were described as prosperous and uneventful. In 1948 the principality's aggregate revenues amounted to 8,185 Iraqi dinars. The Sinjar sanjak yielded 4,000 dinars annually, the Sheikhan sanjak 1,500 dinars, the Sheikh Adi mausoleum 1,500 dinars, and the remaining shrines contributed the balance.

In 1949 the Ottoman official and historian Sadiq Damluji, whose association with the Yazidi community spanned more than forty years, completed his major work on the community. Of Mayan Khatun he wrote that she was wise, intelligent, and far-sighted, feared and respected by her people, and that none dared oppose her. He described her as arrogant and tight-fisted but noted that the grandeur and nobility of her character were evident to all who met her, and that she was at that time the effective ruler of the community. He concluded that it was hard to imagine how things would be managed after her death, given that she was approaching the end of her life and that everything about her was old except her mind.

Mayan Khatun died on 31 December 1957 at the age of eighty-three, the same year that a revolution overthrew the Iraqi monarchy. The Yazidi communities in Iraq, Syria, and Transcaucasia had emerged from the Second World War intact, the decisive battles of that conflict having been fought far from the Yazidi homelands.

=== Reign of Mir Tahsin Beg (1944-2019) ===
Following his coming of age, Tahsin Beg developed a close relationship with King Faisal II of Iraq. In the 1950s he became the first Mir of Sheikhan to request the governor of Mosul to open schools in Yazidi villages, a significant departure from the traditional Yazidi prohibition on formal education. He also began reestablishing ties with Yazidi diaspora communities that had been severed by the redrawing of Middle Eastern borders after the First World War.

In 1970 the Iraqi authorities announced the uncovering of a plot against President Ahmed Hassan al-Bakr and accused Tahsin Beg of involvement, an allegation he denied throughout his life. He fled to the mountains of Kurdistan and joined Kurdish rebel forces. Following the collapse of the Kurdish liberation movement in March 1975 he crossed into Iran and subsequently emigrated to London, later settling in West Berlin and Celle at the invitation of the Yazidi community in West Germany, from where he attempted to maintain his authority over the community.

During his exile, the Ba'ath government recognized a rival claimant, Bayazid, son of Ismail Beg, as Yazidi emir and opened an official office in Baghdad for him. Bayazid publicly claimed descent from the Umayyads through Sheikh Adi and prepared genealogical documents tracing the princely lineage to the founder of the Umayyad dynasty. The Ba'ath promotion of this rival claim was part of a broader policy of encouraging Arab identity among the Yazidis to discourage their participation in the Kurdish national movement. Bayazid was never able to establish authority over the Yazidi community, however, and eventually withdrew from the political arena. In Sinjar his brother Mu'awi maintained significant influence among the local Yazidi population into the late 1970s. Control over Lalish remained the decisive factor in determining legitimate authority, and neither rival claimant succeeded in securing it.

Tahsin Beg was pardoned by the Iraqi authorities in 1981 and returned to Iraq.

Following the establishment of Kurdish self-government in northern Iraq in 1992, a de facto border divided the Yazidi areas. The portion containing Lalish and several adjacent villages came under the Kurdistan Regional Government. The princely family responded by designating Tahsin Beg's brother Kheri Beg as representative head of the Yazidis within the Kurdistan administration, while Tahsin Beg retained authority over Yazidis living under Baghdad's control and maintained custody of Lalish. Kheri Beg also served as a member of the Kurdistan Parliament on the list of the Kurdistan Democratic Party. Following Kheri Beg's death the arrangement was dissolved, as the boundary between the two administrative zones had by then shifted.

After the fall of the Ba'ath regime in 2003, instability spread through areas formerly under Baghdad's control, particularly in Nineveh Governorate. Islamist organizations began targeting Yazidi and Christian communities, and Yazidis also faced pressure from Kurdish authorities seeking to extend their demographic presence into mixed areas. From 2003 onward, Yazidi communities were in some cases displaced from their lands to make way for Muslim Kurdish settlement. Tahsin Beg, known for his generally restrained and pro-Kurdish public stance, publicly criticized these developments in an interview with the Kurdish television channel KNN on 14 October 2010, stating that Yazidis were being oppressed by the Muslim Kurdish population, forced from their lands, and subjected to the abduction of women. He called for special administrative status for the Sheikhan and Sinjar districts within Kurdistan and advocated for the inclusion of Yazidis as a recognized religious community in the Iraqi constitution with proportional parliamentary representation. The Yazidis ultimately received one seat in the Iraqi parliament despite constituting approximately two percent of the population.

In August 2014 Islamic State forces attacked Sinjar, initiating a genocide against the Yazidi population. By this period Tahsin Beg was in serious ill health and was receiving treatment periodically in Hanover. Tahsin Beg died in 2019.

=== Succession Crisis and the Reign of Hazim Beg (2019–present) ===
Tahsin Beg died without designating an heir or publicly endorsing any candidate for the position of Mir, leaving the question of succession to be resolved by the community. His eldest son Hazim, born in 1963, held a nominal advantage by birth order, but his candidacy was complicated by the non-Mir origin of his mother and by his having served as a member of the Kurdistan Parliament on the KDP list between 2009 and 2013, which led many Yazidis to perceive him as a party protégé. His main rival was Kamiran Beg, son of Kheri Beg, who was married to Tahsin Beg's daughter and also enjoyed a degree of KDP support.

After several months during which the KDP refrained from openly intervening, the party effectively imposed a resolution. On 24 July 2019 Hazem declared himself Mir, describing the outcome as a compromise reached with his immediate family. His inauguration was held three days later on 27 July, with some Yazidi customary rituals reported to have been omitted. To address rival claims, Hazem announced the appointment of four deputies, including Kamiran Beg as deputy for religious affairs under the title of "marjae dini". Critics noted that this title, without precedent in Yazidi tradition, effectively appropriated functions belonging to the Baba Sheikh.

Hazem's accession generated significant opposition within the community. His subsequent public statements, including the assertion that the Yazidis are Kurds and that Sinjar is Kurdistan, and his expressed gratitude to KDP leadership for resolving the succession crisis, reinforced perceptions of his dependence on the party. In early August 2019 a faction of the Sinjar clergy elected a separate Mir, Naif Daoud Beg, and shortly afterward a member of the Mir family in Germany, Amawi Muawi Beg, declared himself Mir of the Yazidi diaspora. Several other individuals also advanced claims to the position.

The succession crisis prompted efforts within the diaspora to draft a community constitution that would formalize the governance of Yazidi religious life, limit the Mir's authority to a symbolic role while retaining the position as nominal religious and secular head, and expand the Supreme Spiritual Council to include diaspora representatives and senior religious figures.

== Territory ==
The core territory of the Daseni Principality encompassed the northern and eastern foothills surrounding Mosul, along with key centers such as Sheikhan (its main base), the holy site of Lalish, Dohuk-e Dasinya (meaning "Dohuk of the Daseni/Yazidis"), Kalak-e Dasinya ("Kalak of the Daseni/Yazidis"), Simel, and the Sinjar region. For a period in the 16th century, beginning around 1534, the Daseni sphere of influence and governance was temporarily extended southeast to include Erbil and Kirkuk, when the Ottoman Sultan appointed the Daseni Mir, Hussein Beg, as governor over the former Soran Emirate domains.

=== Administrative Status within the Ottoman System ===
Under Ottoman rule, the Sheikhan Principality functioned as an autonomous emirate within the Sanjak of Mosul. Its territory was centered on the Sheikhan region and included Mount Sinjar as an administrative district. Like other autonomous emirates in the Ottoman Empire, Sheikhan retained internal self-government under its own rulers. The institution of the Mir and the autonomous status of the principality persisted until the dismantling of local emirates in the late Ottoman period and the end of the First World War.

In the Mosul Sanjak tahrir registers of 1523, 1540, 1557, and 1575, the Dasini are mentioned as a tribe affiliated with the Mosul Sanjak. In the Accounts Book of the Provinces of Diyarbakir, Arab, and Dhu'l-Qadriyah dated to 1530, the Dasini are recorded as a “community” attached to the Mosul sanjak. In 1586, the sanjaks of Zakho, Erbil, Nusaybin, Bajwan, Akçakale, and Eski Mosul were ordered to form the Mosul Province. Although the Dasini principality was not explicitly mentioned, its territories became part of the newly established province.

The 1523 tahrir register of the Mosul Sanjak lists Sheikhan as a village belonging to a Dasini individual named Sheikh Haydar. By 1540, however, the same areas were described as being under the authority of the emir of Bahdinan. The Bahdinan rulers justified this claim by stating that Sheikhan belonged to the district of Deir Maqlub, which they considered part of the Bahdinan emirate. In 1572, the towns of Bashiqa and Bahzani, important centers associated with the Dasini principality, were described as territories under the authority of Bahram Beg, son of Sultan Husayn Beg. In 1610, the emir of Bahdinan sent forces against the sanjaks of Dasin and Keshaf, and their ruler Nezer Beg was removed from office.

In 1608, the Ottoman historian Abdülkadir Efendi included the “Kurds of Dasin” among the sanjaks of the Mosul vilayet, which constitutes the earliest indication that Dasin had attained the status of an official Ottoman sanjak.

In the official Ottoman registers, the earliest confirmed reference to the principality of Dasin as a recognized sanjak dates to 1610. This information appears in register no. 79 and in the tevcihat record no. 1481, concerning the unification of the two regions of Keshaf and Dasin into a single sanjak. The record states that the sanjak was initially granted to Nezer Beg Dasini, and subsequently to the prince of Bahdinan, Seyid Khan Beg, who had previously taken control of it by force. In late June 1611, an order was issued to return the sanjak to Nezer Beg.

The unification of Keshaf and Dasin into a single sanjak continued thereafter. On 30 October 1636, Sultan Murad IV (r. 1623–1640) addressed a letter to the holder of the sanjak of Keshaf and to Safar Beg, described as the prince of the Dasin tribe, indicating that the sanjak had again been transferred to Nezer Beg in subsequent years. These records indicate that the ruler of Dasin held the position of sanjakbeg within the classical Ottoman administrative structure through the sanjak of Keshaf, while his hereditary domain continued to be referred to as the “Dasin tribe”.

The earliest reference in the available sources to the emirate of Dasin as a sanjak separate from the sanjak of Keshaf dates to 1640. On 6 January 1640, the Ottoman tevcihat register records that the sanjak of Dasin was granted to a prince named Suleiman Beg. At that time, Dasin was administratively attached to the Diyarbakir Sanjak.

When the Ottoman traveler Evliya Çelebi visited the region in 1656, he wrote that the Sanjak of Mosul consisted of the sanjaks of Mosul, Bajwan, Tikrit, Eski Mosul, Hurun, Bane, and Mutofdag. He did not list Dasin as an official sanjak. However, elsewhere he mentioned that the castle of “Prince of Dasin” was located north of the Minare district, indicating the continued presence of a Dasini ruling authority in the area. Shortly after Evliya Çelebi’s visit, the Ottoman geographer Katib Çelebi described Kurdistan and its Ottoman provinces and sanjaks. He stated that the Province of Mosul consisted of the sanjaks of Eski Mosul, Bajwanlu, Tikrit, Harûbana, Qara Dasinî, and Budasni. His account suggests that the territory of Dasin at that time was divided into two sanjaks.

Ottoman records and documents from the late seventeenth and early eighteenth centuries indicate that the Principality of Dasin had become an Ottoman sanjak at the level of yurtluk and ocaklık, designations used for hereditary or semi-autonomous holdings within the imperial administrative system.

In late November 1694, Sultan Ahmed II sent a letter to the governor of Diyarbakir urging Muslims to wage war against European powers. A copy of this order was also sent to the emir of the Sanjak of Dasin. This correspondence indicates that during this period Dasin was attached to the Province of Diyarbakir. The letter does not mention the name of the emir then governing the principality. The name Dasin appears among the sanjaks of Diyarbakir in the Defter-i Tevcihat registers dating from 1673 to 1702. One entry records that the prince who governed this sanjak refused to participate in an Ottoman military campaign in Europe. As a result, he was dismissed from his post, and on 22 November 1695 the sanjak was removed from the registers and declared closed. This entry suggests that the sanjak of Dasin was abolished at that time and that its territories were incorporated into neighboring sanjaks.

However, in another register covering the years 1717–1730, Dasin is again listed as a sanjak among those of the Sanjak of Diyarbakir. The name of the prince to whom the sanjak was assigned is not recorded. In the tahwil register covering the years 1756–1792, Dasin is again listed among the sanjaks of the Eyalet of Diyarbakir, though no governing emir is named

== Notable figures ==
- Mir Jafar Dasni, leader of an uprising in 838
- Sheikh Hasan, 13th-century Yezidi saint and ruler
- Sherfedin, 13th-century Yezidi saint and ruler
- Ezidi Mîrza, 17th-century governor of Mosul and Yezidi leader
- Mir Hussein Beg Dasini, 16th-century Yezidi prince and sanjakbey
- Mir Ali Beg I of Sheikhan, 19th-century Yezidi prince
- Meyan Khatun, 20th-century Yezidi princess
- Mir Ismail Chol Beg, 20th-century Yezidi prince
- Wansa, princess
- Mir Tahsin Saied Beg, prince
- Hazim Tahsin Beg, prince

== See also ==
- List of Kurdish dynasties and countries
- Yazidi social organization
- Yazidis
- Ezdikhan principality
- Kilis Emirate
