= Mir Ismail Chol Beg =

Mîr of Yazidis

Ismail Chol Beg
- Mîr
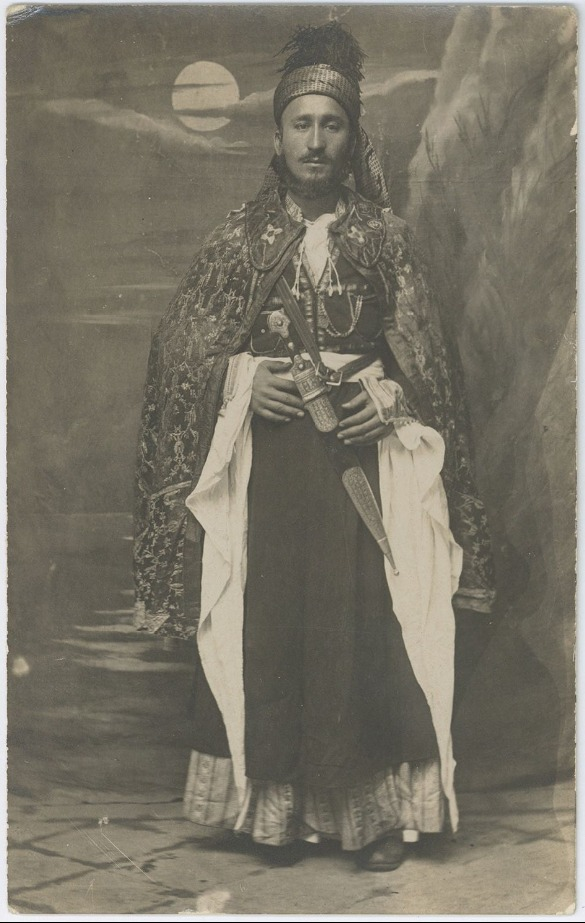
- Photograph of Ismail Beg, c. 1920–1926, by Gertrude Bell (1868–1926)
- Born: c. 1888-1889; Baadre, Iraq
- Died: 1933
- Issue: Abdulkarim Beg, Yezidkhan Beg, Bayezid Beg, Muawiya Beg, Wansa
- lineage group: Qatanî
- Dynasty: Sheikhan principality
- Father: Mir Abdi Beg
- Religion: Yazidism

Mir Ismail Chol Beg (Kurdish: Mîr Simayîl Çol Beg, b. c. 1888/1889 in Baadre, d. 1933) was a Yazidi prince (Mîr), political leader, and reform advocate active during the late Ottoman Empire and the early British Mandate in Iraq. A member of the hereditary Yazidi princely family of Sheikhan, he became one of the most influential Yazidi figures of the early twentieth century. Ismail Chol Beg played a significant role in efforts to define and defend Yazidi communal identity during a period of rapid political transformation in the Middle East. He is noted for promoting education within the Yazidi community, for advocating recognition of the Yazidis as a distinct religious group, articulating one of the earliest modern formulations of Yazidi identity and for authoring the first published book on Yazidi history and religion.

== Early Life & Family ==
Ismail Chol Beg was born around 1888 or 1889 in the town of Baadre, northern Iraq, into the Yezidi princely family. He was the son of Mir Abdi Beg, who had briefly held the Yazidi emirate of Sheikhan after the death of his brother Mir Hussein Beg but was later imprisoned by the Ottoman authorities in 1875. Through his father, Ismail Chol Beg belonged to the hereditary line of Yazidi emirs of Sheikhan whose authority traditionally extended across Yazidi regions beyond Sheikhan.

He lost both of his parents at an early age, his father dying six months after his birth and his mother dying when he was three, leaving him an orphan who was raised by his sisters. Despite being closely related to the ruling branch of the princely family as a cousin of the Yazidi prince Ali Beg and the brother of his wife, Mayan Khatun, his early life was marked by considerable hardship. Despite these challenges, Ismail Chol Beg emerged as a determined and ambitious figure. Although he did not receive formal schooling and remained illiterate in the technical sense, he developed a strong interest in political affairs, religion, and the future of his community. Contemporary observers described him as forward-looking and unusually receptive to new ideas for a leader of his background. The Presbyterian missionary Roger Craig Cumberland wrote of him:

"The one bright spot on that landscape at present is Ismail Beg. He is a member of the Royal House of the Yezidis and as such he might be expected to be among the conservatives who oppose any change that would curtail the hereditary power of the rulers. On the contrary, he is one of the most forward-looking men in the whole country."

— Roger Craig Cumberland

From a young age, Ismail Chol Beg travelled extensively among Yazidi communities, including villages far beyond his place of birth. His early journeys, particularly his visit to Yazidis in the South Caucasus in 1908–1909, would later prove significant in shaping his political outlook and engagement with emerging nationalist currents.

=== Dispute within the Princely Family ===
Tensions within the Yazidi princely family emerged in part from Ismail Chol Beg's political activism. Following his visit to the Caucasus, Ismail Chol Beg travelled to Istanbul after the Young Turk coup of 1908, where he met with Ottoman Grand Vizier Hüseyin Hilmi Pasha. Acting without the authorisation of the reigning prince, Mir Ali Beg, he demanded the restitution of Yazidi temples and sacred standards (sanjaqs) confiscated by the Ottoman state following a military campaign in 1892. The Grand Vizier agreed, and the Lalish temple and the sanjaqs were returned to the Yazidis that same year, an outcome facilitated by the Young Turks' official rhetoric of freedom and equality. When news of Ismail's independent diplomatic success reached Mir Ali Beg, the prince grew alarmed that his cousin was positioning himself as a rival claimant to leadership. A dispute broke out within the princely family, and Ali Beg confiscated a portion of Ismail's property. Ismail subsequently filed a lawsuit in Mosul, demanding restitution of his property, that of his father Mir Abdi Beg, and a share in the revenues of the Lalish temple.

Following the death of Mir Ali Beg in 1913, the princely family agreed that Ali Beg's twelve-year-old son Said should succeed him, with his mother Mayan Khatun serving as regent. The dispute over property and succession rights continued under the British Mandate and into the Iraqi state period, but Ismail Chol Beg's claims went unresolved. Princely authority over the Yazidi community was ultimately consolidated within the line of Ali Beg; after Said Beg's death in 1944, his son Tahsin Beg succeeded him. Ismail Chol Beg's sons, including Bayezid and Muawiya, continued to press their father's claims during the Republican Era and took on significant political roles of their own.

== Educational Advocacy & Reform ==
Despite being illiterate himself, Ismail Chol Beg was a strong supporter of learning and communal reform. Already from an early stage in his public life, Ismail Chol Beg advocated the promotion of education within the Yazidi community at a time when literacy was limited and formal schooling was often viewed with suspicion due to long-standing religious taboos. His visit to Yezidi communities in the South Caucasus in 1908–1909 marked a turning point in his educational efforts. The journey took him first to Sinjar, then through the Tur Abdin region to Diyarbakır and Erzurum, before crossing into Russian-controlled territory.

The route through the Kurdish villages on the Turkey-Russia border was dangerous for Yazidis, as the local Kurdish population were described as fanatical Muslims deeply hostile towards Yazidis. To navigate this safely, Ismail posed as a dervish of the Qadiriyya order, a credible disguise, as the order's founder, Sheikh Abd al-Qadir al-Gilani, had been revered by Yazidis a close friend of Sheikh Adi. This earned him a warm welcome among Muslim Kurds living on the Russian-Turkish border.

The Muslim Kurdish villagers welcomed them as honoured guests and feasted in their homour. Ismail led the villagers in prayer; realizing that they knew little Arabic, he mixed into the ritual a number of curses and an appeal to Tawûsî Melek and Sheikh Adi to wipe out the entire tribe. Sick and disabled villagers came to receive his blessing; women seeking to end their barrenness brought cups of water for him to spit into; and the parents of a dying child requested soil from al-Gilani's shrine to tie to the child's wrist, which Ismail substituted with dust from Sheikh Adi's sanctuary. When the village elders asked whether it was permissible to kill Armenians and Yazidis, Ismail Beg pulled out his pocket diary, thumbed through the pages and declared that Sheikh Abd al-Qadir's book only justified killing in cases of self-defence or unprovoked aggression.

After several days of comparable receptions across successive villages, the travellers reached Alexandropol (present-day Gyumri, in north-western Armenia), where Ismail was no longer required to conceal his Yezidi identity. Having satisfied the Russian authorities of his peaceful intentions, he was permitted to travel among the Yazidi villages of the region.

During his visit, he raised concerns about the lack of education among Yezidis and sought support for the creation of schools. Plans were subsequently made to establish several schools for Yezidi children in the region under the responsibility of a person from Yerevan named Kabtikos, who was second-in-command to the Armenian Catholicos, Metios II Izmirlian.

In his discussions with the Catholicos, Ismail elaborated on his reasoning for setting aside this centuries-old prohibition on reading and writing. He argued that the ban had originally been instituted in regions under Muslim rule as a safeguard against forced conversion to Islam, but that no such threat existed within a Christian state; he therefore supported the establishment of schools for Yezidis in Russian Transcaucasia.

Ismail Beg Chol also issued a religious authorization permitting and encouraging literacy among Yazidis in Armenia, directly challenging the prevailing belief that reading and writing were religiously forbidden. In a letter addressed to Yazidi leaders, he emphasized the need to overcome ignorance and criticized the perception that Yezidis considered reading a sin:

We must ensure our development; we have endured enough, we have suffered enough through ignorance, and at least the peoples of the world should not revile us by saying that there are a people called the Yezidis who consider reading to be a sin – that is a disgrace for us.

Members of Ismail Chol Beg's family were associated with these educational developments. His eldest son became the first Yazidi schoolteacher in Baghdad, and his eldest daughter became the first Yazidi woman to receive a formal education. Ismail Chol Beg himself authored "The Yezidis, Past and Present", the first ever book on Yazidi history and religion to be published. He also encouraged that Yezidi religious tradition to embrace writing and literacy. Inspired by such efforts, many Yazidis began to pursue education and attend schools in Sinjar and Sheikhan districts, as well as the Bashiqa and Bahzani towns. As such, Ismail Beg is regarded as a significant figure who contributed to the advancement of Yazidi education in Iraq and other Yazidi-populated regions during the early twentieth century.

== Political activities ==
Ismail Chol Beg maintained contact with several nationalist and political movements during the early twentieth century, including Armenian, Assyrian, and Kurdish organizations, particularly during the period surrounding the collapse of the Ottoman Empire and the establishment of the British Mandate in Iraq.

=== Activities in the Southern Caucasus ===
During his visit to the South Caucasus in 1908–1909, Ismail Chol Beg came into contact with members of the Armenian Revolutionary Federation (Dashnaktsutyun). He made contact with a member of the Dashnak Committee and the Armenian Patriarch, reportedly felt deeply connected to the Armenians and appealed for a Yazidi-Armenian alliance. Rumors circulated in the Armenian press claiming that he intended to align the Yazidis with the Armenian Church, leading Ottoman authorities to arrest him together with several other Yazidis. The rumors were not substantiated and he was later released.

In February 1909, after leaving Armenia, Ismail Chol Beg travelled to Tbilisi, where he met with the Viceroy of the Caucasus, Illarion Vorontsov-Dashkov. In his memoirs, Ismail Chol Beg recounts a meeting convened by the viceroy, during which Ismail introduced himself as the leader, prince and sheikh of Yazidis. The viceroy admitted limited knowledge of the Yazidis and had previously assumed their beliefs were similar to those of Islam and Kurds before recognizing the distinctiveness of Yazidi doctrine. He reported submitting a memorandum in Russian expressing hope that Russian forces might protect the Yazidis of Sinjar from recurring attacks.

After arriving in Armenia, Ismail Chol Beg was warmly received by local Yazidi communities and encouraged greater educational participation. Observing that literacy levels were low, he urged families to send their children to school and issued a religious decree permitting and encouraging reading, writing, and formal learning. Local Yazidis also informed him that no Yazidi Mîr had visited them since the Battle of Kars, and that they had thus become unfamiliar with certain religious customs and laws. In response, Ismail explained the specific purpose of his visit; he had heard that they were deviating from the principles and teachings of the Yazidi faith. He subsequently convened a large gathering of the Yezidis in the area, at which he delivered a sermon outlining dozens of core tenets of Yazidi belief, moral teachings, religious duties, as well as distinctions between what is permitted and forbidden in Yazidism.

He further proposed administrative reforms, urging the community to organise their religious structure through the appointment of a sheikh or peshimam for every five villages to oversee religious affairs and facilitate relations with local authorities. A written version of these guidelines was reportedly submitted to local officials, who accepted the document and recognized “Yazidi religion” as the formal religious designation in administrative records. Although he was briefly questioned by local authorities on suspicion of organizing secret societies, he denied the accusation and clarified that his purpose was to advise the Yazidi community and help organise their affairs in order to facilitate official dealings with the government; he was subsequently released.

In the Yazidi villages around Yerevan, concerns were raised about disunity and fragmentation within the community. Ismail Chol Beg visited the senior clerical authority of the Armenian Church in Etchmiadzin and requested protection for Yazidis residing in the districts of Gyumri, Kars, and Erivan, emphasizing the preservation of their religious identity. The Armenian Patriarch agreed to provide protection, and a formal document was prepared and signed by Yazidi leaders. The document recorded 72 Yazidi villages comprising approximately 350 households. The Patriarch also supported the establishment of schools, and Yazidi leaders affirmed that the emir had already issued a decree permitting education.

Correspondence from this period shows that Ismail Chol Beg signed at least one letter as “Sheikh Ismail Chol Beg of the Yezidi Nation.” Several of his seals appear on surviving documents. One seal, written in Arabic and Latin script, reads “Ameer Ismael, Rais Mulat al-Yezidia” (“Emir Ismail, Chief of the Yezidi Nation”), while another reads “Emir Sheikh Ismail Beg, Chief of the Yazidis.”

In letters describing the historical persecution of the Yazidis, he named specific Ottoman-era figures, including Dawud Pasha and the Muslim Kurdish prince Mohammed Pasha of Rawanduz (Kor Pasha), whom he associated with earlier campaigns against Yazidi communities. In this context, he wrote that “from that day on, our people were exterminated.” His letters from this period consistently described the Yazidis as a distinct nation with their own history, leadership, and collective experience.

After leaving the Caucasus, Ismail Chol Beg travelled via Batumi and Istanbul before returning to Iraq. Internal rivalries within the Yazidi princely family, particularly with Said Beg, prevented him from securing unified leadership of all Yazidis. He instead settled in Sinjar, where he gained significant support among local tribes, who acknowledged him as their Mir.

In 1919, after the independence of Georgia, the Yazidis founded the first officially state-recognised Yazidi organisation, named "National Council of Yazidis" and recognized by the Georgian government. It was founded at the suggestion of Ismail Chol Beg and the constituent general assembly in July 1919 was convened in his name. Around this period, approximately a decade after his 1908–1909 visit to the South Caucasus, Ismail Chol Beg maintained correspondence with Yazidi leaders in the region. A document issued at the time records:

A general assembly of the Yezidis was held in the community shelter in Ortachala to discuss their fate and to organise a special national council to liaise with the Armenian National Council in order to develop mutual peaceful activities for the common good.

In the same year, Ismail Chol Beg sent several letters in Armenian to Yazidi leaders in Armenia, bearing the seals of multiple Yazidi representatives. In these letters, he described the Yazidi struggles in Sinjar against the Ottoman, noting "they [the Turks have destroyed our nation", as well as their situation, and their role in sheltering and rescuing a large number of Armenian refugees during the First World War, adding that "the Armenians spoke words of praise about the Yazidi nation".

=== Assyrian nationalist contacts ===
From the 1920s onward, Ismail Chol Beg developed a close relationship with Assyrian nationalist figures, including the military commander Agha Petros and the British-Chaldean activist Hormuzd Rassam. Together with influential Yazidi leaders from Sinjar, including Hamo Sharo, he supported efforts to establish an Assyrian autonomous region or state in the Mosul province that would include Yazidi territories. He consistently maintained the view that the Yazidis were of ancient Assyrian origin. The project ultimately failed due to opposition from the British Mandate authorities.

=== Contact with Kurdish nationalism ===
From 1928 onward, Ismail Chol Beg came into contact with the Kurdish nationalist organisation Khoybun, and corresponded with its leading figures, the brothers Jeladet and Kamuran Bedirkhan. Scholars have noted that his engagement with Khoybun appears to have been largely pragmatic, motivated by the desire to strengthen his position in an ongoing rivalry with his nephew Said Beg rather than genuine Kurdish nationalist sympathy. Although in a Khoybun correspondence he described himself as a Kurd, in his other writings and statements, he consistently distinguished the Yazidis from Kurds and regarded them as a separate people. A founding member of Khoybun who visited Sinjar reported: "I did not observe any [Kurdish] national consciousness among the Yezidis." In 1932, when questioned by the League of Nations Boundary Commission, Ismail Chol Beg acknowledged friendly relations with Kurds but differentiated the two groups, stating that Kurds who had converted to Islam were historically distinct from the Yazidis.

=== Under the British Mandate ===
After the British conquest of Mosul in 1918, Yazidi leaders in Sinjar drafted a declaration, signed by more than fifty prominent figures including Ismail Chol Beg, stating their desire to live under British rule. The declaration was signed by Ismail Chol Beg in his capacity as secular leader of the Yazidis. At the end of 1918, British Political Officer Colonel G. Leachman issued a formal decree recognising Ismail Chol Beg as Emir of the Yazidis, designating him Mîrê Mîran ("Prince of Princes"). The decree read in part:

WHEREAS Great Britain has recognised, and acknowledges the Amir Miran Ismail Beg bin Abdi as the Amir of the Yezidis Nation, we have given him this Firman [Decree] for the information of his tribes.

Leachman offered Ismail Chol Beg the position of deputy political governor of Sinjar, which he declined, recommending Hamo Sharo for the post instead. He requested instead the restoration of his hereditary rights within the Yazidi emirate, including revenues from and custodianship over the Lalish Temple and other sacred shrines.

=== National Council of Yazidis in Georgia ===
In 1919, following Georgian independence, Yazidis in Georgia founded the first officially state-recognised Yazidi organisation, the "National Council of Yazidis," approved by the Georgian government. The organisation was founded on the initiative of Ismail Chol Beg, and its constituent general assembly was convened in his name. A document from the assembly records its aim as organising a council to liaise with the Armenian National Council "in order to develop mutual peaceful activities for the common good."

== The Yezidis, Past and Present ==
Ismail Chol Beg's principal published work, Al-Yezidiyya: qadiman wa hadithan (The Yezidis, Past and Present), was published in 1934 as part of the American University of Beirut's Oriental Series, under the Faculty of Arts and Sciences, edited by Constantin Zureiq (Costi K. Zurayk). It is considered the first published book on Yezidi history and religion authored by a Yezidi.

The 134-page work was dictated by Ismail Chol Beg to a scribe, as he was illiterate, a fact confirmed by his daughter Wansa in an interview with the editor Zurayk. The work comprises three primary sections. The first is an autobiography in which Ismail Chol Beg recounts his travels, political activities, and the hardships he endured on behalf of the Yazidi community; it is written in a style rich with colloquial Iraqi Arabic vocabulary. The second section addresses Yazidi beliefs, customs, traditions, and religious holidays, presented in a more formal and refined Arabic register than the first. The third section provides a historical account of the Sinjar region, including the tribal composition and genealogies of Yazidi communities, and documents episodes of genocide, persecution, and forced displacement carried out by Ottoman authorities, particularly the account of Suleiman Pasha, who offered the Yezidis guarantees of safety before ordering their massacre and the captivity of their women and children.

The work was reviewed in the 1936 Journal of the Royal Asiatic Society by Heyworth Dunne, who recognised it as a significant contribution to Yazidi studies, praising its use of primary sources and firsthand accounts of historic events. Ali and Al Omar describe it as an essential resource for understanding Yazidi history, religion, and identity, offering scholars narratives grounded in a Yazidi voice, a community that had frequently been misrepresented in both Western and Middle Eastern scholarship.

== Death & Legacy ==
Ismail Chol Beg died in 1933. His ideas were carried forward by his children, several of whom became active in defining and promoting Yazidi identity. His son Yezidkhan Beg published writings on Yazidi identity using his father's framework. His son Bayezid Beg founded the first Yazidi political movement in Baghdad. His daughter Wansa became an important figure in Yazidi cultural life advocating Yazidi autonomy.

== See also ==
- List of Yazidi people
- Mir Ali Beg I of Sheikhan
