= Mir Ali Beg I of Sheikhan =

Yazidi prince of Sheikhan in the early 19th century

Mir Ali Beg I
- Mir of Sheikhan principality
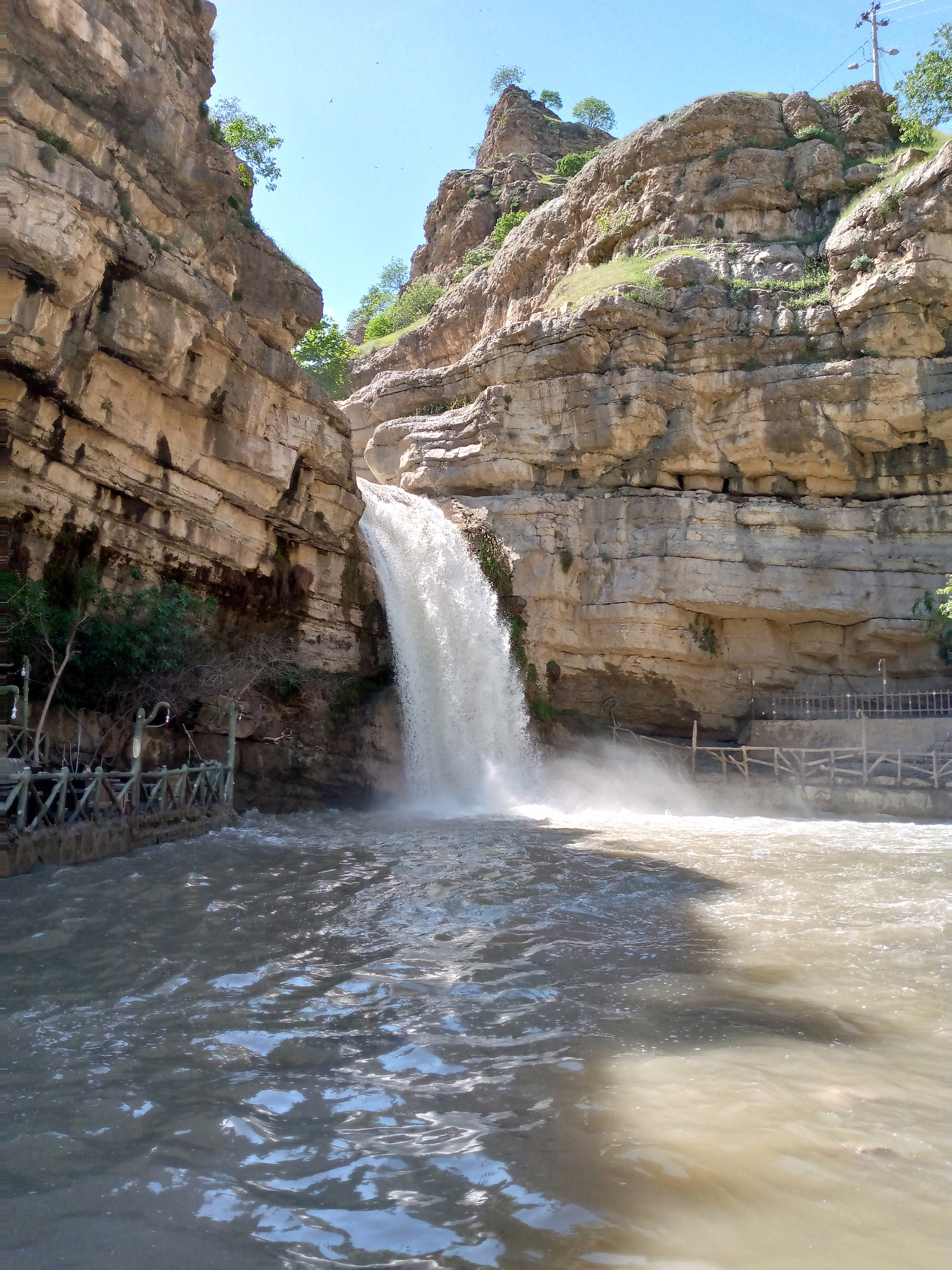
- Geli Ali Beg Waterfall, named after Mîr Elî Beg who was executed by Mir Muhammad of Rawanduz at this valley for refusing to convert to Islam
- Reign: 1809 – 1833
- Predecessor: Hasan Beg
- Died: 1833; Geliyê Elî Beg
- Burial: Village of Zînava Mîrî, Shekhan district
- Issue: Mir Hussein Beg
- Native name: Mîr Elî Begê Mezin
- Dynasty: Sheikhan
- Father: Hasan Beg
- Religion: Yazidism

Mir Ali Beg I, also known as Mîr Elî Begê Mezin ("Mir Ali Beg the Great"), was a Yazidi prince (mir) of Sheikhan who ruled in the early 19th century. He was captured during the genocide of Yazidis by Soran emirate and executed at Geli Ali Beg waterfall after refusing to convert to Islam.

== Reign ==
Ali Beg was the son of Mir Hasan Beg, ruler of the principality of Sheikhan. By his time the principality had shrunk to a few districts inhabited by Yazidis, stretching from Dohuk to Harir and from Mosul to the Shingal mountains. Its administrative centre and the ruler's residence was the settlement of Baadre.

Under Hasan Beg, the Sheikhan principality entered a period of relative prosperity. In 1806 he oversaw the rebuilding of the Lalish sanctuary, consolidating its role as the central pilgrimage site of the Yazidi community. His reign ended with his treacherous murder at the hands of a prince of Amadiya, an event that left a lasting impression on Yazidi collective memory. In 1820, the travellers Claudius James Rich and his wife Mary Rich, spending a night at a Yazidi village, heard a lament for the slain Mir performed by a blind guitarist named Lasso. Approximately fifty years after his death, a German orientalist transcribed a poem commemorating a battle between two Bahdinan princes in which warriors from Sheikhan and Dennedi tribe avenged Hasan Beg's killing.

Hasan Beg was succeeded as Mir by Salih Beg, who was regarded with considerable respect by the Yazidi community but was murdered by an adversary in Mosul. His death initiated a prolonged period of dynastic instability and internal strife within the principality. Order was eventually restored with the accession of Ali Beg, who reunited the princely line.

Sheikhan was semi-independent but a vassal of the emir of Amedi in the Bahdinan emirate, which protected the Yazidis from hostile neighbouring Kurdish tribes. Both the Kurdish emirates and Sheikhan formed part of the Ottoman Empire. After inheriting the throne, Ali Beg built close ties with neighbouring Kurdish princes and became politically active in the region.

The British traveller Austen Henry Layard, who met Ali Beg's son Hussein Beg in 1846, describes Mir Ali Beg as popular, brave and capable enough to defend his people against the neighboring Muslims and Kurds for many years, reporting:

"The last independent chief of the Yezidis of Sheikhan was Ali Bey, the father of Hussein Bey. He was beloved by his tribe, and sufficiently brave and skilful in war to defend them, for many years, against the attacks of the Kurds and Mussulmans of the plain. The powerful Bey of Rowandiz, who had united most of the Kurdish tribes of the surrounding mountains under his banner, and long defied both Turks and Persians, resolved to crush the hateful sect of the Yezidis. Ali Bey's forces were greatly inferior in numbers to those of his persecutor. He was defeated, and fell into the hands of the Rowandiz chief, who put him to death."

== Conflict with Soran ==
=== Killing of Ali Agha Balatayyi ===
The Yazidis of Sheikhan had long-standing hostilities with the Mizuri, a powerful Sunni Kurdish tribe based in Sheikhan that repeatedly interfered in the affairs of Bahdinan. Mizuri clerics issued fatwas against the Yazidis, and in 1802 the Algushiyya clan of the Mizuri attacked the Yazidi village of Ghabara, killed about a hundred people and occupied Lalish for eight months.

After the death of the Bahdinan prince Zubayr Pasha in 1824, Bahdinan was in conflict with its own tribal leaders, and some of its princes sought allies among the Yazidis against the Mizuri. The Mizuri had also come into conflict with the emirs of Bahdinan earlier, and in 1804 Mizuri forces entered Amedi, seized the emir's family and plundered the town, until Yazidis of the Dinan tribe came at the request of the Bahdinan emir Ahmed Pasha and drove them out.

Muhammad Said Pasha of Bahdinan wanted to curb the power of the Mizuri leader Ali Agha Balatayyi and asked Ali Beg for help. Ali Beg agreed to kill Balatayyi only after being assured that the Yazidis would be protected from reprisals. According to one account, Said Pasha also threatened to destroy Ali Beg's family if he refused. The Mizuri used to attack Yazidi villages in Sheikhan and take taxes from them by force, which was one reason for Ali Beg's agreement to the Bahdinan prince's plan.

Said Pasha arranged a reconciliation between the two men, with his brother Ismail, the governor of Akre, as mediator. Ali Beg visited Balatayyi in his village of Balata and invited him in return to Baadre. In 1832, on the way there, Balatayyi and his son were ambushed and killed by Ali Beg; two of Balatayyi's bodyguards took part in the plot. The killing violated Yazidi canons and tribal custom, and was condemned by Yazidi clergy and the heads of Yazidi tribes.

=== Soran invasion ===
Balatayyi's nephew, the cleric Mulla Yahya Mizuri, took on the task of avenging him. He first asked the Bahdinan prince for help and returned empty-handed, then went to Muhammad Pasha, emir of Soran, and asked him to take revenge on the Yazidis and the Bahdinan prince. Pirbari adds that Said Pasha and Ismail killed Mulla Yahya's son when he appealed to them. Muhammad Pasha was by then the most powerful ruler in Kurdistan, minting his own coinage and claiming independence from the Ottomans, whose sultan was occupied with the revolt of Muhammad Ali Pasha in Egypt. He had annexed several neighbouring principalities and in 1815 had executed two of his uncles and their sons to remove rival claimants to the throne.

A fatwa sanctioning the killing of Yazidis and the seizure of their property was issued after Muhammad Pasha requested it from his mufti, Mulla Muhammad Khatt-i

Muhammad Pasha assembled between 40,000 and 50,000 fighters, divided into two columns under his brother Rasul Beg and himself. In early March 1832 they crossed the Great Zab and destroyed the Yazidi village of Kallak, then moved on Sheikhan, taking Khatara and Alqosh. A joint Yazidi and Bahdinan force under Yusuf Abdo of Amedi and Baba Hurmuz, head of the monastery at Alqosh, withdrew towards Baadre. Ali Beg wished to negotiate, but Muhammad Pasha, influenced by Mulla Yahya and Mulla Khatt-i, refused. Musa Beg, brother of the Bahdinan emir, sided with the Soran emir against his brother.

The Soran army defeated the Yazidis at Sheikhan despite Bahdinan assistance. Men and older boys who were captured were killed, and women and children were enslaved. Yazidi villages around Alqosh, Sheikhan, Dohuk, Bashiqa, Bahzani, Khatara and Kalak were destroyed. According to Abd al-Fattah al-Botani, Muhammad Pasha lost an eye in the fighting and became known as Mira Kora ("the Blind Emir").

Many Yazidis fled towards Mosul. The nineteenth-century traveller Austen Henry Layard reports that the river was in flood and the bridge of boats had been removed, so that many were trapped on the east bank and killed on the mound of Kuyunjik while the people of Mosul watched. The Soran army then plundered the temple at Lalish, and Yazidi women and children who hid in a cave beneath it suffocated when soldiers lit a fire at the entrance.

Sinjari Yazidis resisted under the leadership of Ali Beg's wife. Soran forces then moved against Sinjar, which they took in 1834 after facing several defeats. Khelani reports that after the Bahdinan campaign the Yazidis burned thirty Soran soldiers stationed in their territory, together with their officer, which forced Muhammad Pasha to campaign against them again.

Many Yazidis also fled to the Tur Abdin and Hakkari mountains, some went to Syria, and others dispersed elsewhere. The Ottoman sultan subsequently sent a large army against the Soran emir, ending his independence.

== Death and Legacy ==
Soran forces took about 10,000 prisoners, mostly women and children, together with Ali Beg to Rawanduz, the Soran capital Soran troops captured Ali Beg at Sheikhan, bound him and took him to Muhammad Pasha, who demanded that the Yazidis convert to Islam. Ali Beg refused. He and those who would not convert were executed in a gorge near Erbil, afterwards known as Geliyê Elî Beg ("Ali Beg's gorge").

Several accounts agree that Ali Beg was executed due to his refusal to convert to Islam. Vladimir Minorsky reports that he was executed after refusing to become a Muslim. The Kurdish historian Mukriyani, relaying what elders in Rawanduz told him, describes Ali Beg as brave, handsome and upright, and says that Muhammad Pasha, urged on by the clergy, demanded that he convert. The account of Khelani, as reported by Nebez, says the emir admired him and asked him three times to convert, and that Ali Beg refused each time. These accounts are also echoed in a Kurdish folk song.

In the immediate aftermath of the Rawanduzi invasion, Ali Beg's young son Hussein Beg was taken into hiding in the Sinjar. Hussein Beg was subsequently elected Mir under the tutelage of Sheikh Nasr, the Baba Sheikh, who resided at Esiyan.

Ali Beg's body was later retrieved from Soran region by his brother and successor Mir Suleiman Beg, who buried him on Şêxûbekir hill in the village of Zînawa (Zînava Mîrî) near Şêxûbekir shrine, where it continued to be visited by villagers during feasts and special occasions. Ali Beg's descendants are found in the town of Baadre.

A palace named after Ali Beg, built after the family moved away from the village of Esiya in 1809, stood until 2000, when it was demolished by one of his descendants, who built a modern house in its place.

Ali Beg remains a contested figure in Yazidi history. His killing of Balatayyi precipitated the massacre of the Yazidis, but he is also regarded as a martyr for refusing to renounce his faith.

== See also ==
- List of Yazidi people
- Mir Ismail Chol Beg
- Meyan Khatun
- Forced conversion to Islam

== Sources ==
- Pirbari, Dimitri (April 2012). "Езидский правитель мира Али-Бег I" [Yazidi ruler of the world Ali-Beg I] (PDF). Novy Vzglyad (in Russian). No. 4 (9). p. 6.
- Hassan Ali, Majid (2019). "Genocidal Campaigns during the Ottoman Era: The Firmān of Mīr-i-Kura against the Yazidi Religious Minority in 1832–1834". Genocide Studies International. 13 (1): 77–91. doi:10.3138/gsi.13.1.05.
- Guest, John S. (2023-01-27). The Yezidis: A Study in Survival. Taylor & Francis. ISBN 978-1-000-81750-8.
- Mirza, Hassan Khero (2020). The Yazidis in Iraq and the Neighbouring Countries: A Historical Field Study in Religious, Cultural and Social Life (PhD thesis) (in Arabic). Supervised by Majid Hassan Ali. St Clements University, Duhok office.
- Nebez, Jemal (1970). Der kurdische Fürst Mīr Muḥammad-ī Rawandīzī genannt Mīr-i Kōra im Spiegel der morgenländischen und abendländischen Zeugnisse: Ein Beitrag zur kurdischen Geschichte (Dr. phil. dissertation) (in German). Universität Hamburg.
