= Baadre =

- Town
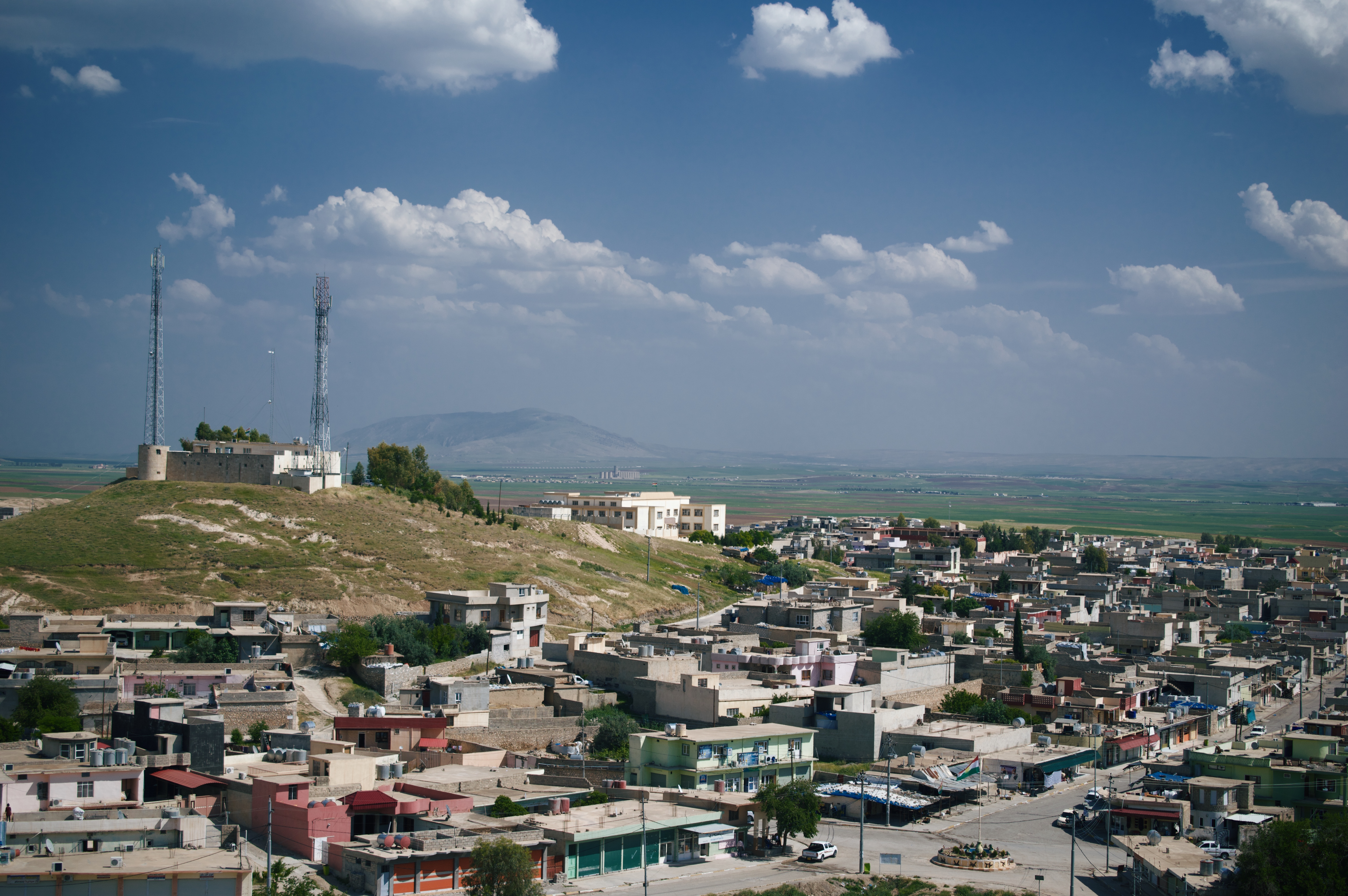

- Location in Iraq Baadre (Iraqi Kurdistan)
- Coordinates: 36°43′05″N 43°15′15″E
- Country: Iraq
- Federal Region: Kurdistan Region
- Governorate: Dohuk Governorate
- District: Shekhan District

Baadre (Kurdish: باعەدرێ, romanized: Baedrê; Syriac: Beṯ ʿEḏraï) (Note: Alternatively transliterated as Bā ʿAdhra, Bāʿdrē, Bā ʿAdre, Beth Edre, Beth ʿEdray, or Beth ʿEdraye.) is a town located in the Shekhan District of the Nineveh Governorate, Kurdistan Region, Iraq. It is located in the Nineveh Plains. It belongs to the disputed territories of Northern Iraq. In 2014, the urban population was 9835 and the rural population was 5167.

It is mostly inhabited by Yazidis and it is considered the political capital of the Yazidis as it is the historical seat of the ruling dynasty of the Sheikhan principality and the Mir. The castle of the princely family is found here.

== History ==
Beṯ ʿEḏraï (today called Baadre) was historically inhabited by Church of the East Christians. A synod was hosted at Beṯ ʿEḏraï in August-September 485 AD. It was conquered by Utba ibn Farqad al-Sulamī during the Arab conquest of Mesopotamia in 641, according to Futuh al-Buldan by the 9th-century historian Al-Baladhuri. Al-Baladhuri noted that the district of Bā ʿAdhra had a Kurdish population. A school was established in the village by the 8th-century reformer Rabban Babāï.

In the 9th century, the village is attested as part of the Church of the East diocese of Margā as per Thomas of Marga's Book of Governors, in which it is mentioned that one resident had practised sun worship prior to converting to Christianity. The father of Patriarch Abraham II of Seleucia-Ctesiphon (r. 837–850) was from Beṯ ʿEḏraï. The monk Joseph Busnaya (d. 979) was born at Beṯ ʿEḏraï. Beṯ ʿEḏraï likely ceased to be Christian during the thirteenth or fourteenth centuries, at which time a Yazidi community was established.

In Ba'athist Iraq, the population of Baadre was deported because of their support for Peshmerga. According to Shamal Adeeb, who was the town's mayor at the time, the town and the 10 villages in the vicinity took in 2,028 displaced families totaling 12,115 people fleeing the Sinjar massacre in 2014.

== Bibliography ==
- Ahmad b. Yahya al-Baladhuri (2022). History of the Arab Invasions: The Conquest of the Lands: A New Translation of al-Baladhuri's Futuh al-Buldan. Translated by Hugh Kennedy.
- Allison, Christine (20 July 2004). "Yazidis i: General". Encyclopædia Iranica.
- Brock, Sebastian P. (2011). "Yawsep Busnaya". In Sebastian P. Brock; Aaron M. Butts; George A. Kiraz; Lucas Van Rompay (eds.). Gorgias Encyclopedic Dictionary of the Syriac Heritage. Gorgias Press. pp. 436–437.
- Minorsky, V. (1986). "Kurds, Kurdistān". In P. Bearman; Th. Bianquis; C. E. Bosworth; E. Donzel; W. P. Heinrichs (eds.). Encyclopaedia of Islam. Vol. 5 (2nd ed.). pp. 447–64.
- Spät, Eszter (2018). "Yezidi Identity Politics and Political Ambitions in the Wake of the ISIS Attack". Journal of Balkan and Near Eastern Studies. 20 (5): 420–438. doi:10.1080/19448953.2018.1406689. S2CID 148897618.
- Van Rompay, Lucas (2011). "Aqaq". In Sebastian P. Brock; Aaron M. Butts; George A. Kiraz; Lucas Van Rompay (eds.). Gorgias Encyclopedic Dictionary of the Syriac Heritage. Gorgias Press. p. 27.
- Wallis Budge, E.A. (1893). The Book of Governors: The Historia Monastica of Thomas of Marga AD 840. Vol. 2.
- Wilmshurst, David (2000). The Ecclesiastical Organisation of the Church of the East, 1318–1913 (PDF). Peeters Publishers.
