= Eski Mosul =

Populated place in Iraq

Eski Mosul أسكي موصل
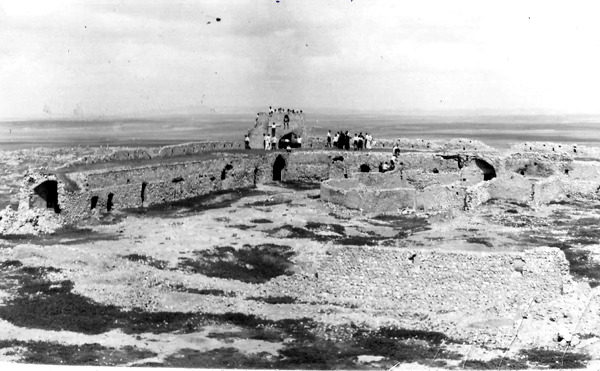
- Ruins at Eski Mosul

- Location within Iraq
- Coordinates: 36.514°N 42.735°E
- Country: Iraq
- Governorate: Ninawa
- District: Mosul
- Subdistrict: al-Muhamadath

Eski Mosul (Arabic: أسكي موصل) is a village in Mosul District, in present-day northern Iraq. Located just downstream from the Mosul Dam, Eski Mosul is the site of the ancient and medieval city of Balad.

== Name ==
The name "Eski Mosul" means "Old Mosul" in Turkish.

Eski Mosul is the site of ancient and medieval Balad, which was known as Balaṭ in Akkadian and either Balad or Balaṭ in Syriac and medieval Arabic.

According to Yaqut al-Hamawi, Balad was known as Shahrābādh in Sasanian times. (He also mentioned that the name Balad was often written Balaṭ, as mentioned above.)

== Geography ==
Eski Mosul is located about 40 km northwest of Mosul, near the west bank of the Tigris. It is located on a smaller stream called the Wadi al-Murr, just above its confluence with the Tigris. It is located opposite from the village of Wanah.

Administratively, Eski Mosul is in the al-Muhamadath subdistrict of Mosul District in Ninawa Governorate.

== History ==
The village of Eski Mosul is located atop a prehistoric mound, over 100 feet tall. This is the site of ancient and medieval Balad, although the site is much older — archaeological finds here date back as far as the Bronze Age Painted Pottery culture. Ancient Balad is first attested in the inscriptions of the Assyrian king Sennacherib (c. 700 BCE). It later became a Christian diocese of the East Syriac Rite, first attested in 497 CE. The Syrian Orthodox bishop of Beth Arabaye was also based at Balad.

The 10th-century geographers Ibn Hawqal and al-Muqaddasi both left descriptions of Balad in their works. Ibn Hawqal described it as a large city, while al-Muqaddasi wrote that Balad had well-built stone houses, good markets, and a congregational mosque at the center of town. Gerald Reitlinger suggested a possible identification of this mosque with "a fragment of wall built of fine squared granite blocks" on the western side of the mound at Eski Mosul. Reitlinger identified this fragment as part of a monumental iwan, with a Kufic inscription on it. He wrote that the exposed part of the inscription, at the bottom right corner, consisted of the basmala.

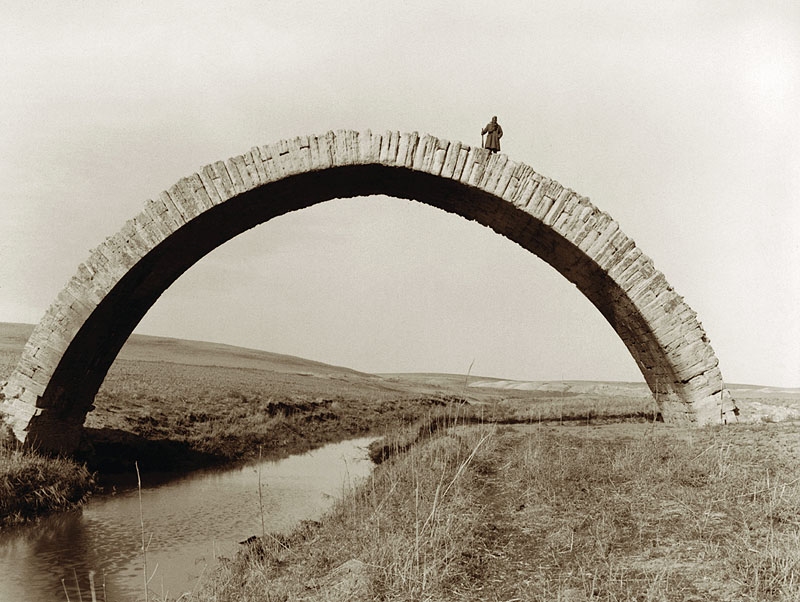
Remains of Jisr Eski Mosul, a medieval bridge west of Eski Mosul

The 13th-century writer Yaqut al-Hamawi repeated some of al-Muqaddasi's observations and also described Balad as a crossroads between Mosul, Nisibin, and Sinjar. The remains of two bridges, at Kisik Kuprü and Jisr Eski Mosul, mark the old routes. Jisr Eski Mosul, a monumental stone bridge on the Wadi al-Murr two miles west of Eski Mosul, is disproportionately large for the small stream it crosses. Only the middle part of the bridge survives; the access ramps were removed at some point before the 20th century. An inscription identifies the bridge as having been built in 1213-14 (611 AH) — during Yaqut's lifetime — by an architect named Muḥammad al-Ḥuzrī. This bridge would have connected medieval Balad with Faysh Khabur and Jazīrat Ibn 'Umar (present-day Cizre). As for the bridge at Kisik Kuprü, it probably dates from the early Islamic period and was rebuilt at a later date — likely also around the 1200s, under the Zengids, who built several bridges in Upper Mesopotamia (including Jisr Eski Mosul). Kisik Kuprü would have carried the route from Balad to Tall A'far and then on to Nisibin.

At some unknown point after Yaqut's lifetime, Balad became abandoned. Afram Barsoum suggested a 14th century date for Balad's abandonment because the last Syriac Orthodox bishop of Beth Arbaye (early 1300s) was called the "bishop of Sinjar" instead.

Sometime after Balad's abandonment, a fortified khan was built on top of the old mound. With curtain walls replacing some of the rooms on one side, the khan was effectively a small fortress; locals referred to it as "the qasr" instead of "the khan". The modern village of Eski Mosul was built within the walls of the qasr/khan. By the early 1900s, though, there were only a few houses still within the walls — most of the local families had built new homes outside the walls, and the khan was mainly used to shelter livestock instead of as a fortification.

In the 1980s, the Mosul Dam was built on the Tigris just upstream from Eski Mosul. The dam was originally called the Eski Mosul Dam, but later became known as just the Mosul Dam.
