= Bahdinan =

Former Kurdish Principality

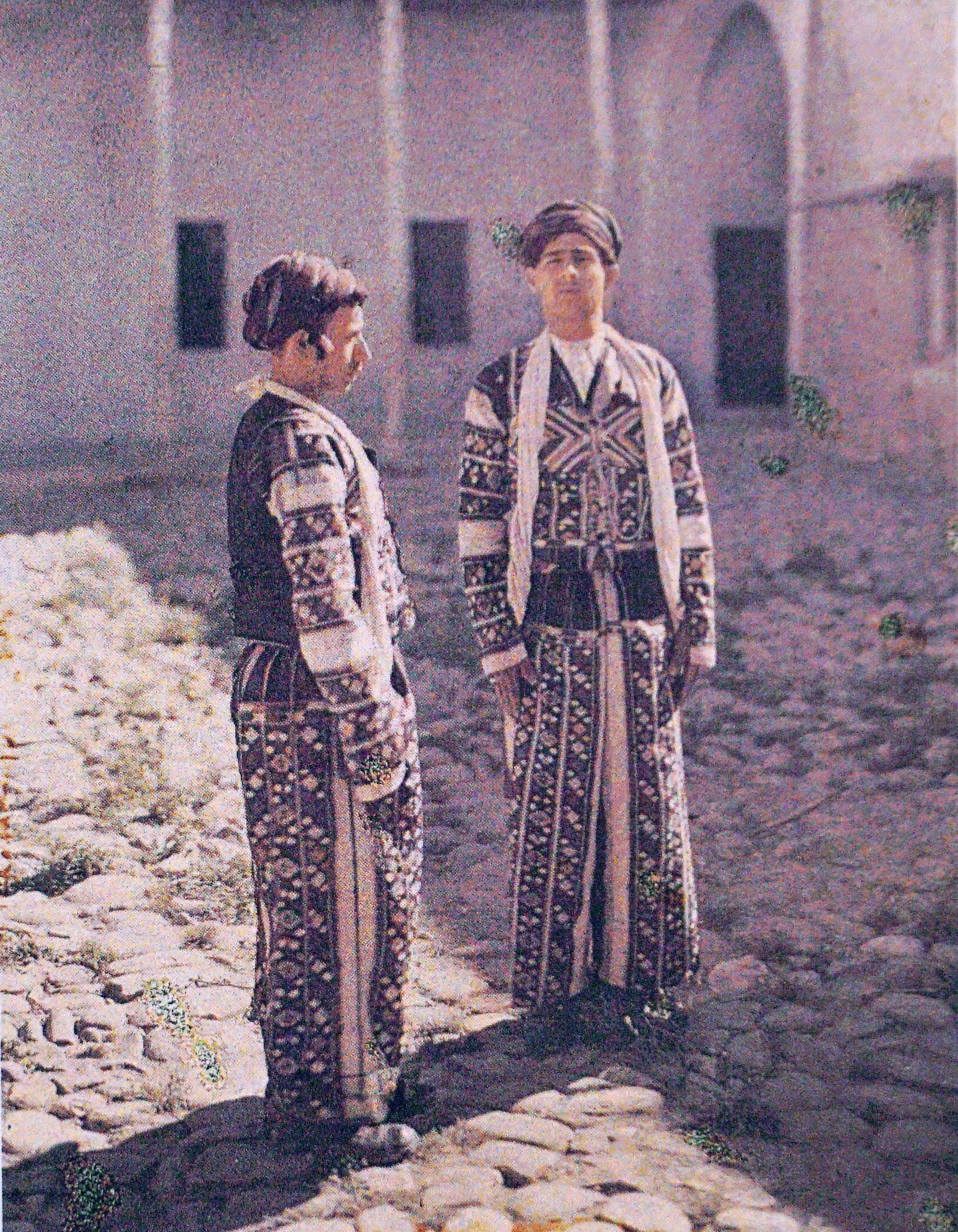
Bahdinan Kurds by Albert Kahn

The Bahdinan (or Badinan) was one of the most powerful and enduring Kurdish emirates. It was founded by Baha-al-Din originally from Shamdinan area in Hakkari in sometime between 13th or 14th century CE. The capital of this emirate was Amedi for a long time. The Emirs of Bahdinan claimed descent from the Abbasid Caliphs, though according to Yazidi tradition they descended from Amadin, a Yazidi saint.

== Origins ==
According to Yazidi tradition, the ruling dynasty of Bahdinan originally descended from the Yazidi sheikh lineage of Amadin, a saint in Yazidism. The population of the emirate was predominantly Yazidi not long before the sixteenth century.

The rulers of the Bahdinan Emirate, based in Amadiya, claimed Arab descent from Abbasid caliphs. In Sharafnama, Sharaf Khan Bidlisi records that the rulers of Amadiya themselves claimed direct lineage to the Abbasid caliphs, and that they built schools and mosques in the city and promoted learning. He lists seven of these Abbasid rulers in detail and notes that the fortresses of Dair and Dohuk were administered by other Abbasid relatives. The late historian Muhammad Amin Zaki states that this family's rule lasted until 1292 AH (1871 CE), the total number of Abbasid rulers of Bahdinan may have exceeded fifteen.

== Geographical extent ==
Bahdinan generally consisted of the region north and northeast of the Mosul plain. Its capital was the town of Amadiya (Amêdî), and it also included Akre, Shush, and Duhok, along with the Zebari lands along the Great Zab river.. The principality of Bahdinan sometimes also extended to include Zakho in the west. To the north, Bahdinan bordered the principalities of Bohtan and Hakkâri, and to the south it bordered the principality of Soran.

The name "Bahdinan" is still applied to the region inhabited by the Barwari, Doski, Gulli, Muzuri, Raykani, Silayvani, Sindi, and Zebari tribes.

According to Evliya Celebi the principality was divided into the following districts: Aqra, Zakho, Shikhoyi, Duhok, Zibari, and Muzuri.

The districts were autonomous units under their own rulers who were appointed by the Khan of Amadiya. In addition to this, there were tribal chieftains with formalized positions (for example, the chiefs of the Sindi and Silvane tribes needed confirmation from the ruler of Zakho).

== History ==
The Bahdinan principality originated during the late Abbasid period, sometime around 1200. During its formation, it was largely dominated by the Kurdish Hakkariyya tribe. The Sharafnama of Sharaf al-Din Bitlisi contains an account of the principality's history for two centuries, from the time of the Timurid ruler Shah Rukh in the 1400s until 1596. The Bahdinan amir Hasan, who was a client of the Safavid shah Isma'il I, expanded the principality to include Duhok and the Sindi territory north of Zakho. Hasan's son Husayn later reigned as a client of the Ottoman sultan Suleiman the Magnificent. Husayn's son Qubād was deposed and killed by members of the Muzuri tribe; Qubād's son, Saydī Khān, was later reinstalled with Ottoman help. In the early 1600s, the principality of Ardalan captured the Bahdinan capital of Amadiya and appointed a governor there; sources say little about Bahdinan for a century afterward.

The principality seems to have reached its peak during the reign of Bahrām Pasha, who ruled from 1726 to 1767. Bahrām was succeeded by his son Ismā'īl Pasha (r. 1767–1797), whose reign involved conflict with his brothers (who were variously based at Zakho and Akre). Ismā'īl's son Murād Khān was deposed by his cousin Qubād with the assistance of the Baban pasha of Sulaymaniyah; Qubād was overthrown by members of the Muzuri tribe in 1804 (just like his earlier namesake). He was replaced by 'Ādil Pasha, whose position was affirmed by the Jalili pasha of Mosul; he died in 1808 and was succeeded by his brother Zubayr.

In 1833, Mir Muhammad of the Soran Emirate captured Akre and Amadiya, overthrew Sā'īd Pasha of Bahdinan, and went on to capture Zakho. The Bahdinan principality never fully recovered, and it was annexed into the Ottoman Sanjak of Mosul in 1838.

Threatened by the expansionist and centralizing efforts of the Ottoman and Safavid empires, Bahdinan princes were drawn into prolonged confrontations with these two major rival powers. The Bahdinan rulers, Ismail Pasha and Muhammad Said Pasha were deposed by Mir Muhammad in 1831.

The most famous ancient library in the region, in the Qubehan school at Amadiya, was destroyed by British troops putting down a revolt in the region in 1919, although some 400 manuscripts were rescued and eventually found their way into the Iraq Museum's collection.

== See also ==
- List of Kurdish dynasties and countries
