= Sanjak of Mosul =

Sanjak of Mosul موصل سنجاغى Musul Sancağı
- Sanjak of the Ottoman Empire
- 1516–1869
- Capital: Mosul
- History
  - Established: 1516
  - Disestablished: 1869
Preceded by	Succeeded by
Safavid Empire	Baghdad Vilayet
- Today part of: Iraq

The Sanjak of Mosul or Mosul Sanjak (Ottoman Turkish: موصل سنجاغى Musul Sancağı) was a sanjak in the Ottoman Empire with the city of Mosul, in Ottoman Iraq, as its administrative center.

== History ==
The sanjak was established after Selim I occupied Mosul in 1516/1517. It was part of Diyarbekir Eyalet until 1534. It was then transferred to Luristan Eyalet, then Baghdad Eyalet. During the years of 1563–1566 and 1571–1573 it was part of Shahrizor Eyalet. In 1586 it became part of the newly established Mosul Eyalet.

In 1851 the Eyalet of Mosul was dissolved. The Sanjak of Mosul was not attached to another province until 1855, when it became part of Van Eyalet. In 1866 it was transferred to Baghdad Eyalet, which became Baghdad Vilayet in 1869. In 1880 it became part of the Vilayet of Mosul.
