= Murder of Du'a Khalil Aswad =

Iraqi honor killing victim

- Du'a Khalil Aswad
- Native name: دعاء خليل أسود
- Date: c. 7 April 2007
- Location: Bashiqa, Nineveh Governorate, Iraq
- Type: Stoning
- Cause: Honor killing
- Target: Du'a Khalil Aswad
- Perpetrators: A mob estimated at between eight and tens of men, mostly relatives of the victim
- Outcome: Death of Du'a Khalil Aswad, international outrage, reprisal attacks
- Deaths: 1 (Du'a Khalil Aswad)
- Burial: Initially dishonorably buried, later exhumed for investigation and reburied

Du'a Khalil Aswad (دعاء خليل أسود) (c. 1989 – c. 7 April 2007) was a 17-year-old Iraqi Kurdish girl of the Yazidi faith who was stoned to death in Bashiqa, Nineveh, northern Iraq in early April 2007, the victim of an honor killing. It is believed that she was killed around 7 April 2007, but the incident did not come to light until video of the stoning, apparently recorded on multiple cell phones, appeared on the Internet. The rumor that the stoning was connected to her alleged conversion to Islam prompted reprisals against Yazidis by Sunnis, including the 2007 Mosul massacre.

== Background ==
Du'a Khalil Aswad was born to a Yazidi family from Bashiqa. She was killed aged 17. Before her killing, some reports claimed that she had converted to Islam to marry a Sunni Muslim boy. However, other reports claimed that she did not come home one night, which caused her family to shame her.

The narrative attributing Du'a's death to her conversion to Islam originated primarily on jihadist online forums rather than from credible reporting. Members of these forums deliberately omitted details of Du'a's relationship with a Muslim man when circulating the story, as including them would have framed the killing as an honor killing rather than religious martyrdom, undermining its usefulness for mobilizing violence against Yazidis. The conversion narrative was subsequently picked up by non-jihadist Arabic forums and social networking sites, where it gradually became the dominant version of events in online Arabic discourse despite being at odds with official accounts.

The majority of Kurdish news sources, international media, and the United Nations Assistance Mission for Iraq consistently described the killing as an honor killing related to Du'a having befriended a Muslim man and spent a night away from home. Jihadist groups carrying out retaliatory attacks against Yazidis made sure not to mention Du'a's association with a young man in their statements, characterizing her death instead as martyrdom for Islam. Scholars have noted that this mischaracterization not only led to the killing of hundreds of innocent Yazidis in retaliatory attacks but also covered up and undermined the underlying problem; honor killings which had escalated significantly in the Kurdish region following 2003.

According to a reporter in who interviewed local Yazidis at the scene of the murder,

After Du'a's death, the international media widely repeated a claim made on a number of Islamic extremist websites that she had been killed because she converted to Islam, but local reports do not concur. Some people tell me she had run away with her Muslim boyfriend and they had been stopped at a checkpoint outside Mosul; others say she had been seen by her father and uncle just talking with the boy in public and, fearing her family's reaction, they had sought protection at the police station. Either way, the police handed Du'a into the custody of a local Yazidi sheikh.

Accounts of events following Du'a being stopped at the checkpoint vary significantly. Some reports state that police handed her directly to a local Yazidi sheikh. More detailed accounts describe Du'a and her companion fleeing to a local police station out of fear, whereupon police handed her to a notable local Yazidi elder, at whose home she stayed for several days. The elder subsequently handed her to her uncle after receiving assurances from the family that she had been forgiven and could return home safely. Whether the family members who gave these assurances were among those later responsible for her death remains unknown, as does the precise manner in which Du'a came to be in the mob's hands, with some accounts claiming she was ambushed on her way home and others stating the mob entered her home and dragged her out.

== Killing ==
The killing was carried out by a group variously described as consisting eight or nine men or tens of men, mostly Du'a's relatives, in the street in Bashiqa in broad daylight. The broader crowd of bystanders, which some reports estimated to range from a few hundred up to 2,000 individuals, included uniformed police officers, none of whom attempted to intervene. Multiple bystanders filmed the killing on mobile phones, with the footage later circulating widely on the internet.

The mob captured Du'a and took her to the Bashiqa town square; and was reportedly stripped naked to symbolize that she had dishonored her family and religion. Although she was stripped naked, some of the crowd attempted to keep her genitals covered. She was then surrounded by the men who began stoning her. During the stoning, Du'a repeatedly attempted to get up, although the mob kept taunting her and throwing large rocks and pieces of concrete at her head. The stoning lasted around 30 minutes, after which Du'a died. After she had died, her body was tied to a car and dragged through the streets. The men buried her with the remains of a dead stray dog.

== Response and sectarian attacks ==
The killing did not initially attract local or international media attention, as honor killings in the Kurdish region were relatively commonplace at the time; the United Nations Assistance Mission for Iraq had that year expressed concern about the continuing killing of women in the name of family honor in northern Iraq. It was not until footage of Du'a's killing was uploaded to the internet and began circulating widely that international media coverage prompted a response from authorities.

Media reports and condemnation statements from organizations including Kurdish Women's Human Rights Watch, Amnesty International, and the UNAMI put pressure on the Kurdistan Regional Government, which launched an investigation and made four arrests in May 2007. The video also prompted protest marches by local women's associations against honor crimes across the Kurdistan region. The subsequent wave of retaliatory violence was directed overwhelmingly against Yazidis by jihadist groups. Hundreds of women from various parts of Kurdistan Region protested in Erbil and called for an end to honor killings.

The Yazidi Supreme Spiritual Council condemned the killing immediately following the incident. Karim Sulaiman, spokesman for the council, stated that religious leaders had demanded the law be applied and that the killing "doesn't reflect our culture and religion." Yazidi religious leader Sheikh Allu Khalaf stated that stoning has no basis in Yazidi religious doctrine, saying "We don't have anything in our religion about stoning people; it is not acceptable."

On 23 April 2007, 23 Yazidi workers returning from a local factory were ordered off their bus by Islamist militants, who checked their identity cards, allowed Christian passengers to leave, and shot the Yazidi passengers execution-style. The Islamic State of Iraq claimed responsibility, which was widely believed to be a reprisal attack for the murder of Du'a. The same day also witnessed another reprisal attack, claimed by Jamaat Ansar al-Sunna, of a suicide car bomb that targeted the village of Tel Isqof, killing 25 Yazidis and Assyrians. A Yazidi baker and three of his workers were killed in Mosul on 26 April, and two Yazidi policemen were killed three days later. Between April and August 2007 a sustained campaign of militant attacks targeted Yazidi communities, killing, maiming and displacing hundreds while forcing many others from their jobs and universities across the northern region. Throughout this period, Yazidi civilians targeted had no connection to Du'a's killing. The Qahtaniyah bombings on the Yazidi towns of Kahtaniya and Jazeera in August 2007, killed at least 800 and wounded another 1,500 people.

Both the murder of Du'a and the reprisal attacks were condemned by Amnesty International and the Kurdistan Regional Government which asked the federal government to investigate.

Following the execution of the Yazidi workers, Yazidis took to the streets of Bashiqa in protest. Many Muslim residents of the area responded by shuttering their shops and remaining indoors, fearing reprisal attacks from Yazidis.

After the June 2014 Northern Iraq offensive, the Islamic State of Iraq and the Levant captured Bashiqa and renamed it to Du'a City.

== Trial ==
In 2010, four men were found guilty of murdering Du'a Khalil Aswad and sentenced to death. Two of them were her cousins, Aras Farid Salim and Wahid Farid Salim. The other two were Reyaz Kamal Omar and Zeyad Mahmmud Khder.

== See also ==
- Stoning of Aisha Ibrahim Duhulow
- Genocide of Yazidis by ISIL
- Murder of Farkhunda
- Femicide
- Honor killing

=== Honor killings involving Iraqis ===
- Noor Almaleki – 20-year-old Iraqi American woman murdered by her father's vehicle in Phoenix, Arizona, United States in 2009 for refusing an arranged marriage.
- Banaz Mahmod – 20-year-old Kurdish woman killed by her family in Mitcham, South London, United Kingdom for ending a forced marriage and having a relationship of her choice.
