= April 2007 Yezidi massacre =

Massacre of Yazidis

April 2007 Yazidi massacre
- Part of the Iraqi civil war (2006–2008)
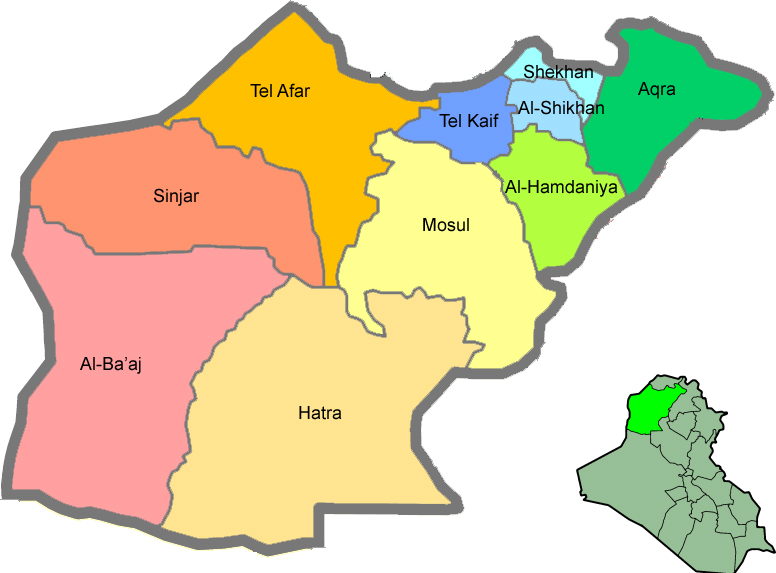
- Al-Hamdaniya District, Nineveh Governorate
- Location: Mosul, Al-Hamdaniya District, Iraq
- Date: April 22, 2007; 2:00pm (UTC+03:00)
- Target: Yazidis
- Attack type: Massacre, Ethnic violence
- Deaths: 23
- Perpetrator: Unknown

The April 2007 Yazidi massacre was a massacre of Yazidis that took place on April 22, 2007, in Mosul, in northern Iraq.

== Massacre ==
At around 2 PM (GMT+3), a bus carrying workers from the Mosul Textile Factory en route to Bashiqa, Al-Hamdaniya District was stopped by cars owned by unidentified attackers. With the bus now stationary, the attackers got on, and checked the passengers' identity cards. According to Iraqi police, after checking their identification, the gunmen told the Muslim and Christian passengers to get off the bus. They then drove the bus to eastern Mosul with 23 remaining passengers, all Yazidis, where the hostages were made to lie face down in front of a wall and shot, execution-style.

== Reactions ==
According to The New York Times, hundreds of Yazidis from Bashiqa gathered in the street to protest the killings.

== See also ==
- Qahtaniyah bombings, later that same year in August 2007
- Genocide of Yazidis by the Islamic State
- Sinjar massacre
