= Bahzani =

Bahzani به‌حزانی (Bahzanê)
- Town
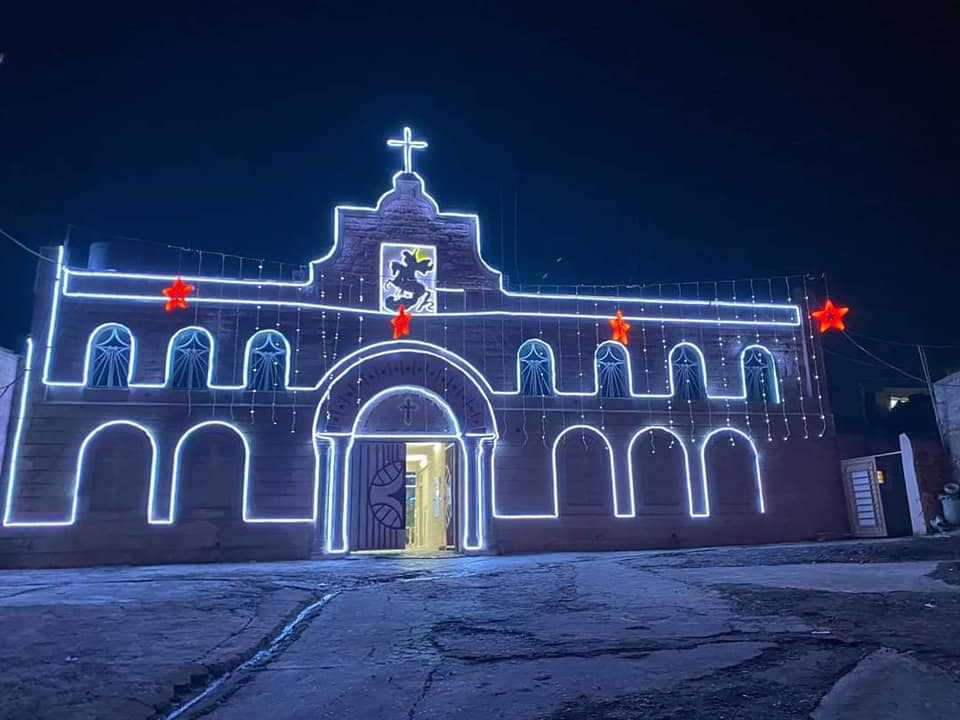
- Christmas in Bahzani
- Interactive map of Bahzani
- Location in Iraq
- Coordinates: 36°27′40″N 43°20′19″E
- Country: Iraq
- District: Al-Hamdaniya District
- Governorate: Ninawa Governorate

Bahzani (Kurdish: به‌حزانی, romanized: Bahzanê, Arabic: بحزاني), literally from the Syriac words meaning "house of treasure," is a town located in the Al-Hamdaniya District of the Ninawa Governorate in northern Iraq.

== Population ==
The town of Bahzani, together with its twin village Bashiqa, have historically hosted diverse populations. The majority of residents today are Yazidis, who speak Arabic as their mother language. Other populations include Assyrians, Shia Muslims, Sunni Muslims, and Shabaks.

== History ==
Bahzani is official Iraqi territory but has been claimed by the Kurdistan Region since the fall of Saddam Hussein in 2003. According to Article 140 of the Iraqi constitution, a referendum should decide whether it continues to be managed by Iraq or by the Kurdish government. Its status is still not fully understood. According to Human Rights Watch, UNHCR and other human rights organizations, the townspeople are threatened with violence should they vote against inclusion of the city in the Kurdistan Region.

In August 2014, the town's residents fled for Iraqi Kurdistan following the invasion of the town by ISIS. In late 2016, it was liberated along with Bashiqa. Many displaced residents have since returned and rebuilt its Yazidi temples and its church.

== Yazidi holy sites ==
Bahzani has numerous Yazidi shrines, including:

- Shrine of Ebû Rîsh
- Shrine of Sheikh Bako. The shrine is accompanied by a spring with a fig tree, which is visited by pilgrims with fevers. Pilgrims fasten small bits of their clothes on the tree and feed the fish in the spring.
- Shrine of Sitt Hebîbe, also known as Marta Hebîbta ("the Beloved Lady"; the wife of Sheikh Muhemmed). She also has a shrine near Bashiqa.
- Shrine of Mes'ûd
- Shrine of Dayka Jakan

== See also ==
- Assyrians in Iraq
- Yazidis in Iraq
- Bashiqa
- Nineveh Plains
