= Al-Hamdaniya District =

Al-Hamdaniya District قضاء الحمدانية Syriac: ܪܘܼܣܬܵܩܵܐ ܕ ܒܵܓ݂ܕܝܼܕܵܐ
- District
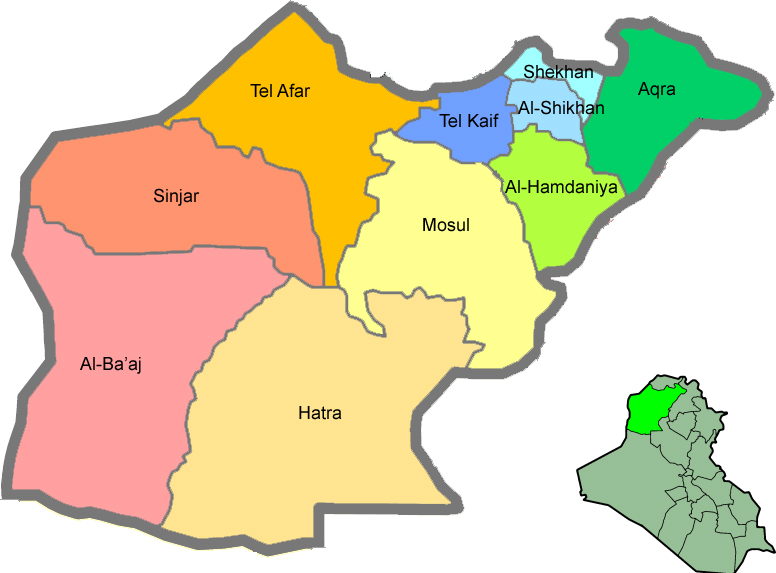
- Al-Hamdaniyah district (light green) in Ninawa

- Location within Iraq
- Country: Iraq
- Governorate: Nineveh, smaller parts in Duhok (de facto)
- Seat: Bakhdida

Area
  - Total: 1,155 km^{2} (446 sq mi)

Population (2024)
  - Total: 249,808
- Time zone: UTC+3 (AST)

Al-Hamdaniya District (also known as Bakhdida District; Arabic: قضاء الحمدانية; Syriac: ܪܘܼܣܬܩܐ ܕ ܒܓ݂ܕܝܕܐ) is a district in the north-east of the Nineveh Governorate (Ninawa) of Iraq. The district as well as the districts of Tel Keppe and Shekhan make up the Nineveh Plains region.

Al-Hamdaniya District is divided between four sub-districts:

- Aski Kalak (Khabat) - mostly Kurdish, some Assyrians and Yazidis (de facto part of Aqrah district in Kurdistan)
- al-Namrud (al-Khidhr) - mostly Arab and Turkmen, some Kaka'is, Shabak and Assyrian
- Bartillah (Baritleh) - mostly Assyrian, some Shabak, Arab and Turkmen
- Qaraqosh (Bakhdida) - mostly Assyrians, some Arabs, Shabak, Turkmen and Kaka'is

Towns and villages include:

- Bakhdida (Qaraqosh)
- Tahrawa
- Bashiqa
- Bahzani
- Bartella
- Karamlesh
- Balawat
- Khedr Ilias

== See also ==
- Assyrian homeland
- Proposals for Assyrian autonomy in Iraq
- Assyrian settlements
