= Yezidis =

Ethno-religious group of Kurdistan

Yezidis Êzidî
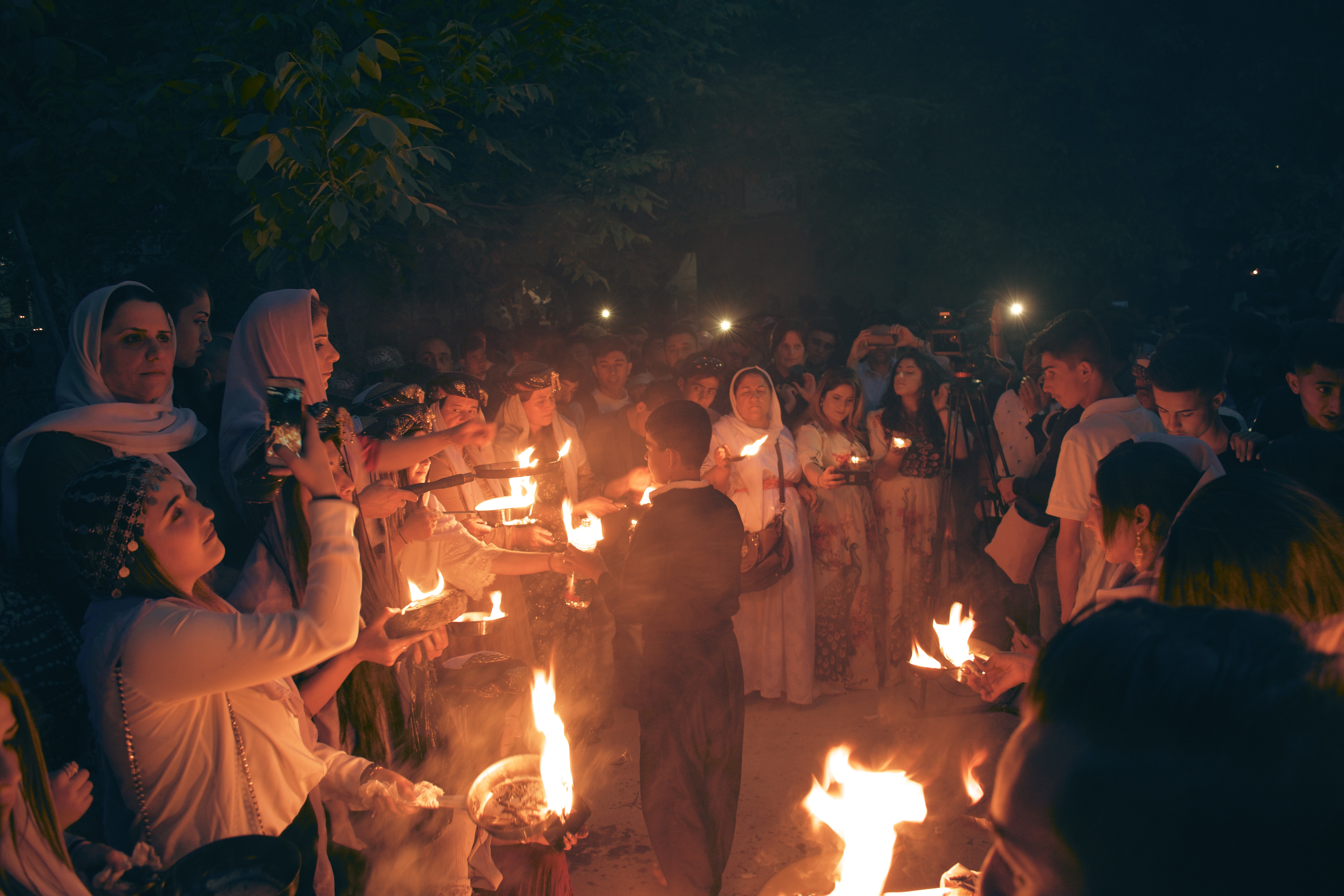
- Yezidis celebrating Yazidi New Year at Lalish in 2018, in Nineveh Governorate, Iraq

Total population
- est. 700,000–1,500,000

Regions with significant populations
- See list of Yazidi settlements

Listed by countries
- Iraq: 500,000–700,000
- Germany: 230,000 (2022 estimate)
- Belgium: 35,000 (2018 estimate)
- Armenia: 31,079 (2022 census)
- Russia: 26,257 (2021 census)
- Syria: 15,000 (2017 estimate)
- Georgia: 12,174 (2014 census)
- France: 10,000 (2018 estimate)
- Sweden: 6,000 (2018 estimate)
- United States: 5,000 (2017 estimate)
- Turkey: 5,000 (2010 estimate)
- Australia: 4,123 (2021 census)
- Canada: 1,200 (2018 estimate)

Languages
- Kurmanji

Yazidis, also spelled Yezidis (/jə.ˈziː.diz/; Êzidî), are a Kurdish-speaking endogamous religious group indigenous to Kurdistan, a geographical region in West Asia that includes parts of Iraq, Syria, Turkey, and Iran, with small numbers living in Armenia and Georgia. The majority of Yazidis remaining in the Middle East today live in Iraq, primarily in the governorates of Nineveh and Duhok.

There is a disagreement among scholars and in Yazidi circles on whether the Yazidi people are a distinct ethnoreligious group or a religious sub-group of the Kurds, an Iranic ethnic group. Yazidism is the ethnic religion of the Yazidi people. It developed through a complex historical process involving a pre-Islamic Kurdish religious substratum and the teachings of Sheikh Adi ibn Musafir. Scholars generally regard it as an independent religious tradition with deep roots in ancient Iranian beliefs, shaped by later Sufi influences. Although it shares certain parallels with Zoroastrianism, it is not considered to have developed out of it, and scholars note the presence of some pre-Zoroastrian elements.

Yazidis have been severely persecuted by their Muslim neighbours. In modern times, Yazidis face persecution particularly by ISIS. Due to ongoing terrorist attacks in Kurdish regions, many Yazidis sought refuge in Western countries. The 2014 Yazidi genocide that was carried out by the Islamic State saw over 5,000 Yazidis killed and thousands of Yazidi women and girls forced into sexual slavery, as well as the flight of more than 500,000 Yazidi refugees.

== Etymology ==
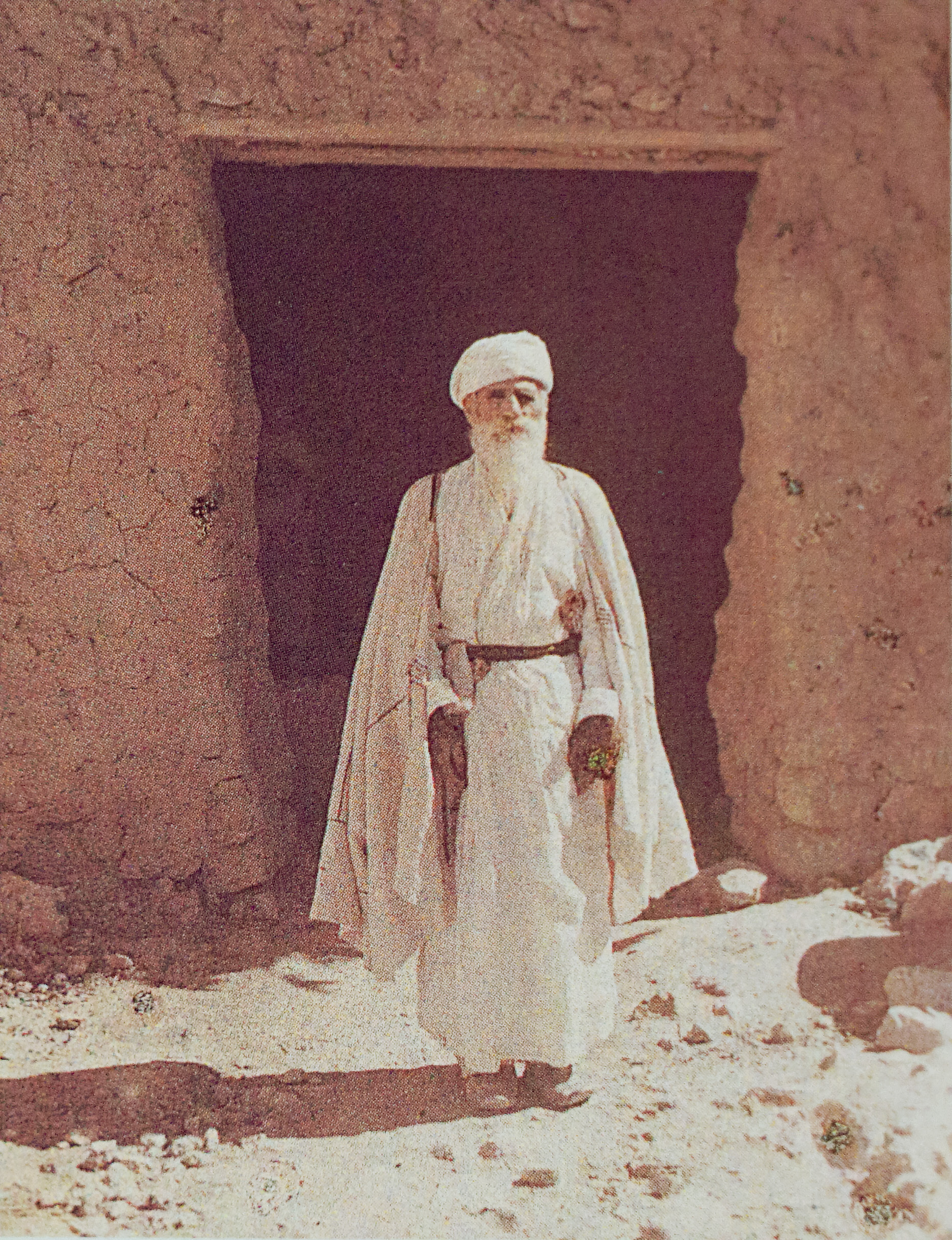
Yazidi chief in Bashiqa, Iraq; picture by Albert Kahn (1910s)

The Yazidis' own name for themselves is Êzidî or, in some areas, Dasinî, although the latter, strictly speaking, is a tribal name. Some western scholars derive the name from the Umayyad Caliph Yazid ibn Muawiyah (Yazid I). However, all Yazidis reject any relationship between their name and the caliph. The word Yazidi means 'the servant of the creator'. Although Yazidism was not named after Yazid ibn Muawiyah, the caliph was revered in Yazidism. Other scholars derive it from Old Iranian yazata, Middle Persian yazad, "divine being". Another derivation of the word origin relates to Ez dā ('Created me'): Yazidis also refer to Xwedê ez dam ('God created me') and to Em miletê ezdaîn ('We are the Ezdayi nation').

== History ==
=== Early history ===
==== Origin ====
Yazidism took shape from a pre-Islamic Kurdish religious substratum, which was reorganized and given its lasting doctrinal and institutional form through the reforms and teachings of Sheikh Adi ibn Musafir and his successors in the 12th and 13th centuries. Scholars have proposed differing sources for this older substratum: Philip Kreyenbroek and Khanna Omarkhali point to parallels with Zoroastrianism and the neighboring Yaresan tradition as evidence of a shared Indo-Iranian background. Artur Rodziewicz has argued that too little attention has been paid to possible Western influences on Yazidism, proposing instead affinities with the pagan Harranian ('Sabian') religion and with Hellenistic and Orphic currents transmitted through regional centers such as Antioch, Edessa, and Nisibis. According to the scholars Majid Hassan Ali, Dimitri Pirbari and Rustam Rzgoyan, the Yazidi religion formed on the basis of an ancient Mesopotamian religion and the teachings of Sheikh Adi, who drew on a mixture of ancient traditions and rites, blended with the mysticism in which he believed and preached a possibility of direct union with God. Kreyenbroek notes that earlier characterizations of Yazidism as an offshoot of Islam have "been widely given up" among scholars, who instead broadly agree that this older system of Kurdish religious tradition, whatever its ultimate origin, was formative in shaping the religion.

The ninth-century East Syriac bishop Thomas of Marga, in his history of regional monasticism, described communities in the area where Yazidism originated, among them the village of Koph, near Akre in what is now Duhok governorate, whose inhabitants were described as an amalgam of Magians, Manichaeans, and heathens, "mad and drunk with the worship of idols and of trees and other things," venerating fire, sacred springs, and "the sun which was held to be a god by those who worshipped it." Practices consistent with this older substratum persist in Yazidism today, including belief in metempsychosis, sun worship, dietary and dress prohibitions, and fire-centred ritual observance such as the nightly lighting of wicks throughout the Lalish valley and the candelabrum ceremony of the autumn Feast of the Assembly.

Bar Hebraeus, a thirteenth-century Jacobite monk of the Mar Mattai Monastery, in his Chronicon Syriacum, refers to "Sheikh Adi, whom the Kurds of the country of Mosul hold to be a prophet." Describing a Kurdish group from the mountains of Madai known as the Taïrahites, who descended on the surrounding countryside in 1205 CE and "wrought great destruction in those countries," Bar Hebraeus records that they "had not entered the Faith of the Muslims, but had adopted the primitive paganism and Magianism." Rodziewicz notes that while Kurdologists have typically fixed on this last term and read the passage as describing Zoroastrian survival, Bar Hebraeus himself does not identify the group as Zoroastrian, only as holding beliefs that were neither Muslim nor Christian.

The Shafi'i scholar Ibn Kathir (1301–1373) similarly records a people called the Tirhiye practicing an older religion he identifies as Magian in the same territories later inhabited by Yazidis, noting that later generations of this group adopted a religion he describes as a hybrid with Islam. Communities already known as Yazidis, described as venerating the Umayyad caliph Yazid ibn Muawiya, are likewise attested in the region prior to Sheikh Adi's arrival, existing alongside these older Iranian-linked religious currents.

Prior to the 12th century, Yazidis in historical sources are identified as Dāsinī (Dasni). The name referred both to a religious community and to a territorial entity centered in the region of Dāsin, located northeast of Mosul and southwest of Amadiya in present-day northern Iraq. Yazidis identified as Dasini are recorded as inhabiting this region continuously, and the designation remained in use for Yazidi princes until the mid-19th century. The term Dasināyā is also used for Yazidis in Syriac and Neo-Aramaic Christian languages. Majid Hassan Ali identifies this period preceding the religious reforms associated with the saint Sheikh Adi ibn Musafir, as the phase during which Yazidi religious life was structured primarily around rituals, mythology, customs, and largely oral transmission.

==== Sheikh Adi's arrival ====
Sheikh Adi, a twelfth-century mystic venerated as an incarnation of God in Yazidism, was born in the 1070s in Bait Far in the Beqaa Valley of present-day Lebanon. He studied in Baghdad among the prominent mystics and theologians of his era, including Ahmad al-Ghazali, and became closely associated with Abd al-Qadir al-Gilani; his milieu was permeated by the ideas of Mansur al-Hallaj, whose teaching Rodziewicz identifies as a significant influence transmitted to Sheikh Adi through al-Ghazali. Around the age of thirty he travelled to the Hakkari mountains, settling in the valley of Lalish.

Sheikh Adi's arrival in Lalish heralded a new era of considerable change in Yazidi history, as reforms in the system of rule, politics and religion transformed and modernised the Yazidi way of life. Before his arrival the community existed as scattered tribes with a shared theological orientation but no unified form. After coming to Lalish, he united the scattered Yazidi tribes around him and returned to them their ancient temple, which had been occupied by members of other faiths.

The Yazidi religion was revised and reestablished between the 12th and 13th centuries on the basis of Sheikh Adi's teachings, which drew from a mixture of ancient traditions and rites and blended them with the mysticism in which he believed. After its reestablishment during his era, the Yazidi belief system became open to accepting others, allowing them to embrace the religion. The religious reforms of the 12th and 13th centuries were the conglomeration of ancient traditions the Yazidi had been practicing before the coming of Sheikh Adi, along with the reforms that he introduced. The Yazidi religion is understood as rooted in ancient religious rites and traditions still practiced today, such as sanctifying the sun, the ritual of slaughtering bulls at the temple of Lalish, and celebrating feast days related to nature such as Sersal (the Yazidi new year), Bilindah, and the summer and winter festivals.

The era of his activity is described in Yazidi tradition as the "epoch of saints", during which his disciples spread his teaching of the possibility of direct union of the human spirit with God. Originally, the teaching had a supra-religious character, with the knowledge of God as its primary priority. Over time, due to continuous persecution and a hostile environment, the followers of this teaching gradually closed themselves within their community and became an ethno-religious community, one which, today, a person can only be born into.

The caste structure that came to define Yazidi social and religious life is conventionally traced to Sheikh Adi's reforms. The three castes consist of Sheikhs (şêx), who fulfill spiritual and administrative functions; Pirs (pîr), who fulfill religious and pastoral functions; and Murids (mirîd), the laypeople and followers. The relationship between the castes is seen as spiritually equivalent to siblinghood and thus, intermarriage between castes is considered sinful and is strictly forbidden. This system is understood as having served a protective function, fostering communal cohesion and continuity in the face of sustained pressure from proselytizing majorities. The long duration of this system, maintained continuously since Sheikh Adi's era, has been cited as a primary factor in the development of a distinct Yazidi ethno-religious identity over subsequent centuries.

The earliest Yazidi written source, the Mišūr of P'īr Sīnī Bahrī (604 AH / 1207–1208 CE), confirms that the caste system was still in formation in the decades immediately following Sheikh Adi's passing, with its final consolidation completed under Sheikh Hasan in the mid-13th century.

Among scholars, Sheikh Adi is also credited with introducing many elements from Sufism to Yazidism, such as the concept of nafs (ego-soul), reverence of some Sufi mystics and saints including Dhu'l Nun al-Misri, Bayazid Bastami and Abdulqadir al-Gilani, as well as metaphysical ideas and ascetic practices found in Sufism.

Sheikh Adi's era is also credited with a flourishing of Yazidi religious literature. Sacred poetry (Qewls, Beyts, Qasida, etc.) were composed, and hagiographies of Yazidi saints compiled. The corpus of Qewls that constitutes the primary source of Yazidi religious knowledge took its foundational form during this period. The Yazidi creed crystallized around his legacy in the formula still recited today: "Miletê Êzdî, Dîn—Şerfedîn" ("We are the Yazidi people, our religion is Sharfadin.")

Sheikh Adi's disciples spread his teaching through the surrounding region, and his following grew to draw people from Mosul, the Hakkari mountains, Syria, and Iran. Ibn al-Athir, writing within living memory of his death, records that "people from the cultivated lands and the mountains of those regions attached themselves to him, obeyed him and had a good opinion of him, for he was very famous." Ibn Khallikan records that devotees who gathered around him came to revere him to a degree "which had never been heard of," eventually treating him as their qibla and "their treasure for the hereafter". Al-Dhahabi records that his reputation for asceticism, teaching, and reported miracles spread widely enough that, in his words, "had they occurred in ancient times, they would have become legendary tales". Al-Maqrizi (d. 1441) similarly records that his tomb became one of the most visited pilgrimage sites in the region, with his followers remaining at his hermitage after his death "following his custom and tradition," while the people around them displayed the same extraordinary veneration and respect they had shown during his lifetime. Jami (died 1492), in his Nafahat al-uns, notes that "his grave in that region is one of the praised pilgrimage sites, at which miraculous graces and manifest signs occur."

Yazidi Mishur manuscripts preserving accounts of this period list entire tribes that gathered around him, recording the geographic spread of his following from Basra and Baghdad to Kandahar, and from Armenia to Damascus and Cairo. The Adawi brotherhood, named after Sheikh Adi and used to refer to the Yazidi religion, is attested across the Middle East through the fourteenth and fifteenth centuries, with one branch centered in Cairo under Sheikh Zeyneddin Adani, before gradually dissolving into the surrounding Muslim majority.

Following Sheikh Adi's passing in 1162, leadership passed to his nephew Sakhr Abu'l-Barakat, and subsequently to his grandnephew Sheikh Adi ibn Abu'l-Barakat, who combined the community's spiritual inheritance with political authority before his death fighting Mongol forces in 1223. Sheikh Hasan, son of Sheikh Adi ibn Abu l-Barakat, brought this consolidation to its height during the 1230s and 1240s, presiding over the Sheikhan principality at its greatest territorial and political extent. His era saw the creation of a collective council of religious figures ("Council of Holy Men") analogous to a synod, centralization of authority was carried out and the foundational institutions and rules of Yazidi society and religion were established. This period ended with his assassination in 1246 at the hands of Badr al-Din Lu'lu, ruler of Mosul.

The political history of the Yazidis begins after the consolidation of the Yazidi community in the 12th–14th centuries. Yazidism was embraced by many Kurdish tribes and emirates, reaching as far west as Antioch and as far east as Sulaymaniyah. In addition, Sherefkhan Bidlisi writes in Şerefname that seven of the most important Kurdish tribes were Yezidi. Yezidism was the official religion of numerous Kurdish emirates and principalities, including the principalities of Sheikhan, Ezdikhan, Bohtan, Mahmudi, Donboli and the Emirate of Kilis.

==== Territory and religious administrative structure ====
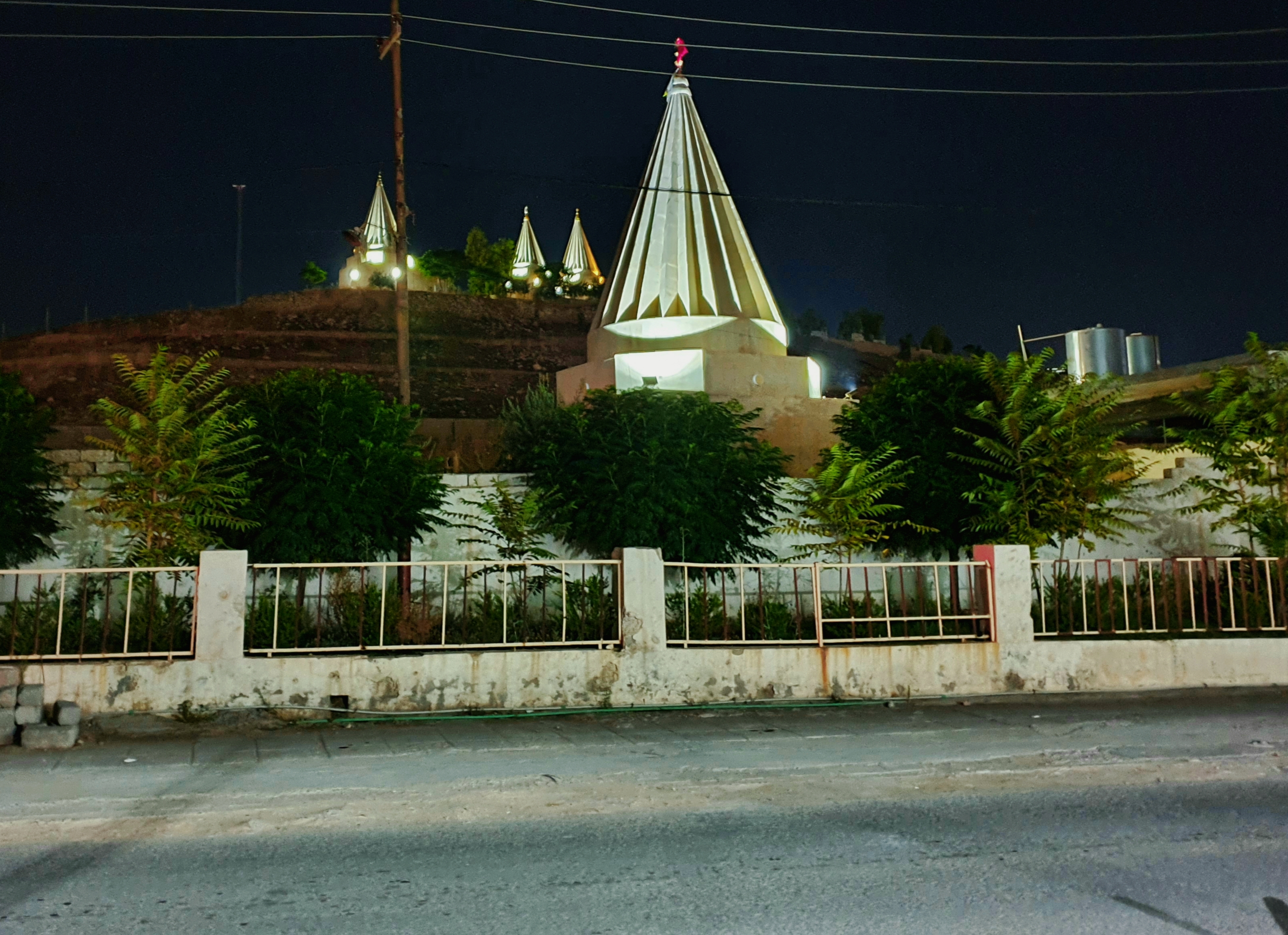
Yazidi temple in Bashiqa, 2020

From the 14th century onward, Yazidis developed their own religious and political institutions in the regions where they lived. The Yezidi territory was divided into seven administrative centres, each having its own Sincaq (banner, flag, province, region), more commonly known as Tawis among the Yezidis. Sincaqs are sacred bronze effigies bearing the image of a bird or peacock to symbolize Tawûsî Melek. They serve as symbols of power for each administrative centre, namely:

1. Tawisa Enzel: Welatşêx (Şêxan) – Lalish
2. Tawisa Şingalê: Shingal District
3. Tawisa Hekkarê: sometimes also called Tawisa Zozana: Historical region of Hakkari (Hakkari, Şırnak, Van and Duhok).
4. Tawisa Welatê Xalta: Region around Siirt, Batman, Diyarbakir, Mardin, etc.
5. Tawisa Helebê: Aleppo and Afrin.
6. Tawisa Tewrêzê: the city of Tabriz, located in today's Iran (Yazidis lived in the western hinterland in the Khoy region).
7. Tawisa Misqofa (Moscow): Renamed from Tawisa Serhedê after the exodus of the Yazidis from Serhed to the Russian Empire. Serhed is a region covering the cities of Kars, Ardahan, Erzurum, Ağri, Van, Bitlis and Muş.

Every six months, the Yezidi Qewals, who are trained reciters of Qewls and other forms of sacred oral Yezidi tradition, were sent out to other Yezidi-inhabited areas with military protection from the central administrative region of Shekhan and the spiritual centre of Lalish. This tradition served to preserve the Yazidi faith and doctrine. The Qewals, supported by voluntary alms, led a Sincaq through Yazidi villages to maintain spiritual legitimacy and symbolize the authority of Lalish and the Mîr.

==== Early relations in the Middle East ====
Due to the ever-growing large and influential power of the Yezidis, they began to be perceived as a threat by the neighbouring Muslims, leading to a rapid intensification of the Yezidi-Muslim conflict that would last for centuries. Yezidis were subject to brutal persecution by Arabs, Persians, Turks and Sunni Kurds. Two of the most known early and major expeditions against the Yezidis took place in 1246, when the Yezidi leader, Sheikh Hassan ibn Adi was killed by Badr Ad-Din Lulu, and 1414, when a joint army of neighbouring Sunni Kurdish tribes ransacked Lalish. During these conflicts, many important Yezidi chiefs were forcibly converted to Islam, leading to a gradual decline of the Yezidi power from the 15th century. However, Yezidis were also able to establish alliances with the authorities and neighbouring powers at various times, some Yezidi tribes allied with Qara Yusuf of Kara Qoyunlu, while others allied with Uzun Hasan of the rival Aq Qoyunlu against the Timurids. During Saladin's reign, Yezidis served as troops, ambassadors and they were given lands to govern.

=== Ottoman period ===
==== 16th century ====
Yezidis came into contact with the Ottomans for the first time in the early 16th century and lived as semi-independent entities under the Ottoman Empire. The Ottomans had conquered Kurdish regions and installed their own governors in Diyarbekir, Urfa, Shingal and Mosul. In 1516 AD, Sultan Selim the Grim launched an invasion into Syria, capturing Aleppo and Damascus from the Mamluks of Egypt. The chief of the Kurds in Aleppo was Qasim Beg, he had long been at odds with the Mamluks who wished to install Sheikh Izz ed-Din, a Yezidi, in his stead. Despite Qasim Beg paying homage to the Sultan, Sheikh Izz ed-Din was still able to have himself named the Emir of the Kurds after persuading the local Ottoman governors to execute Qasim Beg for treason. However, due to Sheikh Izz ed-Din leaving no heirs after his death, the title was returned to the family of Qasim Beg.

Yezidis were a large and numerous group living in many places, namely, based on Evliya Çelebi's reports, in Bingöl, Bitlis, Van, Hazo, Amedi, Diyarbekir, Hasankeyf, Cizir and Duhok. Yezidi leaders occupied important positions within the provincial Ottoman system and were appointed as governors as far as Tikrit and Kerek. Yezidis were also participants in commerce and river transportation of their territory through contact with other ethnicities and religions. Evliya Çelebi describes the quality of Yezidi products in the following manner:

The quality of Yezidis' grapes and honey is priceless, and their raisins are highly priced in Baghdad, Basra and Lahsa markets. They have many Berry trees. Sinjar has important mineral[s] as well.

Çelebi also reports that Yezidis collected fees by taking people from Hasankeyf to the other side with their ferries.

Under the reign of Sultan Suleyman in 1534, the Yezidi leader, Hussein Beg was given the control over the domain of the Soran Emirate together with its capital of Erbil, and the Bahdinan Emirate with its capital of Amediye. Hussein Beg's father, Hassan Beg, had allied himself with the victorious Ottomans after the Battle of Chaldiran and was famed for his diplomatic and political expertise, which helped him bring Mosul under his rule and become a powerful and influential figure. His son, Hussein Beg, succeeded him after his death in 1534. Despite the persecution and the brutal rule over the Muslims of Soran, the Yezidis were able to maintain a large political, military power under the short-lived, but prosperous leadership of Hussein Beg and enjoy a rare period of peace and freedom from persecution. The Muslims of Soran opposed Hussein Beg's rule, and attempted to overthrow the Dasini rulers several times, their initial attempts were unsuccessful and were repelled, until the neighbouring Muslim rulers formed an alliance against Hussein Beg, and captured Erbil while Hussein Beg was absent and on a visit to Sheikhan, or Istanbul according to other sources. Hussein Beg's attempts to retake the city were unsuccessful due to the local support enjoyed by the Muslim rulers and resulted in the death of 500 Yezidi warriors. After the defeat, Hussein Beg was summoned back to Istanbul and executed.

As the relations were deteriorating with the Ottomans and strained with the Sunni Kurds, the Ottomans exploited from these tensions and used religious differences to control both groups. In 1566, Abu al-S'ud al-'Amadi al-Kurdi, who was the Mufti of the Ottoman Empire and Sheikh al-Islam, cooperated with the Ottoman Sultans and issued fatwas that legitimized the Sultan's killing of Yezidis, enslavement of Yezidi women and the sale of Yezidi slaves in the markets. This resulted in Yezidis being subject to constant Ottoman military pressure and their territories being considered Dar Al-Harb from a religious standpoint.

In later periods, Sunni Kurdish princes, particularly those of the Bahdinan principality and its Muslim clerics, requested the Ottoman Sultan to eliminate the Yazidis with the justification of Yazidi being apostates. Numerous Ottoman documents reveal the role of the princes, including one dating back to 1568 AD, which reads:

The necessity of ending the corruption and evil-doing of the Dasini sect [i.e. Yazidis] and [asking the Ottoman state to send] firmans (orders) to the governors of Mosul and Erbil to punish the Dasinis

According to another document dating back to 1571 AD, the Prince of Bahdinan, Sultan Husayn Waly, demanded the Ottomans to send a firman (Order) to the states (Wilayāt) of Jazira, Mosul, Amadiya, and Erbil to arrest the Yezidi leaders.

==== 17th century ====
During the first half of the 17th century, Yezidis became a very powerful entity under the leadership of Ezidi Mirza, a young, yet reputable military leader who gained fame after leading a counter-attack against Muslim raiders in his hometown of Bashiqa and inflicting a devastating defeat despite being outnumbered. He went on to become the head of the Bashiqa-Bahzani and in later stages of his life, also the Governor of Mosul. He and his troops fought for the Ottoman side during Battle of Baghdad together with the Mîr of the Yezidis at the time, Zeynal Javkhali, and six other Yezidi chieftains. In 1649, Êzidî Mirza was appointed as the governor of Mosul, a title which he held until his death in 1651. Êzidî Mirza is mentioned in several Yezidi sagas until today.

During the 17th century, the Ottomans launched numerous expeditions against the Yezidis in Shingal, who had long controlled the trading routes around Shingal, attacked Ottoman caravans and refused to pay the taxes levied by the Ottomans. The first expedition was led by the Ottoman Grand Vizier, Nasuh Pasha, and took place in 1613 AD, which resulted in a Yezidi victory and 7,000 of the Ottoman soldiers being slaughtered according to the reports of Evliya Çelebi.

In 1640, another expedition against the Yezidis of Shingal was launched by another Grand Vizier, Melek Ahmed Pasha of Diyarbekir. The Ottoman troops surrounded Shingal mountains and stormed Yezidi positions. Despite heavy casualties, the Ottomans eventually succeeded in capturing the mountain. Evliya Çelebi, who was an eyewitness of the event, reports that 3,060 Yezidis were killed on the Shingal mountain, and writes about the wealth of the Yezidis and the abundance of the Yezidi areas, which he describes as being prosperous in the Yezidis' hands. He reports the spoils from the Ottoman attacks on Yezidis in the following manner:

These Yezidis were as wealthy as Croesus; All the multitudes of troops from the provinces of Van and Diyarbekir and Mardin who came to the aid of Melek Ahmed Pasha, all the Kurdistan soldiery who participated in plundering the money and food and drink and copper vessels and household furnishings and the like which emerged over ten days from the Saçlı Dağı caves, could not carry away more than a drop in the sea and a mote in the sun. For ever since the event of Kerbela these people have been rich, and no king had ever conquered them before.

In 1655, Evliya Çelebi revisited Shingal to catch up with Firari Mustafa Pasha, the governor of Diyarbekir whom Evliya had been ordered to collect an old debt from. Firari Mustafa Pasha had encamped in Shingal to collect taxes from the Yezidis, when he sent a delegation to parley with the locals and demand tax payments, the Yezidis replied "if Melek Ahmed Pasha had come back to fight them, they would rub their faces in his footprints, but for Mustafa Pasha, they would only give ten loads of silk", which enraged Mustafa Pasha and provoked him into calling for reinforcements and launching an expedition against the Yezidis of Shingal, the result of this expedition is unknown.

In Evliya's works, the tribes of Rojkî, Halitî (Xaltî), Çekvânî, Bapirî, Celovî, Temânî, Mervanî, Beddi, Tâtekî, Gevarî, Gevaşî, Zêbarî, Bezikî, Modikî, Kanahî and Şikak are mentioned as Yezidis. A lot of phrases are used by Evliya when referring to Yezidis, namely: Saçlı Kürdü (long-haired Kurds), Yezidi Ekrad (Yezidi Kurds), Saçlı Yezidi Kürdleri (long-haired Yezidi Kurds), kavm-i na-pak (impure group), bed-mezheb (bad sect), bî-din (faithless), savm u salât ve hacc u zekât vermezler (they do not know anything about these pillars of Islam), kelb-perest (dog worshippers), and firka-ı dal" (heretic sect).

In 1671, another battle in the Shingal mountain, which lasted for three years between the Sacheli tribe and armies of the neighbouring Pashas, ended up in a victory for the mountaineers, who captured around 4,000 prisoners.

==== Between 1715 and 1809 ====
Yezidis are mentioned in Van Tarihi, a 1715/1716 account by the local imam of the Van city, Ibn-i Nuh, which was about the history of Van. The report describes an Ottoman attack on the Yezidis of Van which took place in 1715. It addresses Yezidi victory during the first waves of attacks and Yezidis capturing the Pasha of the city of Van during the battle. Under the section titled as Harb-i Yezidiyan Der Sahra-yi Canik Ba-Vaniyan (The battle of the Yezidis with Vanis at the desert of Canik), Ibn-i Nuh lists the names of important people who died during the battle and describes a dreadful situation for the Muslims and Islam at the hands of what he describes as Cünd-i Şeytan (The army of the Devil). Under the section Maktel-i Yezidiyan ve Intikam-i Şüheda-i Van (The Killing of Yezidis and the Revenge of the Martyrs of Van), he recounts the Pasha of the city assembling an army of 7,000 soldiers from Ahlat, Adilcevaz and Erçiş to take on the Yezidis and the battle eventually ending up in a victory for the Empire and the Muslims. He describes that this place did not pay Jizya or poll tax and that it was considered the Abode of War. He also mentions that some Christians lost their lives and that many women and children held as captives.

In 1743, Nadir Shah, launched an invasion in the west and was aiming to capture Mosul, sent a force to subdue the Yezidi chieftain As after capturing Altun Kopru and Kirkuk. As had often raided the western provinces of Persia from his base in the mountains around Koi Sanjak. The Persians defeated an army of several thousand Yezidis and killed their leader Yezid. As was able to escape, enlist allies and lay siege to a ruined fort where the Persian cavalry had held Yezidi women captive. The defenders were at the edge of being overrun when the shah's nephew brought reinforcements and stopped the siege. As, who was abandoned by his allies, considered committing suicide, but finally surrendered himself to Nadir Shah instead and was eventually appointed the governor of the district.

Throughout the 18th century, Yezidi mirs of Sheikhan were subjects to the Kurdish Principality of Amadiya, a semi-autonomous fiefdom which guarded the Ottoman frontiers in the east. The rulers, who were strict Sunni Muslims claiming descent from the Abbasids, had ruled Amadiya since the Timurid period. Amadiya was also home to a Jewish community and included Nestorians who were actively proselytized by Dominican missionaries who were stationed there from 1759 to 1779. Yezidis are briefly mentioned by one of the missionaries, Padre Maurizio Garzoni, who reported "the post of the executioner is always given by the princes of Amadiya to a Yezidi, who never loath to shed Muslim blood." Yezidi mirs of Sheikhan were also involved in several rebellions against Amadiya principality; in 1770–1771, Bedagh Beg, who was Mir of Sheikhan at the time, joined a rebellion against the Prince of Amadiya, Ismail Pasha. Bedagh Beg eventually got captured and fined, and 16 years later, his son and successor, Jolo Beg, was involved in another rebellion, but had to later retreat. In 1789–1790, Jolo still maintained the title of Mir and was involved in battles against the Tayy Arabs, who were raiding Sheikhan, but in the following year, Jolo and his brother were executed by Ismail Pasha, who appointed a Khanjar Beg as the Mir in their stead. However, after quarrels with Khanjar, the Mir position was returned to the old Dynasty and Khanjar was replaced by Jolo Beg's son, Hasan Beg.

In Shingal, Yezidis had gained notoriety for raiding every caravan passing between Mardin and Mosul. Yezidi raiders operated as far as in the routes between Anah and Baghdad, where one band attacked a caravan in 1782 and seized 30 donkey-loads of cotton goods. Caravans that were escorted by well-armed guards were often able to fight off raiders, whereas fate of other caravans was often a total loss or a ransom. The favourite targets were lightly armed official couriers who relied on speed to reach their destination. In one case, a captured courier was found to be carrying 40,000 carats of high-grade pearls. As a result, several expeditions were launched against the Yezidis; the punitive expeditions from Baghdad, first one launched in 1715 and a later one in 1753, inflicted heavy casualties. However, subsequently, the expeditions launched against Shingal from Mosul and Baghdad became less severe and was counted as a cost of doing business by the raiders.

In 1785, the governor of Mosul, Abd el-Baqi Pasha led a raid on the nomadic Dina tribe of Yezidis living east of Tigris near Duhok, led by a young chief named Kor Namir Agha (The Blind Namir Agha) who was blind in one eye. Whilst the Pasha's troops were looting the deserted villages, they were ambushed and the Pasha, together with his brother were killed. The panic-stricken troops fled to Mosul while being pursued by the fighters of the Dina tribe. The sequel of this encounter is not recorded.

The enslavement of Yezidi captives and military action against Yezidis was legitimized by Muslim theologians, who classified Yezidis as heretics. At least eight expeditions are recorded between 1767 and 1809 and according to the French orientalist, Roger Lescot, the Ottomans launched 15 campaigns against the Yezidis of Shingal and Sheikhan in the 18th century alone. One expedition against the Yezidis of Shingal was led by the Governor of Baghdad, Ali Pasha, who forced many families into converting to Islam. Another expedition in 1809 was led by the new Governor of Baghdad, Sulayman Pasha, who burnt down Yezidi farms and beheaded Yezidi chieftains. The 18th–19th centuries saw a further decline of the Yazidi influence, power and population. With the ending of the semi-autonomous Kurdish principalities and the series of Ottoman Tanzimat reforms from the mid-19th century onward made the Yezidi-populated regions more prone to localized political instabilities. Furthermore, being excluded from the status of "People of the Book", the Yezidis were not granted religious rights that were enjoyed by other groups such as Christians and Jews under the Ottoman millet system.

==== Yazidi–Muzuri feud and the Sheikhan massacre ====
By the early 19th century, Yezidis were involved in a long feud with the neighbouring Sunni Kurdish tribe of Mizuri who with one of their clerics had issued in a fatwa in 1724 that Yezidis were infidels and apostates and that killing them was a religious duty. Yezidi women and the Yezidi property were to be considered spoils of war. In another encounter in 1802, the Alghushiyya branch of Mizuris raided the Yezidi village of Ghabara in western Sheikhan, killed nearly a hundred people and occupied Lalish for eight months. Furthermore, during this period, conflict erupted between the tribe of Mizuri and the principality of Bahdinan, which resulted in a clash in 1804. The Mizuris stormed into the city of Amadiya and captured the family of the Bahdinan prince, Qubad Pasha, and imprisoned him together with his brother, after which they plundered the city and remained in there until at the request of Ahmed Pasha, another Bahdinan prince who ruled Akre, the Yazidis of the Dina tribe came to the aid and the Mizuris were expelled from Amadiya, restoring order in the city.

Ahmed Pasha sought to put an end to inter-tribal feuds and reconcile his neighbours. Thus, the Yezidi leader Ali Beg, sent a word the Mizuri chieftain Ali Agha al-Balatayi, expressing the desire for peace and friendship and offering him to act as a kirîv (sponsor) for the circumcision of his son. However, another prince of Bahdinan, Said Pasha, persuaded Mîr Elî Beg to kill the Mizuri chieftain and rid everyone of him, intending to put another tribal leader in his position. Some sources report that he threatened Mîr Elî Beg that he would kill his entire family if he refused to do this. Ali Agha al-Balatayi responded favourably to Mîr Elî Beg's invitation and a few days later, arrived with a small escort at the town of Baadre, where the residence of the Yezidi princely family is located. It is unknown whether he took a small escort out of disdain for the Yezidi leader, or for the purpose of demonstrating his trust in his host. Upon his arrival, Ali Beg had him and his son, Sinjan Agha, treacherously murdered. This murder which was condemned by the Yazidi clergy and Yazidi chieftains, as it went against Yazidi canons and tribal customs. It also led to a great degree of anger among the Mizuris and provoking them into gathering for great raid against the town of Baadre. In anticipation of the attack, thousands of Yezidi warriors stationed themselves in Baadre. The raid was called off due to fear of Bahdinan forces assembling against the Mizuris when the Pasha of Amadiya, who was also the Prince of Bahdinan and was suspected of having conspired in the Mizuri chieftain's assassination, announced his opposition to the raid.

Thereby, Mulla Yahya al-Mizuri, a cousin or nephew to the Mizuri chieftain and a respected religious dignitary, unsuccessfully attempted to plead for rectification from the Bahdinan princes Ahmed Pasha and his brother, Said Pasha, who declined to sanction punitive action against Yezidis and blamed Ali Agha for naively accepting Ali Beg's offer and venturing into his enemy's own country without adequate escort, furthermore, they also killed the son of Mulla Yahya. As a result, he turned to the Pasha of Rawanduz, Muhammad Pasha. During that time, Muhammad Pasha had become the most powerful and independent ruler in Kurdistan. He had begun minting his own coins and declared independence from the Ottoman Empire. Meanwhile, the Ottomans were preoccupied with the rebellion of Muhammad Ali Pasha in Egypt, who had declared independence from the Ottoman Empire, Muhammad Pasha had annexed several neighboring Kurdish principalities to his domains and also intended to seize the Bahdinan emirate and Yazidi lands. In 1815, for the sake of power, he executed his two uncles, Timur Khan and Wahbi Beg, along with their sons, to rid himself of contenders for the rulership. Knowing this, Mulla Yahya persuaded him into sending a punitive force to punish the Yezidis. Accounts regarding the manner in which he persuaded Muhammad Pasha vary from him visiting and seeking the aid of the wali of Baghdad, who upon hearing the Mullah's grievances sent a letter to Muhammad Pasha and urged him to punish Yezidis for their misdeeds, to the Mullah directly visiting Muhammad Pasha, with whom he was on very friendly terms.

Muhammad Pasha prepared an army of 40,000 to 50,000 against the Yezidis, he divided his force into two groups, one led by his brother, Rasul, and the other one led by himself. These forces marched in March 1832, crossing the Great Zab River and first entering and killing many inhabitants of the Yezidi village, Kallak-a Dasinyya, which was situated near Erbil and was the border between Yezidis and Soran Principality until the 19th century. These forces proceeded to march and capture other Yezidi villages. After arriving in Sheikhan, Muhammad Pasha's forces seized the village of Khatara and marched onwards to Alqosh, where they were confronted by a joint force of Yezidis and the Bahdinan who were led by Yusuf Abdo, a Bahdinan leader from Amadiya, and Baba Hurmuz, who was the head of the Christian monastery in Alqosh. These joint forces then left their positions and relocated to the town of Baadre. Ali Beg wished to negotiate, but Muhammad Pasha, influenced by the clerics Mulla Yahya al-Mizuri and Muhammad Khati, rejected any chance of reconciliation. Yezidis of Sheikhan were defeated and subject to devastating massacres where slaughter of both the elderly and young, rape and slavery were some of the tactics. Yezidi property, including gold and silver was plundered and looted, and numerous towns and villages previously inhabited by the Yezidis were demographically islamized. Afterwards, Muhammad Pasha sent a large force to Shingal where he was met with the resistance of the Yezidis under the leadership of Ali Beg's wife. After numerous defeats, Muhammad Pasha's forces eventually succeeded in capturing the district. The Yezidis who survived the massacres took refuge in distant areas including but not limited to Tur Abdin, Mount Judi and the less-affected Shingal region. After controlling most of the Yezidi territory, the Pasha's forces enslaved and took home around 10,000 Yezidi captives, mostly females and children together with Ali Beg, to Rawanduz, the capital of the princedom. Upon the arriving in the capital, the prisoners were asked to convert to Islam, many of them, including Ali Beg and his entourage, rejected the request and thus were taken and executed at Gali Ali Beg, which is until today named after Ali Beg. Christian communities lying in the path of Muhammad Pasha's army were also victim to the massacres, the town of Alqosh was sacked, large number of its inhabitants were put to the sword and the Rabban Hormizd monastery was plundered and its monks, together with the Abbot, Gabriel Dambo, were put to death. A large amount of the ancient manuscripts were destroyed or lost. The monastery of Sheikh Matta suffered the same fate.

After putting Yezidis of Sheikhan to the sword, Muhammad Pasha invaded the rest of the Bahdinan, attacking Akre and after a few days, besieging the fortress of Akre which was regarded as almost impregnable and meeting the resistance of the Kurdish tribe of Zibari. Thereafter he marched towards Amadiya which capitulated after a brief siege. The entire region, from Khabur to Great Zab rivers, was brought under Muhammad Pasha's rule, including Zakho and Duhok. Muhammad Pasha appointed Musa Pasha, a relative of the Bahdinan prince Said Pasha, as the governor of the capital. Musa Pasha, who had been on bad terms with Said Pasha, had offered valuable assistance to Muhammad Pasha during the attack on Amadiya.

==== Attacks by Bedir Khan Beg and persecution of Yazidis and Christians ====
Between 1840 and 1844, Yezidis of Tur Abdin were repeatedly attacked by the ruler of Bohtan, Bedirkhan Beg, who had previously aided Muhammad Pasha during his incursions against Bahdinan and the Yezidis of Sheikhan. Bedirkhan was a member of the Ezizan family, the hereditary rulers of Bohtan and one of the oldest and most prominent Kurdish families whom according to Sharafkhan Bidlisi were originally adherents of Yezidism. The Ezizan claimed descent from Abd al-Aziz, a son of the famous Islamic commander and companion of the Prophet, Khalid Ibn al-Walid. Yezidis of Tur Abdin had a strong tribal structure and were active participants in the political affairs. One of the largest attacks took place in 1844, when Bedirkhan sent a large army to force Yazidis into accepting Islam, those who refused were captured and killed. Seven Yezidi villages converted to Islam out of fear. The local Christian population also suffered massacres in 1843 and 1846 by the hand of Bedirkhan and his allies Han Mahmoud and Nurallah Bey.

Yezidis were object of extra attention from Bedirkhan. During Bayram feast, when Muslims celebrate Abraham's ritual sacrifice of Isaac by slaughtering animals, Bedirkhan would round up Yezidi captives for a grisly ceremony where he would with his own hand slaughter those Yezidis who had refused to convert to Islam. A medical missionary from Urmia who visited Derguleh in 1846 reported seeing 40–50 Yezidi converts in Bedirkhan's castle, enjoying Bedirkhan's special attention and jealousy among his less favoured attendants.

Pressure and protests from the European Powers, namely France and England, demanding a stop to the massacres of Nestorians and removal of Bedirkhan Beg, led to the Ottoman forces, with the support of Yezidi fighters, invading his territories in 1846–1847. At the beginning of the conflict Bedirkhan was able to successfully defeat the Ottoman army sent against him and afterwards, he decided to sever all connections with the Ottoman Empire by proclaiming independence of his state and creating a currency of his own bearing the inscription "Bedirkhan, the Emir Of Bohtan". However, his success did not last for long, Ottomans attacked again and Bedirkhan Beg, despite offering some resistance, vacated Cizre and took refuge in the fortress of Evreh. His ally, Han Mahmoud, who was on his way to assist Bedirkhan, was intercepted in Tillo and defeated by Ottoman forces and Yezidi fighters. Bedirkhan had to surrender to the Ottomans at Evreh Castle in Eruh, Siirt on the 4 July 1847. He was put in chains with his family and eventually transferred to Constantinople.

=== End of the Ottoman period ===
==== Reign of Abdul Hamid II (1876–1909) ====
Towards the end of the 19th century, the Ottoman policies towards Yezidis gained a new dimension under the reign of Abdulhamid II, under whose regime the Muslim Identity became increasingly essential for the Sultan's perceptions of loyalty among his subjects. As missionary activity and nationalism among non-Muslim groups was on the rise, conversion to Islam in order to ensure their political loyalty was crucial in the perspective of Abdulhamid's government. Conscription was one of the steps taken in order to convert them. Thereafter, Yezidis would be subject to persecution from Omer Wehbi Pasha, who had been sent to Mosul by the Sultan for a task involving institutionalization of a conscription system, collection of taxes, resettlement of tribes, and crushing local tribal rebellions. He took the initiative of completing his tasks through violence due to the lack of cooperation from Yezidis. Around 500 Yezidis died in the Shingal campaign of November–December 1892, Lalish was forcibly converted into a madrasah, sacred objects of the Yezidis were confiscated, mosques built in Yezidi villages and the Yezidi Mir Mirza Beg was provoked into converting to Islam. However, in contrast to the expectations of Ottomans, the campaign of the Pasha had crucial influence in setting a widespread religious revival in motion at Shingal. Yezidi refugees fleeing from Sheikhan, including both the commoners and the clergy, took shelter on Shingal mountain and their stories about the atrocities in Sheikhan that were committed by Muslims facilitated the vigoruous millenarian and anti-Muslim propaganda that were carried out by two religious personalities from Sheikhan who had settled in Shingal, Mirza al-Kabari and Alias Khallu. Slogans about an imminent and new Yezidi reign of justice and prosperity against Muslim oppression were successful in mobilizing large sections of the local Yezidi populace. This prompted Omar Wehbi Pasha to launch an unsuccessful intervention in Shingal, which resulted in the faqir, Hemoyê Shero, who had earlier declared himself the Paramount of Shingal, together with his followers becoming the focus of anti-Muslim resistance and increasing their military capacity by seizing a huge amount of Turkish armaments and ammunition which would be a determining factor in World War I.

In the following years, a dispute occurred among the community on the mountain, causing the power of Musqura and Mihirkan tribes to deteriorate as they included large Muslim sections and were thus traditionally viewed with the suspicion of being inclined to insitage Ottoman interference in the Shingali affairs. On 9 December 1892, Sultan Abdulhamid sent a telegram in which he dismissed Omar Wehbi Pasha from his post and ordered him to remain in Mosul, pending arrival of a commission of inquiry and to be prepared to answer the charges of using Ottoman troops in combat without being given permission by the Ministry of War. Four months later the Pasha returned to the capital in disgrace. Yezidis finally regained the possession of Lalish in 1904, and the stolen sacred objects were returned to them in 1914.

As Hemoye Shero had acquired the Paramountcy of Sinjar, his followers drastically increased in numbers and they began to serve as a compact and organized group which started to be named as the Fuqara tribe. Among the Fuqara, tribal cohesion very much depended on membership in the faqir religious class to which all the male members of the tribe belonged.

At the Tur Abdin foothills west of Shingal, Hasan Kanjo, a Yezidi chieftain, converted to Islam and joined the Hamidiye together with his tribe. He later became the right-hand man and lieutenant of Ibrahim Pasha, the powerful chieftain of Milan confederacy and highly regarded by the Sultan Abdulhamid. Hasan Kanjo built a fortress at Haleli, east of Viranşehir, to serve as a base for fighting the desert Arab tribes including the Shammar. Members of his tribe had been allowed to keep their Yezidi faith and were camped around the fortress.

In Mosul, a new Governor by the name of Aziz Pasha was appointed; he had arranged a peace settlement in Shingal and allowed Yezidis of Sheikhan to practice their religion again. The Yezidi Mir, Mirza Beg, among other prominent converts to Islam, resumed their old faith. However, the price for these compromises was enforcement of military service, continuance of the Islamic schools in the settlements on a voluntary basis and the surrender of the Lalish sanctuary to Muslim dervishes, who had established a retreat there and operated an Islamic school. Lalish would later be largely abandoned and left in ruins, with reports of overgrowth of nettles and shrubbery in places where the roofs had fallen in, and the dome above Sheikh Adi's mausoleum smashed, allowing the sun to shine inside, until Yezidis would rebuild and regain the possession of the sanctuary in 1904.

==== World War I ====
During World War I, the Armenian genocide of 1915 caused a mass exodus of Yezidis from Van, Kars, and Bazîd, who together with many Armenians, fled from the Ottoman Empire in masses to Transcaucasia, following their kinsfolk who had already settled in territories of Russian Empire after fleeing during the Russo-Turkish wars in 1828–1829 and 1877–1878. In May 1918, Ottomans crossed Akhuryan river in order to invade the Armenian Republic. One column captured Alexandropol and marched north of Mount Aragats, where eighty Yezidis were massacred at Kurdsky Pamb, towards the Transcaucasian railway line to Baku. The other column marched southeast along the left bank of the Aras river to secure the recently completed line to Tabriz. At Sardarabad, the column marching southeast was confronted by a 4,000 strong Armenian force which included 700 Yezidi cavalry. A few days later, Armenians and Yezidis drove back the northern column from the Bash-Aparan defile on the slopes of Mount Aragats. However, during the first week of June, an armistice was reached whereby the Ottomans could use the key railways, but would leave Yerevan and Echmiadzin to the Armenians. The Yezidi participation in the decisive Battle of Sardarabad is still commemorated by Armenians.

Yezidis in Tur Abdin and Shingal also formed common causes with Christians and fought defensively from their mountain strongholds. Yezidis in Shingal were led by Hemoye Shero, who in 1914–1915 sheltered Christian refugees fleeing from persecution and in 1917, led raids with a mixed Yezidi tribal force against Turkish convoys and military posts on the route to Nusaybin, causing severe disruptions on Turkish communication lines north of the Shingal mountains. Additionally, he fiercely resisted Ottoman attack on the Shingal mountain when Ottoman troops besieged the mountain and briefly occupied Yezidi villages to the south, using Tel Afar as their logistic base. In 1915/1916 the Ottomans, with the support of numerous Sunni Kurdish tribes, initiated widespread persecutions against the Christian communities of Mardin, Nusaybin and Cizre. Leading to waves of Christian refugees, including Armenians and Assyrians fleeing to Shingal in hope of finding shelter among the local Yezidis. By 1916 approximately 900 people had taken permanent residence in Balad (City of Shingal) and the village of Bardahali, which had by then turned into the headquarters of the Fuqara tribe. Hemoye Shero, the chief of Fuqara, promoted Christian settlement on the Mountain through granting them his protection in accordance with a Shingali custom which encouraged the settlement of Christians if a local Yazidi agha would guarantee for them. This helped Hemoye Shero to seize full control of Shingal city, the capital and most important commercial centre of the mountain, as he gained the support of local Christian merchants and thus was able to expand his economic and political prestige and dominance. In 1918, when the Yazidis of Shingal mountain received an ultimatum from Ottomans to hand over the weaponry and the Christian refugees that they were sheltering, or otherwise face consequences. The Yezidis tore the letter up and sent the messengers back naked.

== Identity ==
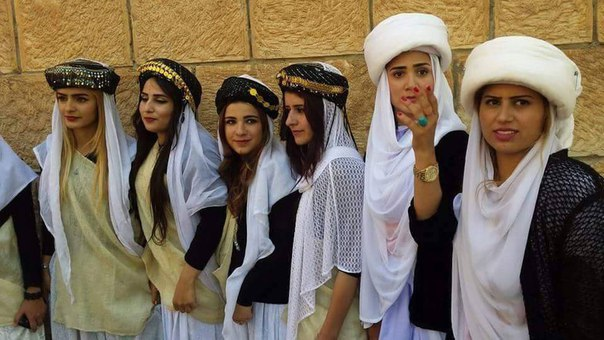
Yazidi women in traditional dress

Yazidi cultural practices are observed in Kurmanji, which is also used by almost all the orally transmitted religious traditions of the Yazidis. The Yazidis in the twin villages of Bashiqa and Bahzani speak Arabic as their mother language, however, the now Arab-speaking tribes in Bashiqa and Bahzani, including but not limited to Xaltî, Dumilî and Hekarî, have historically been classified as Kurdish tribes. Although almost all Yezidis speak in Kurmanji, their exact origin is a matter of dispute among scholars, even among the community itself as well as among Kurds, whether they are ethnically Kurds or form a distinct ethnic group. Yazidis only intermarry with other Yazidis; those who marry non-Yazidis are expelled from their community and are not allowed to call themselves Yazidis.

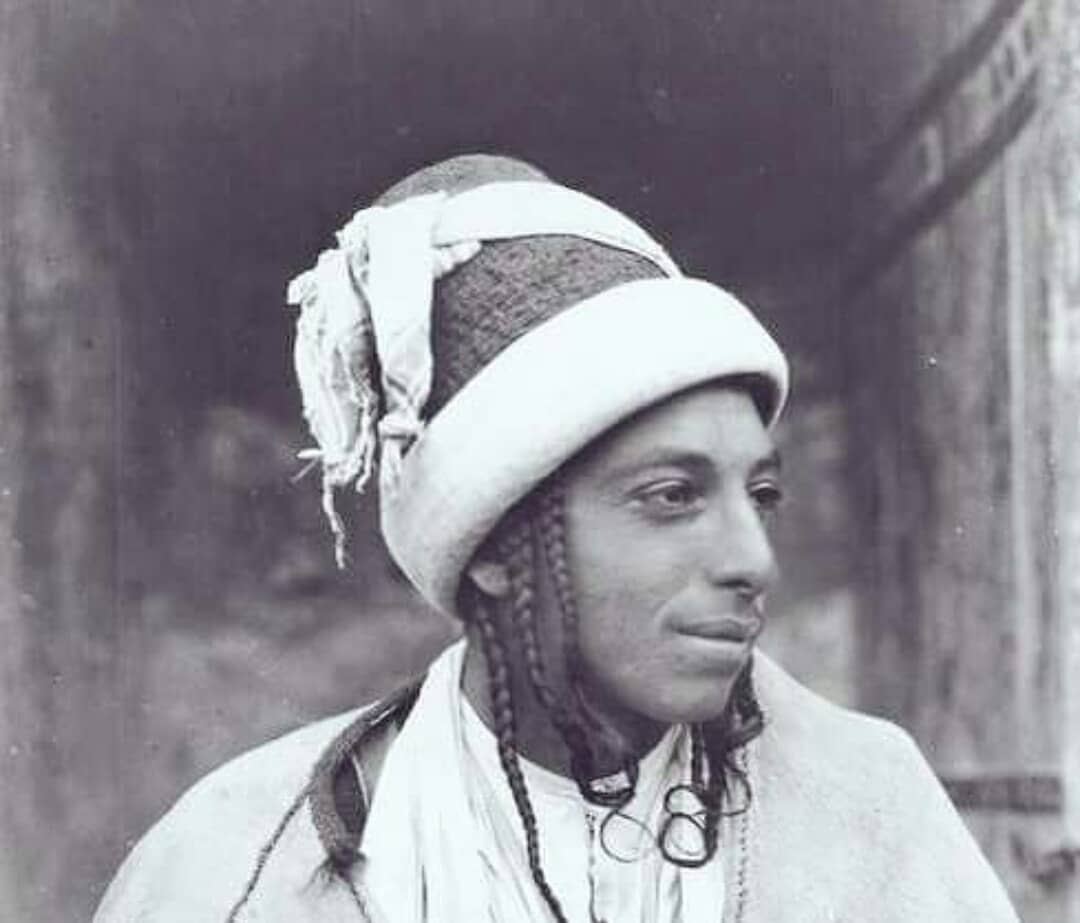
Yazidi boy in traditional clothes. In Sinjar, male Yazidis used to wear pigtails.

Some modern Yazidis identify as a subset of the Kurdish people while others identify as a separate ethno-religious group. In Armenia and Iraq, the Yazidis are recognized as a distinct ethnic group. According to Armenian anthropologist Levon Abrahamian, Yazidis generally believe that Muslim Kurds betrayed Yazidism by converting to Islam, while Yazidis remained faithful to the religion of their ancestors. In the fourteenth century, seven of the most prominent Kurdish tribes were Yazidi, and Yazidism was the religion of the Jazira Kurdish principality. Some traditional myths of the Yazidis tell that the Yazidis were the children of Adam alone and not of Eve, and thus separate from the rest of humanity. In the autonomous Kurdistan Region of Iraq, Yazidis are considered ethnic Kurds and the autonomous region considers Yazidis to be the "original Kurds". The sole Yazidi parliamentarian in the Iraqi Parliament Vian Dakhil also stated her opposition to any move separating Yazidis from Kurds. On the contrary, Aziz Tamoyan, the president of the Yezidi National Union ULE, indicated that the term Yazidi is used for a nation and their language is called Ezdiki and their religion is Sharfadin. According to the researcher Victoria Arakelova, Yazidism is a unique phenomenon, one of the most remarkable illustrations of ethno-religious identity, centred on a religion the Yazidis call Sharfadin. And therefore, it is quite legitimate to speak of the unity of both the Yazidi religious identity and Yazidi ethnicity.

Yazidis distinguish the name of their community from the name of their religion according to the phrase:

Miletê min Êzîd ("My nation—the Yazidis.")
Dîne min Şerfedîn ("My religion—Sharfadin.")

However, this phrase does not come up in the official qewls (religious hymns), rather, in those qewls where the terms Şerfedîn and Êzîd (Êzî) are mentioned together, the term "Atqat" comes up next to Ezid instead of "Millet".

Me dîn Şerfedîne û Êzî atqate. ("Our religion is Sherfedin and belief is Ezi.")

— Qewlê Şerfedîn

Me dîn Şerfedîn, atqad Siltan Êzîde. ("Our religion is Sherfedin, belief is Sultan Ezid.")

— Qewlê Qendîla

Şerfedîn is the name of a son of Sheikh Hasan, who lead the Yezidis in the 13th century and under whose rule the final canonization of the Yezidi religion took place. As a result, Şerfedîn is considered the personification of the Yezidi religion as implied in the aforementioned qewls. Likewise with Sultan Ezid, the name of God's manifestation, who personifies atqat (belief). However, some Yezidis who believe themselves to be a distinct ethnicity, consider "Şerfedîn" to be the name of the religion, meanwhile using "Êzidî" as the ethnonym.

Additionally, the term "Millet" has only recently begun to be understood in a nationalistic sense due to the growing popularity of nationalist ideologies, as a result, the phrase itself has started to be perceived as an ethnic and national declaration. The term "millet" would have originally been equivalent to "religion" and "religious community" rather than ethnicity. Thus, the original meaning of the phrase "Miletê min Ezid" would have been "I belong to the religious group of Ezid".

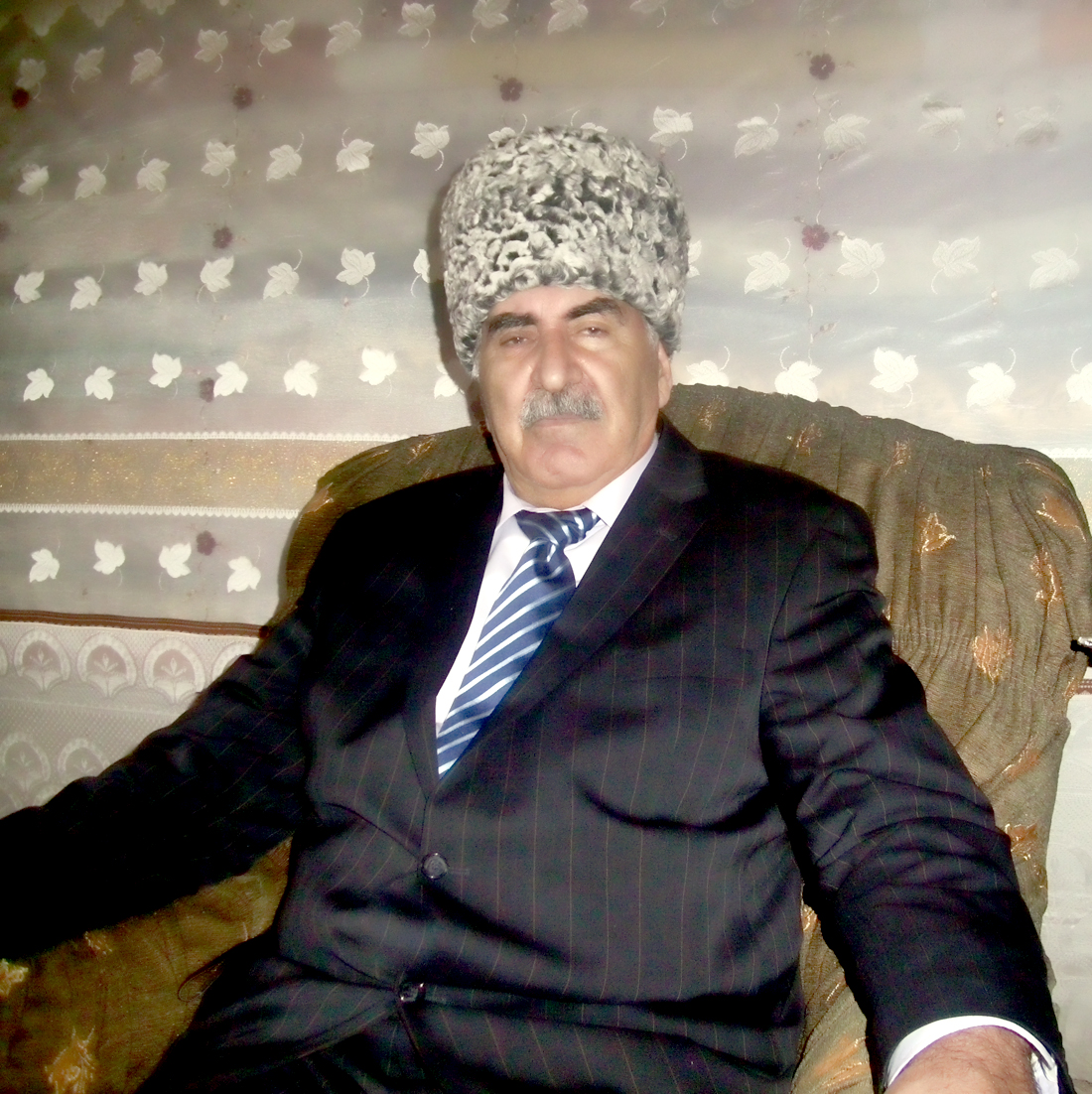
Aziz Tamoyan, the President of the Yezidi National Union ULE in Armenia

Yazidis are regarded as ethnic Kurds in Georgia and Germany. The Soviet Union registered the Yazidis and the Kurds as two different ethnic groups for the 1926 census, but bulked the two together as one ethnicity in the censuses from 1931 to 1989. Sharaf Khan Bidlisi's Sheref-nameh of 1597, which cites seven of the Kurdish tribes as being at least partly Yazidi, and Kurdish tribal confederations as containing substantial Yazidi sections.

Evliya Çelebi referred to Yazidis as "Yezidi Kurds" and described Yazidi soldiers as "wild, bloodthirsty, insanely brave and loyal to their comrades." He also claimed that the shrine of Sheikh Adi was "much more splendid than any Sunni Kurdish shrine."

Conversely, during his research trips in 1895, anthropologist Ernest Chantre visited the Yazidis in today's Turkey and reported that Yazidis called their language zyman e ezda (the language of the Yazidis) and claimed that Kurds spoke their language and not vice versa.

However, there is also evidence that Yezidis in the past too identified as Kurds, for example in a letter sent to the Romanov Emperor of Russia, the Yazidi leader, Usuv Beg writes that his people are Yezidi Kurds. He indicates his nationality as Kurdish, but specifies that they are Yezidi by religion:

I am happy on behalf of 3,000 Families of Yezidi-Kurds, Who 60 years ago, led by my Grandfather Temur Agha, left Turkey and sought refuge in Russia. I would like to express my gratitude and wish success to you and your family. We live very well on earth and under your rule.

In addition, names of some Yazidi villages in Armenia contain Kurdish ethnonyms, such as Sipan village, which was settled in 1828 AD by Yezidis and was called Pampa Kurda/Kurmanca (Kurdish Pamb), until it was renamed to Sipan in the 1970s. In the vicinity, there is another village, that was called "Armenian Pamb", but also was renamed later on, to "Lernapar".

Furthermore, the Yezidi religious authorities, including Baba Sheikh, the Mîr and the Peshimam, frequently have emphasized the Kurdish ethnicity of the Yezidis. As according to letter from mayor of Shekhan to Mosul in 1966, after carrying out investigations and personal meetings with Yezidi religious leaders, Baba Sheikh and the Mir, they found out that Yazidis are considered to be of Kurdish ethnicity and nationality.

When carrying out the investigations and the personal meetings with some leaders of the Yazidis that dwell the region of our province, especially Tahsin Said, the general leader of the nation and its prince, and the Bāba-Shaykh, the religious head of the Yazidis and when enlarging upon the subject, based on what they have said, we note that the origin of the community is in the Kurdish regions of Northern Iraq. Thus, the nationality of its members is considered Kurdish.

— Excerpt from the 1966 letter.

When Tord Wallström, a Swedish journalist, met the Yazidi Mir Tahsin Beg in 1974, Tahsin stated his reason for participating in the Kurdish Revolt. He stated, "I believe in the principles of the revolt. However, there is no relation between the religion and the revolt. I am Kurdish, and all the Yazidis are Kurdish; this is the reason why I joined this revolt". The journalist asked whether all the Yazidis are participating in the revolt, to which Mîr Tahsin responded: "No, but because their participation in the revolt has not been necessary as of yet. I've not requested their participation, but if I do, at least 95% will join the revolt. By the way, the government executed 20 Yazidis recently in Mosul".

Elsewhere, in the Soviet Union, the Kurdish identity played an important role for the Yazidis in Georgia and Armenia, who played a crucial role in promoting a secularized idea of Kurdish nationalism and making in preserving and institutionalizing Kurdish culture, folklore and language in the early 20th century. Soviet Yazidis were able to establish the first Kurdish theatre and radio station in history, in addition, the first Kurdish Latin-based alphabet was created by the Yazidi intellectual Erebê Şemo, who was also responsible for writing the first-ever Kurmanji novel in 1929 titled "Şivanê Kurmanca" (The Kurdish/Kurmanji Shepherd).

The Yezidi Spiritual Council in Lalish released a statement where they emphasized and expressed their pride in the Kurdish identity of Yezidis, based on linguistic, historical, geographical and traditional facts. The statement was signed by the Mir, Baba Sheikh, Sheikh al-Wazir, a Peshimam and a Qawwal.

Historically, there have been persecutions against Yazidis at the hand of some Muslim Kurdish tribes, and this persecution has on numerous occasions threatened the existence of Yazidis as a distinct group.

== Genetics ==
Kurds developed a typical genetic profile called "Modal Kurdish Haplotype" (KMH or MKMH for Muslim Kurds) on subclade J2-M172 with the following loci: 14-15-23-10-11-12. The highest percentage of this haplotype has been measured so far in Yezidis in Armenia:

- Yezidis in Armenia: 11.9%,
- Muslim Kurds of Iraq: 9.5%,
- Armenians: Frc/Ø: 5.7%, max.: 7.4%,
- Sephardic Jews: 2.6%,
- Kurdish Jews: 2.0%,
- Palestinian Arabs: 1.4%,
- Ashkenazi Jews: 1.3%.

A genetic study conducted in 2022 in Iraq on Iraqi, Turkmen, Yazidi, and Kurdish populations revealed that the genetic distance between Yazidis and Kurds was found to be closer than the genetic distance between the Kurdish and the Turkmen population, meaning that the Yazidis were found to be genetically closer to Kurds, indicating a long-shared history between Yazidis and Kurds and same homeland for thousands of years, as well as both coming from Indo-European origins.

According to another genetic study, Yazidis from Northern Iraq may have a stronger genetic continuity with the original Mesopotamian people. The northern Iraqi Yazidi population were found in the middle of a genetic continuum between the Near East and Southeastern Europe.

A genetic study on the Georgian Kurds, most of whom follow Yezidism, showed that the populations with smallest genetic distance from Georgian Kurds were found to be Kurds from Turkey and Iran. The Kurmanji speakers from Turkey were found to be closer to the Zazaki speakers from Turkey than to the Georgian Kurds. Despite the former speaking the same dialect as the Georgian Kurds. According to the study, the Y-chromosome data suggests that the Kurdish group in Georgia was founded by Kurmanji speakers of Turkey.

== Demographics ==
A 2014 documentary on the Yazidis

Historically, the Yazidis lived primarily in communities located in present-day Iraq, Turkey, and Syria and also had significant numbers in Armenia and Georgia. However, events since the end of the 20th century have resulted in considerable demographic shift in these areas as well as mass emigration. As a result, population estimates are unclear in many regions, and estimates of the size of the total population vary.

=== Iraq ===
The majority of Yazidis live in Iraq. Estimates of the size of these communities vary significantly, between 70,000 and 500,000. They are particularly concentrated in northern Iraq in the Nineveh Governorate. The two biggest communities are in the Shekhan District, northeast of Mosul and in the Sinjar District, at the Syrian border 80 kilometres (50 mi) west of Mosul. In Shekhan is the shrine of Sheikh Adi ibn Musafir at Lalish. In the early 1900s most of the settled population of the Syrian Desert were Yazidi. During the 20th century, the Shekhan community struggled for dominance with the more conservative Sinjar community. The demographic profile has probably changed considerably since the beginning of the Iraq War in 2003 and the fall of Saddam Hussein's government.

Traditionally, Yazidis in Iraq lived in isolation and had their own villages. However, many of their villages were destroyed by the Ba'athist government of Saddam Hussein. The Ba'athists created collective villages and forcibly relocated the Yazidis from their historical villages which would be destroyed.

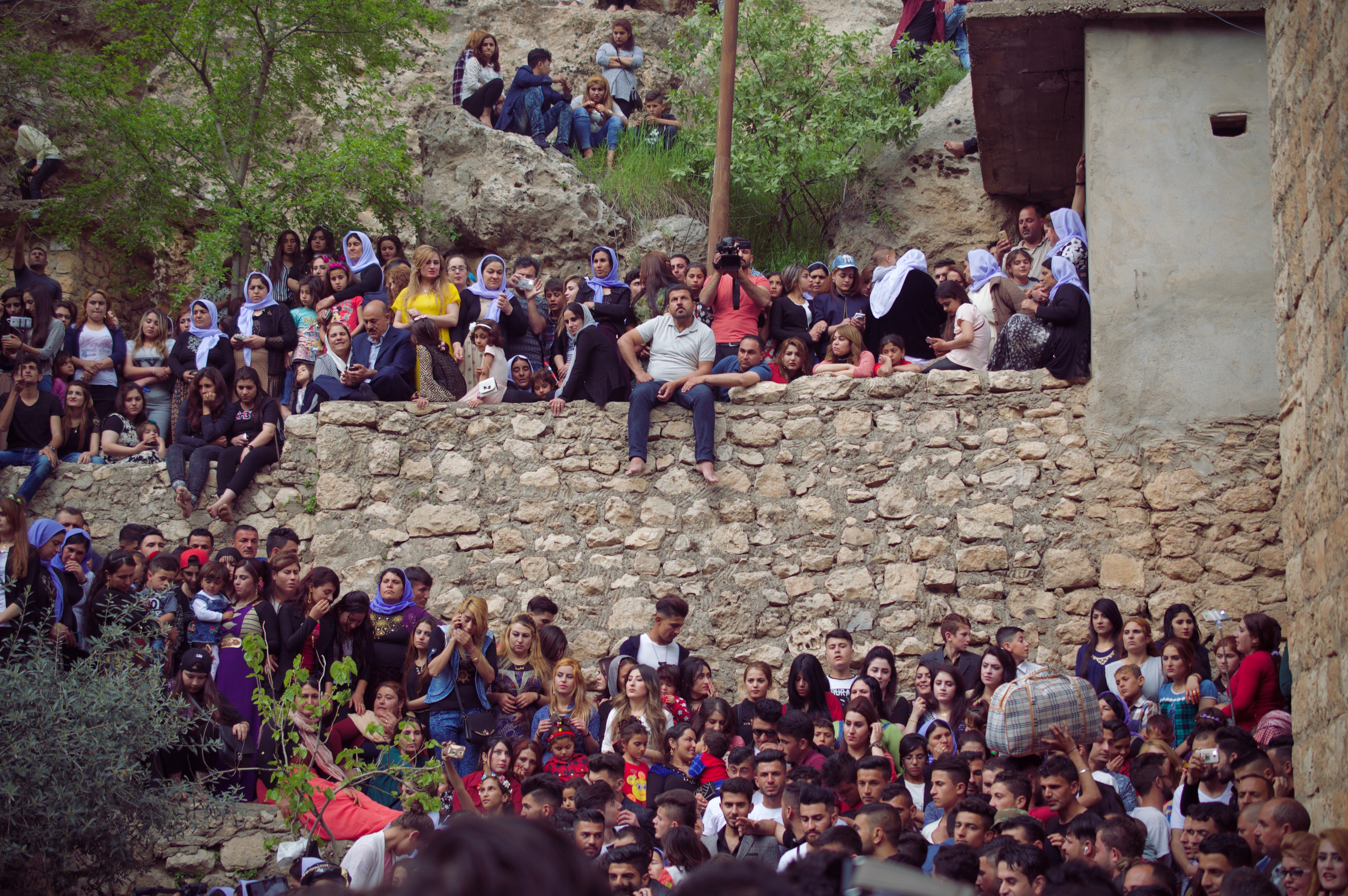
Yazidi new year celebrations in Lalish, 18 April 2017

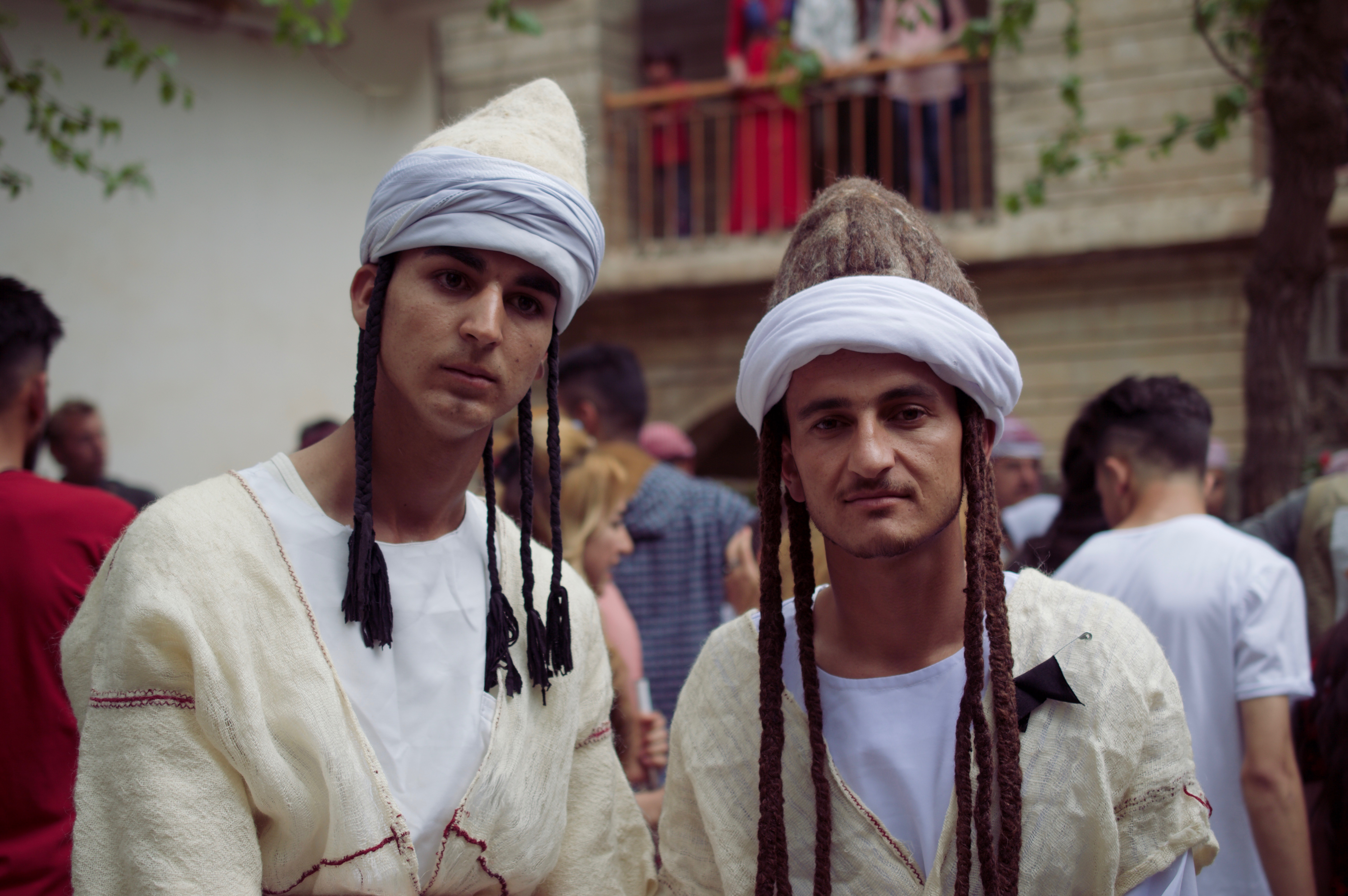
Two Yazidi men at the new year celebrations in Lalish, 18 April 2017

According to the Human Rights Watch, Yazidis were under the Arabisation process of Saddam Hussein between 1970 and 2003. In 2009, some Yazidis who had previously experienced the Arabisation policies of Saddam Hussein complained about the political tactics of leaders of the Kurdistan Region that since 1992 were intended to make Yazidis identify as Kurds. A report from Human Rights Watch (HRW), in 2009, declares that to incorporate disputed territories in northern Iraq—particularly the Nineveh province—into the Kurdish region, the KDP authorities had used KRG's political and economical resources to make Yazidis identify as Kurds. The HRW report also criticises heavy-handed tactics."

=== Syria ===
Yazidis in Syria live primarily in two communities, one in the Al-Jazira area and the other in the Kurd-Dagh. Population numbers for the Syrian Yazidi community are unclear. In 1963, the community was estimated at 10,000, according to the national census, but numbers for 1987 were unavailable. There may be between about 12,000 and 15,000 Yazidis in Syria today, though more than half of the community may have emigrated from Syria since the 1980s.

=== Georgia ===
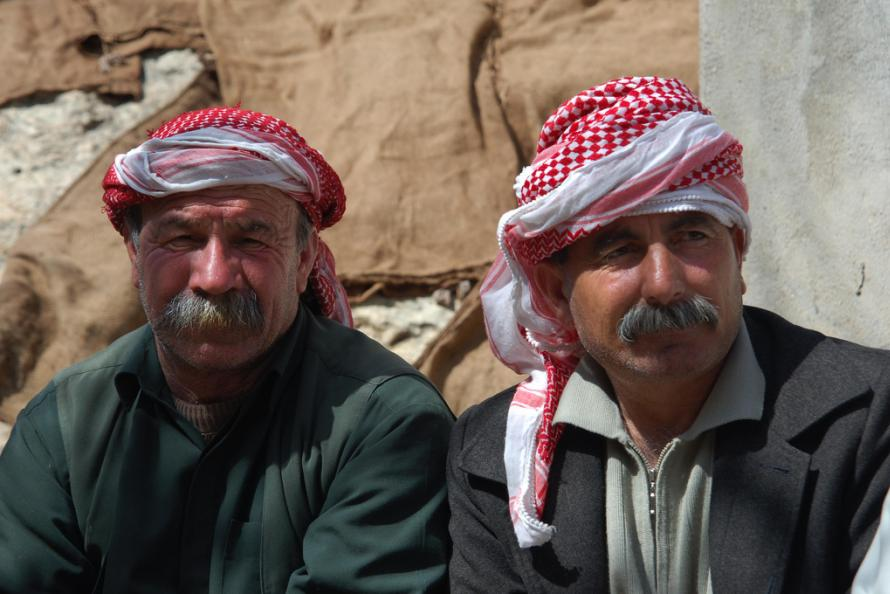
Yazidi men

The Yazidi population in Georgia has been dwindling since the 1990s, mostly due to economic migration to Russia and the West. According to a census carried out in 1989, there were over 30,000 Yazidis in Georgia; according to the 2002 census, however, only around 18,000 Yazidis remained in Georgia. However, by other estimates, the community fell from around 30,000 people to fewer than 5,000 during the 1990s. Today they number as little 6,000 by some estimates, including recent refugees from Sinjar in Iraq, who fled to Georgia following persecution by ISIL. On 16 June 2015, Yazidis celebrated the opening of the Sultan Ezid Temple and cultural centre, named after Sultan Ezid in Varketili, a suburb of Tbilisi. This is the third such temple in the world after those in Iraqi Kurdistan and Armenia.

=== Armenia ===
According to the 2011 census, there were 35,272 Yazidis in Armenia, making them Armenia's largest ethnic minority group. Ten years earlier, in the 2001 census, 40,620 Yazidis were registered in Armenia. They have a significant presence in the Armavir province of Armenia. Media have estimated the number of Yazidis in Armenia to be between 30,000 and 50,000. Most of them are the descendants of refugees who fled to Armenia in order to escape the persecution that they had previously suffered during Ottoman rule, including a wave occurring during the Armenian genocide, when many Armenians found refuge in Yazidi villages.

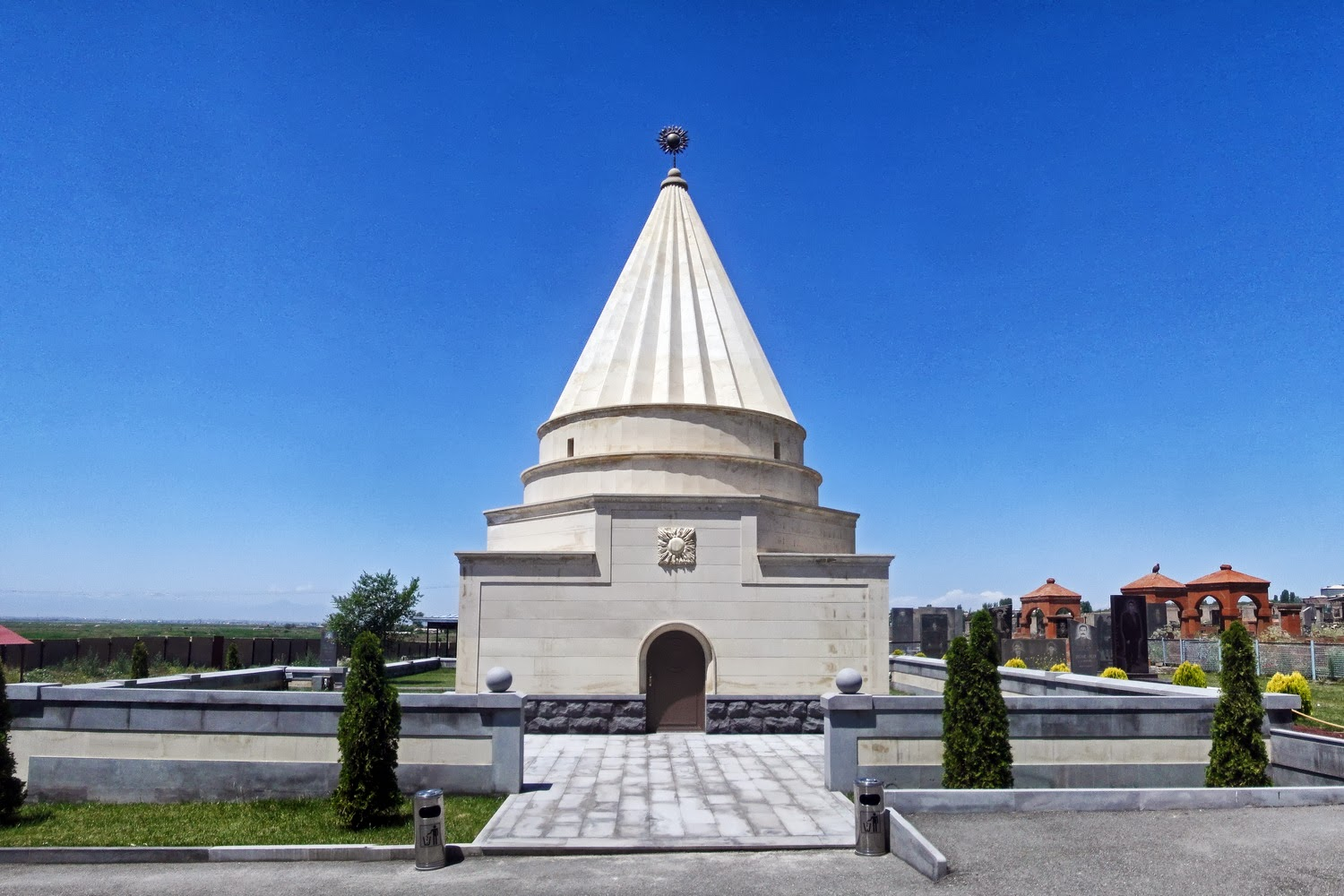
The Ziarat temple in Aknalich, Armenia

There is a Yazidi temple called Ziarat in the village of Aknalich in the region of Armavir. In September 2019, the largest Yazidi temple in the world called "Quba Mere Diwane", was opened in Aknalich, just a few meters from the Ziarat temple. The temple is privately funded by Mirza Sloian, a Yazidi businessman based in Moscow who is originally from the Armavir region.

=== Russia ===
In Russia, the largest population of Yazidis is concentrated in Moscow. There are also Yazidis living in Saint Petersburg. Outside these two major metropolitan areas, Adygea, Nizhny Novgorod Oblast, Sverdlovsk Oblast (capital: Yekaterinburg), and Novosibirsk Oblast each have between 3,500 and 10,000 Yazidis. Smaller Yazidi populations are also scattered throughout Russia.

=== Turkey ===
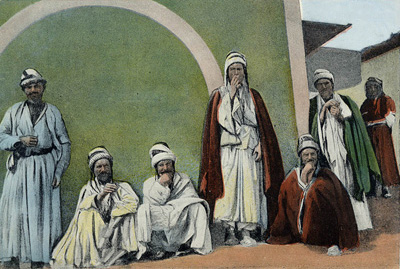
Yazidi men in Mardin, Turkey, late 19th century

A sizeable part of the autochthonous Yazidi population of Turkey fled the country for present-day Armenia and Georgia starting from the late 19th century. There are additional communities in Russia and Germany due to recent migration. The Yazidi community of Turkey declined precipitously during the 20th century. Most of them have immigrated to Europe, particularly Germany; those who remain reside primarily in villages in their former heartland of Tur Abdin.

=== Western Europe ===
This mass emigration has resulted in the establishment of large Yazidi diaspora communities abroad. The most significant of these is in Germany, which now has a Yazidi community of more than 230,000 living primarily in Hannover, Bielefeld, Celle, Bremen, Bad Oeynhausen, Pforzheim and Oldenburg. Most are from Turkey and, more recently, Iraq and live in the western states of North Rhine-Westphalia and Lower Saxony. Since 2008, Sweden has seen sizeable growth in its Yazidi emigrant community, which had grown to around 4,000 by 2010, and a smaller community exists in the Netherlands. Other Yazidi diaspora groups live in Belgium, Denmark, France, Switzerland, the United Kingdom, the United States, Canada and Australia; these have a total population of probably less than 5,000.

=== North America ===
A community of Yazidis have settled as refugees in the United States and Canada. Many Yazidis now live in Lincoln, Nebraska, and Houston, Texas. It is thought that Nebraska has the largest settlement (an estimated number of at least 10,000) of Yazidis in the United States, with a history of immigration to the state under refugee settlement programmes starting in the late 1990s. Many of the men of the community served as translators for the US military.

== Western perceptions ==
=== In Western literature ===
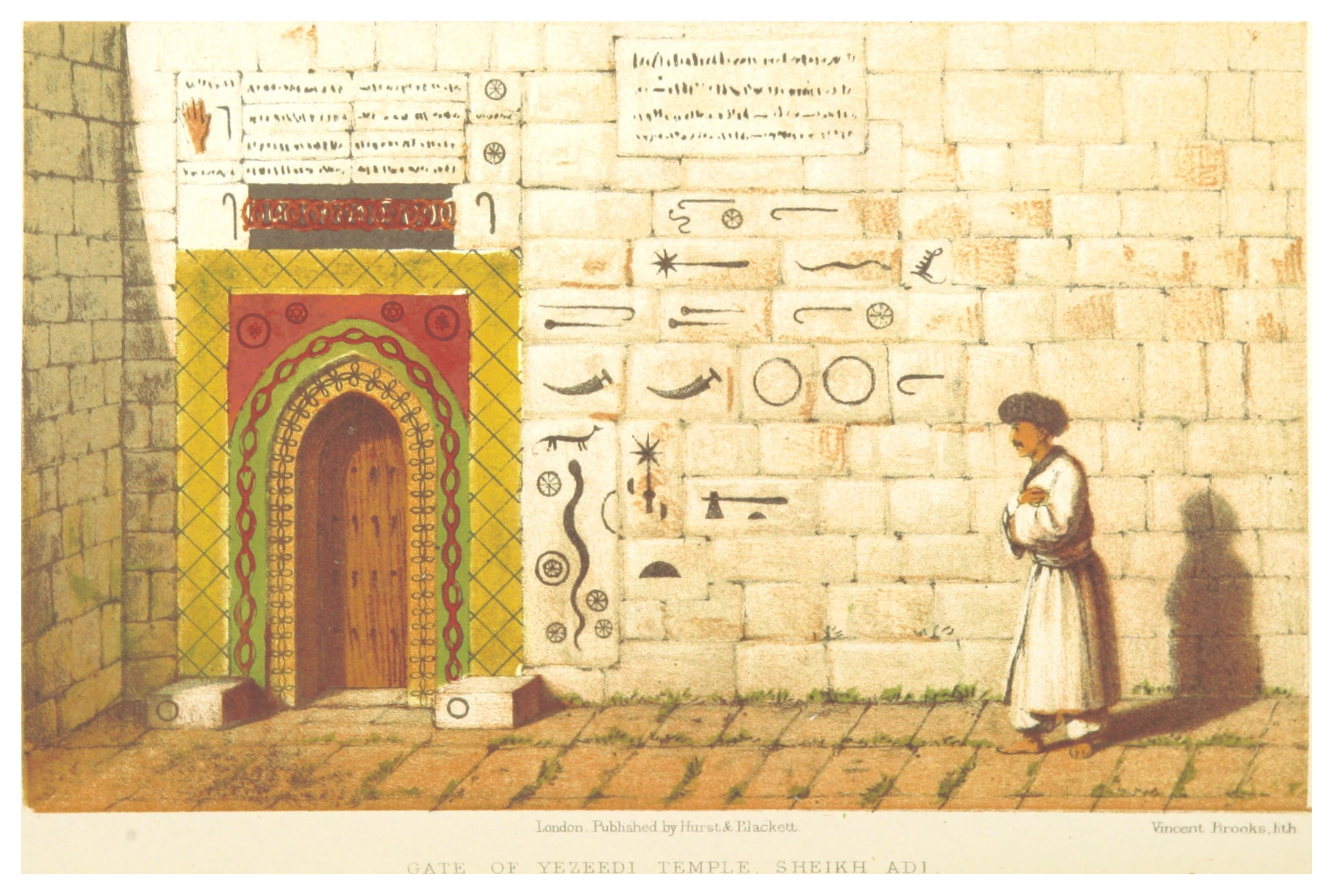
Image from A journey from London to Persepolis, 1865

In William Seabrook's book Adventures in Arabia, the fourth section, starting with Chapter 14, is devoted to the "Yezidees" and is titled "Among the Yezidees". He describes them as "a mysterious sect scattered throughout the Orient, strongest in North Arabia, feared and hated both by Moslem and Christian, because they are worshippers of Satan." In the three chapters of the book, he completely describes the area, including the fact that this territory, including their holiest city of Sheik-Adi, was not part of "Irak".

George Gurdjieff wrote about his encounters with the Yazidis several times in his book Meetings with Remarkable Men, mentioning that they are considered to be "devil worshippers" by other ethnicities in the region. Also, in Peter Ouspensky's book "In Search of the Miraculous", he describes some strange customs that Gurdjieff observed in Yazidi boys: "He told me, among other things, that when he was a child he had often observed how Yezidi boys were unable to step out of a circle traced round them on the ground" (p. 36)

Idries Shah, writing under the pen-name Arkon Daraul, in the 1961 book Secret Societies Yesterday and Today, describes discovering a Yazidi-influenced secret society in the London suburbs called the "Order of the Peacock Angel". Shah claimed Tawûsê Melek could be understood, from the Sufi viewpoint, as an allegory of the higher powers in humanity.

In H. P. Lovecraft's story "The Horror at Red Hook", some of the murderous foreigners are identified as belonging to "the Yezidi clan of devil-worshippers".

In Patrick O'Brian's Aubrey-Maturin series novel The Letter of Marque, set during the Napoleonic wars, there is a Yazidi character named Adi. His ethnicity is referred to as "Dasni".

A fictional Yazidi character of note is the super-powered police officer King Peacock of the Top 10 series (and related comics). He is portrayed as a kind, peaceful character with a broad knowledge of religion and mythology. He is depicted as conservative, ethical, and highly principled in family life. An incredibly powerful martial artist, he is able to perceive and strike at his opponent's weakest spots, a power that he claims is derived from communicating with Malek Ta'us.

Elif Shafak's 2024 novel There are Rivers in the Sky includes a Yazidi main character named Narin living in Turkey in 2014. The novel highlights Yazidi culture and addresses the persecution of the community.

==== United States military memoirs ====
In her memoir of her service with an intelligence unit of the US Army's 101st Airborne Division in Iraq during 2003 and 2004, Kayla Williams (2005) records being stationed in northern Iraq near the Syrian border in an area inhabited by "Yezidis". According to Williams, some Yazidis were Kurdish-speaking but did not consider themselves Kurds and expressed to her a fondness for America and Israel. She was able to learn only a little about the nature of their religion: she thought it very ancient, and concerned with angels. She describes a mountain-top Yazidi shrine as "a small rock building with objects dangling from the ceiling" and alcoves for the placement of offerings. She reported that local Muslims considered the Yazidis to be devil worshippers. (See § Persecution of Yazidis, below.)

In an October 2006 article in The New Republic, Lawrence F. Kaplan echoes Williams's sentiments about the enthusiasm of the Yazidis for the American occupation of Iraq, in part because the Americans protect them from oppression by militant Muslims and the nearby Kurds. Kaplan notes that the peace and calm of Sinjar is virtually unique in Iraq: "Parents and children line the streets when U.S. patrols pass by, while Yazidi clerics pray for the welfare of U.S. forces."

Tony Lagouranis comments on a Yazidi prisoner in his book Fear Up Harsh: An Army Interrogator's Dark Journey through Iraq:

There's a lot of mystery surrounding the Yazidi, and a lot of contradictory information. But I was drawn to this aspect of their beliefs: Yazidi don't have a Satan. Malak Ta'us, an archangel, God's favorite, was not thrown out of heaven the way Satan was. Instead, he descended, saw the suffering and pain of the world, and cried. His tears, thousands of years' worth, fell on the fires of hell, extinguishing them. If there is evil in the world, it does not come from a fallen angel or from the fires of hell. The evil in this world is man-made. Nevertheless, humans can, like Malak Ta'us, live in this world but still be good.

== Persecution of Yazidis ==
The Yazidi people have endured much systematic violence as they upheld their religion in the face of severe Islamic persecution and attempts to force them to convert to Islam and "Arabize" them by the Ottoman Empire, including the Yazidi genocide (1915) and later in the 20th century by Iraq.

The belief of some followers of other monotheistic religions of the region that the Peacock Angel equates with their own unredeemed evil spirit Satan, has incited centuries of persecution of the Yazidis as "devil worshippers".

=== After the 2003 invasion of Iraq ===
On 7 April 2007, a 17-year-old Iraqi of the Yazidi faith, Du'a Khalil Aswad, was stoned to death by her family. Rumours that the stoning was connected to her alleged conversion to Islam prompted reprisals against Yazidis, including a massacre in April 2007. In August 2007, some 500 Yazidis were killed in a coordinated series of bombings in Qahtaniya that became the deadliest suicide attack since the Iraq War began. In August 2009, at least 20 people were killed and 30 wounded in a double suicide bombing in northern Iraq, an Iraqi Interior Ministry official said. Two suicide bombers with explosive vests carried out the attack at a cafe in Sinjar, west of Mosul. In Sinjar, many townspeople are members of the Yazidi minority.

=== By the Islamic State ===
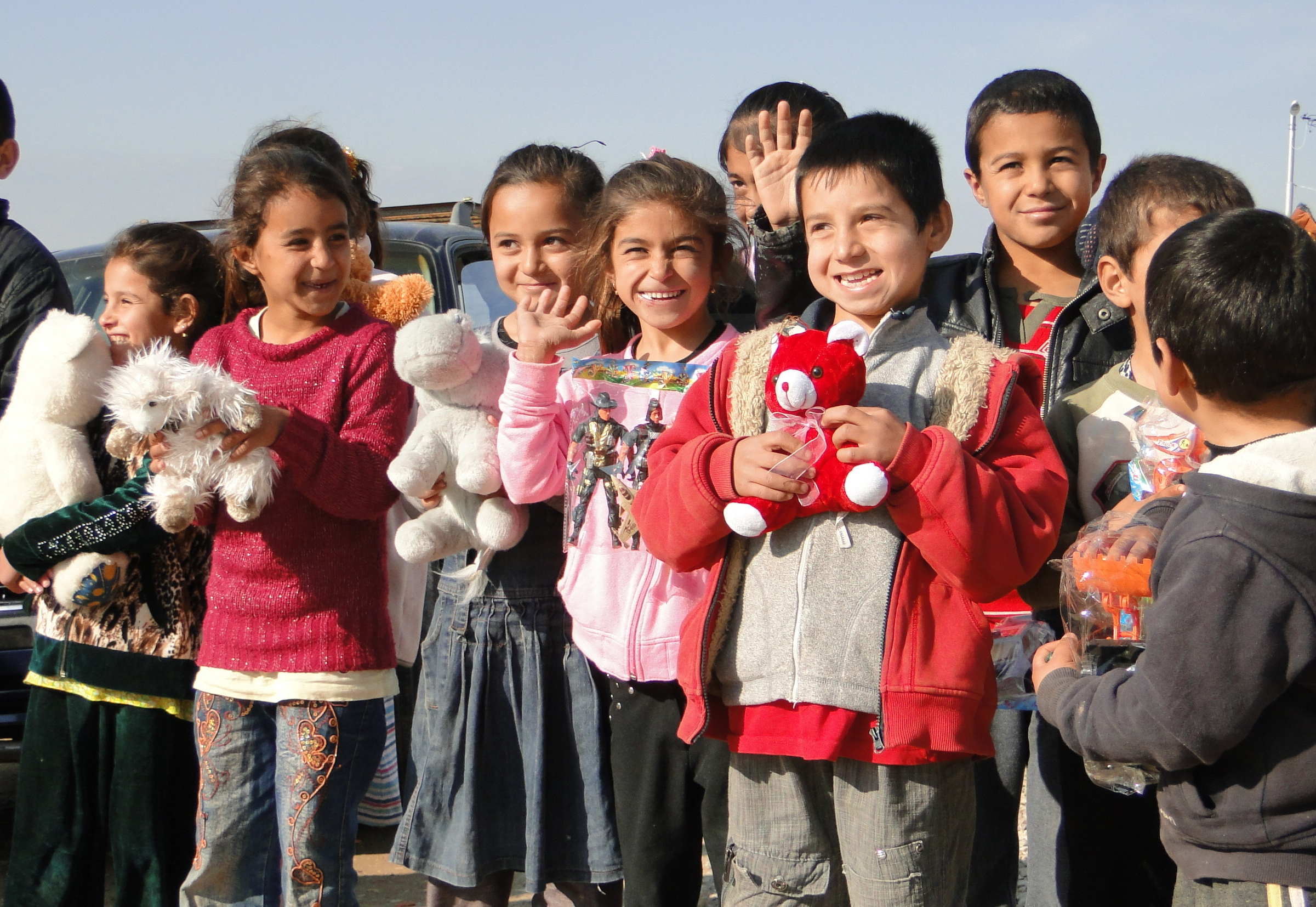
Defend International provided humanitarian aid to Yazidi refugees in Iraqi Kurdistan in December 2014.

In 2014, with the territorial gains of the Salafist militant group calling itself the Islamic State there was much upheaval in the Iraqi Yazidi population. Islamic State captured Sinjar in August 2014 following the withdrawal of Peshmerga troops of Masoud Barzani, forcing up to 50,000 Yazidis to flee into the nearby mountainous region. In early August, the town of Sinjar was nearly deserted as Kurdish Peshmerga forces were no longer able to keep ISIL forces from advancing. ISIL had previously declared the Yazidis to be devil worshippers. Most of the population fleeing Sinjar retreated by trekking up nearby mountains with the ultimate goal of reaching Dohuk in Iraqi Kurdistan (normally a five-hour drive by car). Concerns for the elderly and those of fragile health were expressed by the refugees, who told reporters of their lack of water. Reports coming from Sinjar stated that sick or elderly Yazidi who could not make the trek were being executed by ISIL. Yazidi parliamentarian Haji Ghandour told reporters that "In our history, we have suffered 72 massacres. We are worried Sinjar could be a 73rd."

UN groups say at least 40,000 members of the Yazidi sect, many of them women and children, took refuge in nine locations on Mount Sinjar, a craggy, 1,400 m (4,600 ft) high ridge identified in local legend as the final resting place of Noah's Ark, facing slaughter at the hands of jihadists surrounding them below if they fled, or death by dehydration if they stayed. Between 20,000 and 30,000 Yazidis, most of them women and children, besieged by ISIL, escaped from the mountain after the People's Protection Units (YPG) and Kurdistan Workers' Party (PKK) intervened to stop ISIL and opened a humanitarian corridor for them, helping them cross the Tigris into Rojava. Some Yazidis were later escorted back to Iraqi Kurdistan by Peshmerga and YPG forces, Kurdish officials have said.

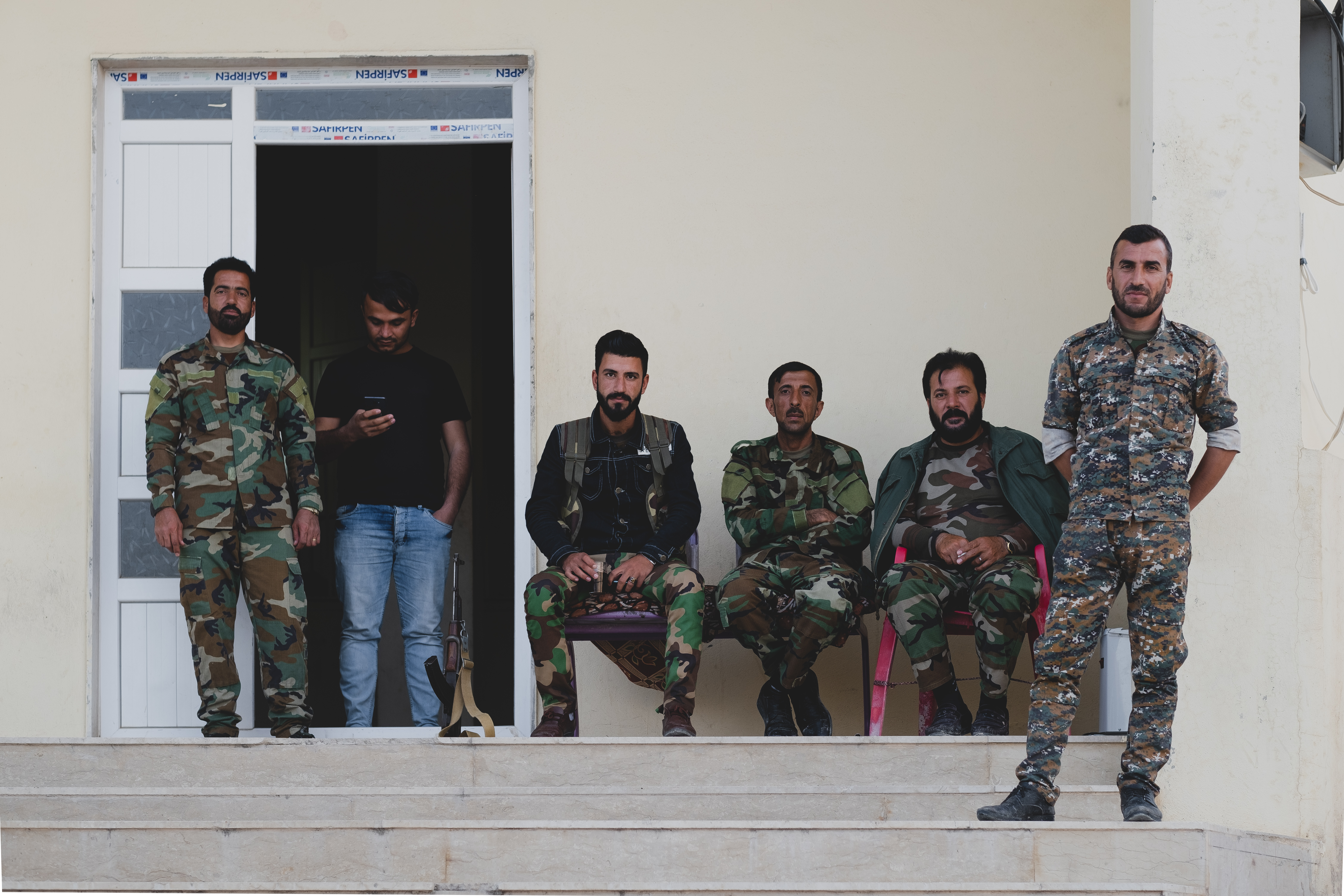
Yazidi Peshmerga at the shrine of Sharaf ad-Din in the Sinjar Mountains, 2019

Captured women were treated as sex slaves or spoils of war; some were driven to suicide. Women and girls who converted to Islam were sold as brides; those who refuse to convert were tortured, raped and eventually murdered. Babies born in the prison where the women are held were taken from their mothers to an unknown fate. Nadia Murad, a Yazidi human rights activist and 2018 Nobel Peace Prize winner, was kidnapped and used as a sex slave by the ISIL in 2014. In October 2014, the United Nations reported that more than 5,000 Yazidis had been murdered and 5,000 to 7,000 (mostly women and children) had been abducted by ISIL. ISIS has, in their digital magazine Dabiq, explicitly claimed religious justification for enslaving Yazidi women. In December 2014, Amnesty International published a report. Despite the oppression Yazidi women sustained, they appeared on the news as examples of retaliation. They received training and taken positions at the frontlines of the fighting, making up about a third of the Kurd–Yazidi coalition forces, and distinguished themselves as soldiers.

== See also ==
- Index of articles related to the Yazidis
- List of Yazidi holy places
- List of Yazidi holy figures
- List of Yazidi organizations
- List of Yazidi people
- Religion in Kurdistan
- Yazidi literature
- Yazidi social organization

== Sources ==
- Açıkyıldız, Birgül (2014). The Yezidis: The History of a Community, Culture and Religion. London: I.B. Tauris & Company. ISBN 978-1-784-53216-1. OCLC 888467694.
- Guest, John S. (1993). Survival Among The Kurds: A History of the Yezidis. Kegan Paul International. ISBN 978-0-7103-0456-8. OCLC 823379895.
- Henning, Barbara (2018). Narratives of the History of the Ottoman-Kurdish Bedirhani Family in Imperial and Post-Imperial Contexts: Continuities and Changes. University of Bamberg Press. p. 111. ISBN 978-3-86309-551-2.
- Kreyenbroek, Philip G. (1995). Yezidism—Its Background, Observances, and Textual Tradition. Texts and Studies in Religion 62 (in Kurdish and English). Lewiston, Queenston and Lampeter, NY: Edwin Mellen Press. ISBN 978-0-773-49004-8. OCLC 31377794.
- Pirbari, Dimitri; Grigoriev, Stanislav (2013). Holy Lalish, 2008 (Ezidian temple Lalish in Iraqi Kurdistan).
