= Bashiqa =

Bashiqa بعشيقة
- Town
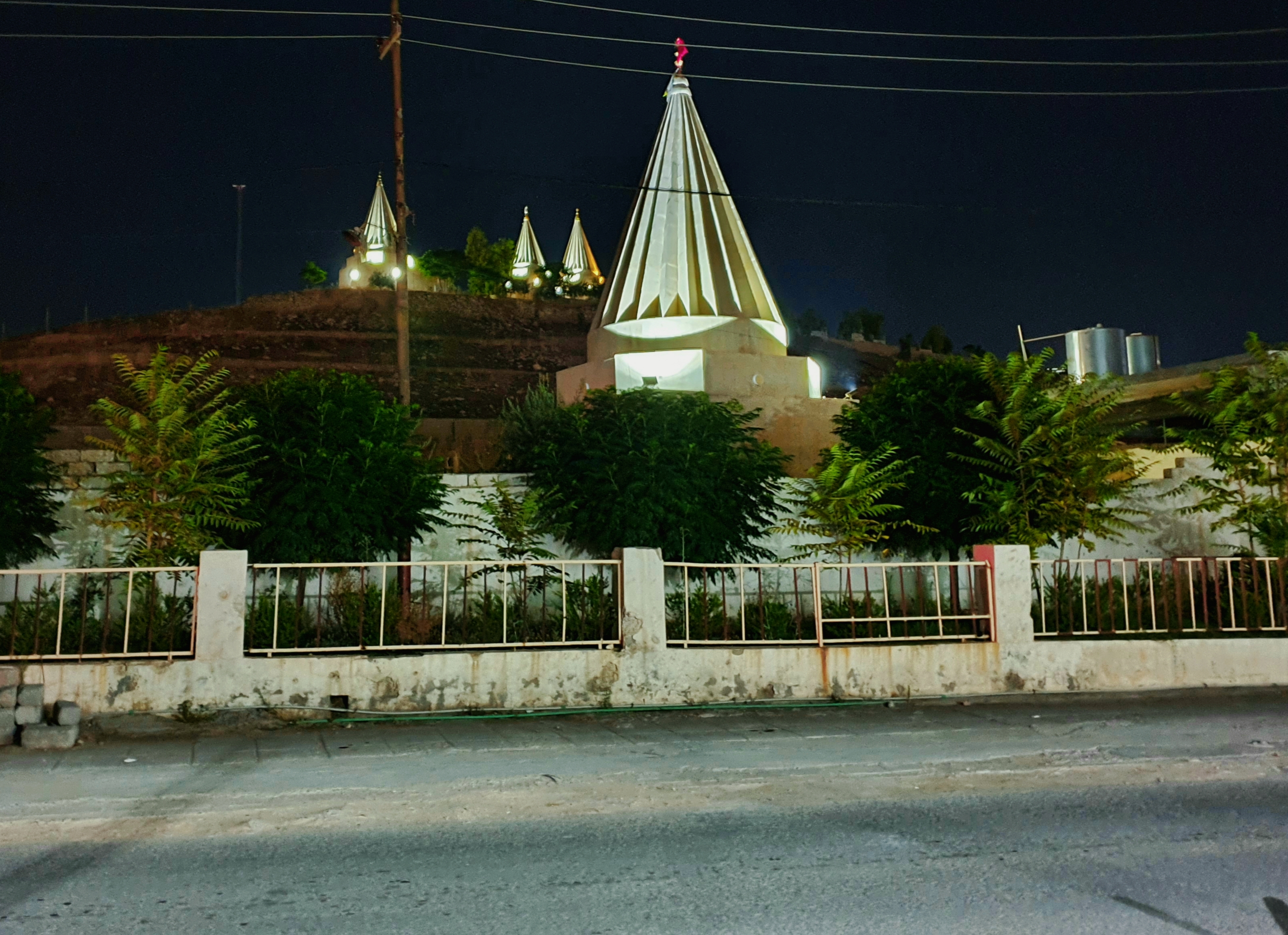
- Yazidi shrine in Bashiqa

- Location in Iraq
- Coordinates: 36.4466°N 43.3471°E
- Country: Iraq
- Governorate: Nineveh
- District: Al-Hamdaniya District

Bashiqa (Arabic: بعشيقة, romanized: Ba'shīqah; Kurdish: بەعشیقە, romanized: Başîqa; Syriac: ܒܥܫܝܩܐ) is a town situated at the heart of the Nineveh Plain, between Mosul and Sheikhan, on the edges of Mount Maqlub. The inhabitants of the town are predominantly Yazidis.

The urban area of Bashiqa and Bahzani had the third largest Yazidi population in Iraq prior to the Yazidi genocide. Whilst Bahzani contains older buildings with numerous ancient sites, Bashiqa is more modern and consists mainly of newer infrastructure and architecture. Between 2014 and 2016, ISIS destroyed 22 Yazidi mausoleums that were located in Bashiqa and Bahzani, the Yazidi libraries were demolished and the famous sacred olive grove in Bahzani was burnt.

Around 85% of the population is Yazidi in 2021. The remaining 15% are 390 ethnic Christian Assyrians which include around 300 Syriac Orthodox families and 90 Syriac Catholic families.

== Population ==
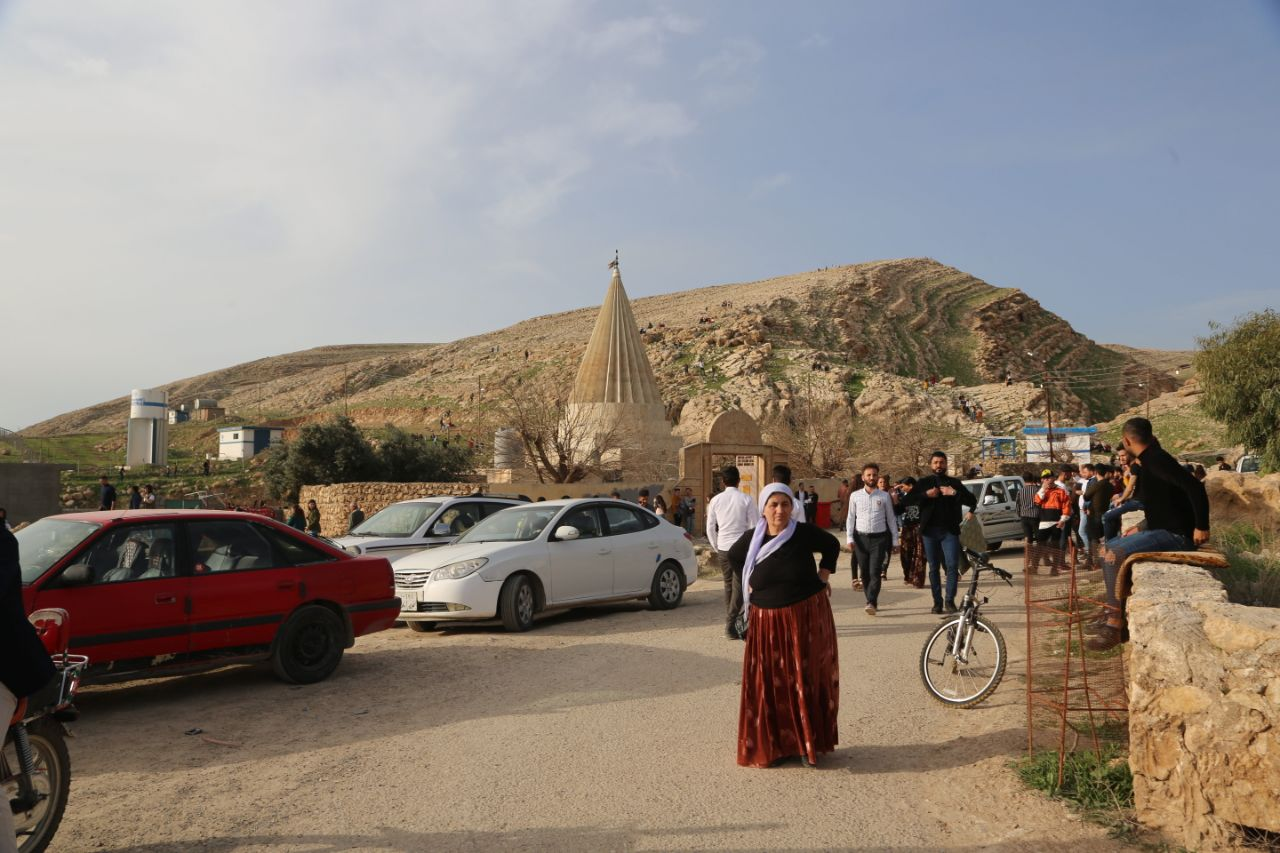
Yazidis in Bashiqa

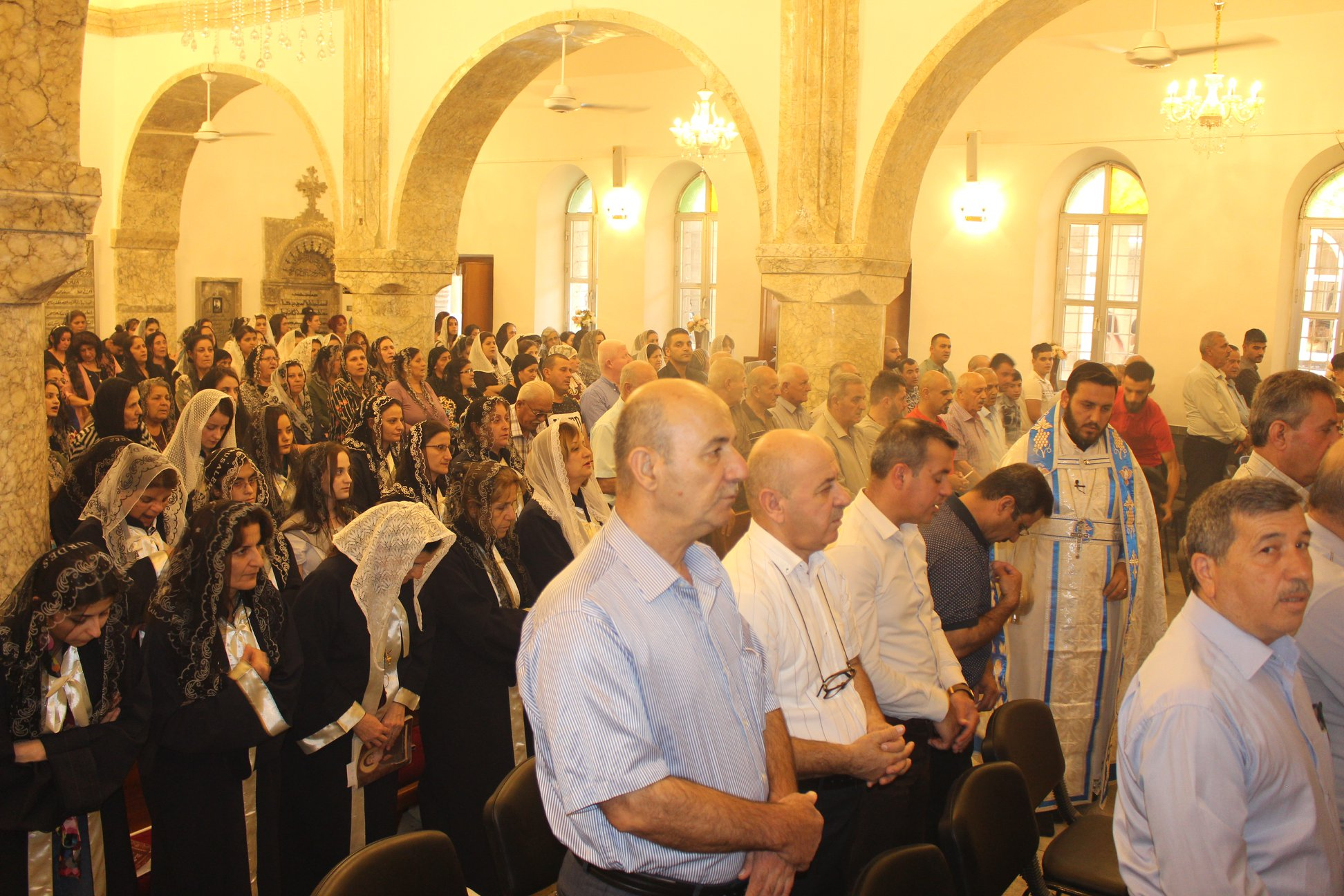
Syriac Orthodox Christians from Bashiq

Before ISIS invaded the Nineveh plain, there were 35,000 Yezidis living in the Bashiqa and Bahzani twin-villages. They made up approximately 85% of the total population. The remainder was composed of around 12% Christians and 3% Muslims. The lightning progression of ISIS in 2014 forced the inhabitants to flee the area on the night of the 6 and 7 August. The area was liberated on 7 November 2016 and the inhabitants began to return, in 2018 around 27,000 Yezidis had returned, approximately 77% of the pre-ISIS Yazidi population. A further 735 Yezidis displaced who were displaced from Sinjar and were studying in Mosul are presently living here in IDP camps. 525 of the houses suffered damages by ISIS and 200 of them were totally destroyed.

Bashiqa is surrounded by farms of olives all around the town and there is a small mountain to the north. Bashiqa is famous for its olive trees, Rakı (arak), olive oil, and soap. It is also famous for its onion, pickles. It used to be a tourist destination for the locals in Mosul and Iraqis in general. The Yazidis in Bashiqa and its twin village Bahzani speak Arabic as their mother language. however, the now Arabic-speaking tribes in Bashiqa and Bahzani, including Xaltî, Dumilî and Hekarî, have historically been classified as Kurdish tribes.

== History ==
Although Bashiqa and Bahzani are considered to have already been known to Yezidis as early as 12th century, it seems that it only became part of the Yezidi territory in the 13th century. This is strengthened by the fact that the majority of the mausoleums present here are dedicated to the second generation members of the Shamsani family, whom lived in the second half of the 12th century.

In the mid-1800s, Dr. Asahel Grant visited Bashiqa, which was largely inhabited by Yezidis or "Desani". He took notes on their spiritual practices and beliefs.

Bashiqa is controlled by the Iraqi federal government but claimed by the Kurdistan Region since the fall of Saddam Hussein in 2003. According to Article 140 of the Iraqi constitution, a referendum should decide whether it should continue to be managed by the central government or the KRG. The status of the city is still not fully understood. According to reports by Human Rights Watch (2011), UNHCR (2007) and other human rights organizations the townspeople are forced and threatened with violence if they should not vote for inclusion of the city in the Kurdistan Region.

In the 13th century, historian, Yaqut al-Hamawi described Bashiqa as a village on the outskirts of Nineveh to the east of the river Tigris which is well known for its olive trees and having a majority Christian population.

Bashiqa is the birthplace of the famed Ezidi Mirza, a 17th century Yezidi leader who became the governor of Mosul and is mentioned in Yezidi sagas and stories until today for his heroic military achievements against the hostile neighbouring Muslim tribes.

In the town square of Bashiqa, Du'a Khalil Aswad, a young woman from the Yazidi community who wanted to marry a Muslim, was stoned to death in 2007 by a large crowd of men in an "honor killing". As a revenge on the 22 April 2007, Muslim militants stopped a bus in Mosul and killed 23 Yazidis from Bashiqa.

In 2012, car bombs went off in the town.

In June 2014, ISIL militants took over the city, and changed the name to Du'a city naming it after Du'a Khalil Aswad. Yazidi civilians fled the city in 2014. The region had seen fighting between ISIL and Kurdish Peshmerga forces, but remained under ISIL control throughout 2015 and most of 2016.

Turkish soldiers were deployed in a training mission in the Mosul District in 2015, without authorization of Baghdad, but with permission of Iraqi Kurdistan.

On 7 November 2016, during the Battle of Mosul, Kurdish Peshmerga fighters launched a massive offensive to liberate the town from ISIL control. Peshmerga had surrounded the town for two weeks. There were believed to be 100 to 200 ISIL militants left. Commander Kaka Hama said the Peshmerga descended from three fronts, and that coalition airstrikes played a large role in the assault. In the early afternoon, it was reported that Bashiqa was liberated and that the Peshmerga were in full control.

== Yazidi holy sites ==
Bashiqa and Bahzani has numerous Yazidi shrines, including:

1. Şêxûbekir
2. Şêx Xefir
3. Şêx Mend Paşa
4. Pîr Bûb
5. Seîd û Mesûd
6. Şêx Zeynedîn
7. Mîr Sicadîn
8. Şêx Şems
9. Şêx Babik
10. Şêx Mihemed
11. Sitt Habîbî
12. Sitt Hecîcî
13. Melekê Mîran Sadiq
14. Şêx Nasirdîn
15. Şêx Abd el-Ezîz
16. Şêx Şerfedîn

== See also ==
- Assyrians in Iraq
- Yazidis in Iraq
