= Rise of the Soran Emirate =

The Rise of the Soran Emirate, also called the Rise of Muhammad Pasha of Rawanduz began after Mir Muhammad's consolidation of power in 1813, in 1832 he expanded into neighbouring Kurdish emirates and subjugated numerous tribes. His forces also massacred thousands of Yazidis in the process, an estimated 70,000 to 135,000 Yazidis were killed. From there he expanded into parts of Turkish Kurdistan and In 1834, Ottoman forces launched an final offensive of the first campaign against Soran but were repelled. Following this, in 1835 he expanded into Iranian Kurdistan (then under Qajar Iran). His forces also advanced into the borders of Southern Azerbaijan seizing the city of Qotur.

== Rise and expansion ==
In 1831, Mir Muhammad inherited the Soran Emirate from his father, Ibrahim. Accounts differ over how Muhammad assumed power. Some state that his aged father voluntarily retired realising he cannot manage the Emirate, while others claim that Muhammad forced him to relinquish the throne. After his accession, Muhammad moved against suspected opponents, including members of his own family.

The early stages of Soran's territorial expansion relied on Prince Muhammad's use of fighters from the Kurdish tribal groups; Surchi, Khoshnaw, Zirari. He later recruited other Kurdish tribes, including the Tayis. The prince also extended recruitment to both tribal and non-tribal Kurds, including peasants. The Scottish traveller, James Baillie Fraser, estimated his forces at 25,000 fighters, according to Dr Ross, who had personally visited the camp. They were paid regular wages in return for military service. In addition to the Kurds some Arab tribes joined Mir Muhammad's side. Inspired by Muhammad Ali of Egypt, Mir Muhammad established arms factories in Rawanduz that produced rifles, ammunition and cannons. More than 200 cannons were reportedly manufactured, some of which survived in Rawanduz and the Baghdad Museum.

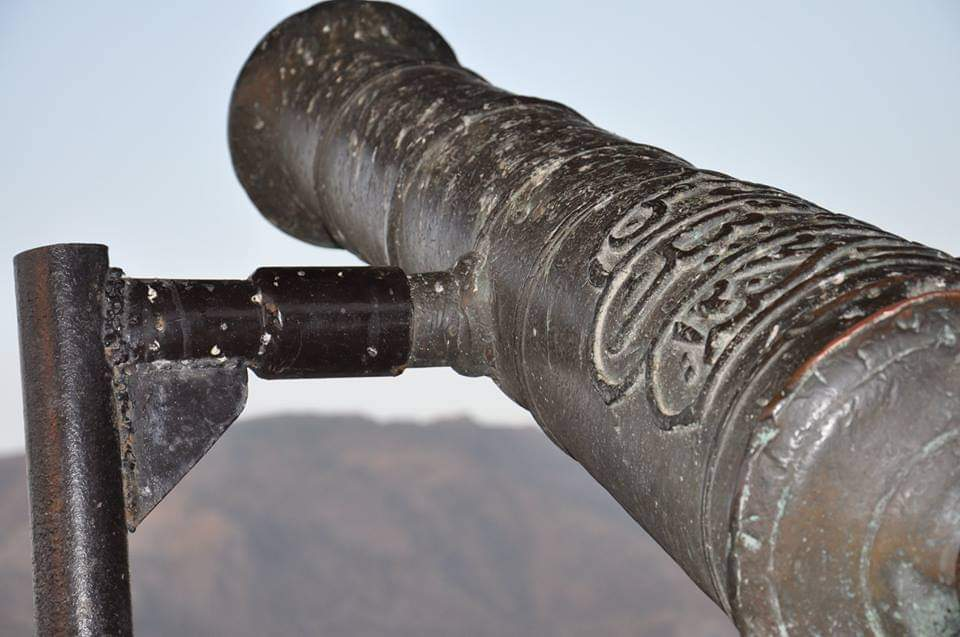
A surviving cannon from the Mir Muhammad period

The Mir also sent ambassadors to the Kurds of Iran, requesting for support in his cause.

In the early 1820s, he expanded his control south towards the Little Zab River and further north. He removed the governors of the declining Emirates of Baban and Hakkari and captured the cities of Erbil and Koy Sanjaq. By the mid-1820s, he had established his authority over the Emirate of Hakkari and the Bradost, Surch, and Mamash tribes.

Mir Muhammad continued expanding his territory and captured Erbil. He informed Ali Riza Pasha, the governor of Baghdad, and requested permission to incorporate the city into his territory. Ali Riza agreed, partly because Mir Muhammad had shown submission to Ottoman authority and sent him gifts and money.

In 1831, forces led by Mir Muhammad against Bahdinan captured the city and deposed the ruler Mohammad Said Pasha. The siege took place following the capture of Aqrah another city under Bahdinan. The city was naturally fortified by steep cliffs and had long been regarded as one of the most defensible positions in the region. Accounts indicate that Mir Muhammad's forces surrounded the city and initiated a siege designed to force surrender. He overthrew Mir Said, installing a Bahdinani puppet in his stead. He also acquired Zakho and Duhok. The Jewish population was affected by violence and looting. They “were treated with merciless cruelty and oppression." Many were forced to migrate and some fled the city after its fall. Similar reports are mentioned for other towns under his control, including Ranya, Khoy, Erbil, Aqra, and Zakho. Following the defeat of Mir Muhammad, Amadiya came under the rule of the Ottoman governor of Mosul. The situation of the Jewish community improved slightly. Said Pasha later retook the city but failed and Mir Muhammad killed most of the rebellions leaders. A large portion of the population perished from starvation and disease. Most of its leading population was also put to the sword, Mir Muhammad then formally annexed Bahdinan to Rawanduz effectively eliminating all Bahdini Mirs. The Ottoman authorities were aware of what was happening but had in-sufficient local forces to deal with Mir Muhammad. They had been preoccupied with Ibrahim Pasha's seizure of Syria and invasion of Anatolia and feared that Mir Muhammad was actually in touch with Egyptian forces. Under pressure from Ibrahim Pasha and Iranian forces, the pasha of Baghdad initially accepted the Mir's rise to power as a fait accompli and awarded him the title of pasha. This peace ended when the Mir dispatched troops towards Nusaybin and Mardin further north, captured Cizre. His territorial ambitions also provoked opposition among the local population. For example, the notables of Amadiyah submitted a formal complaint about his zulm (oppression) to Mehmed Resid Pasha, the former grand vizier and governor of Sivas, who held supreme authority over the region.

In 1832, Mir Muhammad waged a holy war against the Yazidis. Estimates suggest that between 70,000 to 135,000 Yazidis were killed.

During this, Kurdish troops descended on Alqosh and massacred its citizens, some sources claim they had the impression that their victims were Yezidis. Christian estimates of the death toll ranged from 272 to 367 dead. Seven priests were among the dead, and the patriarchal Vicar Hnanisho was killed in church while officiating at a service. The most important victim, was Gabriel Dambo. The tomb of Prophet Nahum was destroyed. Joseph Audo, was stripped and insulted, but was eventually able to persuade the Kurdish leader to halt the massacre, insisting that he and his fellow-victims were law-abiding 'Syrians', not Yezidis. Most of its inhabitants who had escaped death, were stripped of their clothes and babies were abandoned as they had been born to their mothers, they also tortured them and did other shameful acts.

By May 1833, his forces; reportedly comprising 10,000 cavalry and 20,000 trained infantry, he brought the whole of southern Kurdistan under his control by this point and reached the borders of the Bohtan principality. Concerned by his expansion, the Ottoman sultan dispatched Reshid Pasha, supported by troops from Mosul and Baghdad, to reassert Ottoman authority. In the summer of 1834, the newly formed Ottoman army under the command of Reshid Pasha advanced into northern Kurdistan, crushing the rebellious tribes along its route. As it approached the Soran district, the centre of Muhammad Pasha of Rawanduz's power, it joined forces with Ottoman troops arriving from Mosul and Baghdad. Despite their overwhelming numbered superiority, the attack was repelled, forcing them to withdraw because Kurdish forces controlled all the mountain passes. The Ottoman forces were left exhausted.

The Mir attempted to subdue the Assyrians of Lower Tyari in 1834 but suffered a defeat near the village of Lezan. Following the Ottoman defeat, in October 1835, Mir Muhammad, taking advantage of the respite, turned his attention to Iranian Kurdistan and conquered it “from end to end”, taking territory as far as the borders of southern Azerbaijan. During his conquests in parts of southern Azerbaijan, Kurdish battalions led by Muhammad Pasha raided and occupied the region of Qotur, crushing an Iranian force sent against them from Khoy and fortifying themselves in the occupied areas. At the same time, the Emir of Rawanduz led a large force and raided Iranian possessions around Salduz, plundering dozens of villages. According to Gerard Chailand the Kurdish inhabitants welcomed his forces as liberators. After failing to stop the Kurdish advance, Persia sought military assistance from the Russian Empire.

== Aftermath ==
In late 1836, Mir Muhammad surrendered to Rashid Pasha. British diplomat Richard Wood was involved in the negotiations, though Eppel writes that Wood may have exaggerated his role in persuading Mir Muhammad to surrender. According to one account, Rashid Pasha persuaded several Kurdish religious dignitaries, including Mir Muhammad's own mufti, Mulla Muhammad Khati, who reportedly issued a fatwa declaring those who fought against the caliph's army unbelievers and that their marriages were thereby dissolved. This pronouncement reportedly demoralised Muhammad's forces, prompting many soldiers to abandon the struggle.

== See also ==
- Rise of the Ottoman Empire
