= Genocide of Yezidis by the Soran Emirate (1832–1834) =

Genocidal campaign in the Ottoman Empire

- Part of the Mir Muhammad Rebellion
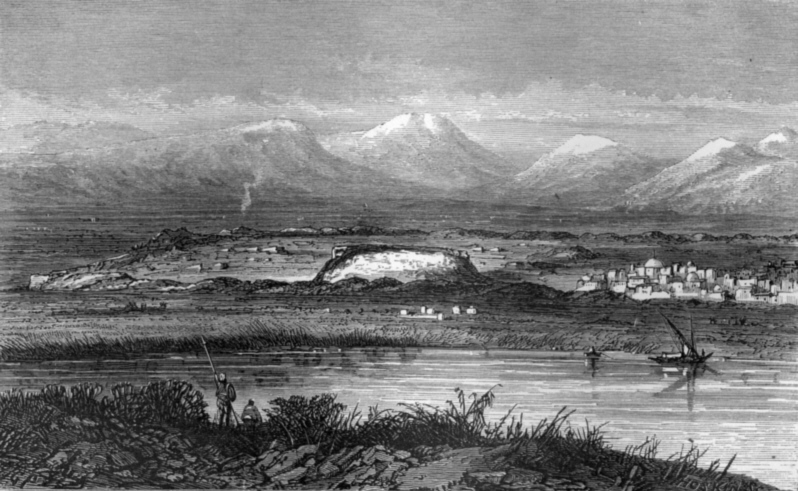
- Kuyunjiq mound near Mosul. The site acquired its name "shambles of the sheep" following the massacre of thousands of Yazidi refugees here in 1832.
- Native name: Firmana Mîrê Kore
- Location: Shekhan, Sinjar and Erbil, Ottoman Empire (present-day Iraq)
- Date: March 1832–1834
- Target: Yazidis
- Attack type: Genocide, mass enslavement, forced conversion to Islam, Genocidal rape, looting
- Deaths: Thousands (estimated between 70,000 to 135,000), only ~5% of the targeted population survived according to Sadiq al-Damaluji
- Victims: ~10,000 enslaved (mostly women and children)
- Perpetrator: Soran Emirate
- Defenders: Sheikhan principality, Bahdinan Emirate
- Motive: Islamic extremism (fatwa against Yazidis as infidels), territorial expansion

The Genocide of Yezidis by the Soran Emirate, (Note: Alternatively known as the Soran massacre.) also known in Yazidi tradition as the Firman of Mir-i-Kura ("The Firman of the One-Eyed Prince"), was a genocidal campaign by the Sunni Kurdish emir Mir Muhammad of Rawanduz against the Yazidis of the Sheikhan, Sinjar and Erbil regions in present-day northern Iraq between March 1832 and 1834. Triggered by religious fatwas declaring the Yazidis as infidels and fueled by intertribal conflict, the campaign resulted in mass killing, enslavement, and forced conversion across Yazidi settlements. It is considered the bloodiest event in recorded Yazidi history. An estimated 70,000 to 135,000 Yazidis were killed. Sadiq al-Damlouji puts the number of survivors of the genocide at about 5% of the targeted population.

== Background ==
The decades preceding the genocidal campaign by Mir Muhammad of Rawanduz were marked by escalating hostility between the Yazidis and the Mizuri tribe. In 1724, the Mizuri cleric Sheikh Abd-Allah Rabbatki (1650–1746) issued a fatwa declaring the Yazidis infidels and apostates from Islam, stipulating that killing them was a religious duty and that their property and women were legitimate spoils of war. In 1802, the Algushiyya clan, a branch of the Mizuri tribe, attacked the Yazidi village of Ghabara in the western Shekhan region, killed approximately one hundred Yazidis, and occupied the Lalish temple for eight months. In 1804, when the Mizuri tribe invaded Amedi, they seized the family of the Bahdinan emir Qubad Pasha, imprisoned him and his brother, and plundered the city. Yazidi forces of the Dina tribe responded to the Bahdinan emir Ahmed Pasha's appeal for assistance, expelled the Mizuri from Amedi, and restored order.

Mir Ali Beg I, son of Mir Hasan Beg, ruled as Mir of Shekhan from approximately 1809 to 1833. The administrative center of the principality and his residence was the village of Baadre. Upon inheriting the throne, Ali Beg cultivated close ties with neighboring Kurdish emirs while maintaining the principality's vassal relationship with the emirate of Bahdinan. The Yazidis depended on this alliance as a degree of protection against hostile Muslim Kurdish tribes who carried out attacks on Yazidi communities under religious pretexts.

Tensions between Ali Beg and the Mizuri leader Ali Agha al-Ballatayyi provided the context for a political assassination that would have catastrophic consequences for the Yazidi community. After the death of the Bahdinan prince Zubayr Pasha in 1824, Bahdinan was in conflict with its own tribal leaders, and some of its princes sought allies among the Yazidis against the Mizuri. Muhammad Sa'id Pasha of Bahdinan, seeking to assassinate Ballatayyi and curtail Mizuri influence, recruited Ali Beg to carry out the killing.

Ali Beg agreed to kill Balatayyi only after being assured that the Yazidis would be protected from reprisals. One source states that the Bahdinan emir threatened to kill Ali Beg's entire family if he refused to cooperate. The Mizuri used to attack Yazidi villages in Sheikhan and take taxes from them by force, which was one reason for Ali Beg's agreement to the Bahdinan prince's plan.

Sa'id Pasha arranged a staged reconciliation between the two leaders, with his brother Isma'il Pasha, governor of Akre, serving as mediator. As part of the arrangement, Ali Beg visited Ballatayyi at his village of Ballata, after which he invited Ballatayyi to visit his own village of Baadre to complete the reconciliation. Ballatayyi accepted the invitation. In 1832, while traveling to Baadre, Ballatayyi and his son were ambushed and killed by Ali Beg, who had devised the plan together with Muhammad Sa'id Pasha. Two of Ballatayyi's own bodyguards also participated in the plot against him.

Upon learning of the assassination of their chieftain Ali Agha al-Ballatayyi, the Mizuri tribesmen reacted with fury and began mobilizing for a large-scale retaliatory raid against Baadre, the seat of the Yazidi prince. In anticipation of the attack, thousands of Yazidi warriors gathered at their prince's residence. Open conflict was narrowly averted when the Pasha of Amedi emir of the Bahdinan Emirate and overlord of both the Mizuri tribe and the Yazidis, made known his opposition to the raid. Fearing that defying so powerful a ruler, who was himself suspected of complicity in the murder, might turn his forces against them, the Mizuris stood down.

Ballatayyi's nephew, the influential cleric Mulla Yahya Mizuri (1772–1839), sought redress from Sa'id Pasha and his brother Ismail Pasha but was rebuffed, with his son subsequently killed by the Bahdinan emirs. Mulla Yahya Mizuri then turned to Mir Muhammad of Rawanduz, ruler of the Soran Emirate, issuing a fatwa blessing retaliatory action and authorizing fighting against the Bahdinan emirs should they support the Yazidis. Mir Muhammad of Rawanduz requested that his mufti Mulla Muḥammad Khatt-i issue a fatwa legitimizing the seizure of Yazidi blood and property.

By the early nineteenth century, Mir Muhammad of Rawanduz had consolidated his rule over the Soran Emirate and transformed it into one of the strongest Kurdish principalities in the region. After succeeding his father around 1813–1814, he expanded into neighboring territories including Erbil, Koya, Ranya, Harir and Makhmur, while weakening the rival Baban emirate. Modern historians regard these campaigns as laying the foundation for his subsequent expansion into Bahdinan.

Mir Muhammad of Rawanduz had, by this point, annexed several neighboring Kurdish emirates, declared independence from the Ottoman Empire at a moment when the Ottoman sultan was preoccupied with Muhammad Ali's rebellion in Egypt, and was minting his own coins. He accepted the appeal and launched a large-scale military campaign. Contemporary travelers described Mir Muhammad of Rawanduz as a religious extremist who also sought to control the economic resources of the Yazidis of eastern Mosul and force their conversion. Scholars have noted that material ambition and the use of religious sanction as legitimizing cover may have been equally significant motivations.

== The campaign ==
Mir Muhammad of Rawanduz assembled a military force estimated by historians at between 40,000 and 50,000 fighters, dividing it into two groups: one under his own command and one under his brother Rasul Beg. In early March 1832, these forces crossed the Great Zab and entered the Yazidi border village of Kallak-a-Dasiniyya, killing many of its inhabitants. The village of Kallak, near Erbil, marked the border between Yazidi territory and the Soran emirate until the nineteenth century. Tensions between the two had existed since the reign of Suleiman the Magnificent, who in 1534 ordered the assassination of the Soran emir Izzeddin Shir and authorized the Yazidi ruler Husayn Beg to govern the Soran emirate in his place. Advancing village by village through Yazidi territory, Mir Muhammad of Rawanduz's forces killed all males who fell into their hands, whether men or older boys. Musa Beg, the brother of the Bahdinan emir Said Beg, joined the Sorani campaign against his own brother, further undermining Bahdinan resistance.

Mir Muhammad of Rawanduz's forces proceeded to Shekhan, being joined by forces led by Bedir Khan Beg. The Soran forces seized the village of Khatarah, approximately 45 kilometers north of Mosul, and then the town of Alqosh, where they were met by a joint force of Yazidis and Bahdinan troops led by Yusuf Abdo, a Bahdinan commander from Amedi, and Baba Hurmuz, head of the Christian monastery of Alqosh. These combined forces withdrew toward Baadre, the residence of Ali Beg. Ali Beg sought to negotiate, but Mir Muhammad of Rawanduz, under the advice of Mulla Yahya Mizuri and Mulla Muḥammad Khatt-i, rejected any possibility of reconciliation. The Sorani forces defeated the combined Yazidi and Bahdinan resistance at Shekhan, committing massacres that included the killing of the elderly and young, rape, and enslavement. According to one account, Mir Muhammad of Rawanduz lost an eye during fighting with Yazidi forces, earning him the epithet Mire Kora, meaning the Blind Emir.

The fleeing Yazidi population sought refuge in Mosul, but the city's governor ordered the bridge burned to prevent Mir Muhammad of Rawanduz's forces from crossing, inadvertently trapping the Yazidis on the far bank, where they were overtaken by pursuing troops and massacred. The English missionary and orientalist George Percy Badger recorded that in 1832 Mir Muhammad of Rawanduz's forces burned Yazidi villages, carried many captives away, and massacred several thousand who had fled to the mound of Kuyunjik hoping the people of Mosul would offer them refuge within the city walls. During his research trips in 1843, the Russian traveller and orientalist Ilya Berezin mentioned that 7,000 Yazidis were killed by Kurds of Rawandiz on the hills of Nineveh near Mosul, shortly before his arrival.

Mir Muhammad of Rawanduz's forces reached Lalish, plundering the sanctuary. A group of Yazidi women and children who had taken refuge in a cave beneath the temple were discovered by soldiers, who lit fires at the cave's entrance, suffocating those sheltering inside. Their remains have been preserved at the site. After Mir Muhammad of Rawanduz's forces controlled most of the Yazidi areas, approximately 10,000 Yazidi prisoners, mostly women and children, were taken to Rawanduz, the capital of the Soran emirate. Upon their arrival, the prisoners were ordered to convert to Islam. Many refused, among them Mir Ali Beg and his entourage. As a result, Ali Beg was executed at the end of 1833 in the valley subsequently known as Gali Ali Beg. Mir Muhammad of Rawanduz left his body hanging from the Rawanduz bridge for three days. Yazidi women and children were abducted and sold in markets. The women among the prisoners were distributed among Muslim Kurds, and the remaining survivors were forced to convert to Islam.

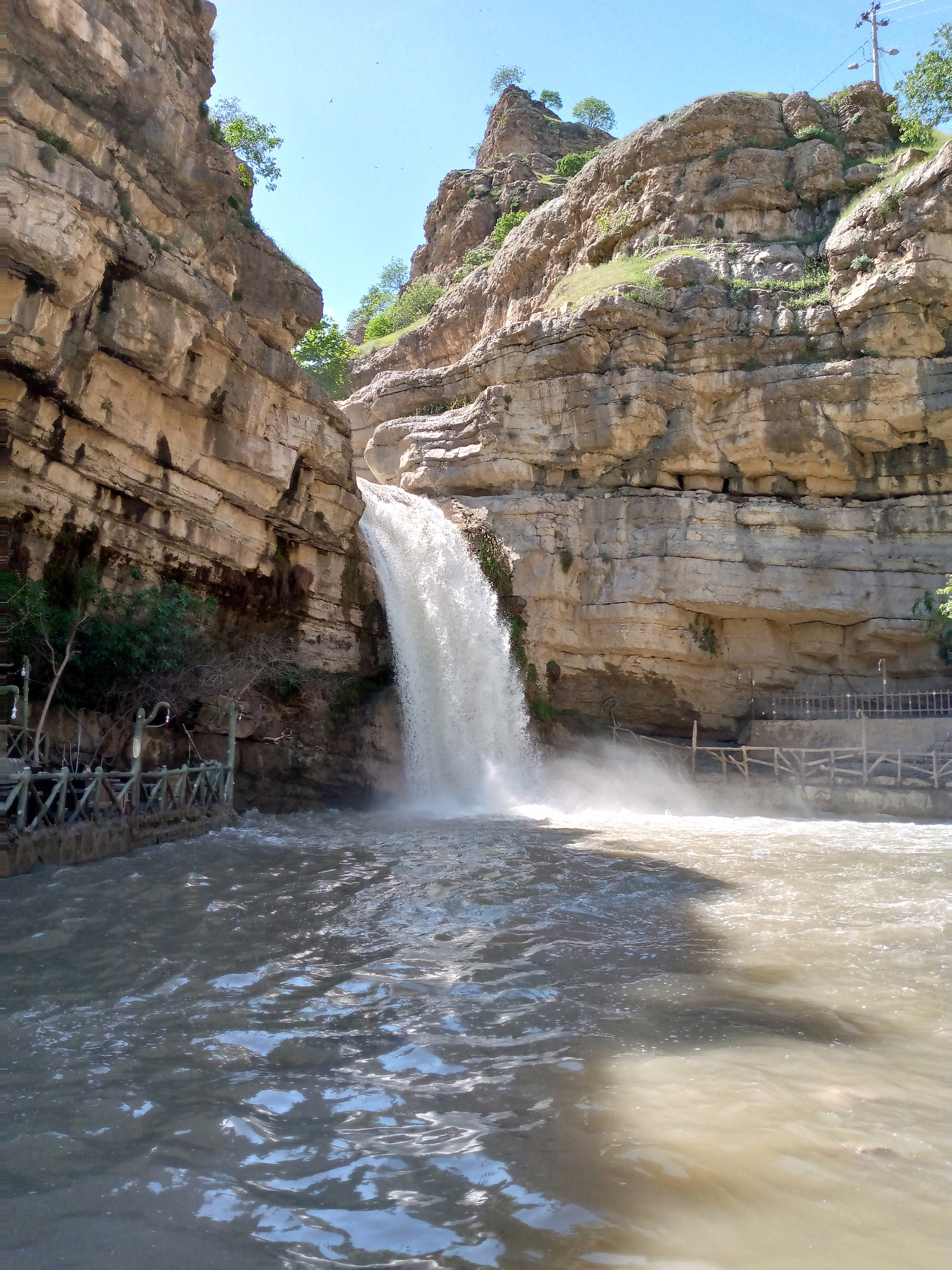
Geli Ali Beg Waterfall, named after Mîr Elî Beg who was executed by Mir Muhammad of Rawanduz at this valley for refusing to convert to Islam

Christian communities lying in the path of Mir Muhammad of Rawanduz's army were also victim to the massacres, The Assyrian town of Alqosh and its Rabban Hormizd Monastery an important convent to the Assyrian Church of the East and the Chaldean Catholic Church was sacked, estimates of the death toll ranged from 272 to 367 dead. Seven priests were among the dead, and the patriarchal Vicar Hnanisho was killed in church while officiating at a service. The most notable victim was Gabriel Dambo. And the tomb of the biblical Prophet Nahum was destroyed. Joseph Audo, was stripped and insulted, but was eventually able to persuade the Kurdish leader to halt the massacre, insisting that he and his fellow-victims were law-abiding 'Syrians', not Yezidis. The monastery of Sheikh Matta suffered the same fate. After the Kurds of Rawanduz sacked Mosul, they also killed the local Christians and Jews. Similar reports on Jews being persecuted are mentioned for other towns under his control, including Ranya, Khoy, Erbil, Aqra, and Zakho.

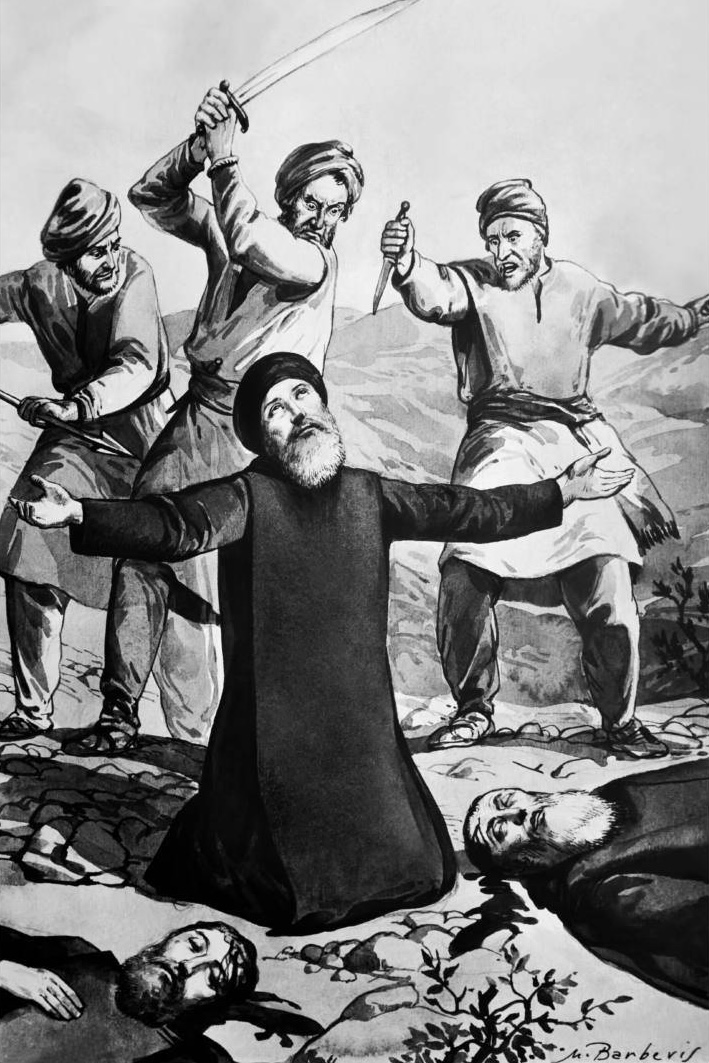
Portrait depicting the killing of Gabriel Danbo during the massacre in Alqosh, Rabban Hormizd Monastery

After subduing most of Sheikhan, Mir Muhammad of Rawanduz advanced into the Bahdinan emirate. Following the capture of Akre, he besieged Amedi, the capital and principal fortress of Bahdinan, which had long been regarded as one of the strongest fortified towns in the region. After a brief siege, the city capitulated. The conquest brought the entire region between the Khabur and the Great Zab under Soran control, including Zakho and Duhok. Mir Muhammad appointed Musa Pasha, a relative and rival of Bahdinan emir Sa'id Pasha, as governor of Amedi after the campaign. The capture of Amedi was especially significant because it served as the capital and principal fortress of the Bahdinan Emirate. Protected by steep cliffs, the town had long been regarded as one of the strongest fortified positions in the region, but prior defeats and dwindling manpower prevented prolonged resistance, and it capitulated after a brief siege.

After the destruction of Shekhan, Mir Muhammad of Rawanduz also led a large force to Sinjar, which unlike Shekhan had not been under the authority of any neighboring Kurdish or Arab emirates. There his forces encountered sustained Yazidi resistance, including under the leadership of Ali Beg's wife, who commanded the defense in Sinjar. After killing and capturing approximately 700 men, Mir Muhammad of Rawanduz's forces took the district in 1834. George Percy Badger later wrote that after facing several defeats Mir Muhammad of Rawanduz finally succeeded in crushing Yazidi resistance there through measures he described as "cruel and barbarous". Khelani reports that after the Bahdinan campaign the Yazidis burned thirty Soran soldiers stationed in their territory, together with their officer, which forced Mir Muhammad to launch another campaign against them again.

Survivors of the campaign dispersed across a wide area. Some took refuge in the Mount Judi and Tur Abdin regions of southeastern Anatolia, others fled to Sinjar or to more distant areas, and others sought refuge in Mosul. The English traveler, archaeologist, and diplomat Austen Henry Layard, who gathered accounts from Yazidis during a visit to the region shortly after the events, recorded what happened to those who reached Mosul:

"The inhabitants of Shaykhān fled to Mosul. It was spring; the river had overflowed its banks, and the bridge of boats had been removed. A few succeeded in crossing the stream; but a crowd of men, women, and children were left upon the opposite side, and congregated on the great mound of Kouyunjik. The Bey of Rowandiz followed them. An indiscriminate slaughter ensued; and the people of Mosul beheld, from their terraces, the murder of these unfortunate fugitives, who cried to them in vain for help — for both Christians and Mussulmans rejoiced in the extermination of an odious and infidel sect, and no arm was lifted in their defence."

Mir Muhammad of Rawanduz's dominance over the Yazidi regions was short-lived. Between 1834 and 1847 all the semiautonomous Kurdish polities were brought back under complete Ottoman control. Mir Muhammad of Rawanduz's expansion had by this point alarmed the Ottoman state, the empire mobilized military forces against him, and he surrendered, with his mufti Mulla Muḥammad Khatt-i issuing a fatwa stating it was religiously impermissible to fight the Ottoman Caliphate. He was summoned to Istanbul to meet the sultan, and upon returning home was murdered.

== Aftermath ==
Estimates suggest that between 70,000 to 135,000 Yazidis were killed. The Anglican priest William Ainger Wigram and his brother Edgar Thomas Ainger Wigram, collected stories of the event during their travels in the region in the early 20th century, saying that so many thousands were killed on the mound above Sennacherib's palace that the site acquired the name "Kouyunjik", meaning "the shambles of the sheep".

The historian Sadiq al-Damlouji estimated that approximately five percent of the Yazidi population in the targeted areas survived. Mir Muhammad of Rawanduz's forces looted Yazidi property including gold and silver, and a number of Yazidi villages and towns were demographically converted to Islam in the aftermath of the campaign. The village of Kallak-a-Dasiniyya, approximately 30 kilometers from Erbil, which had previously marked the border between Yazidi territory and the Soran emirate, was completely destroyed during the campaign. The Yazidis consequently lost all territory from that village to the border of Ain Sifni in the Shekhan region, which passed into the possession of Kurdish Muslim communities. A number of villages west of Erbil, including Kallak, Bardarash, Harrir, and Chirra, which travelers and historians had previously identified as Yazidi settlements, were seized and demographically Islamized by Sunni Kurdish communities in the aftermath of the campaign.

There is disagreement over what Mir Muhammad of Rawanduz's goals were in his campaign against Yazidis and Bahdinan. Some Kurdish writers have characterized his operations as expansionist, stemming from Kurdish nationalist ambitions, arguing that he sought to establish a Kurdish state. Yazidis on the other hand hold him responsible for the genocide against them and preserve its memory through oral and folkloric tradition in the form of epic songs and music known as Stran, many of which recount the events of the campaign and other historical attacks.

The conquest of Bahdinan significantly weakened the emirate, which never fully recovered before the Ottoman centralization campaigns ended the autonomy of the Kurdish emirates during the 1830s and 1840s.

== See also ==
- Persecution of Yazidis
- Massacre of Alqosh (1832)
- Yazidi genocide (2014)
