= Massacre of Alqosh (1832) =

Massacre of Chaldean Assyrians in 1832

- Part of the Yazidi genocide by the Soran Emirate
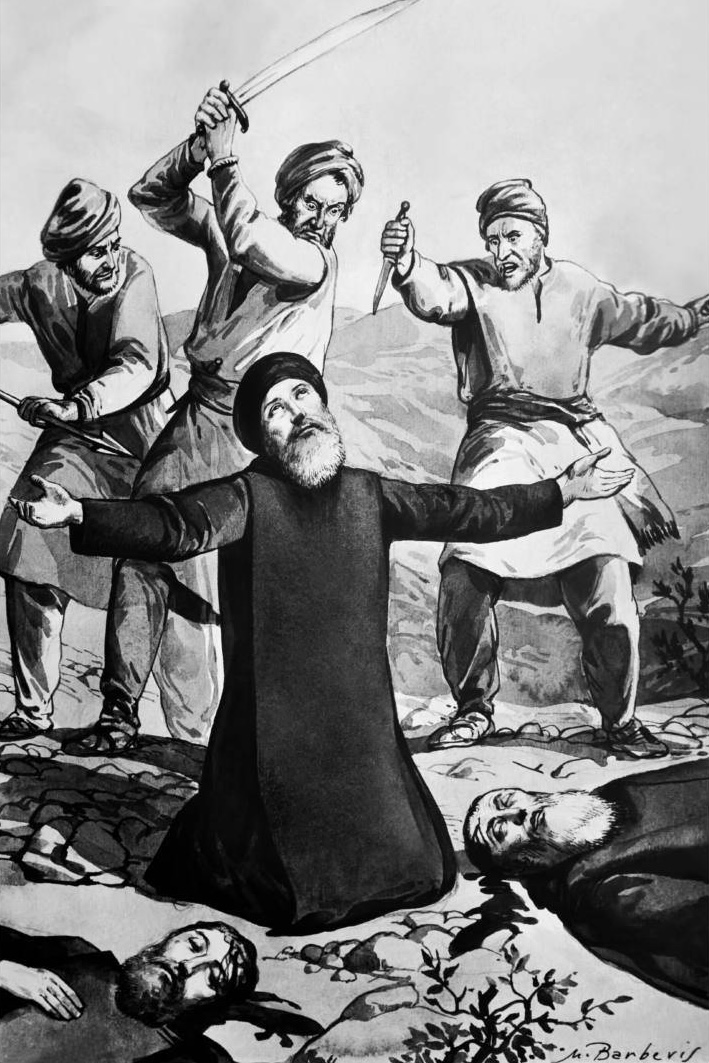
- Portrait depicting the killing of Gabriel Danbo during the massacre
- Native name: ܡܩܛܠܐ ܕܪܒܢ ܗܘܪܡܙܕ
- Location: Alqosh, Mesopotamia (present day Iraqi Kurdistan)
- Date: 15 March 1832
- Weapons: Daggers and other sharp weapons
- Deaths: 272 to 367
- Victim: Chaldean Assyrians
- Perpetrator: Kurdish forces of the Soran Emirate
- Motive: Xenophobia
- The tomb of Prophet Nahum was destroyed during the massacres

The Massacre of Alqosh took place on 15 March 1832, when Kurdish forces of the Soran Emirate attacked the Chaldean Assyrian town of Alqosh. Resulting in 272 to 367 deaths. The town was looted, and the tomb of the biblical prophet Nahum was destroyed. Among those killed was Gabriel Dambo, superior of the Rabban Hormizd Monastery which was also sacked.

== Background ==
Gabriel Danbo, in 1808 initiated a reopening of the Rabban Hormizd Monastery situated in the mountain region near the village of Alqosh for his newly founded Chaldean Antonian Order of St. Hormizd.

Four years earlier Alqosh had lost 700 of its inhabitants in a plague, and the arrival of the Kurds in 1832 was a disaster almost as great.

== Massacre ==
Gabriel Dambo, superior of the Rabban Hormizd monastery, near Alqosh, had just recently arrived from Rome, where he had gone to ask Pope Gregory XVI for approval of his institute. When the Kurds of Mir Muhammad pursued him. The Kurdish troops descended on Alqosh and massacred its citizens, some sources claim they had the impression that their victims were Yezidis. Gabriel knelt alongside his fellow monks and locals while they prayed. When the soldiers approached, they first attacked the three monks, killing them. Gabriel continued praying, as one of the murderers who surrounded him stabbed him in the chest with a dagger. Christian estimates of the death toll ranged from 272 to 367 dead. Seven priests were among the dead, and the patriarchal Vicar Hnanisho was killed in church while officiating at a service. The most important victim, was Gabriel Dambo. Alqosh itself was sacked, the survivors were robbed, and the tomb of Prophet Nahum was destroyed. Joseph Audo, was stripped and insulted, but was eventually able to persuade the Kurdish leader to halt the massacre, insisting that he and his fellow-victims were law-abiding 'Syrians', not Yezidis. In addition to the children, women, and foreigners, and plundering everything there. Mir Muhammad's brother then returned a second time, had everything that had been hidden from them handed over, and left absolutely nothing there, most of its inhabitants who had escaped death, were stripped of their clothes and babies were abandoned as they had been born to their mothers, they also tortured them and did other shameful acts. When Abdallah, the leader of the soldiers, heard that those who had been killed were Christians who paid taxes to the Soran government, he ordered the massacre to be stopped. The brethren, who had escaped, returned to look for the bodies of Gabriel, of Father Augustin of Telkef, of Johannan bar Sabnya, and Jesu Kasko who had been killed. They found only the body of Gabriel. They buried it in the Church of Mar Mica, where it rested until 1849.

== Aftermath and legacy ==
Gabriel Danbo was considered a saint in Eastern Christianity after this, due to his martyred body being found in a ravine three days after his death, described as "healthy, rosy-cheeked, and still seeming to retain vestiges of life”. The Martyrdom of Gabriel Danbo is commemorated on the 15th of March every year.

In 1836 Ottoman forces ended the rule of Mir Muhammad and the quietness was restored.

Some Kurds raided the monastery again in 1842, 1850. Therefore in 1858, the decision was made to build a new Chaldean monastery, called "Our Lady of the Seeds".

On May 10, 2022, the Antonian Hormizd Chaldean Order held an official ceremony to announce the transfer of the remains of Gabriel Danbo, to the new monastery created in memory of the massacre (the Monastery of the Martyr Anba Gabriel Danbo). Today, his encased, mortal remains are publicly displayed at the Monastery.
