= Rasul Beg =

Mir of Soran

- ڕەسووڵ بەگ
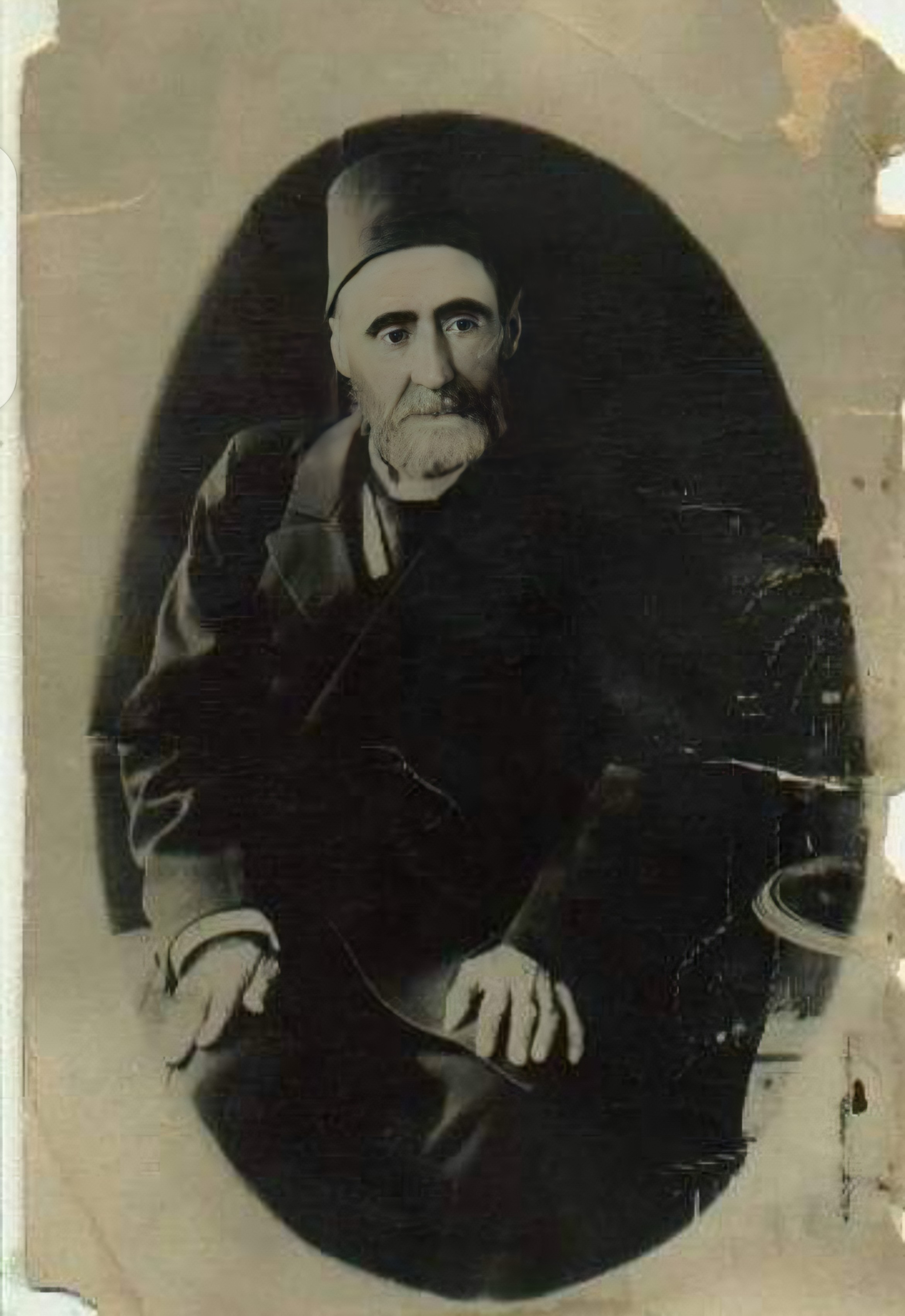
- Portrait of Rasul Beg of Soran
- Born: Late 18th century Rawandiz, Soran Emirate, Ottoman Empire
- Died: Ottoman Empire
- Relatives: Mustafa Beg (father); Mir Muhammad of Rawanduz (brother)
- Military career
- Allegiance: Soran Emirate
- Service years: 1838–1847
- Rank: Emir
- Commands: Soran Emirate
- Conflicts: Mir Muhammad Rebellion; Mir Muhammad's Bahdinan campaign; Siege of Amadiya; Yazidi genocide by the Soran Emirate (1832–1834); Crimean War

Rasul Beg (Central Kurdish: ڕەسووڵ بەگ) was a Kurdish Emir of the Soran Emirate and the brother of Mir Muhammad of Rawanduz. He was the last emir to rule the Soran Emirate in the first half of the nineteenth century. After the death of Mir Muhammad Pasha in 1838, he succeeded him for a short period.

== Background ==
Rasul Beg was born in the late eighteenth century in the town of Rawandiz, within the Soran Emirate. He belonged to the Kurdish ruling family of the emirate. He was the son of Mustafa Beg and belonged to the powerful Kurdish aristocracy of the region. Rasul Beg's brother, Mir Muhammad Pasha, ruled the Soran Emirate from 1816 until his death and led the Rawandiz revolt under the banner of the Soran Emirate.

== Rule ==
Following the death of Mir Muhammad of Rawanduz, Rasul Beg assumed leadership of the emirate.

Rasul beg participated in several wars during his reign and the most notable and his participation in the Crimean War.

His rule was short-lived and took place during a period of regional instability, when the Ottoman Empire was attempting to strengthen its authority over the Kurdish regions and to subdue autonomous principalities such as the Soran Emirate and the Bahdinan Emirate.
