= Geli Ali Beg Waterfall =

Waterfall in Iraq

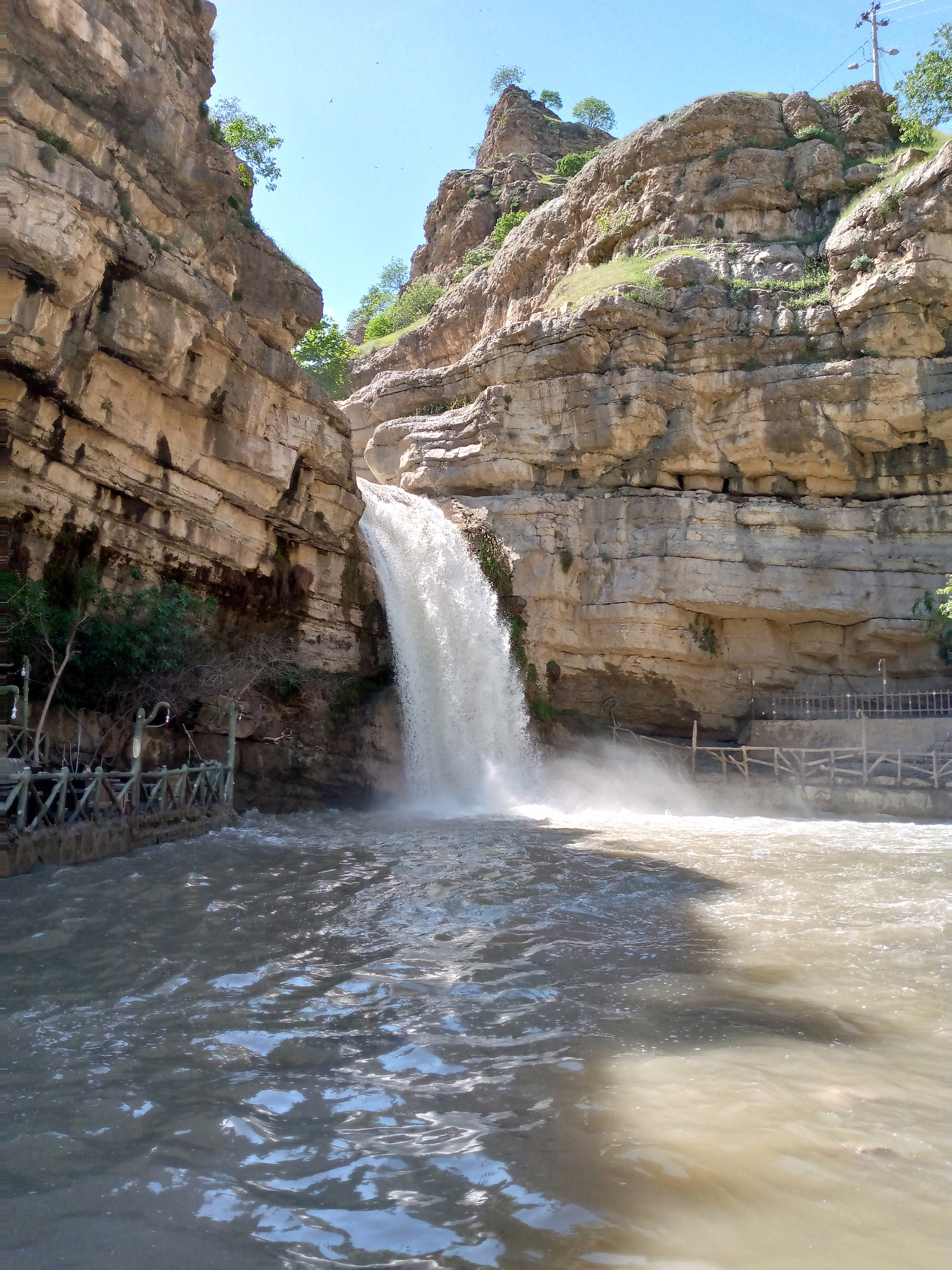
- Geli Ali Beg Waterfall, 2023
- Interactive map of Geli Ali Beg Waterfall
- Location: Kurdistan Region, Iraq, about 130 kilometers north of Erbil
- Coordinates: 36°37′53″N 44°26′45″E
- Type: Named after Yazidi prince Mîr Elî Beg

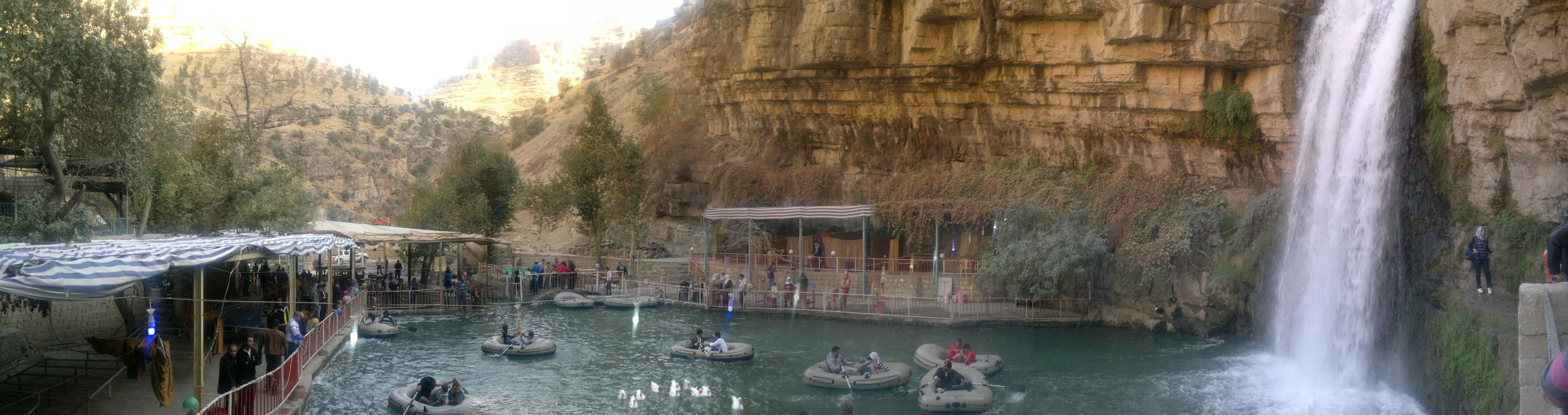
Panorama of Geli Ali Beg Waterfall

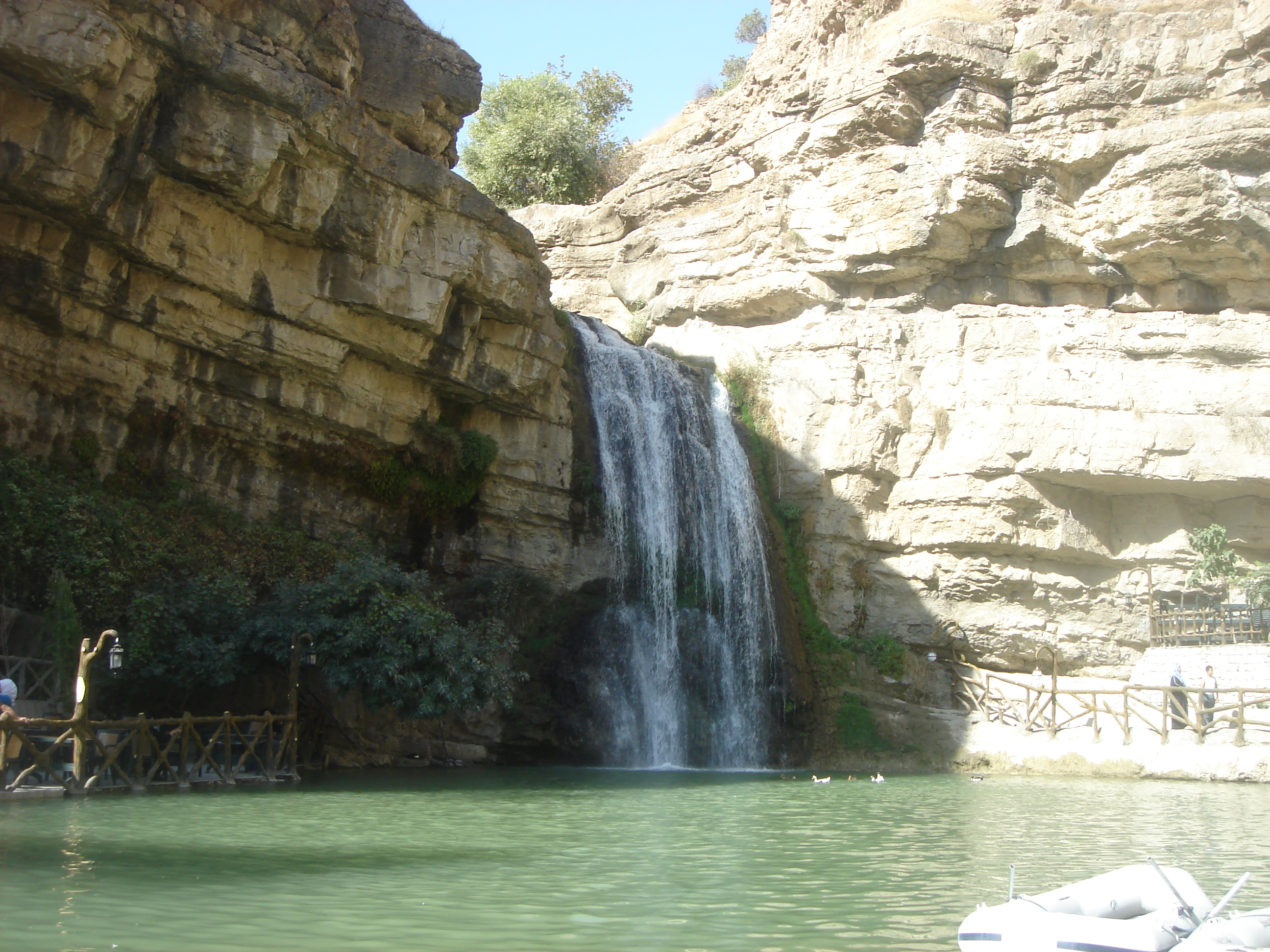
Another view

Geli Ali Beg Waterfall (Kurdish: Geliyê Elî Beg ,گەلیی عەلی بەگ) is located in the Kurdistan Region of Iraq, which lies some 130 km north of Erbil.

The waterfall is named after the Yazidi prince of Sheikhan principality, Mîr Elî Beg who was executed during the Yazidi genocide by Soran Emirate by Prince Muhammad of Rawanduz at this valley at the end of 1833 for refusing to convert to Islam.

It featured on the 5-dinar note issued 1978–1990.

== See also ==
- Yazidi genocide by the Soran Emirate (1832-1834)
