= Lara Zara =

Assyrian politician

Lara Yousif Zara ܠܪܐ ܝܘܣܦ ܙܪܐ لارا يوسف زارا
- Incumbent
- Assumed office 27 July 2017
- Governor: Nofal Hammadi (2017); Faiez Abed Jahwareh (2018); Mansour Marid (2019)
- Preceded by: Faiez Abed Jahwareh (discharged over allegations of corruption, but later reinstated.)

Personal details
- Born: 1982 Alqosh, Iraq
- Party: Kurdistan Democratic Party
- Other political affiliations: Shlama Entity (2014 elections)
- Education: Graduate in economics and management

Lara Yousif Zara (Syriac: ܠܪܐ ܝܘܣܦ ܙܪܐ) is an Assyrian politician who is currently serving as the mayor of Alqosh in the Nineveh Governorate of Iraq. A member of the Kurdistan Democratic Party, Zara was appointed to the mayorship in July 2017 by the KDP-led Nineveh Provincial Council after the previous mayor had charges of corruption by the Provincial Council. She is both the first female mayor of Alqosh and the first woman to serve as mayor of any city in Iraq.

== Background ==
Zara was born in 1982 in the town of Alqosh, and graduated with a bachelor's degree in economics and management from Al-Hadba'a University College in Mosul in 2006. For the next three years, she was an Assyrian language teacher in Alqosh, and continued to work as she settled into a permanent-teacher position.

After the Fall of Mosul, when ISIS took over large swathes of the Nineveh Plains from the Iraqi government, Zara stayed back to defend the city with the help of the Kurdish Peshmerga and the Nineveh Plain Protection Units. Pictures of Zara with the Kurdish flag, as well as in military uniform, spread over the internet after her involvement had come to light. It was also from her involvement with the Peshmerga that she joined the Kurdistan Democratic Party.

Zara had previously ran for the 2014 Iraqi parliamentary election under the Shlama Entity, but failed to win any seats. In May 2017, she helped to found the Alqosh branch of the Chaldean League, a Chaldean Catholic Church-backed sectarian political party founded by Cardinal Louis Raphael Sako.

== Mayorship of Alqosh ==
In July 2017, Zara was formally elected to the mayorship of Alqosh by the pro-Kurdish Nineveh Provincial Council. This followed the dismissal of the previous mayor, Faiez Abed Jawareh, over allegations of corruption. He had already been dismissed and reinstated prior, after the installation of KDP-member Adel Amin Omar and protests from residents of Alqosh. Protests once again broke out after the instillment of Zara, with allegations that the KDP was co-opting the Assyrian minority into supporting the planned 2017 Kurdistan Region independence referendum, and annexing the Nineveh Plain under its territory. Zara argued that only Kurdistan Regional Government can keep the locals of Alqosh safe, mentioning the situation in Mosul as a reason to not trust the federal government in Baghdad. Protestors against Zara's inauguration were subsequently met with harassment and physical force by Kurdish forces, much as Jawareh had faced by the KDP.

In April 2019, Zara welcomed a delegation from the United States, led by Deputy Chief of the American embassy in Iraq and Consul General in Kurdistan Steve Fagan, to Alqosh for the inspection of the Tomb of Prophet Nahum located in the town. In June 2019, she visited the United States and met with American officials to raise awareness of the circumstances of the Christians in the country. The Assyrian Policy Institute was in attendance during the meeting and accused Zara of illegally holding the position of mayor, citing a federal case in Baghdad rendering her election unconstitutional and previous failed attempt to have appealed the results, of which Zara denied the allegations.

Discussions of Zara as the mayor of Alqosh typically note her role as being Iraq's first female mayor. In an interview with the United Nations Development Programme, Zara had hoped that in the future, more women would lead the country's politics through official representation in parliament and other places. Zara has also previously noted that she looks to the future to prevent Assyrians from future emigration outside of Iraq, citing the Assyrian diaspora in the Metro Detroit area.

In November 2021, she announced that with the financial support of the US Government, the Office of the Prime Minister of the Kurdistan Regional Government, and private donors, the main part of the restoration work on the tomb of Prophet Nahum had been completed; however, the site was not yet ready to be reopened to the public.

== Personal life ==
Zara was married to her now husband, Duraid Jamil, in 2007. Her sister is Shrara Yousef Zara Ishaq, currently a member of the Athra Alliance.
