= Mir Muhammad of Rawanduz =

Kurdish prince of Rawanduz

Mir Muhammad
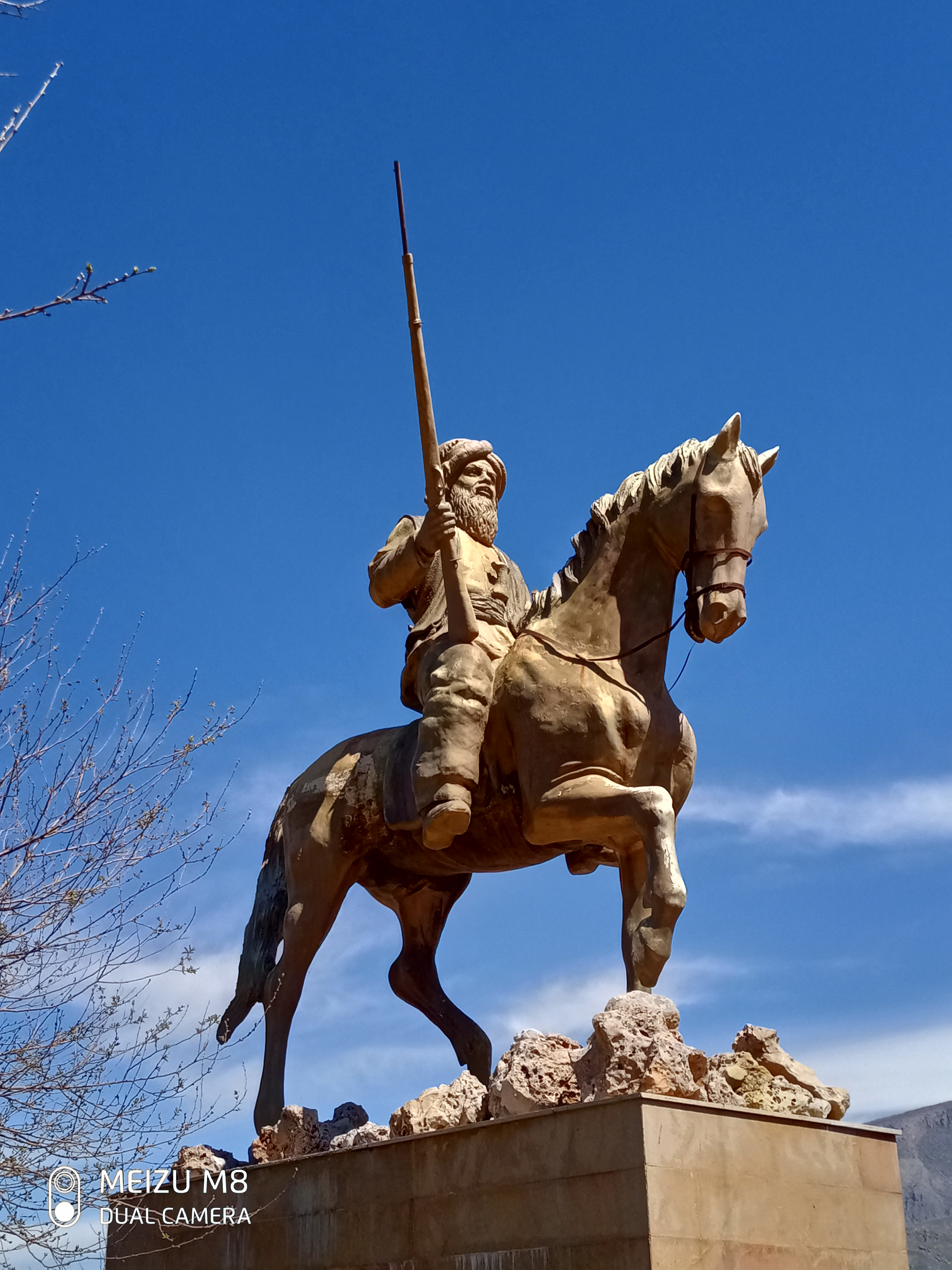
- The statue of Mir Muhammad in Rawanduz

Mir of Soran
- Reign: 1814–1838
- Predecessor: Mustafa Beg
- Successor: Rasul Beg
- Born: 1783; Rawanduz, Soran Emirate, Ottoman Empire
- Died: 26 Dec 1838
- Father: Mustafa Pasha of Rawanduz
- Military career
- Conflicts: Ottoman-Persian War (1820-1823); Rawanduz Revolt; Mir Muhammad's Bahdinan campaign; Siege of Amadiya; Yazidi genocide by the Soran Emirate (1832-1834)

Mir Muhammad (Kurdish: Mîr Mihemed, Sorani Kurdish: میر محەممەد; also known as Mirê Kor, the "blind prince". Born in Rawandiz; 1783–1838) was the Kurdish Mir of the Soran Emirate (1813–1838) centered in Soran. He campaigned against the Emirate of Bohtan in 1834 and brought its ruler under his authority.

Mir Kor had the title of Mir-i miran "Mir of mirs". Under Emir Kor, the Soran emirate developed a powerful army. It consisted of between 30 and 50,000 tribal musketeers who were given regular salaries, having the appearance of a national army. Kor himself ate each evening with 100-200 soldiers from different tribes. In 1835, the British officer Major Taylor, the British Political Agent in Baghdad, estimated that the Soran army numbered “...not less than 80,000 mountaineers”, Mr Brant, who was consul of England in Erzurum, stated similar expression in his report dated 1836 and said:

If all the Kurds were subjugated from Angora to the country of the Bey of Ravendooz they certainly could furnish much above 100.000 men.

Mir Muhammad was responsible for the genocidal campaign against the Yazidis. It is considered the bloodiest event in recorded Yazidi history. Estimates suggest that between 70,000 to 135,000 Yazidis were killed. He frequently persecuted Jews. In a interaction with an American Christian missionary Mir Muhammad stated that Jews were bought and sold as commonly as donkeys by the Kurds.

== Path to power and expansion ==
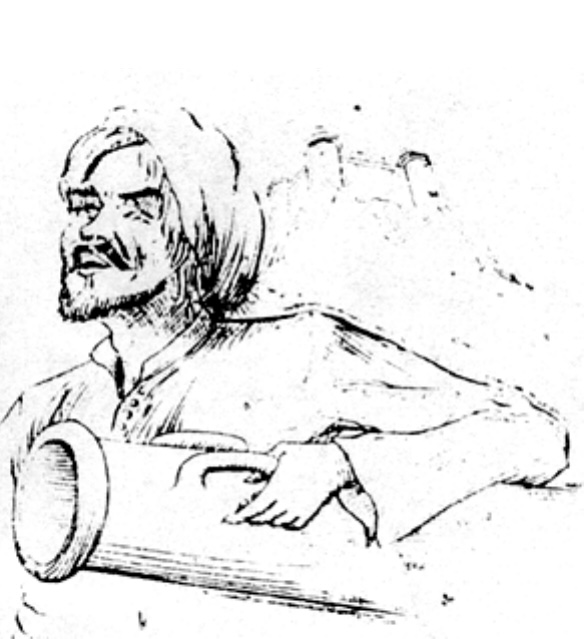
Portrait of the Prince in Qajar documents

In 1814, at the age of 31, he succeeded his father Mustafa Pasha as Prince of Soran. Mohammed Pasha is portrayed as a cruel person who was probably not afraid to kill family members in order to stay in power. Therefore there was also the suspicion that he had his father blinded in order to become a prince himself. But this was denied by an English doctor who had treated his father.

After coming to power, he had potential competitors eliminated. So he accused his treasurer Abdullah Aga of conspiracy and had him executed. Then Mohammed Pasha started waging war against his uncles. On December 14, 1814, he besieged Shteyn Castle, where his uncle Teymur Aga was. After four weeks of siege, his uncle and cousin were hanged on January 10, 1815. Shortly thereafter, he defeated and hanged his other uncle, Yahya Bey.

=== Early expansion and independency ===
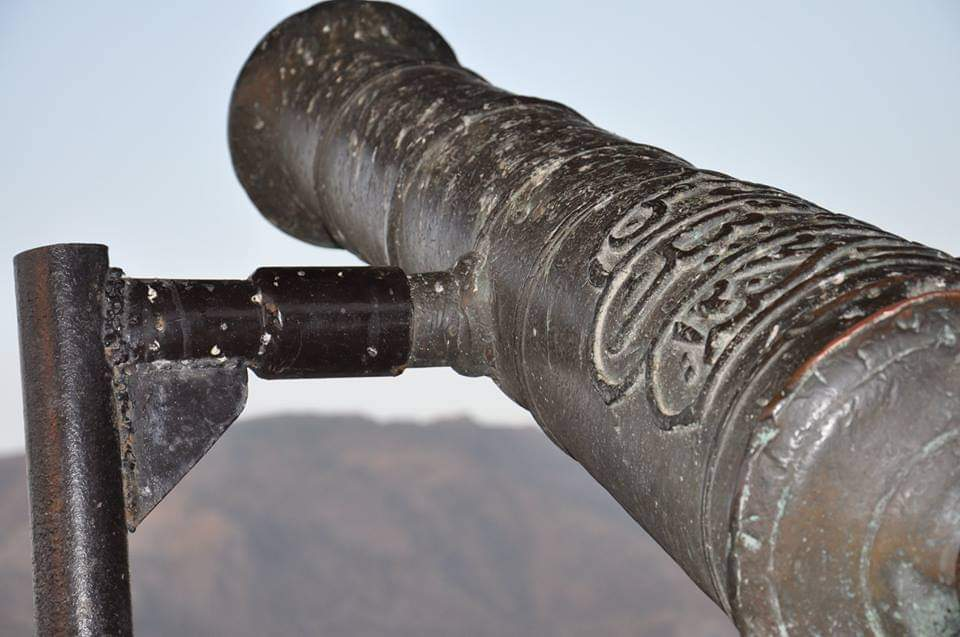
A canon from the Muhammed Pasha period

Mir Muhammad’s strict goal was to establish an independent Kurdish-Islamic entity. A multitude of different tribes joined his army such as the Rewendek, Sidek, Shirwani, Rusuri, Malibas, Muzuri, Sheikhab, Nurik, Kheilani, Khoshnaw, Hnearai, Herki, Sheikh Mahmudi, Kassan, Derijiki, Bamami, Sekw, Shikuli, Mendik, Baimar, Balak, and Piraji. Having thus eliminated the internal competitor, he set about expanding his principality. First he had the city walls of Rawanduz reinforced and a fort built on a hill outside the city. Then he went against the neighboring tribes. He was considered a merciless prince who had all of his defeated opponents executed. He wanted to conquer the area between Great Zab and Little Zab. To do this he had to fight against the Baban principality. He conquered the cities of Harir (1822), Koya (October 1823), Ranya (February 1824) and Makhmur and Altun Kupri in September 1823. He had thus displaced the Baban and the small Zab was now the border between Soran and Baban. The Ottoman governor in Baghdad, Ali Rıza Pasha, was unable to do anything about it. He also gave him the title of Pasha. Nevertheless, Muhammed Pasha declared himself independent and, as a sign of his sovereignty, had the Friday sermons (Khutbah) read out in his name. He set out to build a large army and set up factories to produce weapons. He also had coins minted on which he called himself al-Amīr al-Mansūr Muhammad Bīk.

As the region experienced a power vacuum due to the decline of Baban, the Russo-Turkish War from 1828 to 1829, and the Egyptian–Ottoman War from 1831 to 1833, he led a tribal force to Rawandiz and built a citadel in the town as they build up a military. Between 1831 and 1834 he was able to capture several towns and cities in other Kurdish emirates. 1831 he captured the Bahdinan emirate of Amedi.

Fearing a cooperation between the Soran Emirate and Muhammad Ali of Egypt, the Ottomans dispatched an army to Soran in 1834. Mire Kor was able to repeal the forces and push towards Iran. This led Kurdish notables from Bradost, Akre and Amedi to complain to Reşid Mehmed Pasha of the Ottoman government alleging they were oppressed by Mir Kor of Soran.

Muhammad Pasha had a talent for coordinating armies and uniting various Kurdish tribes under one umbrella despite their disagreements, pitting them against the Ottoman central government. His military skills were strict and brutal against the enemy, leading to numerous beheadings of prisoners ordered by Muhammad Pasha.

By securing the allegiance of this powerful tribe, he expanded his political reach and shifted the balance of power in the region. He would go on to conquer Cizre. From there he threatened the cities of Mardin and Nusaybin. Mir Muhammad strengthened his authority when he brought the Milli Kurds under his influence, gaining control over their key territories such as Mardin, Urfa, Diyarbakir and Siverek. But he had to return to Amedi when Said Pasha took advantage of his absence to revolt. Mohammed Pasha repulsed Said Pasha and took bitter revenge on the city.

== Persecution of Yazidis and Jews ==
=== Firman of Mir Muhammad ===
Following all of this, Muhammad Pasha was given an opportunity to expand his territory. Mullah Yahya, a member of the Mzurî tribe from the Principality of Bahdinan, asked Mohammed Pasha for help in a feud. The Mzurî tribal leader Ali Agha was murdered by the Yazidi tribal leader Mir Ali Beg. However, the Prince of Bahdinan Said Pasha refused to allow the Mzuri to take revenge. So Mullah Yahya turned to Mohammed Pasha and asked him to take revenge on the Yazidis of Jabal Sinjar. Mohammed Pasha was able to use this punitive expedition to conquer the principality of Badinan. He issued a fatwa against the "infidel" Yazidis by his own Mufti Mullah Mohammed Khalti and crossed the Great Zab in 1831/32.

In 1832, Muhammad Pasha and his troops committed a massacre against the Yazidis in Khatarah. Subsequently, they attacked the Yazidis in the Baadre-Shekhan region and killed many of them. In another attempt he and his troops occupied over 300 Yazidi villages. The emir kidnapped over 10,000 Yazidis and sent them to Rawandiz and gave them the ultimatum of either converting to Islam or being killed. Most of the Yazidis converted to Islam and those who refused to convert to Islam were killed.

Mohammed Pasha acted with great brutality against the Yazidis and massacred thousands of them. Some of the surviving Yazidis fled towards Tur Abdin and Mosul. Christian villages and monasteries were also attacked and plundered. After "avenging" the tribal leader, he took over the town of Akre. After the conquer of Akre, the capital of the Bahdinan Principality, Amedi fell and Prince Said Pasha fled. With the fall of Amedi, the entire principality fell complietly under Mohammed Pasha‘s power. At this time he controlled the area from the Little Zab to the Khabur River.

Later, Mohammed Pasha marched north and conquered Cizre. From their he threatened the cities of Mardin and Nusaybin. But he had to return to Amedi when Said Pasha took advantage of his absence to revolt. Mohammed Pasha repulsed Said Pasha and took bitter revenge on the city. He was consistently hostile towards the Yazidi’s. He described them as devil worshippers. He also ordered numerous exploitative marches against Christian villages such as Alqosh in 1833. During his reign, he described these minorities as second-class citizens. Numerous arrests he ordered were directed exclusively against Yazidi governors under his jurisdiction.

=== Persecution of Jews ===
Under the rule of Mir Muhammad the Jewish population was affected by violence and looting notably during the Siege of Amadiya. They “were treated with merciless cruelty and oppression." Many were forced to migrate and some fled the city after its fall. Similar reports are mentioned for other towns under his control, including Ranya, Khoy, Erbil, Aqra, and Zakho. After the Kurds sacked Mosul during the Yazidi campaign, they also killed the local Jews and Christians.

Dr. Lobdell, an American Christian missionary, visited Mir Muhammad, he wrote: “The Pasha of Ravendooz told me that when he was first appointed to that district, three years since, Jews were bought and sold by the Koords as commonly as donkeys.”

Following the defeat of Mir Muhammad, Amadiya came under the rule of the Ottoman governor of Mosul. The situation of the Jewish community improved slightly.

== Defeat and aftermath ==
The Ottoman Sultan in Istanbul could no longer remain inactive and mobilized against Mohammed Pasha. The rebellious Muhammad Ali Pasha had made it clear to the Ottomans that the hot-tempered Muhammad Pasha should not be underestimated. The suspicion that both rebels were in contact made the problem more acute. In 1834, an Ottoman army led by Reşid Mehmed Pasha was sent towards Soran. His army was joined by soldiers from the Ottoman governors of Mosul and Baghdad.

The Soran Emirate was dismantled in 1838. It is also worth mentioning that Reşit Mehmet Pasha had previously issued a fatwa that forbade Mohammed Pasha's Muslim warriors from fighting against the army of the Ottoman caliph. Mohammed Pasha was summoned to Istanbul and ceremoniously received by Sultan Mahmud II. It was decided that Mohammed Pasha should be exiled to Trabzon. But on his way, he disappeared in the Black Sea area and the Ottoman Empire supported his brother Rasul as the Emir of the Emirate. The Emirate would ultimately fall victim to the growing centralization of the Ottoman Empire.

== Reception ==
=== Reception by Kurds ===
Muhammad Pasha of Rawanduz is described, along with Bedir Khan Beg, as one of the pioneers of Kurdish nationalism.

=== Reception by Christians ===
“The Christians evidently thought me their friend; for they brought me apples, plums, apricots, figs, walnuts, almonds, mulberries and eggs, refusing all com- pensation, which a Koord would never do.”

— (Mir Muhammad stated during a interaction with an American missionary)

=== Comparisons ===
He has been compared to Saddam Hussein for their similarities and both were presented as a “symbol and hero" in their nation. Saddam's personality and characteristics bear a striking resemblance to Mir Muhammad. Some critics argue that Saddam Hussein inherited and embraced the methods of violence, brutality and ethnic cleansing of Mir Muhammad.

== Legacy ==
There were traits of Kurdish awareness by the Soran Emirate including the desire to unite all Kurdish areas under one rule and the use of Kurdish uniforms for his army. On this, Emir Kor's brother Rasul told British writer and traveller Frederick Milingen:

With an aspiring genius he had conceived the grande idée of emancipating his country from the authority of the sultans, and of consolidating the power of his family. Uniting the qualities of a conqueror and of a legislator, Mehemet Pasha succeeded in extending his sway over the neighbouring provinces of Kerkuk[sic] and Mussul [sic], and in gathering under his flag a large number of Koordish [sic] troop.

Moreover, researcher Ghalib writes:

[T]hrough many centuries of Ottoman rule, they [Kurds] could not build up a sense of community between the Kurds and the dominant ruler. Kurds remembered their happiness under Soran and other Kurdish emirates. Therefore, they did not welcome the Ottoman officials. Remembering the past is important for keeping one’s own history in mind.

== See also ==
- Mir Muhammad Rebellion
- Yazidi genocide by the Soran Emirate (1832-1834)
- Persecution of Yazidis by Kurds

== Bibliography ==
- Ebraheem, Sharameen (2013), The Impact of Architectural Identity on Nation Branding: The Case Study of Iraqi Kurdistan. (PDF), Manchester Metropolitan University's Research Repository
- Eppel, Michael (2016), A People Without a State, The Kurds from the Rise of Islam to the Dawn of Nationalism, Routledge, ISBN 978-1-4773-0911-7
- Eppel, Michael (2018), "The Kurdish emirates", Routledge Handbook on the Kurds, Routledge Handbooks Online, pp. 35–47, doi:10.4324/9781315627427-4, ISBN 978-1-138-64664-3, S2CID 186808301
- Ghalib, Sabah Abdullah (2011), The Emergence of Kurdism with Special Reference to the Three Kurdish Emirates within the Ottoman Empire, 1800-1850 (PDF), University of Exeter
- Millingen, Frederick (1870), Wild Life Among the Koords, Hurst and Blackett
- Mustafa, Amanj Ahmad (2019), سیاسه‌تی ده‌وڵه‌تی عوسمانی به‌رانبه‌ر میرنشینی سۆران له‌ سه‌رده‌می میر محه‌مه‌دی ڕەواندزید (-) (in Kurdish and English), Soran University, doi:10.31918/twejer.1923.10 (inactive 1 July 2025)
