= Sadiq al-Damaluji =

Sadiq al-Damlouji
- صديق الدملوجي
- Born: 1880; Mosul, Ottoman Empire
- Died: 15 April 1958; Mosul, Kingdom of Iraq
- Occupations: Historian, writer, administrator
- Known for: Studies on Kurdish emirates and Yazidis

Sadiq bin Saʿid bin ʿAbd al-Rahman al-Damluji (1880 – 15 April 1958) was a prominent Iraqi historian and writer from the well-known al-Damlouji family of Mosul. He was born in the Sarjkhana quarter of Mosul in 1880 and grew up in a religious household known locally as Bayt al-Mudir. His father served as the head of the religious scholars of Mosul.

Al-Damlouji was fluent in Turkish, Persian, and Kurdish. He initially turned to journalism and worked early in his career as a regular contributor to the Mosul-based newspaper al-Najah, whose first issue appeared on 12 November 1910. The newspaper served as the mouthpiece of the Freedom and Accord Party, which opposed the ruling Committee of Union and Progress in Istanbul. His writing style in Turkish was considered stronger than in Arabic.

Because of his articles opposing the Unionists, he was referred to a military court in Mosul in 1914 and dismissed from his position. As a result, he went into hiding and did not return to Mosul until it fell to the British in 1918. He later entered administrative service. His first appointment was as a clerk, followed by service as a tax collector. He gradually rose through the ranks and eventually became district director of Akre (Atrosh), and later served as qa'im maqam (district governor) in several districts. During his career he worked in various Iraqi towns including Tal Afar, Sinjar, Mankish, Najaf, Samawah, Al-Shatra, and Al-Qurnah.

While serving as qa'im maqam of Al-Qurnah in 1927, he had a serious dispute with a British administrative inspector that resulted in his dismissal from office. Afterward, he devoted himself to research and writing, producing several books and studies.

== Works ==
- The Yazidis (1949)
- Midhat Pasha Baghdad (1953)
- The Kurdish Emirate of Bahdinan or the Emirate of Amadiya (1952)
- Al-Anqad (1954), his final book, consisting of essays and reflections on history, literature, and sociology. The book was withdrawn from the printing press by his brother and was never distributed commercially.

He also authored numerous articles and studies published in several newspapers and journals, including al-Najah and the Mosul-based journal al-Jazira.

Al-Damlouji died in Mosul on 15 April 1958.
