= Alqosh =

Town in Nineveh, Iraq

Alqosh ܐܲܠܩܘܿܫ ألقوش
- Town
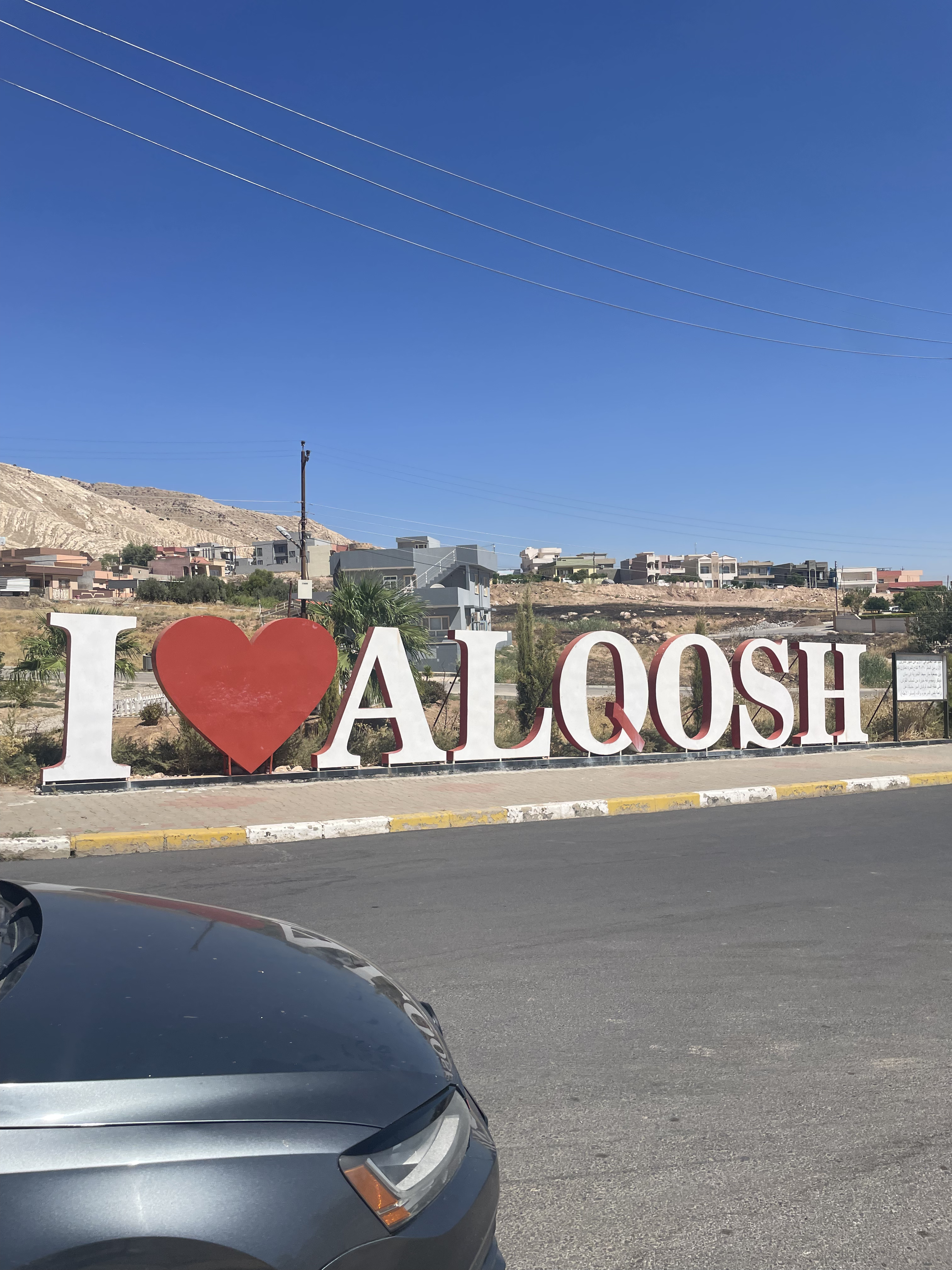
- Entry way sign, spelling "I ♡ Alqosh"

- Location within Iraq
- Coordinates: 36°43′56″N 43°5′43″E
- Country: Iraq
- Governorate: Nineveh Governorate
- District: Tel Keppe District
- Founded: 1500 BC
- De-facto control: Kurdistan Region

Population
  - Total: c.4,600
- Time zone: GMT +3
  - Summer (DST): GMT +4

Alqosh (Syriac: ܐܲܠܩܘܿܫ, Jewish Babylonian Aramaic: אלקוש, Arabic: ألقوش, alternatively spelled Alkosh, Alqoš, or Alqush) is a town in the Nineveh Plains of northern Iraq, a sub-district of the Tel Keppe District situated 45 km north of the city of Mosul.

The inhabitants of Alqosh are Assyrians who since the 18th century now mostly adhere to the Chaldean Catholic Church. During the Iron Age, the Alqosh plain appears to have been home to the small regional kingdom of Qumāne, but was subsequently annexed by Assyria.

== Landmarks ==
The town of Alqosh is set at the foot of a mountain known as ṭūrəd-‘Alquš meaning “the mountain of Alqosh”. In the vicinity, there are the kahfa/kāfa smōqa (the red cave), guppəd-naṭōpa (the cave of dripping), guppəd-māya (the cave of water), guppəd-saṭāna (the cave of Satan), guppa mgurəgma (the thundering cave), and a valley šwīṯəd-ganāwe (the bed of thieves) at the foot of Alqosh mountain.

Behind the mountain there is also the site of Bezqin, known in Classical Syriac sources as bizqīn (Syriac: ܒܙܩܝܢ) and pronounced by modern Alqosh as bisqin, containing the remains of an orchard and a Syriac Orthodox monastery, which may have originally been part of the Church of the East, and containing springs. After the Simele Massacre this was left and came to be ruined by vandals, and most of the ancient trees cut down or burnt.

== Christianity ==
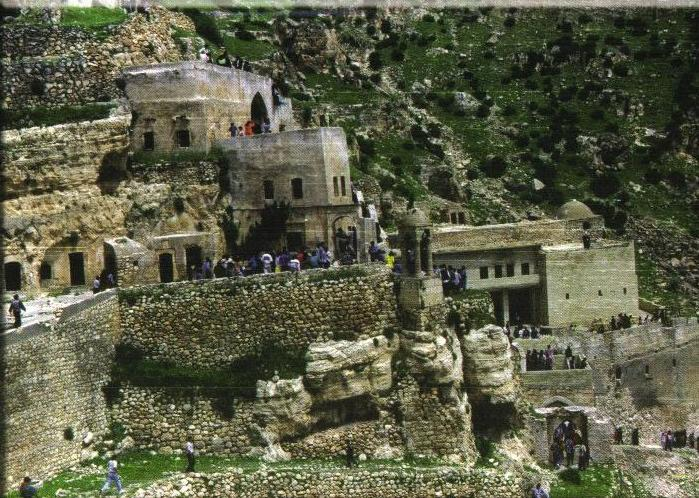
Rabban Hormizd Monastery

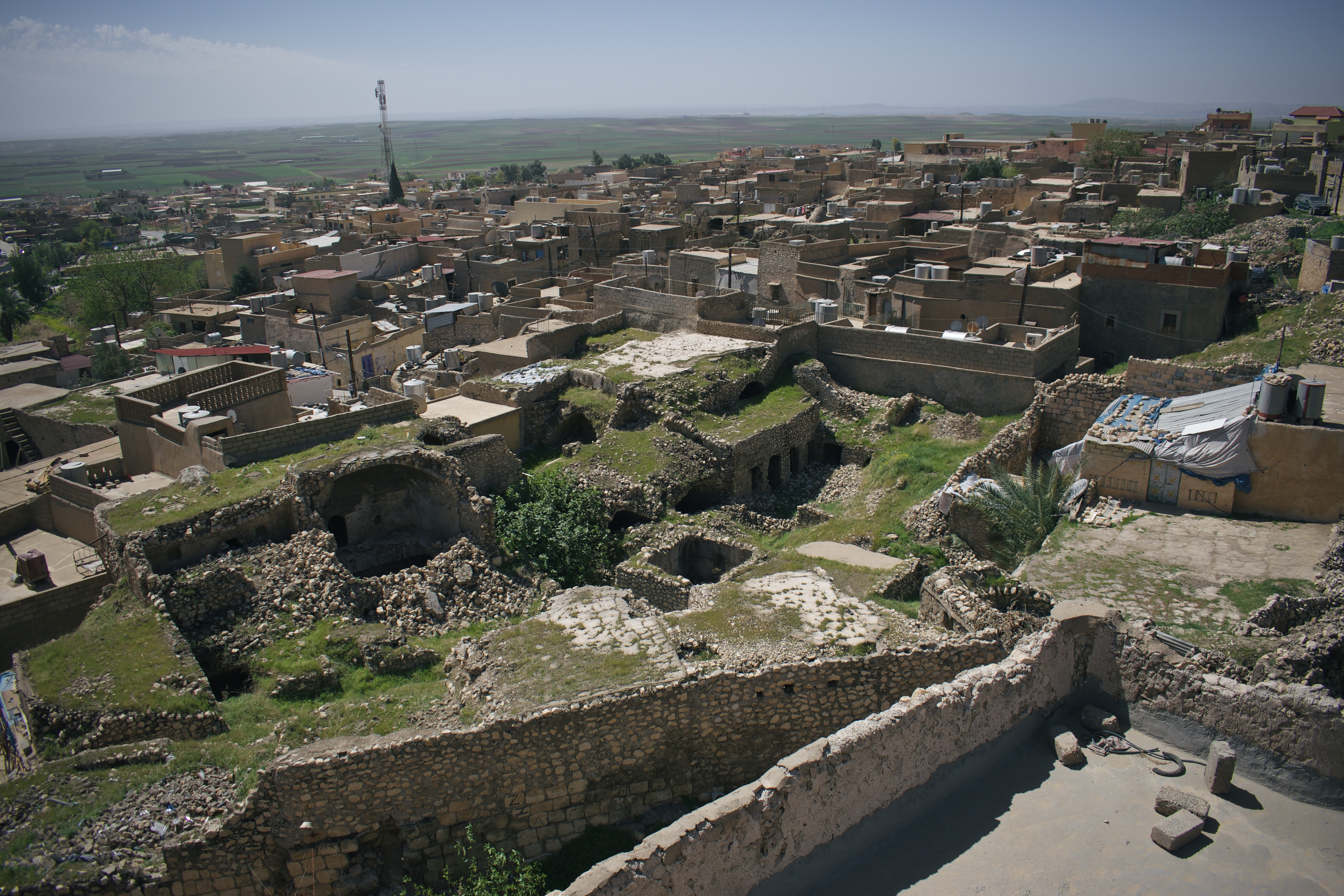
Views around the town of Alqosh

The Assyrian people had gradually converted from Mesopotamian Religion to Eastern Rite Christianity between the 1st and 5th centuries AD. The importance of Alqosh for the Assyrian Church of the East arose from its proximity to the Rabban Hormizd Monastery, named after its seventh-century founder Rabban Hormizd (Rabban means "monk"), who is venerated as a saint in the churches descended from the Assyrian Church of the East.

The monastery, built on the mountain slope, was originally built to defend the Assyrians against Muslim armies, and largely fortified over time. It became a centre of learning for the Church of the East not far from another centre but of the Syriac Orthodox Church. It was the burial place of the patriarchs of the Church of the East from the late fifteenth century and was their seat from the time of Shimun VI (1503–1538) until the end of the series of patriarchs known as the Eliya line. Isolated and cut off by snow from Alqosh in winter, it never became their permanent residence, and its line of patriarchs is commonly described as the Mosul line or as resident in Alqosh. Today, the monastery continues to be venerated as a symbol of Assyrian and Christian resistance against those who have tried to attack it, especially following the Fall of Mosul and the War in Iraq (2013–2017).

In the schism of 1552, the abbot of the monastery, Yohannan Sulaqa, was elected irregularly to the post of patriarch by several bishops who were dissatisfied with the restriction of patriarchal succession to members of a single family. By tradition, a patriarch could be ordained only by someone of archiepiscopal (metropolitan) rank, a rank to which only members of that one family were promoted. For that reason, Sulaqa travelled to Rome, where, presented as the new patriarch-elect, he entered communion with the Catholic Church, was ordained by the Pope, and recognized as patriarch of the "Church of Mosul and Athura". He and his successors (who eventually formally broke communion with Rome) took up residence further east. This schism gave rise to the Chaldean Catholic Church, in opposition to what historians call the traditionalist wing of the Church of the East, that which officially adopted the name Assyrian Church of the East.

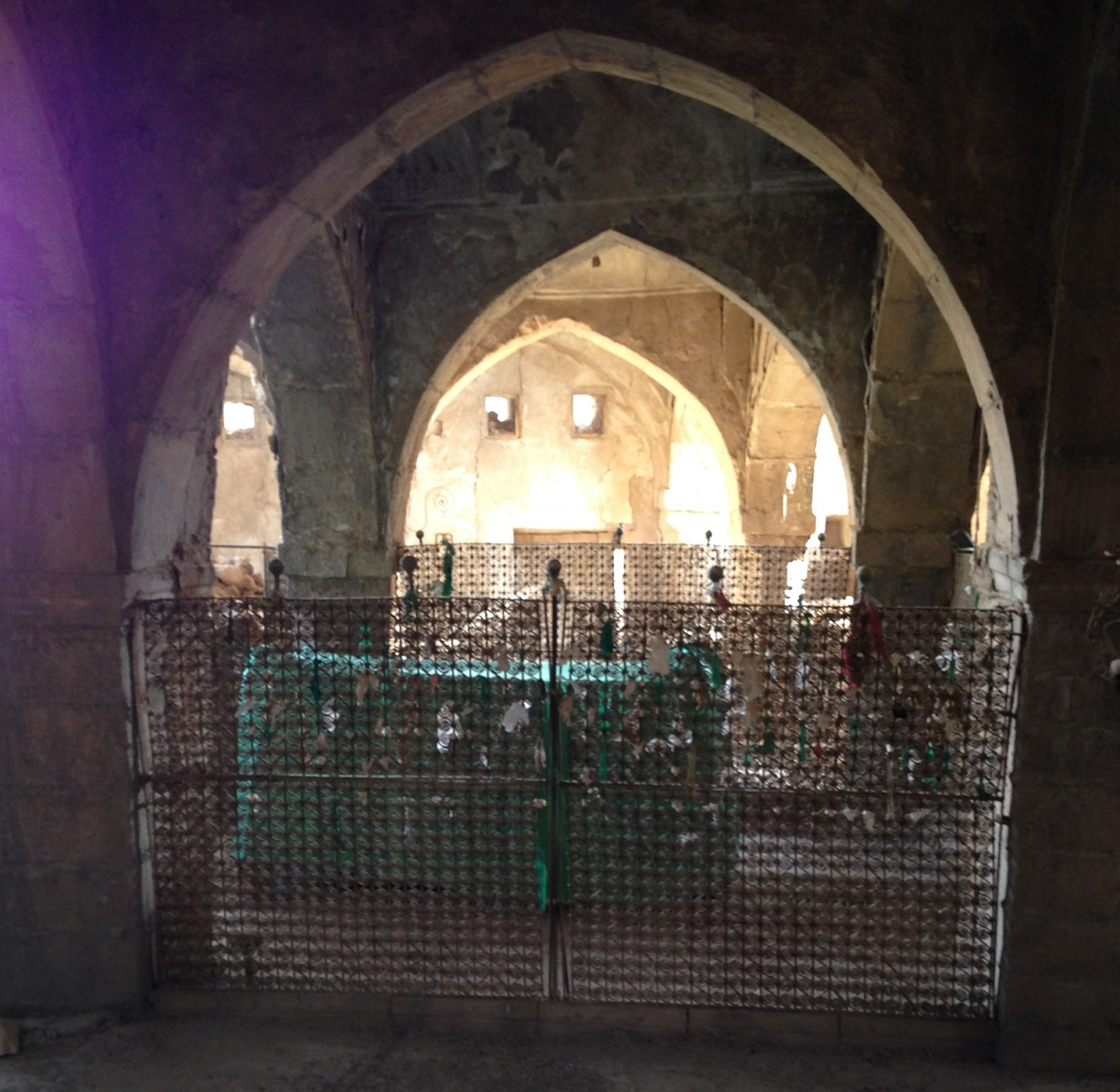
Tomb of the Prophet Nahum

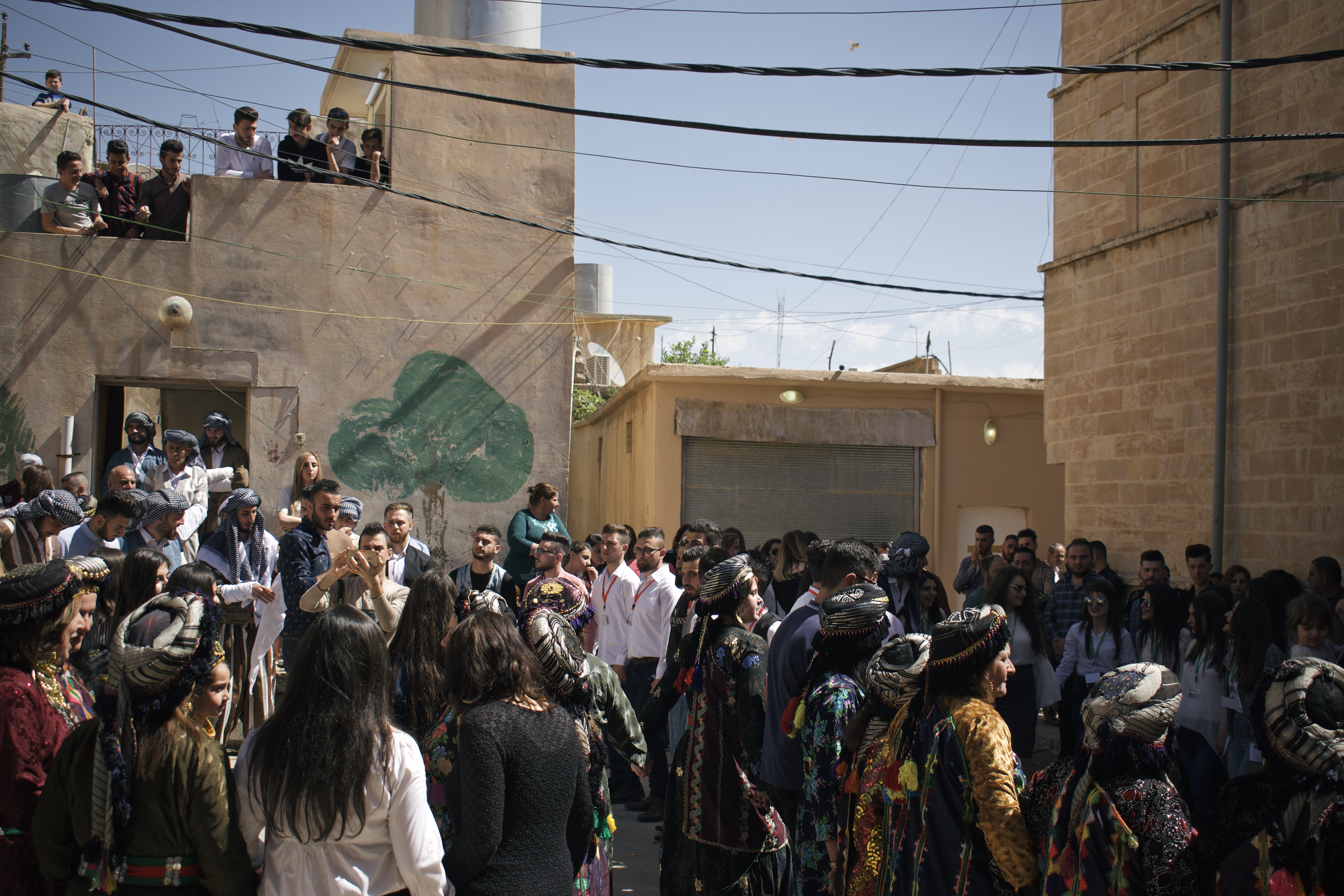
Palm Sunday 2018 in Alqosh

In the 17th and 18th centuries, the "legitimist" Alqosh patriarchal line from which Sulaqa broke away in 1552, drew closer to Rome, especially during the 58-year reign of Eliya XI/XII Denkha (1722−1778), who sent several letters to Rome, some with professions of faith in line with Catholic teaching, but no formal papal recognition followed. However, it was a member of the family from whom the "legitimate" traditionalist patriarchs were chosen, Yohannan Hormizd (1760–1838) who, having considered himself a Catholic since 1778, was chosen as patriarch of the Chaldean Catholic Church in 1830.

== Association with the Prophet Nahum ==
Austen Henry Layard, who visited the area in 1847, reported that by "a very ancient tradition" the village contains the tomb of the prophet Nahum, whose Old Testament book begins with: "An oracle concerning Nineveh. The book of the vision of Nahum of Elkosh." While Jerome located the birthplace of Nahum in Galilee, Layard considered the Alqosh tradition had some weight in spite of the lack of inscriptions or ancient remains. Iraqi Jews made pilgrimage to the site during Shavuot, and "He who has not made the pilgrimage to Nahum's tomb has not yet known real pleasure" was a common saying. When Jews were expelled from Iraq or voluntarily emigrated to Israel in 1948, the Jewish custodian entrusted the care of the building to a local Chaldean Catholic. A survey conducted in 2017 determined that the structure was in danger of collapse, and in the following year work began on stabilizing it.

== Attacks ==
- 1401 – the town was attacked and sacked by Timur (Tamerlane).
- 1508 – Alqosh was attacked by Pasha of Baghdad Bar Yak (Murad Bey).
- 1831 – the Soran Emirate attacked Alqosh, killing nearly 300 villagers.
- 1828 – Mosa Pasha, the governor of Amadiya, approached Alqosh and set fire to the Rabban Hormizd Monastery.
- 1832 – Muhammad Pasha of Rawanduz attacked Alqosh, killing over 600 of its inhabitants.
- 1840 – Resoul Beck, Mira Koor's brother, repeated the attack.
- 1843 – the Rabban Hormizd Monastery was attacked by the Kurds, and 1000 manuscripts may have been destroyed.
- 2014 – The Islamic State came close to Alqosh, and almost all of the people fled; however, many men and youths did not leave Alqosh due to a desire to protect their town. ISIL failed to take the town after the intervention of the Peshmerga and local Assyrian militia known as Dwekh Nawsha.

Old farming methods in Alqosh

== Demographics ==
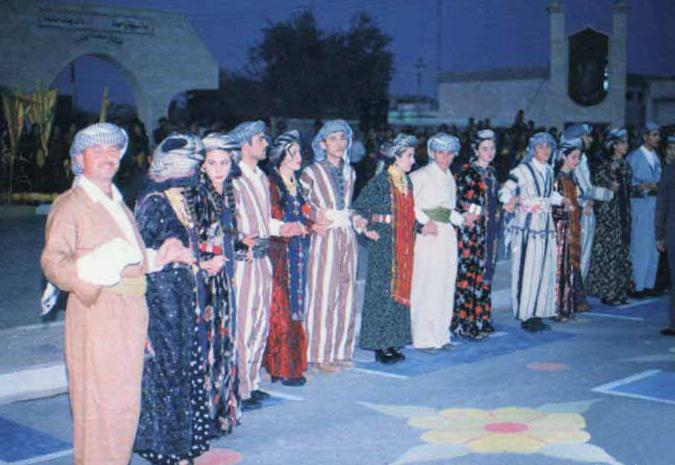
Party in Alqosh

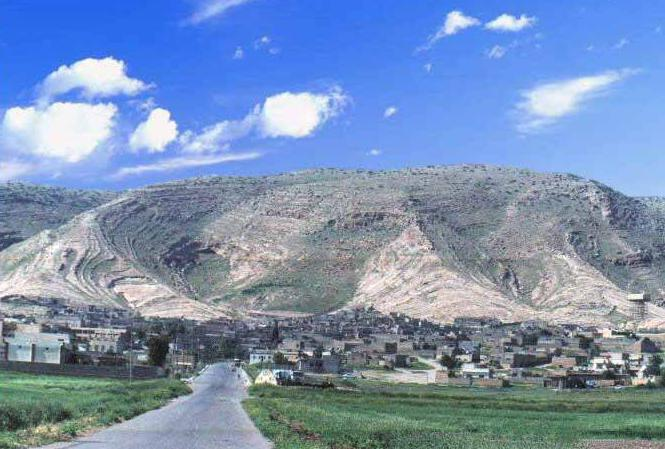
General view of Alqosh as of 2006

According to a CAPNI Organization report in January 2023, the residents of the Alqosh town were all Assyrian Christians, whereas in the broader Alqosh subdistrict, Yazidis made up 80% of the population. The town's residents abide by a rule where they are only allowed to sell their properties to other Assyrians originally from the village, which has managed to sustain their demographics up to now; typically, the men of the village are in charge of protecting it from outsiders.

In March 2020, Shlama Foundation reported that the town had a population of 4,567: 1,015 families of Chaldean Catholic denomination, the remainder being Assyrian Church of the East and Syriac Orthodox.

According to the Unrepresented Nations & Peoples Organization, most of the inhabitants are Assyrians, with a smaller percentage of Yazidis. In 1913, the town of Alqosh, was according to Joseph Tfinkdji inhabited by 7,000 Chaldean Catholics. Many have emigrated since the 1970s. It is estimated that at least 40,000 "Alqushnaye" immigrants and their 2nd and 3rd generation descendants now live in the cities of Detroit, Michigan, the western suburb of Fairfield in Sydney, Australia and San Diego, California.

In February 2010, the attacks against Assyrian people in northern Iraq forced 4,300 to flee from Mosul to the Nineveh Plains. A report by the United Nations stated that 504 Assyrians at once migrated to Alqosh. Many Assyrians of all denominations from Mosul and Baghdad since the post-2003 Iraq war have fled to Alqosh for safety. The town's population in 2020 is estimated to be roughly 4,600.

== Relations with the Kurdish regional government ==
In 2014 the mayor of Alqosh, Faiz Jahwareh, was detained and replaced by Kurdistan Democratic Party member Lara Zara, only to be reinstated after protests by Alqosh residents. Jahwareh was again detained and replaced by the Kurdish regional government in July 2017 on the basis of corruption charges that were dismissed by the Iraqi Federal Court.

== Climate ==
Alqosh has a semi-arid climate (BSh) with extremely hot and dry summers, and cool wet winters.

Climate data for Alqosh
Month	Jan	Feb	Mar	Apr	May	Jun	Jul	Aug	Sep	Oct	Nov	Dec	Year
Mean daily maximum °C (°F)	12 (54)	14 (57)	20 (68)	26 (79)	34 (93)	38 (100)	43 (109)	40 (104)	38 (100)	30 (86)	20 (68)	14 (57)	27 (81)
Mean daily minimum °C (°F)	2 (36)	4 (39)	8 (46)	11 (52)	16 (61)	21 (70)	25 (77)	24 (75)	20 (68)	14 (57)	6 (43)	4 (39)	13 (55)
Average precipitation mm (inches)	39 (1.5)	69 (2.7)	51 (2.0)	27 (1.1)	0 (0)	0 (0)	0 (0)	0 (0)	0 (0)	6 (0.2)	36 (1.4)	60 (2.4)	288 (11.3)
Average precipitation days	10	10	11	9	0	0	0	0	0	5	8	12	65
Source: World Weather Online (2000-2012)

== Notable people ==
- Hirmis Aboona (1940–2009), historian
- Joseph VI Audo (1790–1878), Patriarch of the Chaldean Catholic Church (1847–1878)
- Toma Audo (1854–1918), Archbishop of the Chaldean Catholic Archeparchy of Urmia (1890-1918)
- Paul II Cheikho (1906–1989), Patriarch of the Chaldean Catholic Church (1958–1989)
- Yohannan Hormizd (1760–1838), Patriarch of the Chaldean Catholic Church (1830–1838)
- Emil Shimoun Nona (1967–), Patriarch of the Chaldean Catholic Church (2026–)
- Toma Tomas (1924–1996), Assyrian nationalist and communist guerilla fighter
- Yousef VI Emmanuel II Thomas (1852–1947), Patriarch of the Chaldean Catholic Church (1900–1947)
- Lara Zara (1982–present), first female mayor of Alqosh and the first female mayor in the Nineveh Plains

== See also ==
- Assyrians in Iraq
- Assyrian homeland
- Disputed territories of Northern Iraq
- Proposals for Assyrian autonomy in Iraq
- List of Assyrian settlements

== Sources ==
- Frazee, Charles A. (2006) [1983]. Catholics and Sultans: The Church and the Ottoman Empire 1453–1923. Cambridge: Cambridge University Press. ISBN 978-0521027007.
- Addai Scher, Notice sur les manuscrits syriaques conservés dans la bibliothèque du couvent des Chaldéens de Notre-Dame-des-Semences, Journal Asiatique Sér. 10: 8, 9 (1906). This may be found online at Gallica by searching for "Journal Asiatique". An English translation of the first portion is at tertullian.org
