= Nahum =

Minor prophet in the Bible

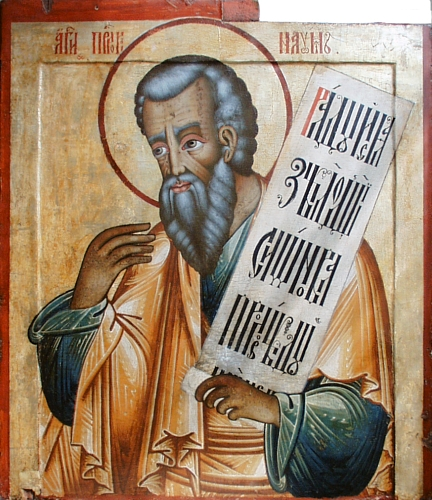
Russian Orthodox icon of Nahum, 18th century, the iconostasis of Transfiguration Church, Kizhi Island, Republic of Karelia.

Nahum (/ˈneɪ.əm/ or /ˈneɪhəm/; Hebrew: נַחוּם Naḥūm) is one of the Twelve Minor Prophets whose prophecy is recorded in the Hebrew Bible and the Old Testament. His book comes in chronological order between the Book of Micah and Habakkuk in the Bible. He wrote about the end of the Neo-Assyrian Empire, and its capital city, Nineveh, in a vivid poetic style.

== Life ==
Little is known about Nahum's personal history. His name means 'comfort', and is derived from the same root as the Hebrew verb meaning 'to comfort'. He may have come from the town of Alqosh in northern Mesopotamia (Nahum 1:1), however some scholars also attempted to connect 'Elkoshite' to Capernaum of northern Galilee. He was a very nationalistic Hebrew, however, and lived amongst the Elkoshites in peace. Nahum, called "the Elkoshite", is the seventh in order of the minor prophets. According to St. Jerome, Nahum's Elkosh was a little town in Galilee. This identification could explain how the famous New Testament city of Capernaum got its name.

Scholars with a preference for Hebrew manuscripts place Nahum's prophecy after the Assyrian king Ashurbanipal's Sack of Thebes in 663 BC. This view is the current majority opinion because the city of Thebes is referred to in the past tense in the Masoretic Text of Nahum 3:8–10. However, both the Septuagint and Vulgate refer to the city in the present tense, and the former opinion held by scholars was that Nahum lived about a century earlier, before both the captivity of the ten lost tribes and the Sack of Thebes. The first-century Jewish historian Flavius Josephus places Nahum's life during the reign of Jotham. This view was also held by the Catholic scholar Thomas Worthington in his notes for the original Douay-Rheims Bible, writing: "Nahum prophesied about 50 years after Jonah [...] 135 before the destruction of Niniveh." In this view, rather than Ashurbanipal, Nahum's prophecy would have been directed at Tiglath-Pileser III, who revitalized the Neo-Assyrian Empire into a world power again and conquered most of the Levant, defeating and subjugating previously influential kingdoms, including Aram-Damascus. Tiglath-Pileser was contemporary with the reign of Jotham.

== Works ==
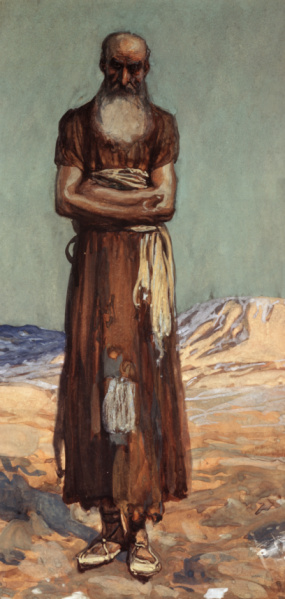
Nahum (watercolor circa 1888 by James Tissot)

Nahum's writings could be taken as prophecy or as history. One account suggests that his writings are a prophecy written in about 615 BCE, just before the downfall of Assyria, while another account suggests that he wrote this passage as liturgy just after its downfall in 612 BCE.

The book was introduced in Reformation theologian John Calvin's Commentaries on Twelve Minor Prophets as a complete and finished poem:

No one of the minor Prophets seems to equal the sublimity, the vehemence and the boldness of Nahum: besides, his Prophecy is a complete and finished poem; his exordium is magnificent, and indeed majestic; the preparation for the destruction of Nineveh, and the description of its ruin, and its greatness, are expressed in most vivid colors, and possess admirable perspicuity and fulness.

— Rev. John Owen, translator, Calvin's Commentary on Jonah, Micah, Nahum

There are indications that an acrostic underlies the present text. Thus 1:2 begins with the first letter of the alphabet (א), verse 3b ('in whirlwind') with the second letter (ב), verse 4 with the third (ג), and so on until from 10 to 16 of the 22 letters have appeared. In places the scheme breaks down: in the process of transmission, what was once an alphabetic poem has now been seriously corrupted, rearranged, and supplemented.

Nahum, taking words from Moses himself, has shown in a general way what sort of "Being God is". Calvin argued that Nahum painted God by which his nature must be seen, and "it is from that most memorable vision, when God appeared to Moses after the breaking of the tablets."

Although all three chapters fall below the standards set by the developed Judaeo-Christian tradition concerning the nature of God and man's relation with his brother man [...] it is one of the world's classic rebukes of militarism [...] All tyrants are doomed. They make enemies of those whom they attack and oppress; they become corrupt, dissolute, drunken, effeminate; they are lulled into false security [...]

— Charles L. Taylor, Jr.

== Tomb ==
Tomb of Nahum
- נַחוּם
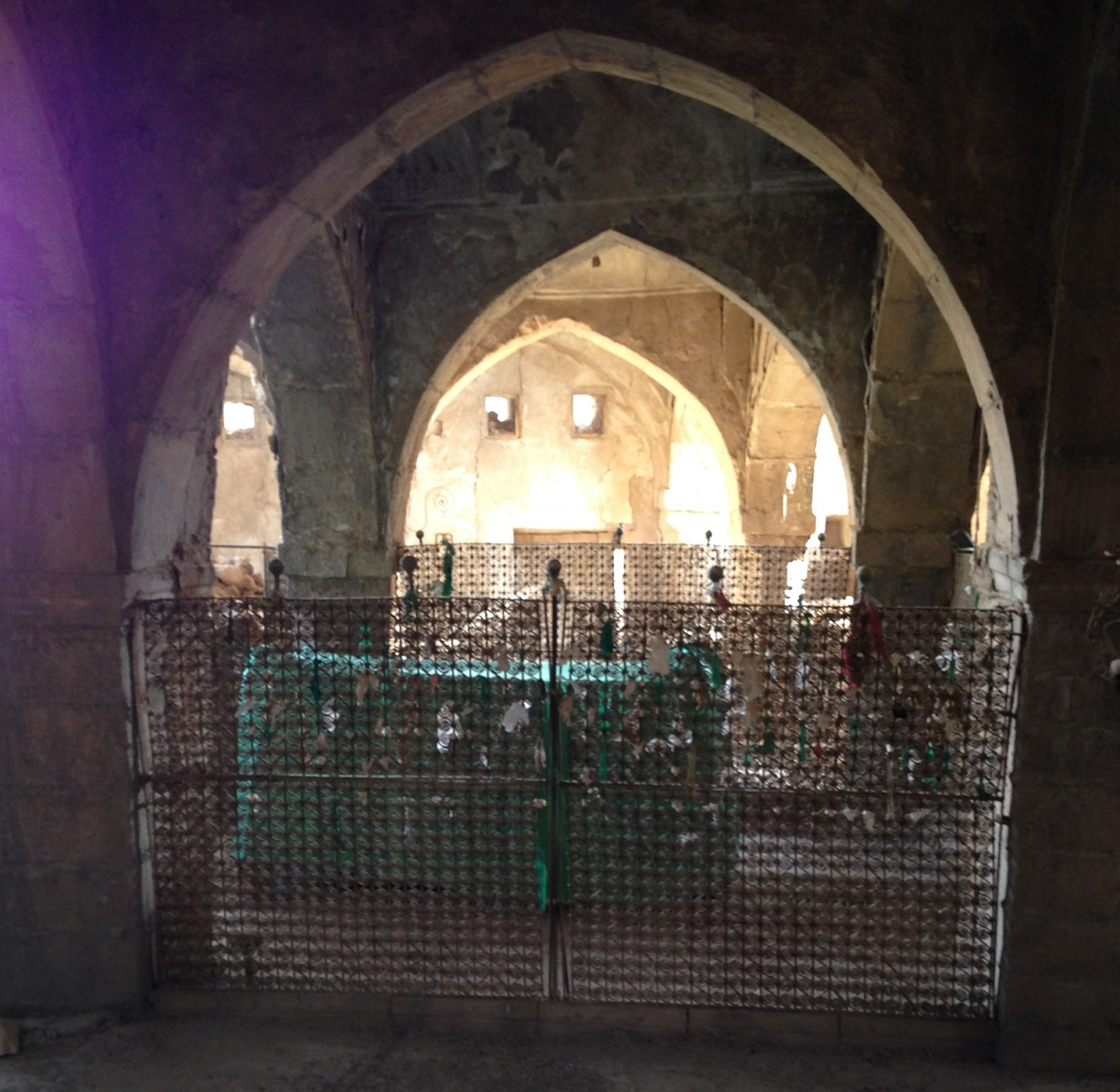
- Tomb of Nahum

- Location within Iraq
- 36°44′18.87″N 43°05′45″E
- Type: Shrine to the biblical prophet Nahum
- Cultures: Assyrian, Jewish
- Location: Town of Alqosh, Northern Iraq, 50 km (31 mi) north of Mosul

Site notes
- Excavation dates: None
- Condition: Partial collapse, stabilized in 2018
- Public access: yes

The tomb of Nahum is supposedly inside the synagogue at Alqosh, although there are other places outside Iraq which also lay claim to being the original "Elkosh" from which Nahum hailed. Alqosh was emptied of its Jewish population in 1948, and the synagogue that houses the tomb is now in a poor structural state, to the extent that the tomb itself is in danger of destruction. The Christian population, Alqoshites, protected the Jewish members by negotiating their expulsion rather than their extermination. As they were being expelled from the land, the Alqoshi Christians helped the Jewish population escape to Israel. The tomb underwent basic repairs in 1796. When all Jews were forced to flee Alqosh in 1948, the iron keys to the tomb were handed to an Assyrian man, Sami Jajouhana. Few Jews visit the historic site, yet Jajouhana continues to keep the promise he made with his Jewish friends, and looks after the tomb.

In 1832 the tomb of Nahum was destroyed during an attack in Alqosh by Kurdish soldiers of the Soran Emirate.

As of early 2017, the tomb was in significant disrepair and was threatened by the rise of ISIS in Iraq. A team of engineers conducted a survey of the tomb and determined that the tomb was in danger of imminent collapse and might not survive another winter. A team led by the U.S.-based non-profit Alliance for the Restoration of Cultural Heritage ("ARCH") raised the funds necessary to stabilize the site. After raising the necessary funds, ARCH partnered with the Prague-based GEMA ART International s.r.o., experts in historic preservation and reconstruction to do the immediate stabilization work. Following coordination with local partners, the initial stabilization work was completed in January 2018. The stabilization work is expected to prevent further deterioration of the structure for between two and three years. With the tomb and its surrounding structure stabilized, ARCH is planning on raising the funding necessary to fully restore the site. On 26 April 2019, the United States government announced that it would contribute $500,000 to restore the tomb.

Two other possible burial sites mentioned in historical accounts are Elkesi, near Rameh in the Galilee and Elcesei in the West Bank.

== Liturgical commemoration ==
The prophet Nahum is venerated as a saint in Eastern Christianity. On the Eastern Orthodox liturgical calendar, his feast day is December 1 (for those churches which follow the traditional Julian Calendar, December 1 currently falls on December 14 of the modern Gregorian Calendar). He is commemorated with the other minor prophets in the calendar of saints of the Armenian Apostolic Church on July 31.
