= Khatarah =

- Town
- Location within Iraq
- Coordinates: 36°39′42″N 43°2′25″E
- Country: Iraq
- Region: Kurdistan Region (de facto)
- Governorate: Nineveh Governorate (de jure); Dohuk Governorate (de facto)
- District: Tel Kaif District

Population (2014)
  - Total: 14,000
- Time zone: GMT +3
  - Summer (DST): GMT +4

Khatarah (Arabic: ختاره, Kurdish: خه‌تارێ, romanized: Xetarê, alternatively spelled Khatare or Hatarah) is a town located in the Tel Kaif District of the Ninawa Governorate in northern Iraq. It is located 50 kilometres (31 mi) north of Mosul in the Nineveh Plains. It belongs to the disputed territories of Northern Iraq.

Khatarah has a mainly Yazidi population.

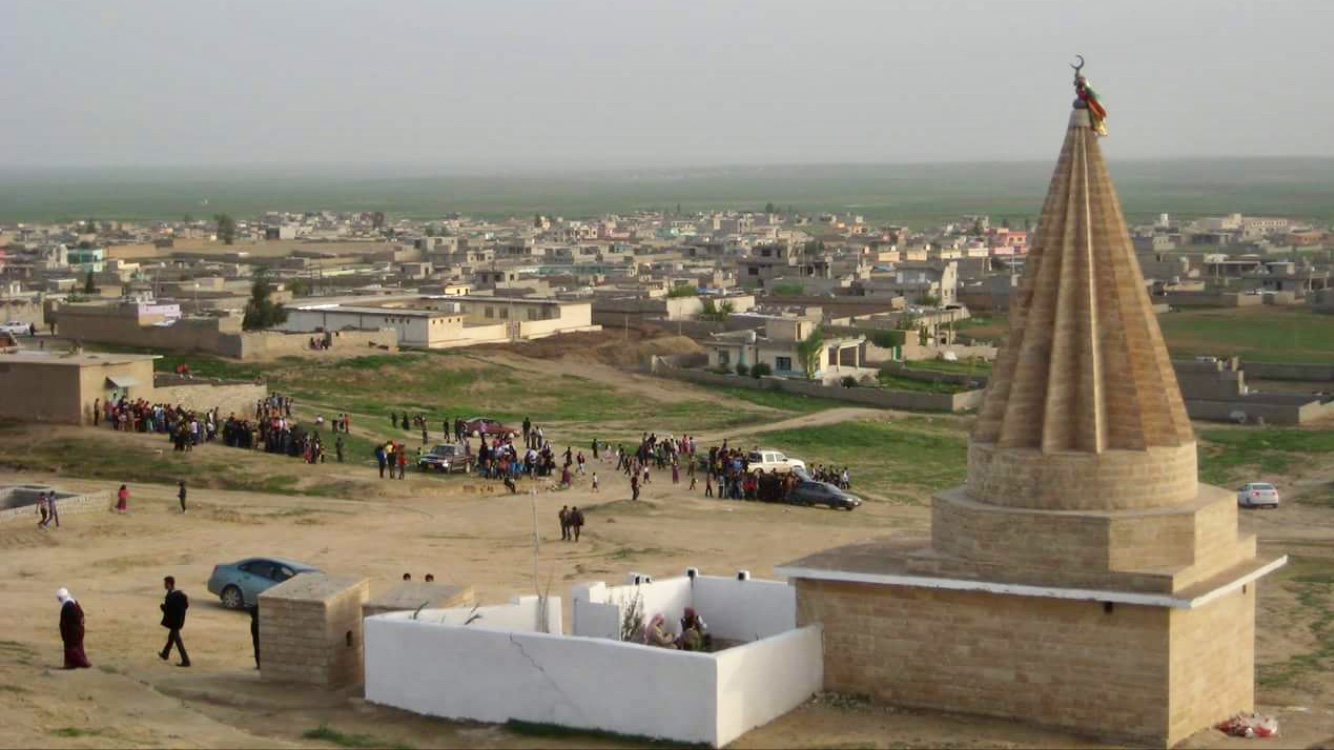
Yazidi temple in Khatarah
