= Soran University =

Public university in Soran, Iraq

- زانکۆی سۆران
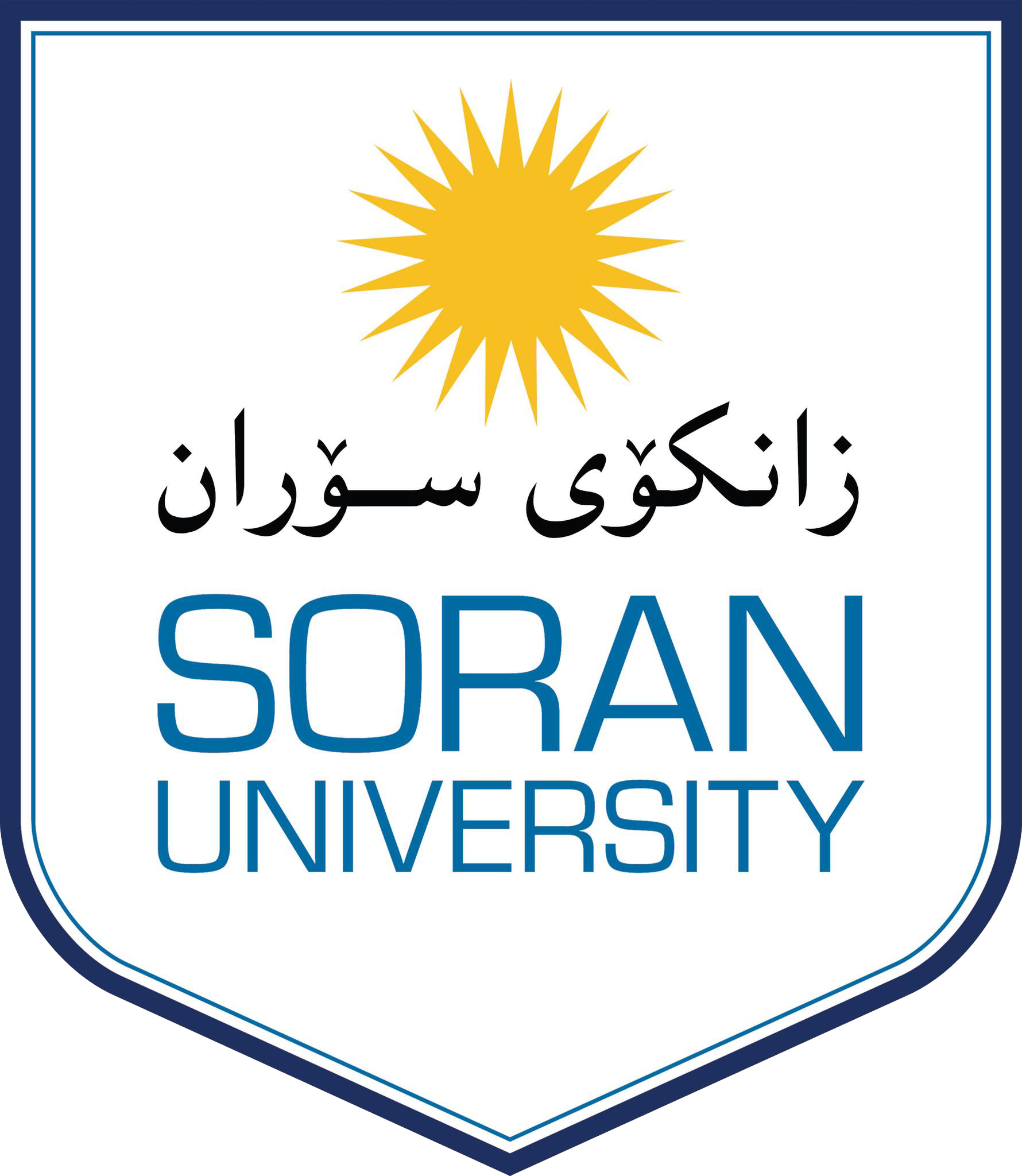
- Motto: Towards The Future
- Type: Public university
- Established: 2009; 17 years ago
- Chancellor: Dr. Sherwan Sharif Qurtas
- President: Asst. Prof. Dr. Sherwan Sharif Qurtas
- Vice-president: Asst. Prof. Dr. Sherzad Saeed Sedeeq, Prof. Dr. Sirwan Zand, Dr. Rizgar Saed Hussein
- Location: Soran, Erbil Province, Iraqi Kurdistan; 36.6968°N 44.5289°E
- Campus: 350.000 m²; Suburban
- Colors: Blue, white, and yellow
- Website: main.soran.edu.iq

Soran University (SU) (Kurdish: زانکۆی سۆران) is a KRG sponsored public university, founded in 2009. It is located in Soran, Kurdistan Region.

== Faculties ==
SU has five faculties:

- Faculty of Arts
- Faculty of Law
- Faculty of Science
- Faculty of Education
- Faculty of Engineering (Civil, Petroleum, Chemical) Engineering

== Staff ==
Key staff members include:

1. President: Asst. Prof. Dr. Sherwan Sharif Qurtas

- Vice-president for Administrative and Financial affairs: Asst. Prof. Dr. Sherzad Saeed Sedeeq
- Vice-president for scientific affairs: Prof. Dr. Sirwan Zand
- Vice-president for Students' affairs : Dr. Rizgar Saed Hussein
- Asst. Prof. Dr. Ayad Nuri Faqi Dean of Faculty of Science
- Dr. Ali Yousif Azeez Dean of Faculty of Education
- Dr. Himdad Faysal Ahmad Dean of Faculty of Law
- Dr. Jamal Ismael Kakrasul Dean of Faculty of Engineering
- Prof. Dr. Samir Mustafa Dean of Scientific Research Centre

== See also ==
- List of universities in Iraq
