= Soran Emirate =

Former Kurdish state

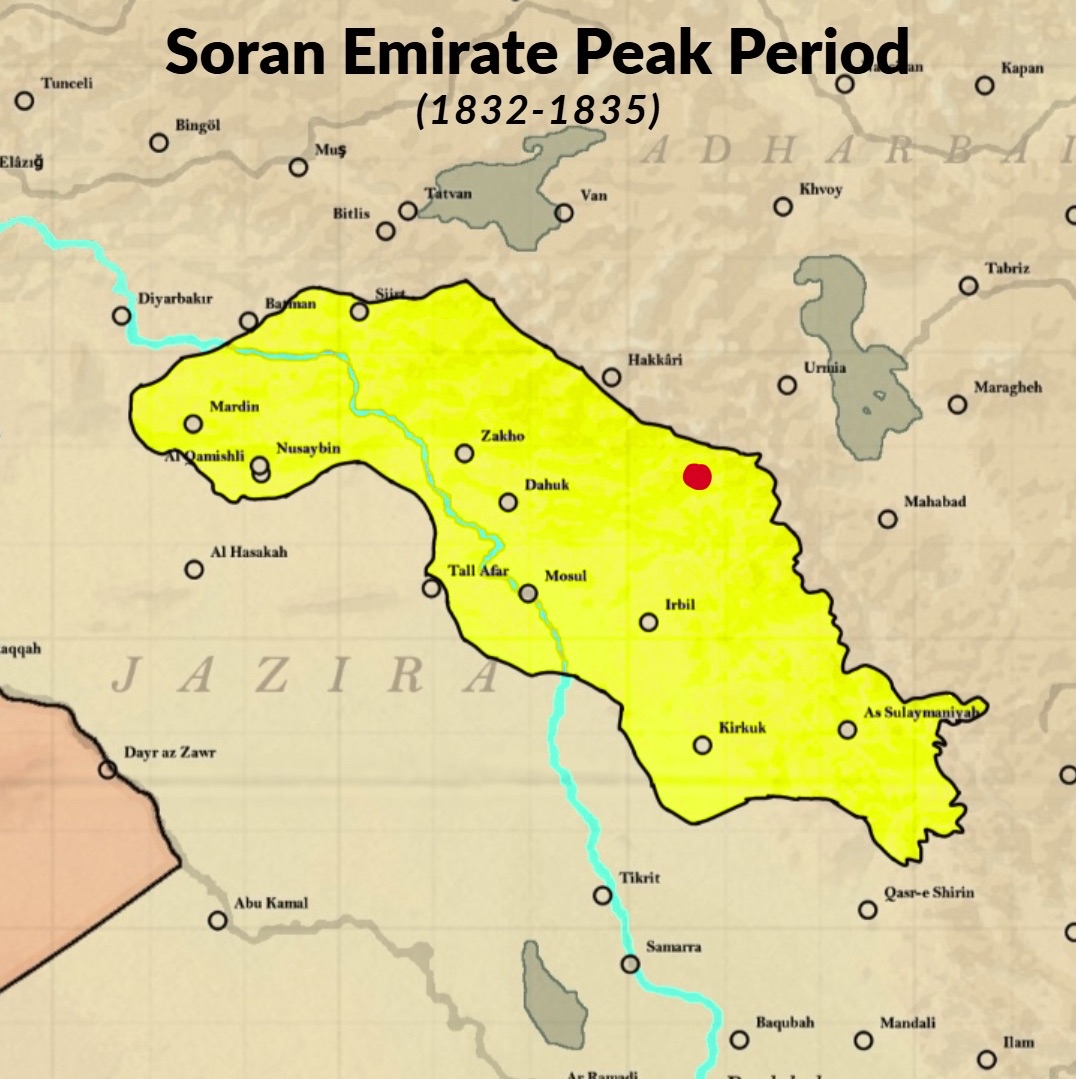
- Map of the Soran Emirate during the peak of Mir Muhammad's rule (c. 1832–1835)
- Official languages: Arabic
- Common languages: Kurdish
- Religion: Islam (State religion) Others: Yazidism, Judaism, Christianity
  - 1816–1836: Mir Muhammad

Establishment
  - Established: ~1330s–1430s
  - Dissolved: 1847
Succeeded by
Ottoman Empire
- Today part of: Turkey, Iraq, Syria, Iran

The Soran Emirate (Kurdish: میرنشینی سۆران) was a Kurdish emirate established before the conquest of Kurdistan by the Ottoman Empire in 1514, and later revived by Emir Muhammad and centered in Rawandiz from 1816 to 1838.

== Origins ==
According to the Sharafnama (1597) by Sharafkhan Bidlisi, the emirate traced its lineage to a Bedouin Arab noble man from Baghdad named Kelos, who settled in the village of Hewdeyan in the Ewan district within the borders of Soran. Initially, Kelos worked as a shepherd for the villagers. Kelos had lost his front teeth, and in the dialect of the local people, "Kelos" referred to someone who lacked their front teeth, thus the name stuck with him.

Kelos had three sons: Isa, Ibrahim, and Sheikh Uveys. Isa was described as noble, gentle, and eloquent, and was known for distributing his earnings to the poor and destitute of the village, which earned him a devoted following. When the ruler of the region mobilized his forces against a powerful enemy, Isa joined the campaign with his followers. His companions mockingly bestowed upon him the title of "Emir," but following demonstrations of his capability in battle, the local population formally recognized him as their ruler. Isa and his followers subsequently moved to capture the Ewan Fortress.

Sharafnama recounts that the area surrounding the fortress was characterized by bare, hard red rocks. Isa and his men were the first to scale the rocks and engage the defenders, and their valor in battle led to them being named Seng-Surh, Kurdish for "people of the red rocks." Through common usage, and owing to the Kurdish rendering of the Persian surh ("red") as sohr, the name evolved into Sohran, the name of the emirate. Following a successful siege, Isa governed the region until his death, after which his son Shah Ali succeeded him.

== Early years ==
Qadir Muhammad Muhammad writes that the emirate was likely established sometime between the 1330s and 1430s.

Years later, during the Battle of Chaldiran in 1514 between the Ottomans and the Safavids, the Emirate was able to conquer land between Erbil and Kirkuk. Following the Ottoman conquest of Baghdad in 1534, Sultan Suleiman the Magnificent ordered the assassination of Izzeddin Sher, the ruler of Erbil and son of Shah Ali, and appointed the Yazidi leader Mîr Husên Beg Dasini as the emir of Erbil in the spring of 1535. Contemporary Ottoman sources suggest that the removal of Izzeddîn Sher was motivated by his secret support for the Safavids, despite professed loyalty to the Ottoman state.

Soon after, Mir Husên Beg Dasini faced resistance from Mir Seyfeddin, son of Mîr Husên of Soran, who initially sought refuge with the Emir of Ardalan but later successfully reclaimed much of the former Soran territories. Despite Mir Husên Beg’s efforts, conflicts between Mîr Seyfeddîn and the Ottomans continued for years. Ottoman records indicate that Husên Beg was replaced as Sanjakbeg of Erbil by Ferhad Beg before 1544. After his service in Erbil, Mîr Husên Beg Dasinî continued to hold various Ottoman administrative positions. Contrary to claims in Sharafname that he was executed in Istanbul, Ottoman documents indicate that he later served as emir of Bitlis, with records mentioning him in 1556–1558, including a request for a timar for his son Ali Beg.

== Under Mir Muhammad ==
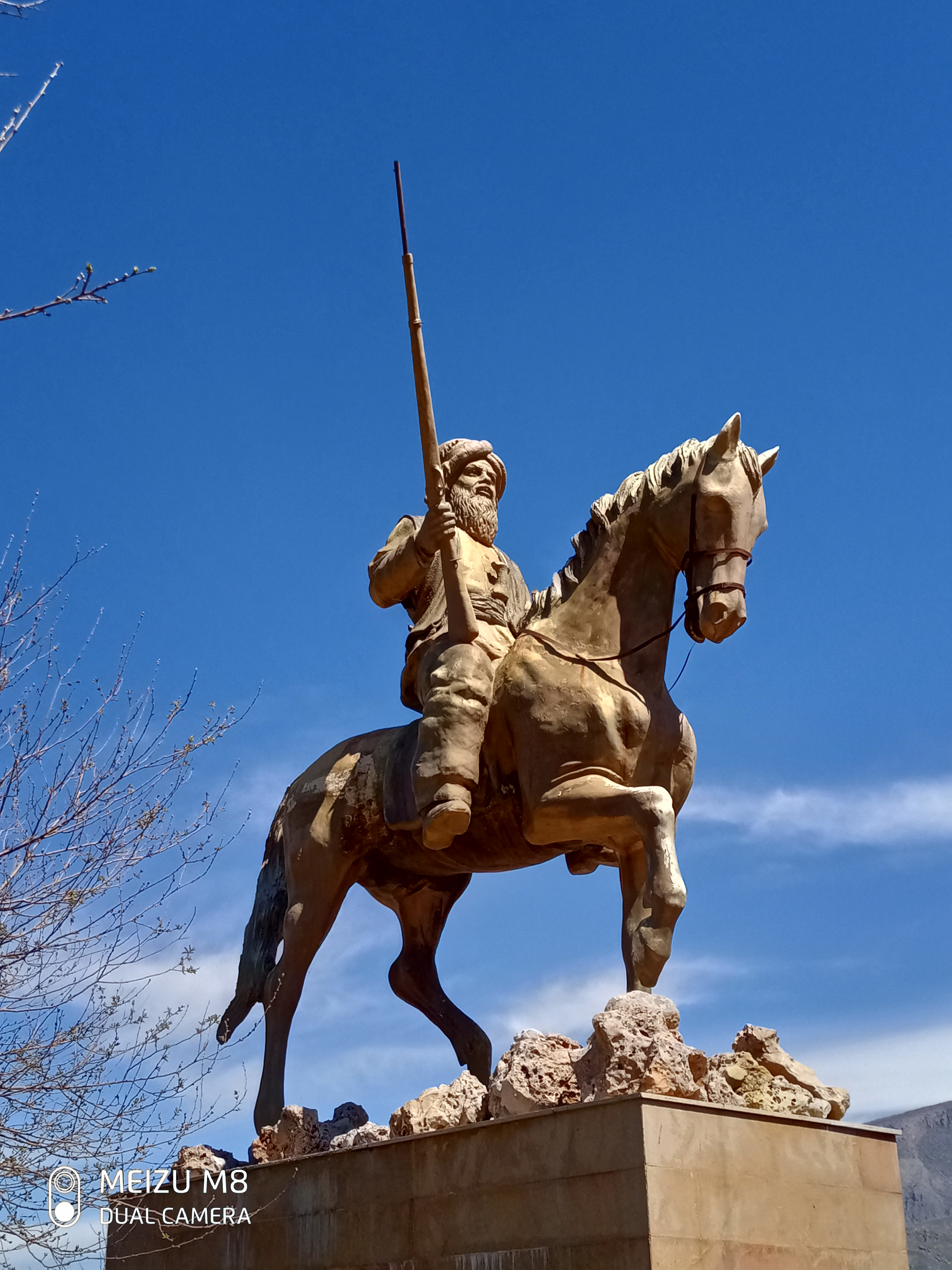
The statue of Mir Muhammad of Rawanduz in Rawanduz

The last prince of the emirate was Mir Muhammad of Rawanduz, who reigned from 1813 to 1836. His father, Mustafa Beg, peacefully handed the princedom to him. In the first few years of his rule, he consolidated his power and began launching attacks toward the neighboring principality of Baban. He occupied Harir in 1822, Koy Sanjaq, Altun Kupri, Erbil in 1823, Akre, Ranya in 1824. This established the Zab river as the border between the two emirates.

As the region experienced a power vacuum due to the decline of Baban, the Russo-Turkish War from 1828 to 1829, and the Egyptian–Ottoman War from 1831 to 1833, he led a tribal force to Rawandiz and built a citadel in the town as they build up a military. Between 1831 and 1834 he was able to capture several towns and cities in other Kurdish emirates. 1831 he captured the Bahdinan emirate of Amedi. Kor further expanded his influence to Mardin, Cizre and Nusaybin, compelling the ruler of the Bohtan Mir Sevdin, to accept his authority, which caused serious concern in the Ottoman capital Constantinople. Kor then captured Akre and oppressed Yazidis in the newly-conquered areas.

Under Emir Kor, the Soran emirate developed a powerful army. It consisted of between 30 and 50,000 tribal musketeers who were given regular salaries, having the appearance of a national army. Kor himself ate each evening with 100-200 soldiers from different tribes. A multitude of different tribes joined his army such as the Baliki, Rewendek, Sidek, Shirwani, Rusuri, Malibas, Muzuri, Sheikhab, Nurik, Kheilani, Khoshnaw, Hnearai, Herki, Sheikh Mahmudi, Kassan, Derijiki, Bamami, Sekw, Shikuli, Mendik, Baimar, Balak, and Piraji.

Kor tried to subdue the Assyrians of Lower Tyari in 1834 but suffered a major defeat near the village of Lezan. The defeat prompted the Ottomans to reassess the perceived strength of the emirate and to make plans for its conquest.

Fearing a cooperation between the Soran Emirate and Muhammad Ali of Egypt, the Ottomans dispatched an army to Soran in 1834. Mire Kor was able to repeal the forces and push towards Iran. This led Kurdish notables from Bradost, Akre and Amedi to complain to Reşid Mehmed Pasha of the Ottoman government alleging they were oppressed by Mir Kor of Soran.

After having pressured to surrender by the situation, Emir Kor travelled to Istanbul for negotiations, where he was given authority over the area of the Emirate of Soran. But on his way home he disappeared in the Black Sea area and the Ottoman Empire supported his brother Rasul as the Emir of the Emirate. The Emirate would ultimately fall victim to the growing centralization of the Ottoman Empire.

== Kurdish awareness ==
There were traits of Kurdish awareness by the Soran Emirate including the desire to unite all Kurdish areas under one rule and the use of Kurdish uniforms for his army. On this, Emir Kor's brother Rasul told British writer and traveller Frederick Milingen:

With an aspiring genius he had conceived the grande idée of emancipating his country from the authority of the sultans, and of consolidating the power of his family. Uniting the qualities of a conqueror and of a legislator, Mehemet Pasha succeeded in extending his sway over the neighbouring provinces of Kerkuk[sic] and Mussul [sic], and in gathering under his flag a large number of Koordish [sic] troop.

Moreover, researcher Ghalib writes:

[T]hrough many centuries of Ottoman rule, they [Kurds] could not build up a sense of community between the Kurds and the dominant ruler. Kurds remembered their happiness under Soran and other Kurdish emirates. Therefore, they did not welcome the Ottoman officials. Remembering the past is important for keeping one’s own history in mind.

== See also ==
- Yazidi genocide by the Soran Emirate (1832-1834)
- Mir Muhammed Rebellion
- List of Kurdish dynasties and countries
- Mir Xanzad

== Bibliography ==
- Ebraheem, Sharameen (2013), The Impact of Architectural Identity on Nation Branding: The Case Study of Iraqi Kurdistan. (PDF), Manchester Metropolitan University's Research Repository
- Eppel, Michael (2016), A People Without a State, The Kurds from the Rise of Islam to the Dawn of Nationalism, Routledge, ISBN 978-1-4773-0911-7
- Eppel, Michael (2018), "The Kurdish emirates", Routledge Handbook on the Kurds, Routledge Handbooks Online, pp. 35–47, doi:10.4324/9781315627427-4, ISBN 978-1-138-64664-3, S2CID 186808301
- Ghalib, Sabah Abdullah (2011), The Emergence of Kurdism with Special Reference to the Three Kurdish Emirates within the Ottoman Empire, 1800-1850 (PDF), University of Exeter
- Millingen, Frederick (1870), Wild Life Among the Koords, Hurst and Blackett
- Mustafa, Amanj Ahmad (2019), سیاسه‌تی ده‌وڵه‌تی عوسمانی به‌رانبه‌ر میرنشینی سۆران له‌ سه‌رده‌می میر محه‌مه‌دی ڕەواندزید (-) (in Kurdish and English), Soran University, doi:10.31918/twejer.1923.10
