= List of massacres in Turkey =

The following is a list of massacres that occurred within what became the borders of present-day Turkey:

== Antiquity ==
Name	Date	Location	Deaths	Responsible Party	Victims	Notes
Fall of Miletus	494 BC	Miletus	Most Milesian men	Persian Empire	Greeks	
Battle of Aegospotami	405 BC	Aegospotami	3,000	Sparta	Athenian sailors	3,000 Athenian sailors executed
Fall of Sestos	353 BC	Sestos	All males of Sestos	Athens	Greeks	
Asiatic Vespers	88 BC	Asia (Roman province)	80,000–150,000	Mithridates VI of Pontus	Romans and Italians	

== Middle Ages ==
Name	Date	Location	Deaths	Responsible Party	Victims	Notes
Nika Revolt	January 532	Constantinople	30,000	Byzantine Empire	Rioters	About thirty thousand rioters were reportedly killed.
Sack of Amorium	August 838	Amorium	30,000–70,000	Abbasid Caliphate	Byzantines	
Battle of Levounion	29 April 1091	Enez	tens of thousands	Byzantine Empire & Cumans	Pechenegs	The Pechenegs consisting of 80,000 warriors and their families invaded the Byzantine Empire. Near Enez they were ambushed by a combined Byzantine and Cuman army, fighting soon turned into wholesale slaughter. Warriors and civilians were killed and the Pecheneg people were nearly wiped out.
Siege of Antioch	3 June 1098	Antioch	Muslim and Christian population	Crusaders	Muslim and Christian population	
Massacre of the Latins	May 1182	Constantinople	Uncertain – tens of thousands	Byzantine mob	Roman Catholics	The bulk of the Latin community, estimated at over 60,000 at the time, was wiped out or forced to flee; some 4,000 survivors were sold as slaves to the Turks. The massacre further worsened relations and increased enmity between the Western and Eastern Christian churches, and a sequence of hostilities between the two followed.
Siege of Constantinople (1204)	8–13 April 1204	Constantinople	2,000	Crusaders	Byzantines	The city was sacked and looted.
Fall of Constantinople	1453	Constantinople	4,000	Ottomans	Byzantines	4,000 persons of both sexes and all ages were massacred during these days. Moreover, the dwellings and the churches were plundered. Some 30,000 were enslaved.
Siege of Trebizond	1461	Trabzon		Ottomans	Trebizonds	

== Ottoman Empire ==
=== Before 1914 ===
Name	Date	Location	Deaths	Responsible Party	Victims	Notes
Massacres during the Greek War of Independence	1821–1829	Ottoman Empire	Unknown	Ottoman government and Greek rebels	Greeks, Turks, Albanians and Jews	Massacres were committed by both sides during the conflict.
Massacres of Badr Khan	1843-1846	Hakkari	10,000-15,000	Kurdish Emirs of Bhutan, Badr Khan and Nurullah	Assyrians	Many who were not killed were sold into slavery. 1826 Janissaries massacred by government (link to Auspicious Incident).
Hamidian massacres	1894–1896	Eastern Ottoman Empire	80,000–300,000	Ottoman Empire; Hamidiye, Turkish, Kurdish tribes Circassian troops Laz troops	Armenians	
Massacres of Diyarbakır (1895)	1895	Diyarbakır Vilayet	25,000	Young Turks and Kurdish irregulars	Armenians and Assyrians	
Adana massacre	April 1909	Adana Vilayet	20,000	local Turkish nationalist activist, conservative reactionary to Young Turk government	Armenians	
Ethnic cleansing of Turks in Edirne during First Balkan War	October 1912-June 1913	Edirne Vilayet	5,000 (excluding Edeköy Massacre)	Bulgarian army	Turks	
Havsa Massacre	1912	Havsa in Edirne Vilayet	10	Bulgarian army	Turks	Turkish quarter was almost entirely burnt.
Edeköy Massacre	November 1912	Edeköy (nowadays Kadıdondurma) in Edirne Vilayet	Thousands	Bulgarian army	Turks	Many incidents of torture and robbery.
Destruction of Thracian Bulgarians	1913	Thrace; Bulgarköy, Edirne	60,000	Young Turk government, Ottoman army	Bulgarians	

=== World War I (1914–1918) ===
Name	Date	Location	Deaths	Responsible Party	Victims	Notes
Greek genocide	1917–1922	Ottoman Empire	300,000–900,000	Young Turk government	Greeks	Reports detail massacres, deportations, individual killings, rapes, burning of entire Greek villages, destruction of Greek Orthodox churches and monasteries, drafts for "Labor Brigades", looting, terrorism and other atrocities.
Assyrian genocide	1914–1918	Ottoman Empire and Persia	250,000-275,000	Young Turk government and Kurdish tribes	Assyrians	Denied by the Turkish government.
Armenian genocide	1915–1917	Ottoman Empire	600,000-1,500,000	Young Turk government and Kurdish tribes	Armenians	The Armenians of the eastern regions of the empire were massacred. The Turkish government currently denies the genocide. It is the second most publicised case of genocide after the Holocaust.
Seventy-second firman of the Yazidis	1915-1917	Ottoman Empire	300,000-500,000	Young Turk government and Kurdish tribes	Yazidis	The Yazidis were killed in mass, deported and forcefully converted to Islam, nearly wiped out their population.
Massacres in Eastern Anatolia	1914-1918	Eastern Anatolia	128,000-600,000	Russian Army and possibly Armenian irregulars Assyrian volunteers	Muslim population (Turks and Kurds)	According to J. Rummel, 128,000-600,000 Muslim Turks and Kurds were killed (death toll includes death by famine and diseases) by Russian troops and possibly Armenian irregulars and Assyrians during World War I.
Massacres in the Çoruh River valley	1916	Çoruh River valley	45,000	Cossack regiments	Muslim population (Turks and Kurds)	During WWI, Russian "General Liakhov, for instance 'accused the Muslims of treachery, and sent his Cossacks from Batum with orders to kill every native at sight, and burn every village and every mosque. And very efficiently had they performed their task, for as we passed up the Chorokh valley to Artvin not a single habitable dwelling or a single living creature did we see.'"

=== Post-World War I (1919–1923) ===
Name	Date	Location	Deaths	Responsible Party	Victims	Notes
Massacre in Marash	1920	Marash, Aleppo Vilayet	5,000–12,000	Turks	Armenians	
Kahyaoğlu Farm Massacre	June 11, 1920	Yeşiloba, Adana Vilayet	64+ to ~200	Armenians	Turks	Report which was given to Mustafa Kemal Pasha included 43 men, 21 women and tens of children. Other estimates are up to 200.
Karadeniz massacre	January 28–29, 1921	waters of the Black Sea	15	Kemalists/Committee of Union and Progress (disputed)	Communist Party of Turkey	Mustafa Suphi the founder of the Communist Party of Turkey and his 14 comrades were assassinated while they were being sent to Erzurum for trial
Cabar Massacre	April 1–2 1921	Cabar,Denizli	83	Kingdom of Greece	Turks	

== Republic of Turkey (1923–present) ==
Name	Date	Location	Deaths	Responsible Party	Victims	Notes
Zilan massacre	July 1930	Van Province	5,000–15,000	Turkish security forces	Kurds	5,000 women, children, and elderly people were reportedly killed
1934 Thrace pogroms	21 June-4 July 1934	Thrace	1	Local people	Jews	Over 15,000 Jews had to flee from region
Dersim rebellion	Summer 1937-Spring 1938	Tunceli Province	13,806–70,000	Turkish security forces	Alevi Kurds/Zazas	The killings have been condemned by some as an ethnocide or genocide
Zini Rift Massacre	6 August 1938	Erzincan Province	95	Turkish security forces	Kurds	
Muğlalı incident	July 1943	Van Province	32	Turkish security forces	Kurds	33 Kurdish villagers were extrajudicially executed by General Mustafa Muğlalı for allegedly smuggling livestock, one of them escaped.
Karahan village massacre	October 1944	Van Province	6	Turkish security forces	Kurds	6 Kurdish villagers were extrajudicially executed by General Mustafa Muğlalı. This was the second massacre of Muğlalı, with the possibility of more uncovered massacres having been committed.
Istanbul pogrom	6–7 September 1955	Istanbul	13–30	Turkish government	primarily Greeks, as well as Armenians, Jews	The killings are identified as genocidal by Alfred-Maurice de Zayas. Many of the non-Muslim minorities, mostly Greek Christians, forced to leave Turkey. Several churches are demolished by explosives.
Taksim Square massacre	May 1, 1977	Taksim Square in Istanbul	34-42	Some unidentified armed people	Leftist demonstrators, civilians	
Beyazıt massacre	March 16, 1978	Istanbul	7	Grey Wolves, Turkish deep state (alleged)	Leftist university students	Cemil Sönmez, Baki Ekiz, Hatice Özen, Abdullah Şimşek, Murat Kurt, Hamdi Akıl and Turan Ören were killed and 41 others were injured by a bomb that was followed by gunfire March 16, 1978.
Ümraniye massacre	March 17, 1978	Ümraniye in Istanbul	5	Communist Party of Turkey/Marxist–Leninist	Grey Wolves affiliated workers	Grey Wolves claim that the victims were badly tortured. Reaction to the aforementioned Beyazıt massacre.
Malatya massacre	April 17, 1978	Malatya Province	8	Grey Wolves, Salafists	Alevi Turks	Grey Wolves and salafists attacked Alevi regions of city after assassination of Hamit Fendoğlu leaving 8 dead, including 3 children and 100 wounded. 1000 shops were looted and destroyed.
Balgat massacre	August 10, 1978	Çankaya, Ankara	5	Grey Wolves	Civilians (claimed that they were leftist)	
Bahçelievler massacre	October 9, 1978	Bahçelievler, Ankara	7	Grey Wolves	Workers' Party of Turkey member students	
Maraş massacre	December 19–26, 1978	Kahramanmaraş Province	109	Grey Wolves	Alevi Kurds	
Piyangotepe massacre	May 16, 1979	Keçiören in Ankara	7	Grey Wolves	Civilians	
Adana high school massacre	September 19, 1979	Adana Construction Vocational High School	6	Communist Party of Turkey/Marxist–Leninist	Grey Wolves affiliated teachers	Müslüm Teke, Yılmaz Kızılay, Davut Korkmaz, Ahmet Güleç, Özcan Doruk and Mustafa Karaca were killed by 2 Leftist men. Reaction to the aforementioned Maraş massacre where the Grey Wolves killed more than a hundred civilians.
Çorum massacre	May–July, 1980	Çorum Province	57	Grey Wolves	Alevi Turks	
Ortabağ massacre	January 23, 1987	Uludere in Şırnak Province	8	PKK	Civilians	
Pınarcık massacre	June 20, 1987	Pınarcık in Mardin Province	30	JİTEM/PKK (disputed)	Civilians	
Çevrimli massacre	June 11, 1990	Güçlükonak in Şırnak Province	27	PKK	Civilians	In the massacre, 27 people were killed, 12 were children and 7 were women. 4 village guards died in clashes with PKK members, 1 PKK member was killed.
Çetinkaya Store massacre	December 25, 1991	Bakırköy in Istanbul	11	PKK	Civilians	The PKK attacks a store in the Bakırköy district with Molotov cocktails, resulting in 11 deaths, including 7 women and 1 child.
Cevizdalı massacre	October 21, 1992	Cevizdalı in Bitlis Province	30	PKK	Civilians	Cevizdali village of Bitlis was raided during the nighttime, PKK militias killed 30 people, including 8 children, and wounded 20 others. Militias then burned whole the village by the news they received that soldiers are on the way to the village.
Sivas massacre (aka Madımak massacre)	July 2, 1993	Sivas	35 (+2 perpetrators)	Salafists, Grey Wolves	Alevi and leftist intellectuals	
Başbağlar massacre	July 5, 1993	Başbağlar, near Erzincan	33	JİTEM/PKK (disputed)	Civilians	
Digor massacre	August 14, 1993	Digor, Kars	17	Turkish security forces	Kurdish Civilians	Opened fire on Kurdish villagers by the Special Operation Department. 17 villagers including 7 children were killed and 63 were injured.
Vartinis massacre	October 3, 1993	Vartinis, Muş province	9	Turkish Armed Forces	Civilians	
Lice massacre	October 20–23, 1993	Lice in Diyarbakır Province	30+	Turkish Armed Forces	Kurdish Civilians	Turkish security forces attacked the town of Lice, destroying 401 houses, 242 shops and massacring more than thirty civilians, and leaving 100 wounded.
Yavi Massacre	October 25, 1993	Yavi, Çat, Erzurum Province	38	PKK	Civilians	
Ormancık massacre	January 21, 1994	Ormancık, Savur, Mardin Province	19	PKK	Village guards and affiliated civilians	The massacre may have been a chemical attack.
Kuşkonar and Koçağılı massacre	March 23, 1994	Kuşkonar and Koçağılı villages, Şırnak	38	Turkish Air Force	Kurdish Civilians	The government bombed and killed residents of villages who refused to join the government forces. The government spread pictures of dead children in newspapers and blamed the PKK. Turkey was condemned for carrying out the massacre of Kurdish civilians in the ECHR.
Gazi Quarter massacre	March 15, 1995	Istanbul and Ankara	23	JİTEM, Turkish deep state (alleged)	Alevis	More than 400 injured
Güçlükonak massacre	February 15, 1996	Güçlükonak in Şırnak province	11	JİTEM	Civilians	11 residents are shot and burned to death in a minibus by JITEM
Blue Market massacre	March 13, 1999	Istanbul	13	PKK	Civilians	
Operation Back to Life	December 19, 2000	Turkey	32	Turkish security forces	Leftist prisoners	Deaths include 30 prisoners and 2 soldiers
Diyarbakır events of March 2006	March 28–31, 2006	Diyarbakır	14	Turkish security forces	Protesters	14 Kurdish civilians including 6 children, 4 of them under the age of 10 were killed by the security forces in protests
Zirve Publishing House massacre	April 18, 2007	Malatya	3	Islamists	German Christians	
Mardin engagement ceremony massacre	May 4, 2009	Bilge, Mardin	44	Village Guards	Civilians	Reuters said it was "one of the worst attacks involving civilians in Turkey's modern history", declaring that the scale of the attack had shocked the nation.
Roboski airstrike	December 28, 2011	Uludere in Şırnak Province	34	Turkish Air Force	Kurdish Civilians	Warplanes killed who had been involved in smuggling gasoline and cigarettes in the area, villagers during an operation meant to target Kurdistan Workers' Party (PKK) rebels. The government gave no information about the facts.
Suruç bombing	July 20, 2015	Suruç in Şanlıurfa Province	34	ISIL	Socialist Party of the Oppressed member university students	
2015 Ankara bombings	October 10, 2015	Ankara	109	ISIL	Protesters, civilians	
Cizre basement massacre	February 7, 2016	Cizre, Şırnak	+178	Turkish Armed Forces	Kurdish Civilians	178 civilians, dozens of them children, some of them as young as 9 were burnt alive in three basements. Turkish government reacted to the massacre by calling it "baseless terror propaganda", and covering it up by flattening the ruins and filling the basements up with rubble.
February 2016 Ankara bombing	February 17, 2016	Ankara	30	TAK	Civilian employees of Turkish Armed Forces and soldiers	
March 2016 Ankara bombing	March 13, 2016	Ankara	38	TAK	Civilians	
2016 Atatürk Airport attack	June 28, 2016	Atatürk Airport, Istanbul	45	ISIL	Civilians	
2016 Turkish coup d'état attempt	July 15–16, 2016	Turkey (Mainly Istanbul, Ankara, Malatya, Kars and Marmaris)	270–350	Peace at Home Council	Civilians and soldiers	Turkey witnessed the bloodiest coup attempt in its political history on July 15, 2016, when a section of the Turkish military launched a coordinated operation in several major cities to topple the government
2017 Istanbul nightclub attack	January 1, 2017	Istanbul	39	ISIS	Civilians	A gunman opened fire in the Reina Nightclub during New Year celebrations
2021 Konya massacre	July 30, 2021	Meram district, Konya Province	7	Mehmet Altun	Kurds	

== Gallery ==
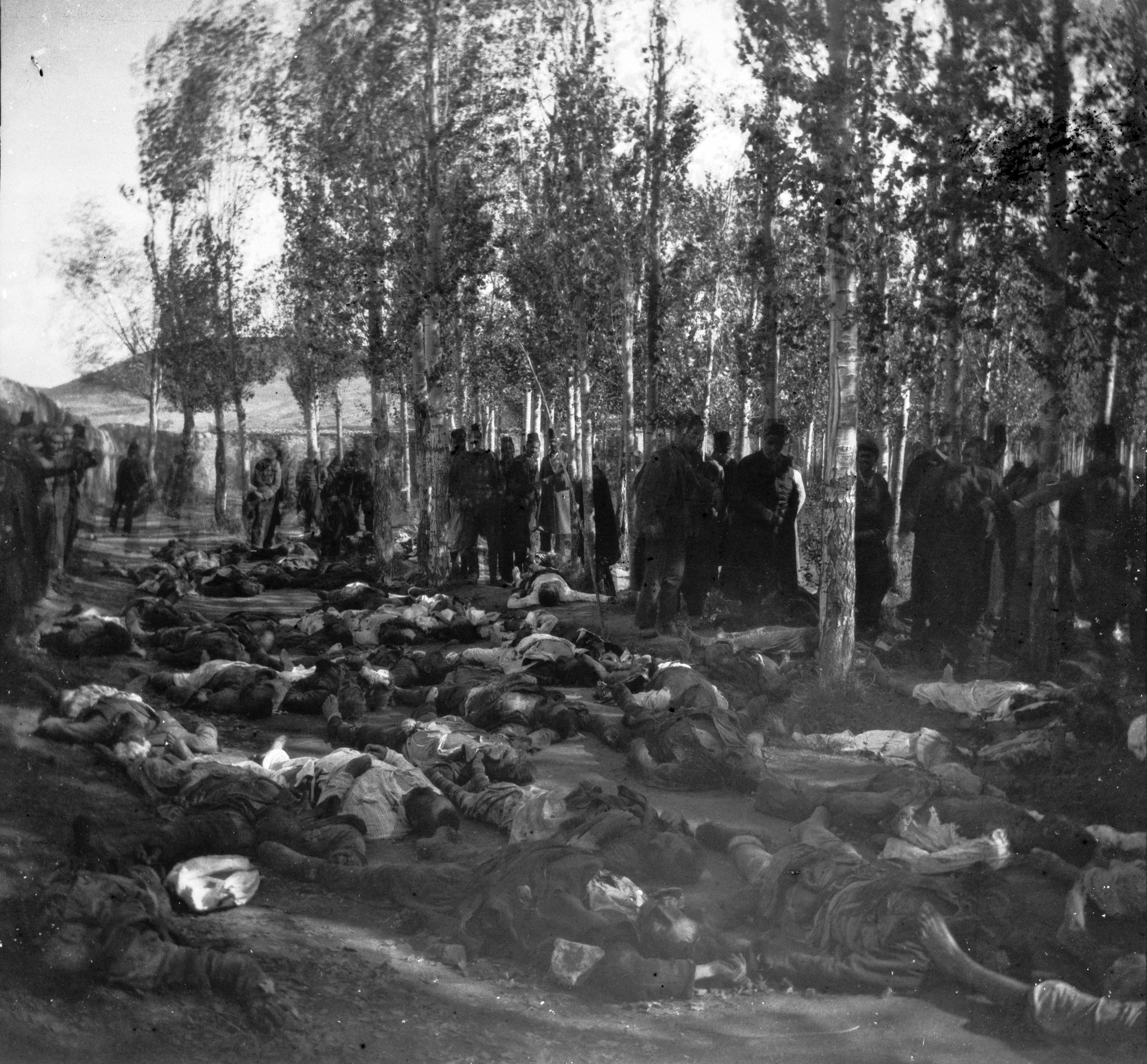
Aftermath of the massacres at Erzurum (1895)

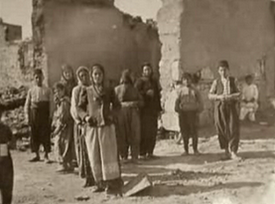
An Armenian town left pillaged and destroyed, during the Adana massacre

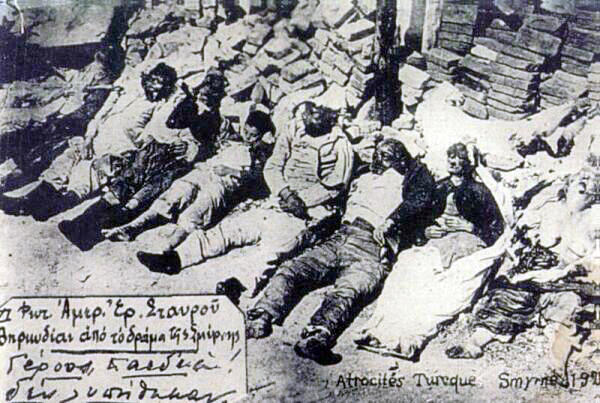
Photo taken after the Smyrna fire. The text inside indicates that the photo had been taken by representatives of the Red Cross in Smyrna

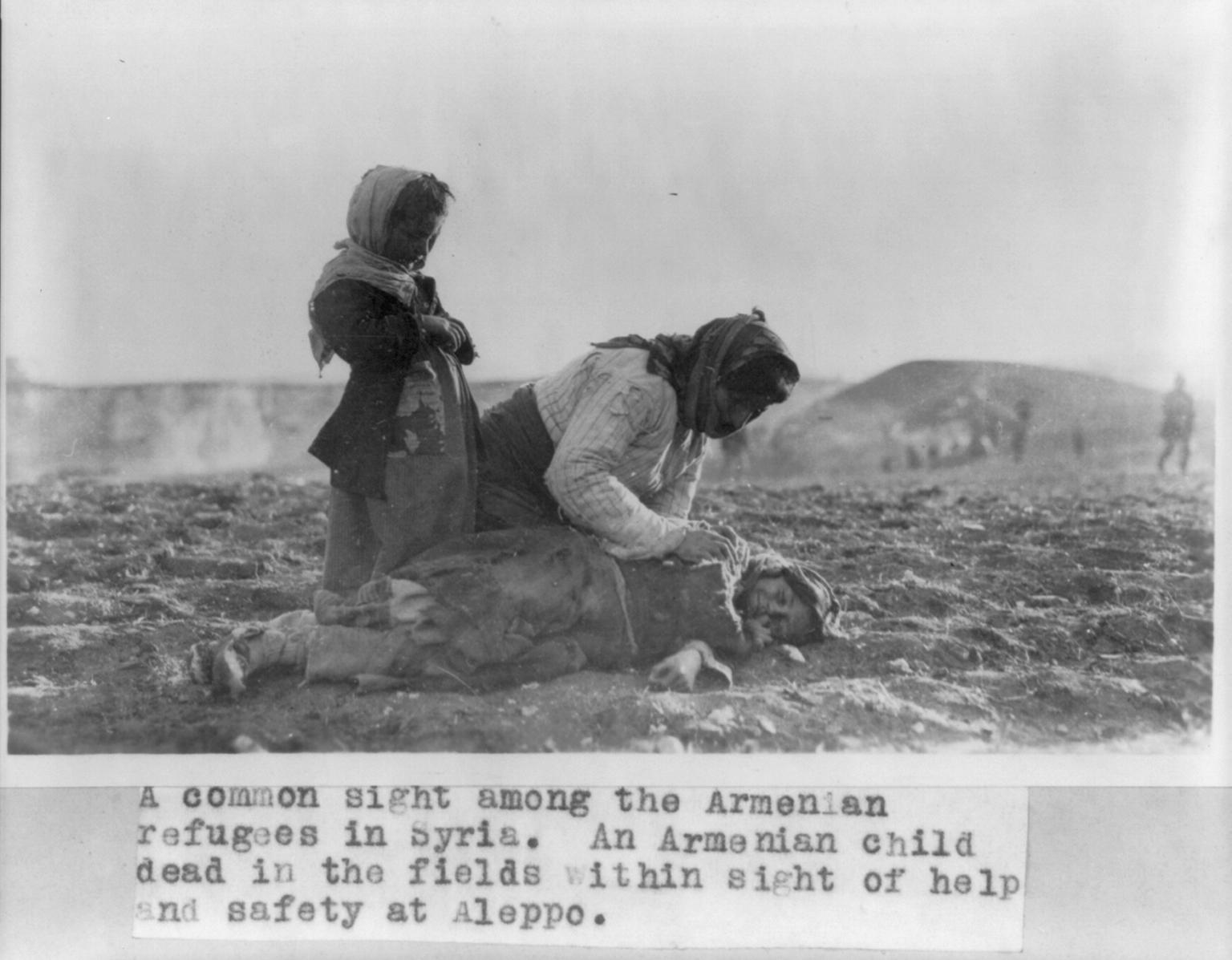
Armenian woman kneeling beside dead child in field "within sight of help and safety at Aleppo"

== See also ==
- Human rights in Turkey
