= List of massacres of Kurdish people =

This is a list of massacres of Kurdish people

Name	Date	Location	Perpetrators	Deaths
Anfal campaign	February–September 1988	Kurdistan Region, Iraq	Ba'athist Iraq	182,000
Dersim massacre	May 1, 1937 – September 1, 1938	Dersim Region (modern-day Tunceli Province, Turkey	Turkish government	13,806–70,000
Zilan massacre	12–13 July 1930	Turkey	Turkish Armed Forces	5,000–15,000
Halabja massacre	16 March 1988	Halabja, Iraq	Ba'athist Iraq	3,500–5,000
Maraş massacre	December 1978	Kahramanmaraş, Turkey	Grey Wolves (organization)	100–185
2004 Qamishli massacre	12 March 2004	Qamishli city, Syria	Ba'athist Syria	30+
Pınarcık massacre	20 June 1987	Pınarcık, Ömerli, Turkey	Kurdistan Workers' Party	32
Persecution of Feyli Kurds in Ba'athist Iraq	1970–2003	Iraq	Ba'athist Iraq	25,000
Battle of Kirkuk (2015)	30 January – 1 February 2015	Kirkuk, Iraq	ISIL	50
2021 Konya massacre	30 July 2021	Konya, Turkey	Mehmet Altun	7
Karageçit village massacre	8 November 1984	Eruh town, Siirt province	Kurdistan Workers' Party	9
Mardin engagement ceremony massacre	May 4, 2009	Bilge, Mardin, Turkey	Mehmet Çelebi and associates; 8 suspects in custody	44
Lice massacre	From 20 to 23 October 1993	Lice, Turkey	Turkish Armed Forces	+30

== See also ==
- Anti-Kurdish sentiment
- Persecution of Kurds
- List of massacres in Turkey
- List of massacres in Iraq
- Denial of Kurds by Turkey
- List of massacres in Syria
- Human rights in Turkey
