= Persecution of Kurds =

The persecution of Kurds is the ethnic and political persecution which is inflicted upon Kurds by the governments of Iran, Syria, Turkey, and Iraq.

== 20th century ==
The newly declared Turkish Republic leader Mustafa Kemal Atatürk repudiated the Treaty of Sèvres which proposed a referendum be conducted in the Kurdish homeland. As a result, conflict continued between the Turkish military and the Kurds. This conflict still exists today.

After the Dersim massacre, 40,000–70,000 civilians were killed by the Turkish Army and 11,818 people were exiled, depopulating the province. Nuri Dersimi stated that many tribesmen were killed after surrendering, and women and children were locked into hay sheds which were then lit on fire. 30,000 Kurds were massacred by the Turkish Army after the rebellion.

The Zilan massacre killed about 15,000 Kurdish civilians and the Zilan River was full to the brim with dead bodies.

The Kuşkonar massacre killed 38 people, 13 in Koçağılı and 25 in Kuşkonar. Most of the victims were children, women or elderly, including seven babies. 13 people were injured. Later the Turkish Armed Forces blamed the PKK and used the massacre as propaganda. The Turkish government refused to start investigating despite complaints of surviving villagers.

The 3-year-long Anfal campaign killed 50,000 to 100,000 non-combatant Kurdish civilians. Kurdish officials claimed the figure could be as high as 182,000. 1,754 schools, 270 hospitals, 2,450 mosques, and 90% of the Kurdish villages were destroyed.

== 21st century ==
The 2021 Konya massacre was the killing of a Kurdish family in Turkey. 4 women and 3 men were killed as a result. According to an interview given by members of the family to Duvar, the attackers where close to the far-right Nationalist Movement Party (MHP) who did not want to permit Kurds to live in the neighborhood.

The Roboski massacre was the killings of 40 Kurdish villagers on the night of December 28, 2011. They were coming from Iraq towards the Turkish border. They were mostly teenagers from the Encü family of Ortasu (in Kurdish: Roboskî) in the Uludere district of Şırnak Province, Turkey. They were smuggling cigarettes, diesel fuel and other goods into Turkey, riding on mules.

Later in 2020, pro-Iranian government protesters torched Kurdish party offices in Baghdad.

During the clashes in Syria in 2025, the Syrian transitional government, Turkey, and Arab Tribal and Clan Forces fought against Kurdish forces, leading to allegations of war crimes and massacres.

== List ==
Name	Date	Location	Deaths
Diyarbakir massacre	1925	Diyarbakır, Turkey	15,200
Zilan massacre	1930	Van, Turkey	15,000
Zini Rift Massacre	1938	Kılıçkaya, Turkey	95
Muğlalı incident, Turkey	1943	Özalp, Turkey	32
Maraş massacre, Turkey	1978	Marash, Turkey	3,000
Kurdish villages depopulated by Turkey	1984–2009	Turkish Kurdistan	30,000
August 1986 Turkish incursion into northern Iraq	1986	Iraqi Kurdistan	165
Anfal campaign	1989	Iraqi Kurdistan	50,000–182,000
Murder of Zübeyir Akkoç	1993	Diyarbakır, Turkey	1
Lice massacre	1993	Lice, Turkey	30
Vartinis massacre	1993	Muş, Turkey	9
Güçlükonak massacre	1996	Güçlükonak, Turkey	11
Kuşkonar and Koçağılı massacre	1994	Şırnak, Turkey	38
26 July 1994 bombing of North Iraq	1994	Iraqi Kurdistan	79
December 2007 Turkish incursion into northern Iraq	2007	Iraqi Kurdistan	201
2008 Turkish incursion into northern Iraq	2008	Iraqi Kurdistan	237
2011 Hakkâri attack	2011	Hakkâri, Turkey	72
August 2011 Turkey–Iraq cross-border raids	2011		167
Roboski massacre	2011	Uludere, Turkey	34
September 2012 Beytüşşebap attack	2012	Beytüşşebap, Turkey	46
Triple murder of Kurdish activists in Paris	2013	Paris, France	3
Death of Berkin Elvan	2014	Okmeydanı, Turkey	1
2015 police raids in Turkey	2015	Turkey	1
Siege of Silvan (2015)	2015	Silvan, Turkey	12
2015 Hakkari assault	2015	Hakkâri, Turkey	119
Siege of Sur (2016)	2015–2016	Sur, Turkey	200
December 2015 – February 2016 Cizre curfew	2015–2016	Cizre, Turkey	178
April 2017 Turkish airstrikes in Syria and Iraq	2017		70
Turkish airstrikes on Sinjar (2018)	2018	Sinjar, Iraq	5
Murder of Deniz Poyraz	2021	Konak, Turkey	1
2021 Konya massacre	2021	Meram, Turkey	7
Turkish airstrikes on Sinjar (2021)	2021	Sinjar, Iraq	11
Zakho resort attack	2022	Zakho, Iraq	9
2022 Paris shooting	2022	Paris, France	3
