= Bahçelievler massacre =

Murders of Turkish leftists by Ultranationalists (8 October 1978)

- Part of Political violence in Turkey, 1970s
- Location: 39.9286°N 32.8272°E; Bahçelievler, Ankara, Turkey
- Date: 8 October 1978
- Target: Workers' Party of Turkey students
- Deaths: 7
- Perpetrator: Grey Wolves

The Bahçelievler massacre refers to the events of October 9, 1978 in Bahçelievler, Ankara, Turkey, when seven university students, members of the Workers' Party of Turkey, were assassinated by ultra-nationalists including Grey Wolves' leader Abdullah Çatlı, and Haluk Kırcı. The assailants, who were armed with a number of weapons, were reportedly surprised to find the "revolutionary" students unarmed in their apartment. Five of the students were killed in the apartment, and two were taken away by car and killed nearby.

== Background ==
Other massacres during the wave of political violence in the 1970s include the March 16, 1978 Massacre when, at the exit of a school, police and civilian far-right militants bombed and shot leftist students in Beyazıt Square, killing seven; the December 23–24, 1978 Kahramanmaraş Massacre, when 111 Alevi people were killed, according to the official figures (the actual number has been estimated to be much higher). According to Kendal Nezan:

"[Abdullah Çatlı] is reckoned to have been one of the main perpetrators of underground operations carried out by the Turkish branch of the Gladio organisation and had played a key role in the bloody events of the period 1976-1980 which paved the way for the military coup d’état of September 1980. As the young head of the far-right Grey Wolves militia, he had been accused, among other things, of the murder of seven left-wing students."

He was seen in the company of Avanguardia Nazionale founder Stefano Delle Chiaie while touring Latin America and on a visit to Miami in September 1982.

== Responsibility ==
- Haluk Kırcı and Mahmut Korkmaz accepted responsibility for the massacre under the Repentance Law
- Bünyamin Adanalı and Ünal Osmanağaoğlu were also convicted
- According to Soner Yalçın and Doğan Yurdakul's 1997 book, Ercüment Gedikli and Kürşat Poyraz took active roles, while Ömer Özcan and Duran Demirkıran were lookouts.
- İbrahim Çiftçi: A bomb in a cafe in Alsancak suffered was killed in the assassination.

== See also ==
- List of massacres in Turkey
- History of the Republic of Turkey
