= Haluk Kırcı =

Turkish militant (born 1958)

- Born: 1958 (age 67–68); Erzurum, Turkey
- Other name: "Idi Amin"

Haluk Kırcı (born 1958) is a Turkish militant, who was involved in the Susurluk scandal.

His father and mother were Şükrü and Hafize, respectively.

Known among the ultra-nationalist activists (Grey Wolves) under the nickname "Idi Amin", he was wanted for the assassination of Public Deputy Prosecutor Doğan Öz in Ankara on 24 March 1978 and killing seven student members of the Worker's Party of Turkey (TİP) in Bahçelievler, Ankara by strangling, on October 9, 1978, in what is known as the Bahçelievler massacre. He was captured with a fake identity document in Istanbul on September 8, 1978, and brought to Ankara.

In 1986, he applied to the Public Prosecution Office in order to benefit from the provisions of the Act 3419. He accepted responsibility for the Bahçelievler massacre in his testimony, but did not add any new information. He was sentenced to execution seven times, but as a right-wing militant his sentence was not carried out and converted to ten years of prison time for each murder he committed. In contrast, left-wing militant Erdal Eren was executed a few years ago due to an alleged murder charge despite being seventeen years old at the time.

On July 16, 1989, Kırcı attempted to escape from Bursa Prison with a fake ID on the name of Ali Ekinci during an open visit. On April 26, 1991, he was conditionally released from Bursa Prison.

In 1991, certain intelligence was received, according to which he would go to Germany to join the administration of the Turkish Federation.

Haluk Kırcı has a remarkable influence among the ultra-nationalist activists and relations to persons at the top level of the Nationalist Movement Party (MHP).

On May 28, 2010, he was released from prison once more.
