= Anti-Kurdish sentiment =

Hostility, prejudice, or discrimination against Kurds

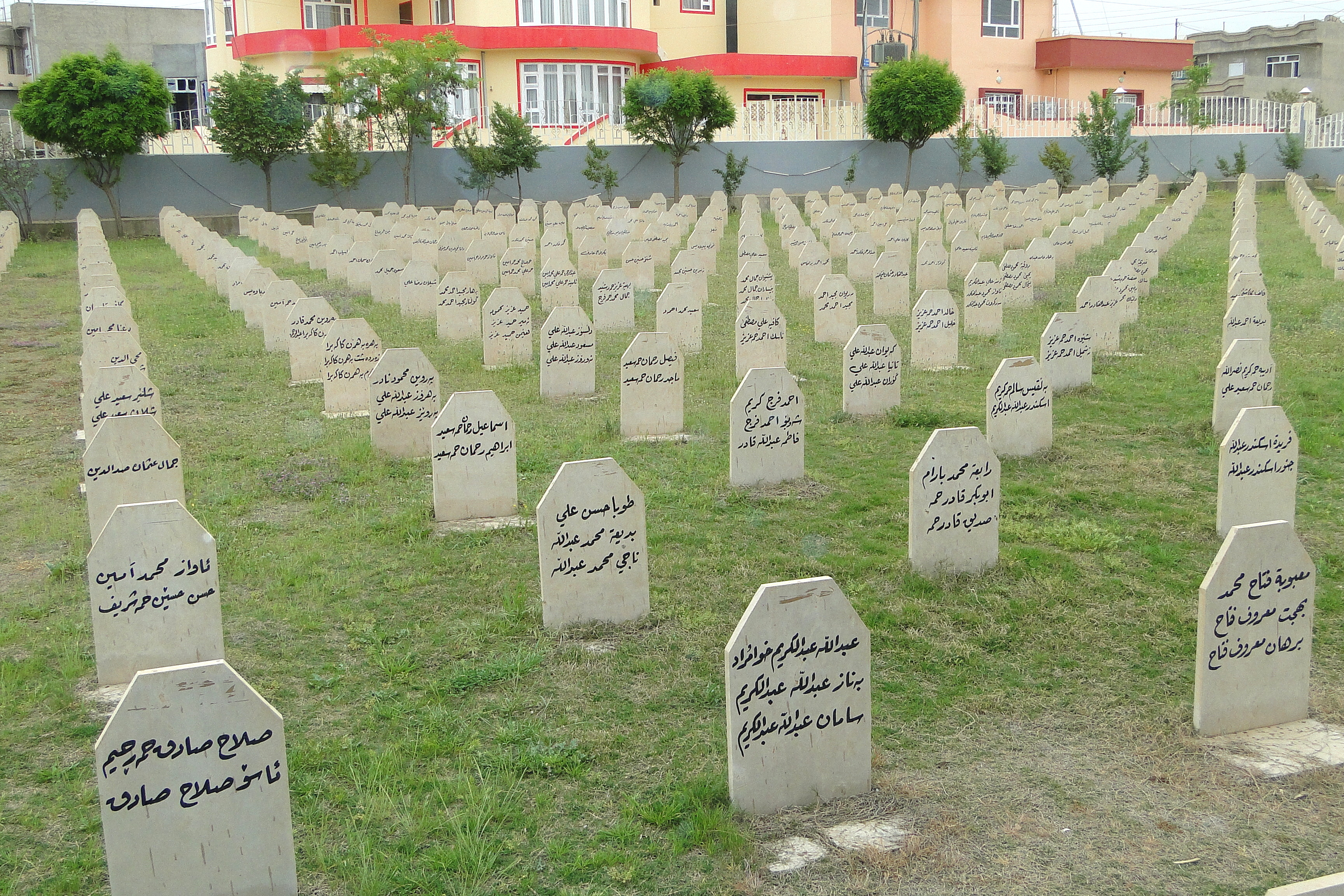
Cemetery of victims of the Halabja massacre

Anti-Kurdish sentiment, also known as anti-Kurdism or Kurdophobia, is hostility, fear, intolerance or racism against Kurds, Kurdistan, Kurdish culture, or Kurdish languages. A person who holds such positions is sometimes referred to as a Kurdophobe.

Gérard Chaliand coined the term to describe how Kurds have been oppressed. In Turkey, the government has historically denied Kurdish identity and language. In Syria and Iraq, similar anti-Kurdish policies have caused significant harm, including genocidal campaigns in Iraq under Saddam Hussein. Recently, conflicts like the fight against ISIS have increased awareness but also heightened anti-Kurdish actions and discrimination. Kurds there have been receiving death threats and demands for their expulsion.

== Origin and history ==
The term 'anti-Kurdism' appears to have been coined by Gérard Chaliand, who used it to describe anti-Kurdish sentiment in Iraq and Turkey during the mid- to late twentieth century. Much anti-Kurdish sentiment is a result of ultra-nationalist ideologies promoted by the states which preserve a significant Kurdish population.

In Turkey, Kurdish identity was officially denied by the state, which sought to Turkify the Kurds in Turkey. Kurdish language and identity are not recognised in the constitution. Turkish diplomats were taught by the National Secret Service that neither Kurds nor the Kurdish language exist. Various Turkish nationalist political parties and groups in Turkey have successfully campaigned using the general anti-Kurdish sentiment of the Turkish people. The Turkish state uses "fighting terrorism" to justify military encroachment on Kurdish areas.

Anti-Kurdish sentiment increased in the Arab world during the formation of the United Arab Republic. At that time, Gamal Abdel Nasser implemented a policy of Arabizing the new republic by cracking down on political dissent among Kurds in Syria. Following the collapse of the United Arab Republic, Syria would be officially declared the Syrian Arab Republic based on these same Arab nationalist policies.

Anti-Kurdish sentiment has also been present in Iraq where there is a large Kurdish population. Anti-Kurdism manifested itself in Saddam Hussein's Anfal campaign and the subsequent genocide in Iraqi Kurdistan.

== Current situation ==
Kurds in Iraq and Syria were embroiled in a war against the Islamic State of Iraq and the Levant. As a result of the increasing awareness of the Kurdish people due to this conflict, anti-Kurdism has also been on the rise. In the United Kingdom, a Kurdish shop owner was attacked by an Iranian man who advocated genocide against Kurds.

=== In Turkey ===
In November 2014, a Kurdish footballer Deniz Naki was the victim of an attack in Turkey. Naki, who played for the Turkish club, Gençlerbirliği S.K., was attacked by Turks while he was out buying food in Turkey's capital, Ankara. The incident occurred shortly after Naki had declared that he was Kurdish and expressed support on social media for the Kurdish groups fighting against ISIS militants. A number of assailants allegedly cursed him and called him a "dirty Kurd" before beating him and injuring his hand and giving him a black eye. Naki later left Turkey and returned to Germany to continue his football career.

In Turkey, rising national fervor driven by the military offensive against Kurdish militias in northern Syria has led to increased discrimination against Kurds, many of whom are Turkish citizens. Recent incidents, like the attack on 74-year-old Ekrem Yasli for speaking Kurdish in a hospital, highlight the growing problem. Yasli's attacker was charged but later acquitted due to a lack of evidence pointing to an anti-Kurdish motive. Human rights lawyers and activists argue that the state's failure to address ethnically motivated violence and the prevalence of hate speech in Turkish society contribute to these attacks.

Survey research has also measured Turkish attitudes toward Kurds. A 2013 survey of about 7,100 people in Turkey, conducted during the PKK ceasefire, found that Turks expressed lower tolerance toward Kurds than Kurds did toward Turks. Averaged across four social-distance questions, 65.9% of Turkish respondents said they would accept a Kurdish neighbour, tenant, business partner or son/daughter-in-law, compared with 86.8% of Kurdish respondents for Turks. Among Turks, 43.8% said they would not accept a Kurdish son- or daughter-in-law and 19% said they would not accept a Kurdish neighbour. Supporters of the ultranationalist MHP and respondents who feared that granting Kurds regional autonomy would lead to the country's disintegration were less tolerant, while having a Kurdish parent or partner was associated with greater tolerance. The authors noted that results would likely have been less tolerant during armed conflict.

=== In Japan ===
In Japan, beginning in Spring 2023, there was a significant increase in anti-Kurdish sentiment. The Asahi Shimbun reported in June 2024 that many viral anti-Kurdish posts in Japanese originated outside Japan and that some posters misrepresented their identities. One, a Turkish man in Istanbul, said he had never been to Japan and had posed as a Kurdish resident on X, writing at least 180 Japanese-language posts with machine translation to provoke hostility toward Kurds. He said he wanted to warn the Japanese about alleged PKK supporters among them. Another poster, a 27-year-old Turkish worker living in South Korea, told the newspaper he had called on "lying Kurds" to leave Japan because they were tarnishing Turkey's image. Using social media analysis software, the newspaper counted about 40,000 posts and reposts about Kurds in Japan on X in March 2023, rising to 240,000 in April during debate over an immigration law revision, 1.08 million in July after a stabbing in a brawl among Kurds in Kawaguchi, and 2.42 million in March 2024. Numerous Japanese commenters reportedly demanded that Kurds should be expelled from Japan or killed. Japanese local government employees reported being inundated with phone calls to expel the Kurds or foreigners in general. One employee reported that their entire day was taken up with dealing with such calls. One man was charged with sending death threats to a Kurdish organization; he reportedly vowed to "kill all the Kurds and feed them to the pigs". Taro Kono, a leading politician with ruling right-wing nationalist Liberal Democratic Party, blamed the Kurdish refugees and pointed to the problem of "disguised refugees" in Japan.

== See also ==
- Ba'athism
- Anfal campaign
- Halabja massacre
- List of massacres of Kurdish people
