= Çelebi (tribe) =

Kurdish tribe in Turkey

Çelebi is a Kurdish prominent family inhabiting the Mardin Province of southeastern Turkey.

== Background ==
They were involved in a long running land dispute with the 1,600-year-old Syriac Orthodox Mor Gabriel Monastery. They were involved in the 2009 Mardin engagement ceremony massacre.

They are known for their closeness to the Turkish state. They are currently allied to the Turkish government in its fight against the insurgency of the Kurdistan Workers' Party (PKK).

Tribe member Süleyman Çelebi was a member of the Motherland Party.

== Sources ==
- Markus Dressler (10 April 2015). Writing Religion: The Making of Turkish Alevi Islam. Oxford University Press. pp. 121–. ISBN 978-0-19-023409-6.
- Markus K. Tozman; Andrea Tyndall (2012). The Slow Disappearance of the Syriacs from Turkey and of the Grounds of the Mor Gabriel Monastery. LIT Verlag Münster. pp. 223–. ISBN 978-3-643-90268-9.
- Uğur Ümit Üngör (1 March 2012). The Making of Modern Turkey: Nation and State in Eastern Anatolia, 1913-1950. OUP Oxford. pp. 20–. ISBN 978-0-19-965522-9.
  - The Making of Modern Turkey
