= Kılıçkaya, Erzincan =

Village in Erzincan Province, Turkey

Kılıçkaya
- Village
- Location within Turkey
- Coordinates: 39.584°N 39.592°E
- Country: Turkey
- Province: Erzincan
- District: Erzincan
- Population (2021): 99
- Time zone: UTC+3 (TRT)

Kılıçkaya is a village in the Erzincan District, Erzincan Province, Turkey. The village is populated by Kurds of the Keçelan tribe and had a population of 99 in 2021. The hamlets of Alişir, Fındık, Ocaklı and Sarıdana are attached to the village.

== See also ==
- Zini Rift Massacre
