= Doğan Öz =

Turkish civil servant (1934–1978)

Doğan Öz (1934 – 24 March 1978) was a Turkish prosecutor. He was assassinated in 1978 while investigating the Turkish deep state. In 1978 he wrote a report for Prime Minister Bülent Ecevit accusing clandestine groups of creating chaos in order to lay the ground for a military takeover. Haluk Kırcı, a Grey Wolves activist, was implicated in his assassination.

A Grey Wolves member named İbrahim Çiftçi was found guilty of the assassination; however his conviction was overturned "after his attorney submitted a document showing that his file was held by the Ministry of Defense".
