= Ümraniye massacre =

Massacre in Turkey

Ümraniye Massacre
- Part of Political violence in Turkey, 1970s
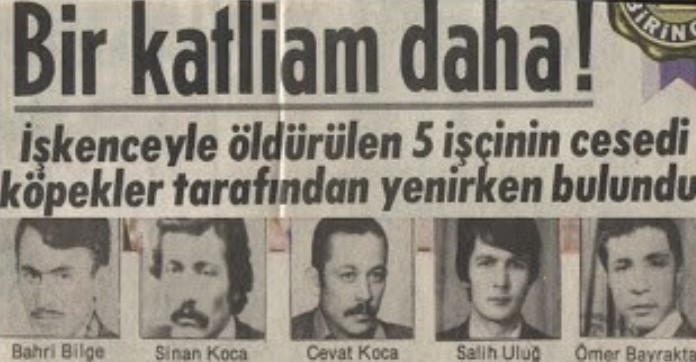
- Headline of the Hürriyet dated 18 March 1978: Another massacre! Bodies of 5 workers who were tortured to death were found eaten by dogs.
- Location: Ümraniye, Istanbul, Turkey
- Date: 17 March 1978
- Deaths: 5
- Perpetrator: Communist Party of Turkey/Marxist–Leninist

The Ümraniye massacre (Turkish: Ümraniye katliamı) or Ümraniye incident (Turkish: Ümraniye hadisesi) was a massacre of five workers in Ümraniye, Istanbul, Turkey committed by Communist Party of Turkey/Marxist–Leninist members on 17 March 1978. Two of the five victims had their eyes gouged, some of them had their ears cut off and some of them had their penises cut off. They were all shot in their heads. The political position of the victims is unknown, statements from officials claim they were apolitical while right-wing sources claim they were idealists.

== Background ==
In the 1970s, political violence became a serious problem in Turkey and started threatening the order of the country. Around 5,000 people were killed during the violence, with nearly ten assassinations per day. Most notable incidents of political violence prior to the massacre in Ümraniye was murder of a right-wing university student Ertuğrul Dursun Önkuzu on 23 November 1970, murder of a left-wing university student Hüseyin Arslantaş on 9 December 1970 and an attack on Istanbul University targeting left-wing students with a bomb and gunfire, in which 7 died and 41 were injured on 16 March 1978, one day before the massacre in Ümraniye.

== Incident ==
On 17 March, around 20:00, five workers were forcibly taken away by four armed men (Burhanettin Yıldız, Kekeme Ayvaz, Aşık Ferhat and Gavur Ali) from a coffeeshop into a secluded area. There they were beaten and were called "fascists". Ten other left-wing men (Mehmet Kurtoğlu, Ömer, Ali, İsmail, Kazım Bayboğa, Hıdır Fırat, Erol Bektaş, Sabri Koçyiğit, Hasan Kara) later joined the group.

Police discovered the bodies at 22:00. Several unknown men opened fire against forensic experts searching the crime scene at 00:00, but there were no casualties. It was later determined that fire was opened from 500 meters away and the perpetrators managed to escape.

== Victims ==
- Sinan Koca was born in Çanakçı town of Görele, Giresun Province as little brother of Cevat Koca. He was a 23 year old married man and he had 3 children, smallest of them being 10 days old when he was killed.
- Cevat Koca was born in Çanakçı town of Görele, Giresun Province. He was married and had 1 child. He was 29 years old at the time of his death.
- Bahri Bilgin was a 29 year old man at the time of his death. He was married and had 7 children.
- Ömer Bayraktar was born in Çanakçı town of Görele, Giresun Province. He was 27 years old when he was murdered. He was married and had 4 children.
- Salih Ulu was born in Çanakçı town of Görele, Giresun Province. He was married and had 1 child. He was 19 years old at the time of his death.

== Trials ==
80 suspects were arrested for the murder of the 5 workers. 78 of them were released and 2 men was convicted. However, they were both also released in 1991.
