= Gérard Chaliand =

Belgian-born French geopolitics expert and historian (1934–2025)

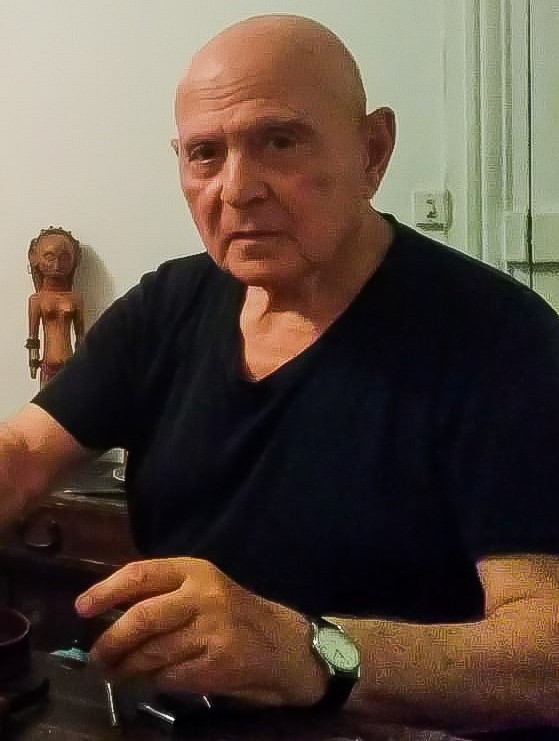
- Chaliand in 2020
- Born: 15 February 1934; Etterbeek, Belgium
- Died: 20 August 2025 (aged 91); Paris, France
- Education: Sorbonne University

Gérard Chaliand (15 February 1934 – 20 August 2025) was a Belgian-born French expert in geopolitics who published widely on irregular warfare and military strategy. Chaliand's analyses of insurgencies in Asia, Africa, Latin America, and the Middle East, mostly based on his field experience with insurgent forces, have appeared in more than 20 books and in numerous newspaper articles.

Chaliand spent more than five years as a visiting professor in the United States at Harvard, UCLA and UC Berkeley. He worked autonomously throughout his career, unconstrained by the perspectives of national governments and policy institutes. As a result, his work provides an independent perspective on many of the major conflicts that characterized the 20th and 21st centuries. He is also a published poet.

== Early life and education ==
Chaliand was born Gérard Tchalian in Etterbeek, Brussels region, Belgium, on 15 February 1934, to Armenian parents and raised in Paris. He attended the Lycée Henri IV in the Latin Quarter and spent nearly a year in London and the United Kingdom. He travelled North Africa before entering the School of Oriental Languages and Civilisations (INALCO) in Paris, where his studies focused on the history and culture of non-western societies. During his youth he hitchhiked across North Africa, Turkey, Iran, Pakistan and India. He published his first book of poetry (La Marche Têtue, Gallimard) in 1959. In 1960 he joined the clandestine struggle for Algerian Independence. After the Algerian independence, he worked during 1963–64 as an editor at the Revolution Africaine, a weekly in Algiers where he met many of the leaders of the national liberation movements of Asia, Africa, Latin America, and the Middle East.

He received his PhD from Sorbonne University in Paris in 1975. His dissertation Mythes révolutionnaires du tiers monde, was published in 1976 and quickly translated into English: Revolution in the Third World, Myths and Prospects, Viking Press, Penguin Books, New York, 1977.

Chaliand was a participant-observer in various guerrilla conflicts:

- Guinea Bissau, 1966
- North Vietnam, 1967
- Colombia, 1968/91
- Palestine/Israel, 1969/70/75/ 98/99
- Eritrea, 1977/91
- Afghanistan, 1980/82/2006-2012
- Iranian Kurdistan, 1980
- Salvador, 1982
- Angola, 1985
- Peru, 1985
- Philippines, 1987
- Nagorno-Karabakh, 1993
- Georgia (Ossetia), 1994/2006/08
- Burma, 1990/95
- Kashmir, 1999
- Sri Lanka, 1987/99/2007
- Iraqi Kurdistan, 1999-2008/2012-2015
- Iraq, 2003–2008
- Syria, 2014

He conducted field studies for over four decades in:

- Asia/Pacific
- Caucasus and Central Asia
- Central and South America
- Middle East
- Northern Africa
- Russia
- South and South East Asia
- West, East and Southern Africa

== Teaching ==
Chaliand taught in Paris, France, at the École nationale d'administration (1980–1987) and at Ecole de Guerre (the French War College) from 1990 to 1995.

He spent more than five years as a visiting professor in the United States at Harvard, UCLA and UC Berkeley.

Chaliand delivered over five hundred lectures in major Universities and research centers, including the Rand Corporation and the US Naval Postgraduate School, Monterey, California (1969–2009).

He was also a visiting professor at the military academy, Bogota (Colombia), and Universities of Cape Town (South Africa), Montréal (Québec), Salamanca (Spain), Sussex and Manchester (United Kingdom), Vladikavkaz (Northern Ossetia), Sulaymaniyah (Iraq), and Ilia Chavchavadze (Georgia). He was senior visiting fellow at the Centre for Conflict and Peace Studies, Kabul (Afghanistan) from 2005 to 2011. He taught a summer course at Nanyang University (Singapore) from 2004 to 2014 and Hawler University (Erbil, Iraqi Kurdistan, since 2012).

He also lectured at Strategic Institutes in Washington D.C., London, Canberra, Beijing, Madrid, and Tokyo.

== Other work ==
Chaliand was Director of the European Centre for the Studies of Conflicts (Foundation for Strategic Research), Paris from 1997 to 2000.

He was an independent adviser to the Centre for Analysis and Planning of the French Foreign Ministry from 1983 to 1994.

Chaliand founded and was the Director of Minority Rights Group (France), from 1978 to 1987.

He was the initiator of the session of the Permanent People's Tribunal dedicated to the genocide of the Armenian people whose jury comprised three Nobel Prize winners, including Sean Mc Bride, Founder of Amnesty International, and which took place at the Sorbonne and saw the sentence towards the Turkish state delivered to the National Assembly.

In addition, Chaliand undertook several maritime expeditions aboard La Boudeuse (goélette), a 1913-built three mast ship.

== Death ==
Chaliand died in Paris on 20 August 2025, at the age of 91.

== Selected bibliography ==
Chaliand was the author, the co-author or the editor of more than 50 books, over 20 of which have been translated into English.

=== Books in English ===
- A World History of War, UC Press Berkeley, 2014.
- History of Terrorism: From Antiquity to al Qaïda (with Arnaud Blin), Berkeley, 2007.
- Mirrors of a Disaster. The Spanish conquest of America, Transaction, Rutgers University Press. N.J. 2005
- Nomadic Empires, From Mongolia to the Danube, Transaction, Rutgers University Press, N.J. 2003.
- The Penguin Atlas of Diasporas, New York, 1995. ISBN 0-670-85439-5
- The Art of War in World History, Berkeley, 1994. ISBN 978-0-520-07964-9
- The Kurdish Tragedy, Zed Press, London, 1994, Report to the sub-commission on Human Rights (UN) on the situation of the Kurds in the Middle East.
- Strategic Atlas: A Comparative Geopolitics of the World's Powers, with J.P. Rageau, Harper & Row, New York 1987, 1990, updated edition 1992.
- Minorities at the Age of Nation-States (ed) Pluto Press, London, 1988.
- Terrorism, Saqi Books, London: 1987.
- The Genocide of the Armenians, Zoryan Institute, Boston, Mass, 1986
- Guerrilla Strategy. A Historical Anthology From the Long March to Afghanistan, ed. Berkeley, 1982.
- The Struggle for Africa. Great Power Strategies, Macmillan, London 1982.
- Report from Afghanistan, Penguin Books, Baltimore, 1982.
- A People without a country, The Kurds and Kurdistan, (Ed), Zed Books 1980, Olive Branch Press, 1993
- Revolution in the Third World: Myths and Prospects, Viking, New York 1977; updated edition, Penguin Books, 1989.
- The Palestinian Resistance, Penguin Books, Baltimore 1972.
- Peasants of North Vietnam, Penguin Books, Baltimore 1970.
- Armed Struggle in Africa: With the guerrillas in Portuguese Guinea, Monthly Review Press, New York 1969.

Chaliand also wrote a cookbook, Food without Frontiers, Pluto Press, London 1981 and two books of poems The Stubborn March, Blue Crane Books, Watercrown, MA. 1990, and Lone Rider, bilingual edition, translated by André Demir, Paris, 2015.

Many of his books have been translated into more than twelve languages.

=== Books in French ===
==== Political analysis ====
- L'Algérie est-elle socialiste?, Maspéro, 1964
- Où va l’Afrique du Sud?, Calmann-Lévy, 1986
- Etat de crise, vers les nouveaux équilibres mondiaux (avec J. Minces), Seuil, 1993
- Voyage dans le demi-siècle (avec Jean Lacouture), Complexe, 2001
- America is back, les nouveaux Césars du Pentagone, (avec Arnaud Blin), Bayard, 2003
- L'Amérique en guerre, Irak-Afghanistan, Editions du Rocher, 2007
- L'Impasse afghane, Éditions de l’Aube, 2011
- Vers un nouvel ordre du monde (avec Michel Jan), Le Seuil, 2013
- De l’Esprit d’aventure (avec P. Franceschi et J.C. Guilbert), J’ai lu, Arthaud, J’ai lu, 2011
- Le Regard du singe (avec Patrice Franceschi) Seuil 2014

==== Military strategy ====
- Atlas du nucléaire civil et militaire (avec Michel Jan), Payot, 1993
- Dictionnaire de stratégie militaire (avec Arnaud Blin), Perrin, 1998
- Les Guerres irrégulières, Folio Gallimard, 2008
- Le Nouvel Art de la guerre, l'Archipel, 2007, Pocket 2009

==== Geopolitical and historical atlases ====
- Atlas de la découverte du monde (avec J-P. Rageau), Fayard, 1984
- Atlas politique du XXème siècle (avec J-P. Rageau), Seuil, 1987
- Atlas des Européens (avec J-P. Rageau), Fayard, 1989
- Atlas des empires. De Baylone à la Russie Soviétique (avec JP Rageau), Payot, 1993
- Atlas historique des migrations (avec M. Jan et J-P. Rageau), Seuil, 1994
- Atlas historique du monde méditerranéen (avec J-P. Rageau) Payot, 1995
- Atlas de l’Asie orientale (avec M. Jan et J-P. Rageau), Seuil, 1997
- Atlas du millénaire, la mort des empires, 1900-2015 (avec J-P. Rageau), Hachette, 1998
- Atlas du nouvel ordre mondial, Laffont, 2003
- Géopolitique des empires, des pharaons à l'Imperium américain, (avec J-P. Rageau) Arthaud, 2010, Flammarion 2014

==== History ====
- Les Bâtisseurs d'histoire, Arléa, 1995, Edition augmentée, Agora 2005, Magellan, 2012
- 2000 ans de chrétientés, (avec S. Mousset), Odile Jacob, 2000, 2003
- L'Héritage occidental, (avec S. Mousset), Odile Jacob, 2002, 2015

==== Memoirs ====
- Mémoire de ma mémoire, Julliard, 2003
- Guérillas, du Vietnam à l’Irak, Hachette Pluriel, 2008
- La Pointe du couteau. Mémoires, Robert Laffont, 2011

==== Travel ====
- Los Angeles, Naissance d’un Mythe, Stock, 1991.
- Aux confins de l’Eldorado, Le Seuil, 2006
- Voyages dans 40 ans de guérillas, Lignes de repères, 2006. ISBN 2-915752-13-3
- Le Guide du voyageur autour du monde (avec S. Mousset) Odile Jacob, 2007

Chaliand also published three plays, four books for children and translations of Kautiliya's Arthashastra (book seven), Guevara's La guerra de guerrillas, and a book of popular Turkish poetry (bilingual).
