= Mardin engagement ceremony massacre =

Massacre in Bilge, a village in the Mardin province of Turkey

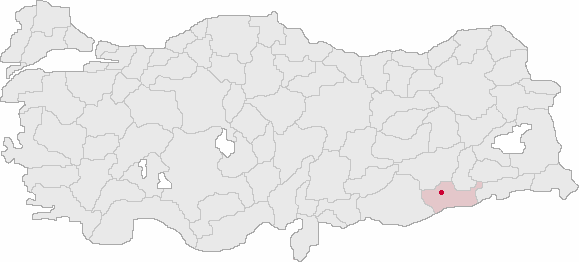
- Location of Mardin in Turkey
- Location: 37°27′51″N 40°35′15″E; Bilge, Mardin, Turkey
- Date: May 4, 2009; 17 years ago
- Attack type: Mass shooting
- Weapons: grenades, automatic weapons
- Deaths: 44
- Injuries: 3–6
- Perpetrators: Mehmet Çelebi and associates; 8 suspects in custody
- Motive: Alleged blood feud

On May 4, 2009, Mehmet Çelebi, a village guard, killed at least forty-four people at an engagement ceremony in the village of Bilge in the Mardin Province of Turkey. The attack was perpetrated using grenades and automatic weapons by at least two masked assailants, who authorities believe are involved in a feud between two families. According to some sources, it was an internal feud of the Kurdish Çelebi clan.

The faces of the victims were left in a physically unrecognisable state. Reuters said it was "one of the worst attacks involving civilians in Turkey's modern history", declaring that the scale of the attack had shocked the nation.

== Casualties ==
The guests were escorted into a large room before being attacked with hand grenades. The attack killed at least forty-four people and injured six, according to Turkey's Interior Minister, Beşir Atalay. The Bilge village head along with ten other members of his family were among those killed in the attack. Six of the dead were children, sixteen were reported as being women, and twenty-two as men. Other corpses discovered at the scene included those of the bride, Sevgi Çelebi, and her husband, Habib Ari alongside Ari's sister, Ruken, a four-year-old girl. The bride's father, Cemil Çelebi, was injured. The wedding cleric himself was also killed in the incident. Two girls allegedly survived by hiding under the corpses of associates. One whole family, composed of two adult parents and six children between the ages of three and twelve at the time of their deaths, were slaughtered. Several wailing women pursued the ambulances bearing 17 corpses to a Mardin morgue.

One man whose nephew was murdered described the scene as "horrifying", saying "you could not believe your eyes". Another involved man claimed the slaughter began "after they took their position to perform prayers" and that explosives had been used to dismember the faces of the victims. Schoolteacher Sadik Akbulut attended the engagement ceremony alongside his wife, Bedia Akbulut, but survived after he failed to wake up in time for the party. Bedia claimed they heard shots being fired and that her husband dimmed the lights.

Approximately two hundred guests attended the engagement ceremony. Allegations of a family feud surfaced when it emerged that there was a similarity between the dead and those who left them in this state. However, it has been said that this feud was settled around twenty years previously. The marriage is thought to have reopened the feud amongst factions which "strongly disagreed" with its occurrence. It has been described as "a combination of tribalism, love for guns, and tradition gone awfully wrong".

It is unclear if the bride and groom had completed the required steps to become legally married. While some reports refer to them in unmarried terms, others refer to them in married terms.

== Perpetrators ==
Speculation as to the cause and identity of the perpetrators circulated via the local media after the incident. One suggestion had a long-term village family feud. Another suggestion blamed the Village Guards, a shadowy militia force established in 1984 to assist government troops in battles against the PKK. Those who carried out the attack were disguised in masks.

The perpetrators fled after the attack to the nearby Syrian border as a sandstorm in the area intensified. Initial assessments rule out the PKK, according to Atalay. As of May 5, there were eight suspects in custody that had been arrested with weapons and they remain anonymous.

Soldiers blockaded roads leading into the village after the incident and journalists were forbidden to enter. Electricity supplies and telephone access were also cut off.

Later, a village guard, Mehmet Çelebi admitted the massacre.

=== Legal prosecution ===
A ruling ratifying the sentencing of Mehmet Çelebi and 3 other defendants to 44 times life imprisonment was issued in February 2012.

== Rehabilitation of orphaned children ==
The government and civic organizations set up a rehabilitation program in June 2009 in the form of occupational therapy for the children orphaned with the aim to lessen their pain and make them forget the memories of the massacre. A sports center was established in the village by the national gymnast Nuri Batır to provide lessons in gymnastics, athletics and swimming. Major sponsors of the project were the Ministry of Culture and Tourism and Middle East College in Diyarbakır.

35 of the 62 orphans took part at the sports lessons. After only one week of training, the children attended a sports contest in Batman and achieved seventh place among 15 teams.

Twenty-one children were prepared for performing a show on the national and international stage. They showed their abilities first during the Victory Day celebrations on August 30 in Mardin. Their show called "Bilge Village Peace Flowers" took later place at school openings in Mardin, Diyarbakır and Ankara. A show named "Peace Shows" was prepared for staging in neighboring countries including Cyprus, Northern Cyprus, Azerbaijan, Northern Iraq, Palestine and Lebanon.

A twelve-year-old girl, who had lost both her mother and father in the violence, said the sports activities helped her forget the event. She continued that performing shows for children of other countries will be most exciting for her since "I do not want to see children losing their mothers and fathers anymore," adding "I want peace and brotherhood."

== See also ==
- List of massacres in Turkey
