= Persecution of Yezidis =

Overview of hostility, discrimination, and persecution against the Yazidi people

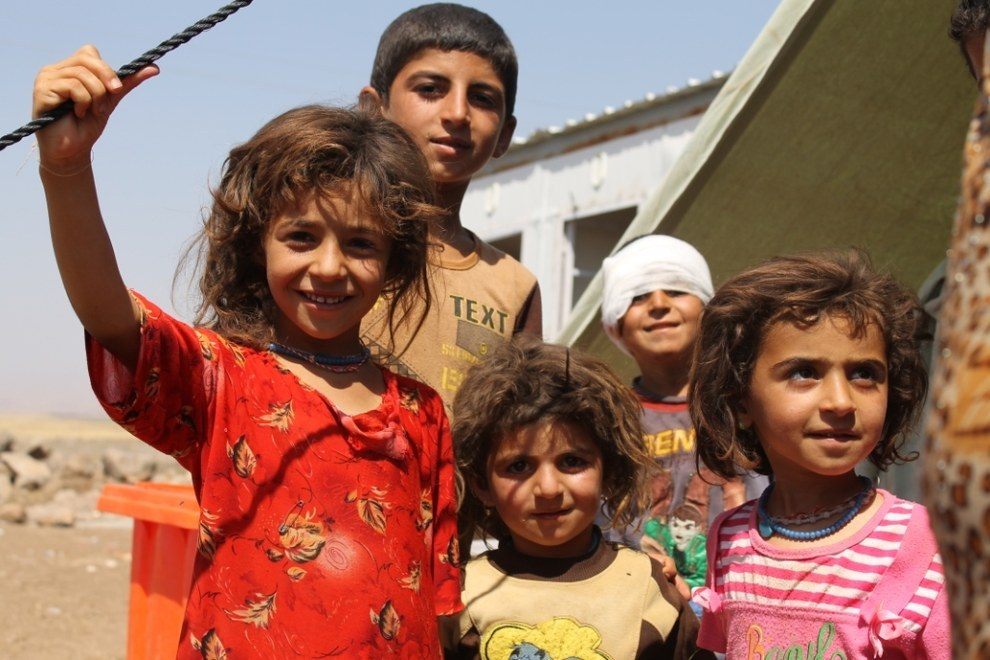
Yazidi refugee children from Sinjar in Newroz Camp, Al-Malikiyah District, August 2014, after the Sinjar massacre.

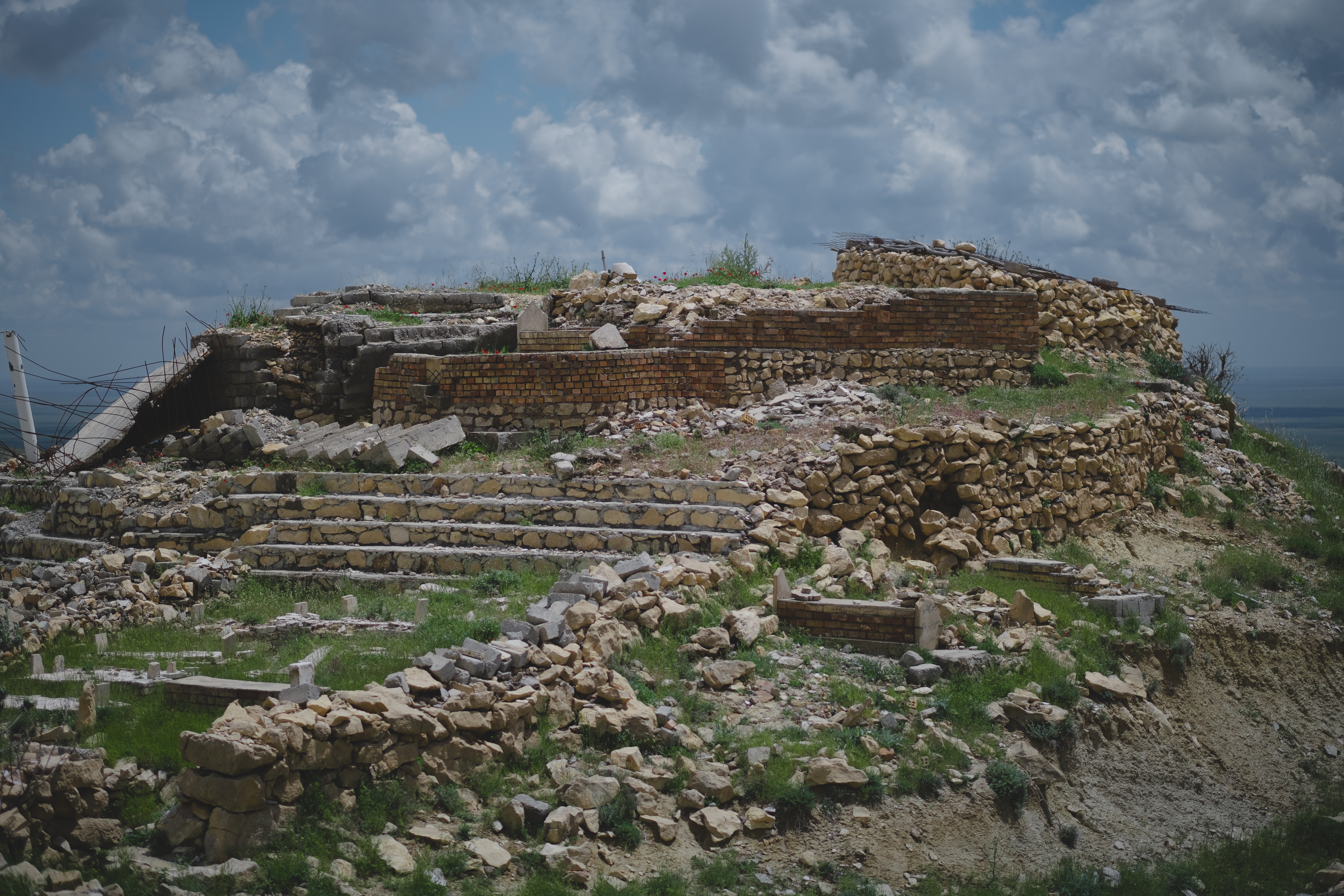
Ruins of the Yazidi shrine of Mam Rashan in Sinjar mountains after its destruction by the Islamic State.

The persecution of Yazidis has been ongoing since at least 637 CE. Yazidis are an endogamous and mostly Kurmanji-speaking minority, indigenous to Kurdistan. The Yazidi religion has historically been regarded as "devil-worship" among the followers of Abrahamic religions, primarily among Muslims and is still described as such by some, especially by Islamic extremists. Yazidis have been persecuted by surrounding Muslim state entities and groups since the medieval ages, most notably by Ottomans, neighbouring Muslim Arab and Kurdish tribes and principalities. After the 2014 Sinjar massacre of thousands of Yazidis by ISIL, which started the ethnic, cultural, and religious genocide of the Yazidis in Iraq,

== Early persecution ==
After some Kurdish tribes became Islamized in the 10th century, they joined in the persecution of Yazidis in the Hakkari mountains. Due to their religion, Muslim Kurds persecuted and attacked the Yazidis with particular brutality. Sometimes, during these massacres, Muslim Kurds tried to force the Yazidis to convert to Islam. Massacres by Muslim Kurds and Turks in the 19th century nearly eradicated the Yazidi population.

=== 13th century ===
In 1254, Sheikh Adī's grand-nephew al-Ḥasan b. 'Adī together with 200 of his supporters were executed by Badr al-Din Lu'Lu, who was a Kurd convert to Islam and Zangid governor of Mosul, Sheikh Adi's tomb at Lalish was then desecrated.

=== 15th century ===
In 1415, a Shāfi'ī theologian, 'Izz al-Dīn al Hulwānī, with the military support of the Sunni Kurds of the Sindi tribe and the lord of Ḥiṣn Kayfā, attacked Lalish and burnt down the temple. The Yazidis later rebuilt their temple and the tomb of Sheikh Adi.

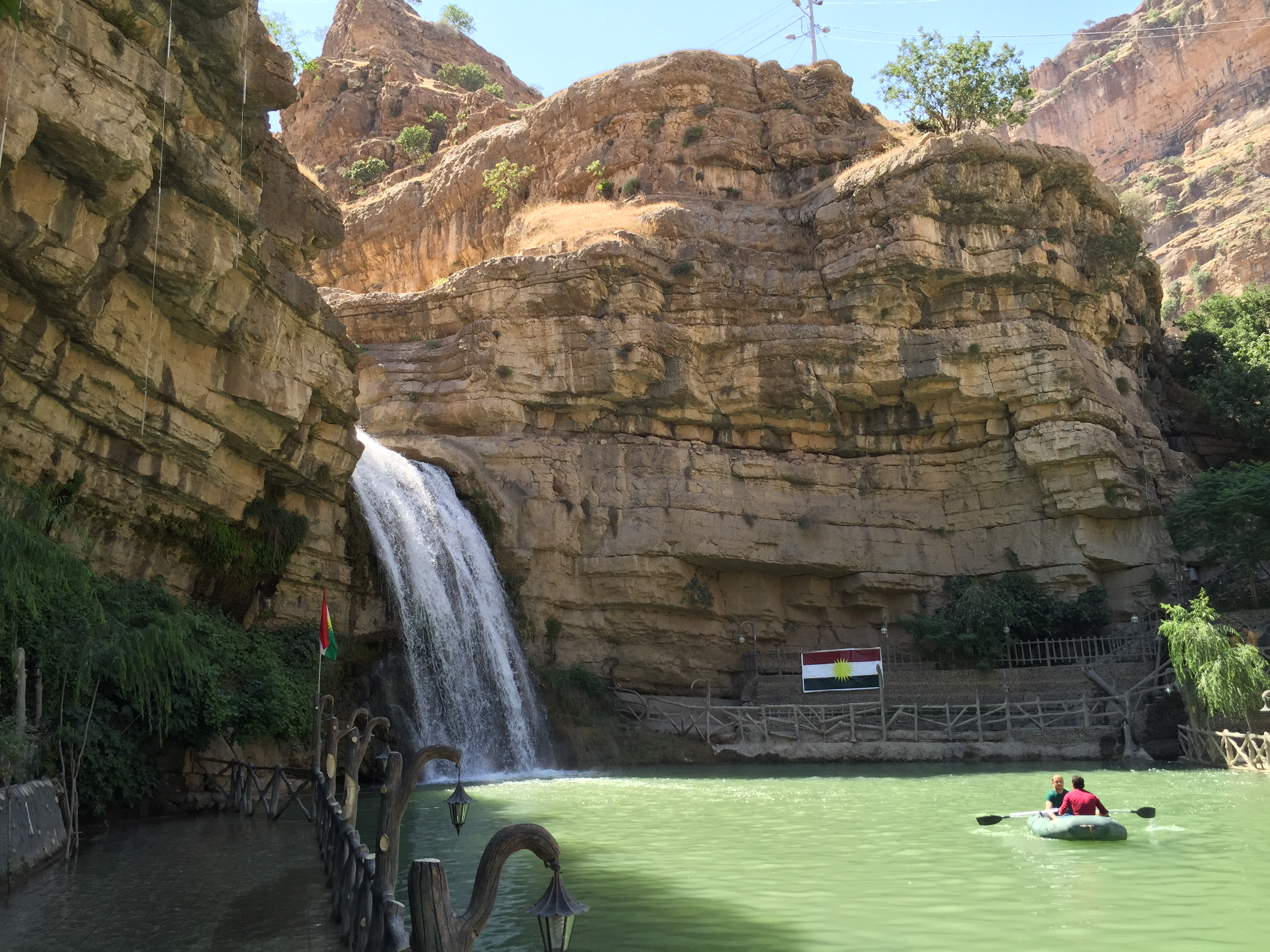
The Geli Ali Beg Waterfall in Iraqi Kurdistan is named after the Yazidi leader Ali Beg who was killed there in 1832 by the Kurdish prince Muhammad Pasha of Rawanduz.

=== 16th century ===
In the year 1585, the Yazidis in the Sinjar Mountains were attacked by the Sunni Kurds from Bohtan.

=== 19th century ===
In 1831,Mir Muhammad of Rawanduz massacred the people of the Kellek village. He then went northward and attacked the entire Yazidi-inhabited foothill country which was located east of Mosul. Some Yazidis managed to take refuge in the neighboring forests and mountain fastnesses, and a few of them managed to escape to distant places.

In the year 1832, about 70,000 Yazidis were killed by the Sunni Kurdish princes Bedir Khan Beg and Muhammad Pasha of Rawanduz. During his research trips in 1843, the Russian traveller and orientalist Ilya Berezin mentioned that 7,000 Yazidis were killed by Kurds of Rawandiz on the hills of Nineveh near Mosul, shortly before his arrival. Mir Muhammad of Rawanduz massacred as many as 10,000 Yazidi men on the mound of Koyunjik. Following this Reşid Mehmed Pasha campaigned against Sinjar, reportedly destroying three fourths of the population. The Ottomans after a second massacre, carried off more than thirty thousand into slavery, Yazidi girls were sold at the Black sea for thirty piastre."

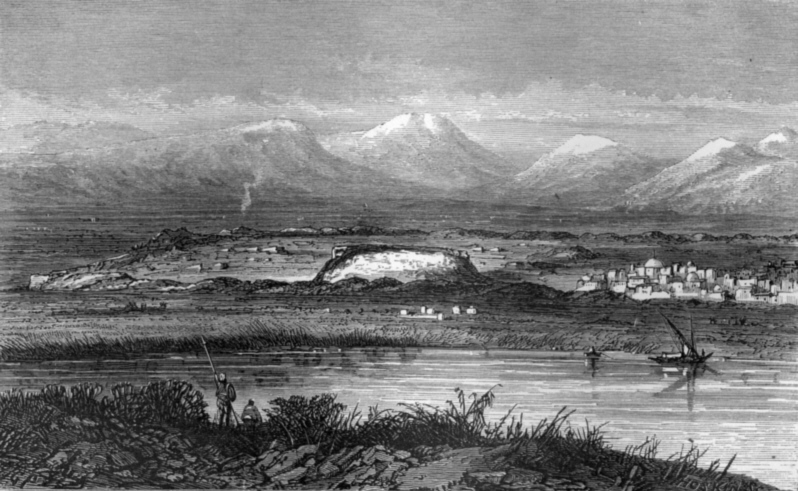
Many Yazidis from Sheikhan, who had fled from the Kurds but could not cross the Tigris river, gathered on the great mound of Kouyunjik, where they were persecuted and killed by Muhammad Pasha's men.

In 1832, Muhammad Pasha and his troops committed a massacre against the Yazidis in Khatarah. Subsequently, they attacked the Yazidis in Shekhan and killed many of them. In another attempt he and his troops occupied over 300 Yazidi villages. The emir kidnapped over 10,000 Yazidis and sent them to Rawandiz and gave them the ultimatum of converting to Islam or being killed. Most of them converted to Islam and those who refused to convert to Islam were killed.

In 1832, Bedir Khan Beg and his troops committed a massacre against the Yazidis in Shekhan. His men almost killed the whole Yazidi population of Shekhan. Some Yazidis tried to escape to Sinjar. When they attempted to escape towards Sinjar, many of them drowned in the Tigris River. Those who could not swim were killed. About 12,000 Yazidis were killed on the bank of the Tigris river by Bedir Khan Beg's men. Yazidi women and children were also kidnapped.

The inhabitants of Sinjar were soon subdued first by the Ottoman forces under the command of Muhammad Rashid Pasha, and for a second time by the Ottoman forces under the command of Hafiz Pasha. On both occasions, a massacre took place, and three-quarters of the population were destroyed. The Yazidis took refuge in caves, where they were either suffocated by fires lit at the entrances or annihilated by artillery fire.

In 1833, the Yazidis who lived in the Aqrah region were again attacked by Muhammad Pasha and his soldiers. The perpetrators killed 500 Yazidis in the Greater Zab. Afterwards, Muhammad Pasha and his troops attacked the Yazidis who lived in Sinjar and killed many of them.

In 1844, Bedir Khan Beg and his men committed a massacre against the Yazidis in the Tur Abdin region. His men also captured many Yazidis and forced them to convert to Islam. The inhabitants of seven Yazidi villages were all forced to convert to Islam.

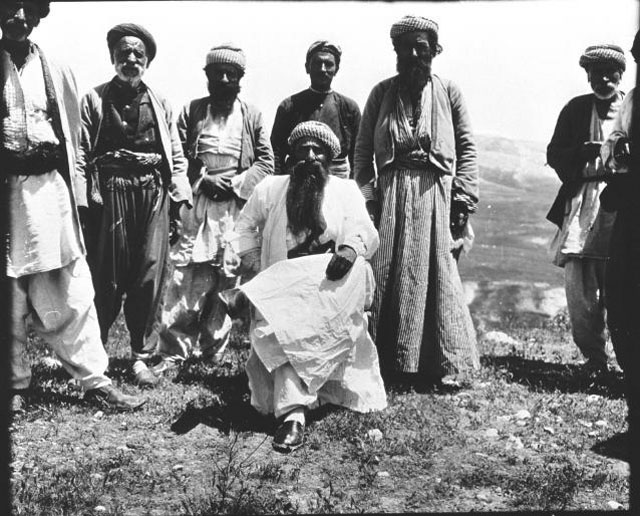
In the picture in the middle you can see Ali Beg II. (the grandson of the Yazidi leader Ali Beg and the grandfather of Tahseen Said)

Many Yazidis also defended themselves against the attacks. So did Ali Beg, the Yazidi leader in Sheikhan. The Yazidi leader Ali Beg mobilized his forces in order to oppose Muhammad Pasha, who mobilized the Kurdish tribes which lived in the surrounding mountains in order to launch an attack against the Yazidis. Ali Beg's troops were outnumbered and he was captured and killed by Muhammad Pasha.

=== Late 19th century ===
After the Ottomans had given the Yazidis a certain legal status in 1849 through repeated interventions by Stratford Canning and Sir Austen Henry Layard, they sent their Ottoman general Omar Wahbi Pasha (later known as "Ferîq Pasha" in the memory of the Yazidis) in 1890 or 1892 from Mosul to the Yazidis in Shaikhan and again gave the Yazidis an ultimatum to convert to Islam. When the Yazidis refused, the areas of Sinjar and Shaykhan were occupied and another massacre committed among the residents. The Ottoman rulers mobilized the Hamidiye cavalry, later founded in 1891, to take action against the Yazidis. Many Yazidi villages were attacked by the Hamidiye cavalry and the residents were killed. The Yazidi villages of Bashiqa and Bahzani were also raided and many Yazidi temples were destroyed. The Yazidi Mir Ali Beg was captured and held in Kastamonu. The central shrine of the Yazidis Lalish was converted into a Quran school. This condition lasted for twelve years until the Yazidis were able to recapture their main shrine Lalish.

== 20th century ==
During the Armenian genocide, many Yazidis were killed by Hamidiye cavalry known as the Seventy-second firman of the Yazidi. According to Aziz Tamoyan, as many as 300,000 Yazidis were killed with the Armenians, while others fled to Transcaucasia.

Many Yazidis found refuge in Armenia as they fled from the Kurds and Turks. Despite the fact that the Yazidis hid 20,000 Christians from the Ottomans in the Sinjar Mountains during the Armenian genocide, the Yazidis faced discrimination in Armenia. Yazidi children tended to hide their identities in schools so they would not be discriminated against. Furthermore, the term "Yezidi" is often used by non-Yazidis as an insult.

According to Arbella Bet-Shlimon, in 1935 the Iraqi Army attacked eleven Yazidi villages, placed Sinjar under martial law, and then sentenced many Yazidi prisoners to death or to long sentences because they had resisted mandatory conscription; some of the prisoners were even paraded in front of a jeering crowd in Mosul that killed one of the captives.

== 21st century ==
In the 21st century, Yazidis faced targeted violence from insurgents during the Iraq War, including an April 2007 massacre that killed 23, and the Qahtaniyah bombings, which killed 796, and the Yazidi family massacre (2008) killing seven. The Sinjar Resistance Units (YBŞ) was set up to defend Yazidis in the aftermath of these attacks.

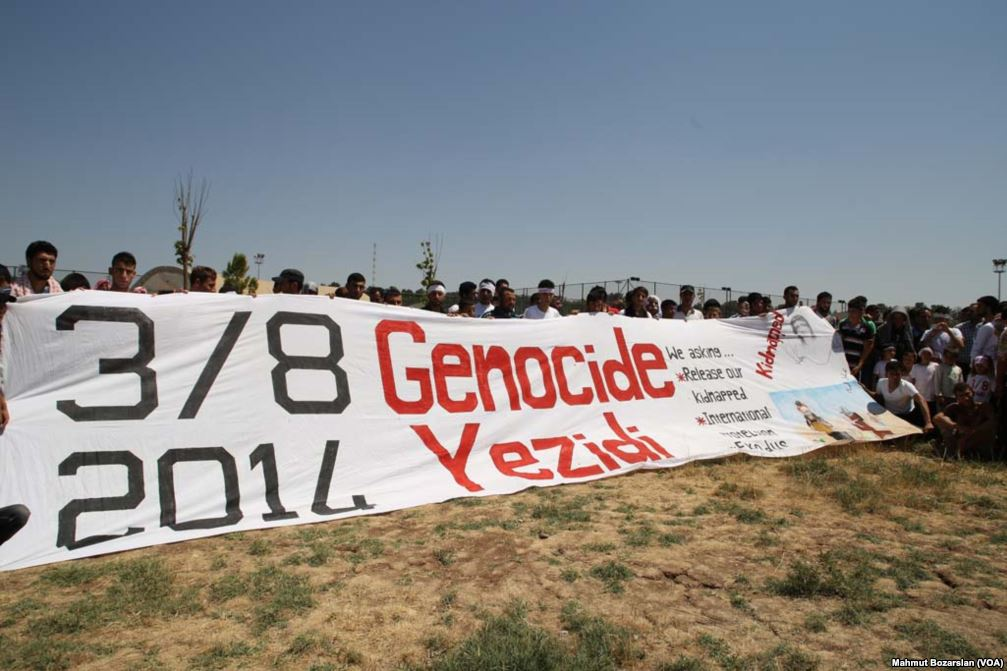
Yazidi commemoration of the genocide on August 3, 2014 in the Kurdish city of Diyarbakır in Turkey (2015)

The genocide of Yazidis by ISIL, which began with the 2014 Sinjar massacre, led to the expulsion, flight and effective exile of the Yazidis from their ancestral lands in Sinjar. Thousands of Yazidi women and girls were forced into sexual slavery by the Sunni fundamentalist majority-Arab terrorist group ISIL, and thousands of Yazidi men were killed. Five thousand Yazidi civilians were killed during what has been called a "forced conversion campaign" being carried out by ISIL in Northern Iraq. The genocide began after the withdrawal of the KRG's Peshmerga militia, which left the Yazidis defenseless. Among the reasons for the Peshmerga's retreat was the unwillingness of the Sunnis in the ranks to fight fellow Muslims in the defence of Yazidis. ISIL's persecution of the Yazidis gained international attention and led to another American-led intervention in Iraq, which started with United States airstrikes against ISIL. Kurdistan Workers' Party, People's Protection Units, and Syriac Military Council fighters then opened a humanitarian corridor to the Sinjar Mountains.

Since 2016, many Yazidis in Syria have fled from the Afrin region to the relative safety of the secular Autonomous Administration of North and East Syria, because of fears of persecution by the Turkish-backed Syrian National Army, an overwhelmingly Sunni militia.

=== Kurdistan Region ===
According to a report by Human Rights Watch, the Kurdish authorities have used heavy-handed tactics against the Yazidis and was accused of kidnapping and beating two Yazidi men belonging to the Yazidi Movement for Reform and Progress who criticized the actions of the authorities. After the Kurdish authorities kidnapped them, they gave them two options, either they would accept that they were Kurds or they would confess that they were "terrorists". In addition, the Kurdish officers asked which language they speak. When the Yazidis replied "Yazidi", they were further tortured.

There have also been some demographic changes in Yazidi-majority areas after the fall of Saddam. In the Sheikhan area, which is considered a historic Yazidi stronghold, the Kurdish authorities have allegedly settled Sunni Kurds to strengthen their claim that it should be included within the Kurdistan Region. In modern times, Kurdistan Region is accused of taking over traditional Yazidi settlements.

According to Yazidi activists reports, from 2003 to 2012, around 30 Yazidi women and girls were kidnapped and forced into marriage with Asayish members.

== Ideological basis ==
During their history, the Yazidis have mostly been under the pressure of their Muslim neighbors, which led to violence and massacres at times.

According to Yazidi belief, mentioning the names or epithets used by other faiths for the "evil spirit" is considered sinful, as doing so implies acknowledgement of evil as an independent entity, which would diminish God's omnipotence. Because Yazidis historically avoided gatherings where such figures were cursed or condemned, outside observers mistook this avoidance for veneration, generating misconceptions that in turn fueled persecution. Yazidi theological thought holds that humans themselves constructed the concept of a devil figure to externalize responsibility for their own moral failings, while God granted humanity free will and the capacity to distinguish right from wrong.

Kurdish muftis have given the persecution of Yazidis a religious character and they have also legalized it. Also Kurdish mullahs such as Mahmud Bayazidi viewed the Yazidis as unbelievers.

== Yazidi view of the persecutions ==
VOA report about female Yazidis fighting ISIL from 2016

Remembering persecution is a central part of Yazidi identity. The Yazidis speak of 74 genocides of them in their history and call these genocides "Farman". The number of 72 Farman can be derived from the oral traditions and folk songs of the Yazidis. "Farman" meant "decree" in Persian, and referenced the decrees given by the Ottoman government targeting the Yazidis, which were so numerous that the Yazidis began to interpret the word as having meant genocide. The last Farman is number 74 and denotes the genocide of the Yazidis by the IS terrorists.

== See also ==
- Index of articles related to the Yezidis
- Yazidi history
- Yazidi genocide by the Soran Emirate (1832–1834)
- Yazidi genocide
