= Kuşkonar and Koçağılı massacre =

Massacre in Turkey

The Kuşkonar and Koçağılı massacre (Turkish: Kuşkonar Katliamı, Kurdish: Komkujiya Kuşkonare) is the name given to the 26 March 1994 massacre in which 38 Kurdish villagers were killed and the villages of Koçağılı and Kuşkonar near the province of Şırnak were destroyed as a result of the Turkish Armed Forces' heavy bombardment.

The families of victims who appealed to the Turkish court weren't convinced from the court decision that the PKK was responsible for the massacre. They appealed to the European Court of Human Rights (ECHR) and the investigations revealed that in spite of Turkey's claims there were no clashes in the area. Turkey was condemned for killing Kurdish civilians and the ECHR ordered Turkey to pay 2.3 million euros to the families of victims.

== Incident ==
The incident took place at the villages of Koçağılı and Kuşkonar, Sirnak Province, in the morning of 26 March 1994 whilst most male residents of both villages were working in the fields outside the villages. Villagers heard aircraft flying nearby at around 10.30 and 11.00 AM. Turkish Air Force military aircraft and a helicopter circled both villages and started to bomb them. Villagers who saw bombs tried to escape the bombardment, but machine gun fire from the helicopter prevented their escape. Some people received direct hits and some were trapped under the rubble of the houses that were destroyed in the bombing.

After the bombardment 38 people had died, 13 people in Koçağılı and 25 in Kuşkonar. Most of those who died were children, women or elderly, including seven babies. In addition, a total of 13 people were injured. Later the Turkish Armed Forces soldiers blamed the Kurdistan Workers' Party (PKK) and used the incident as a propaganda. The government had also refused to start investigations despite the complaints of the survived villagers and their relatives.

According to the court, blaming the PKK for crimes like this was back then common act by Turkish government.

== Aftermath ==
The lawyer of the case was Tahir Elçi, a Kurdish lawyer and activist. He had been previously threatened by state-sponsored factors for not labelling the PKK as a terrorist organization.

== See also ==
- List of massacres in Turkey
- List of massacres of Kurds
