= Ormancık, Savur =

Village in Mardin Province, Turkey

Ormancık
- Neighbourhood
- Location within Turkey
- Coordinates: 37°35′59″N 41°5′26″E
- Country: Turkey
- Province: Mardin
- District: Savur
- Population (2021): 31
- Time zone: UTC+3 (TRT)

Ormancık (Kurdish: Askêla) is a neighbourhood in the municipality and district of Savur, Mardin Province of Turkey. The village is populated by Kurds of the Dereverî tribe and had a population of 31 in 2021.

== History ==
On 21 January 1994 it was reportedly attacked with grenades by the PKK. Nineteen people, composed of nine women, six children and four village guards - were killed in what Human Rights Watch described as a "massacre." There is speculation that the event was a chemical attack.
