= Centre for Conflict and Peace Studies =

Research center in Kabul, Afghanistan

The Centre for Conflict and Peace Studies
- Formation: 1 July 2006
- Founded at: Kabul, Afghanistan
- Purpose: issues pertaining to governance, security, and developmental challenges in Afghanistan
- Website: www.caps.af

The Centre for Conflict and Peace Studies (abbreviated CAPS) is an independent research centre based in Kabul, Afghanistan. The centre came into being in July 2006.

CAPS is one of the very few research centres in Afghanistan that are managed and staffed by Afghans. The centre is engaged in research and policy analysis; education and training; and capacity building and knowledge sharing.

The centre focuses its research on issues pertaining to governance, security, and developmental challenges in Afghanistan. CAPS is also active in sharing its research findings with the Afghans as well as with the international community. It provides pre-deployment training to various contingents of the international community that are deployed in Afghanistan.
