= Karageçit village massacre =

1984 massacre of Kurdish civilians by the PKK in Turkey

Coordinates: 37°33′40″N 42°06′34″E

- Part of Turkey–PKK conflict
- Location: Eruh town, Siirt province (it is located on Sirnak province at the present time)
- Date: 8 November 1984
- Deaths: 9 civilians (5 women, 4 children)
- Perpetrator: PKK
- Charges: 24-year imprisonment
- Convicted: Mustafa Çimen

The Karageçit village massacre was the killing of 9 Kurdish women and children on 8 November 1984, in the village of Karageçit (Kurdish: Spivyan or Sipîbiyan) of Siirt province, Eruh District in Turkey (today part of Şırnak District). This incident was the second one of three attacks that PKK did attack the same village.

== Incident ==
MDP Hatay province parliamentarian of the time Murat Sökmenoğlu made an oral motion about this massacre and Minister of Internal Affairs of the time Yıldırım Akbulut answered that PKK's first attack to Karagecit Village was happened on 22 September 1984, result of this attack one village guard was wounded.

It was said that second attack was begun at 7.30 P.M on 8 November 1984. According to Yıldırım Akbulut, attack was happened with rockets directed at village head's house and village guard's house.

As a result of the attack 9 civilians died, four each of Can and Sevim families. Their names were: Asiye Can, Leyla Sahin, Aynur Sevim, Lutfiye Sevim, Ayse Can, Veli Can, Bahar Sevim, Bedrettin Sevim, Zeynep Can.

== After ==
It was claimed that one PKK militant who was involved in this massacre, was killed during the conflict. 7. Army Corps commander and martial law commander of the time Lieutenant General Kaya Yazgan, Diyarbakır Governor İhsan Dede, Siirt Governor Recep Birsin Özen with his cortege visited the village on 4 December 1984 which had 200 inhabitants and 40 house, also they sent food aid, cloth aid, stationery aid as well as 7 long barreled Kalashnikov and bullet aid.

On 9 May 1985, 19 detained suspects are accused of killings of 9 women and children in Karagecit village by military prosecutor in the first trial at 7. Army Corps and Martial Law Diyarbakir Military Court. It was demanded death penalty for seven suspects and six times for Mustafa Çimen who was the number one suspect.

Mustafa Çimen who was accused for leader of this massacre, was arrested on 19 December 1984. In his interrogation, he accepted that he was the leader of the massacre with this words: “It is required to think the end when started. We did not know. We was cheated…. I was leader of the group. We received a kill order. It was the only thing which I can just follow the orders according to attitude of my mind. I cannot look at all of yours faces. I regretted. Forgive me."

To ask death penalty for Mustafa Çimen five or six times, he applied to court for first time implemented laws like “remorse law” and “Social Integration Law”. This application was accepted by the court and suspect [Mustafa Cimen] was sentenced to 24 years heavy imprisonment. Mustafa Cimen, who was military and political helper of Mahsum Korkmaz, was discharged in 1990. The same year, PKK militants killed him.

PKK attacked to Karagecit village on 18 September 1987 third time and last, in addition to PKK killed 6 Kurdish origin Turkish civilians that victim's names are: Ali Bahsi (55), Bahar Bahsi (30), Yusuf Yıldırım (45), Zeynep Şahin (27), Ömer Timur (22), Ali Gök (?).

Karageçit village, which is an ancient cave village, was evacuated in 1992 and there is no any residents by 2021 year.
