= Siege of Silvan (2015) =

- Part of Kurdish–Turkish conflict (2015–present)
Date	3–14 November 2015 (1 week and 4 days)
Location	Silvan, Turkey

Belligerents
Turkey: Jandarma; Turkish Police Force	Kurdistan Workers' Party (PKK): YDG-H

Casualties and losses
1 gendarmerie and 2 policemen killed	10 killed
- 2 civilians killed

In November 2015, Turkish security forces initiated the siege of Silvan - an operation and curfew imposed in the city of Silvan against the PKK-affiliated group YDG-H. The curfew was imposed on 3 November 2015, and lifted on 14 November.

== Background ==
On 2 October 2015, the Turkish military raided Silvan with artillery support. The YDG-H dug trenches and justified their resistance against the Turkish government by citing the atrocities suffered by the Kurdish people under Turkish rule. The government continues to refuse acknowledgment of certain Kurdish rights.

== Curfew ==
The curfew began on 3 November 2015, and lasted until 14 November. During this time, military and police forces conducted anti-terror operations in the three neighborhoods of Konak, Mescit, and Tekel. The Turkish military deployed helicopters and tanks against the town. Locals reported that the town's 90,000 residents faced shortages of food, water, and electricity.

== Casualties ==
As of 11 November 2015, at least seven people were killed in the siege, including two civilians and a policeman. Silvan's mayor, Kerem Canpolaten, mentioned that 11,000 inhabitants of the town had left due to the fighting.

== See also ==
- Kurdistan
- Kurds in Turkey
- Kurdish people
