= Çevrimli massacre =

1990 massacre in Şırnak Province, Turkey

- Part of Kurdish–Turkish conflict (1978–present)
- Location: Çevrimli, Güçlükonak, Turkey
- Date: June 11, 1990
- Target: Civilians
- Attack type: Massacre, attack
- Deaths: 27
- Injuries: 6
- Perpetrator: Kurdistan Workers' Party (PKK)

The Çevrimli massacre occurred on June 11, 1990, when PKK militants carried out an attack in the village of Çevrimli in the Güçlükonak district of Şırnak Province, Turkey. Twenty-seven people—including 12 children and seven women—were killed and six others were injured, while four guards and one PKK member died during the ensuing clash.
