= Seventy-second firman of the Yazidis =

Genocide campaign in the Ottoman Empire

Seventy-second firman of the Yazidi
- Part of the late Ottoman genocides
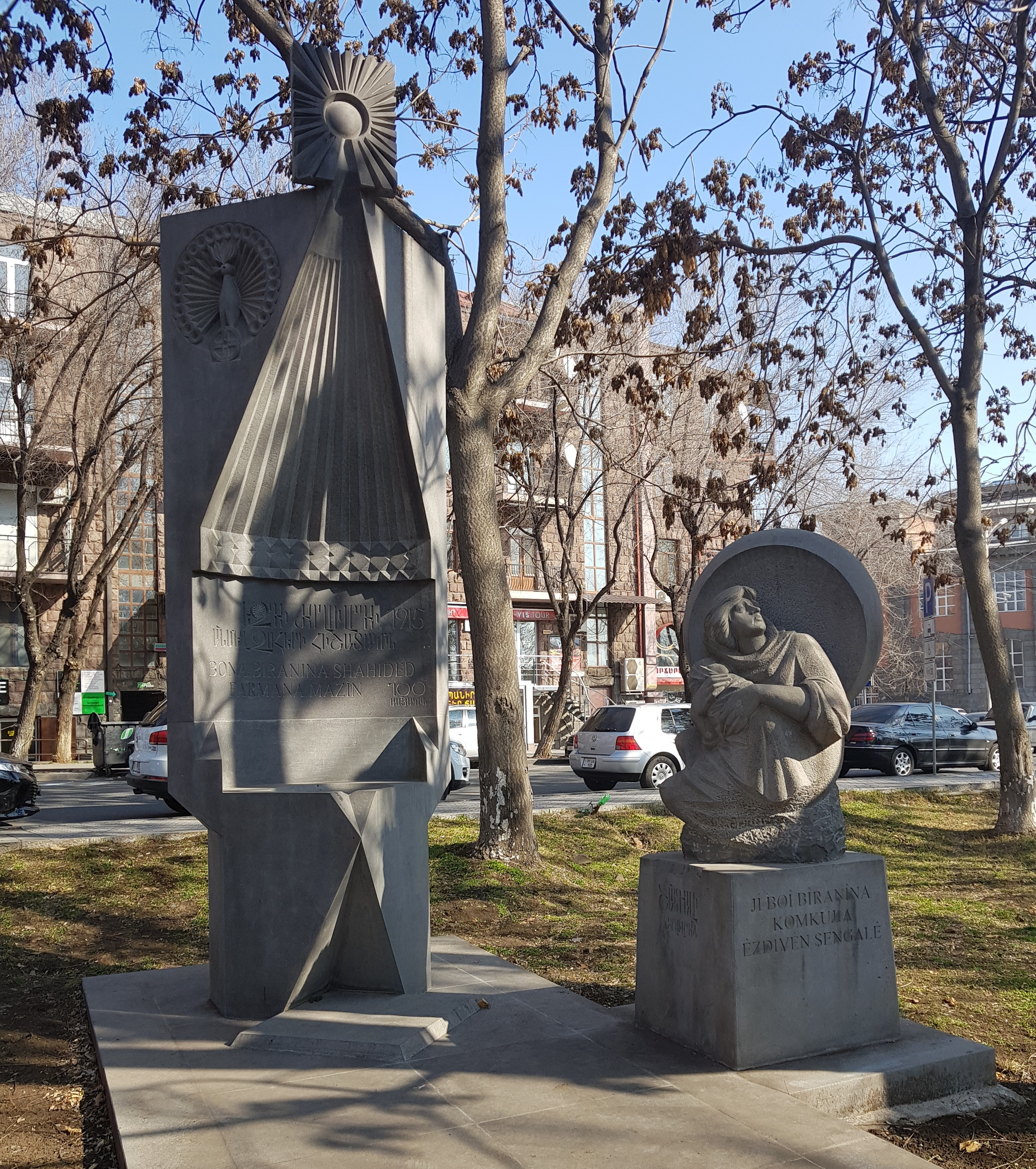
- Memorial to the victims of the 1915 Yazidi genocide (left) in Yerevan.
- Location: Ottoman Empire
- Date: 1915–1917
- Deaths: Unknown
- Perpetrators: Ottoman Empire, Kurdish tribes
- Motive: Anti-Yazidi sentiment, Islamization, Kurdification, Turkification

The seventy-second firman of the Yazidi, also known as a Yazidi genocide, refers to the mass killing, forced displacement, and forced conversion of Yazidis by Ottoman and allied Kurdish forces during World War I. This genocide is part of the broader pattern of genocidal violence against various minorities during the collapse of the Ottoman Empire. This genocide has been remembered by Yazidi communities as another ferman.

== Background ==
The Yazidis are an ethnoreligious group that had been marginalized under Ottoman rule due to their distinct religious practices and beliefs. They had long been subjected to persecution, and through the 19th century many chose to emigrate outside of the Ottoman Empire to avoid such persecution. During the disintegration of the Ottoman Empire in World War I, the Ottomans with their allied Kurdish tribes targeted Yazidis, alongside Armenians and Assyrians, in a series of violent campaigns. These campaigns were driven by a desire to Islamize the non-Muslim populations of the Ottoman Empire, and to eliminate perceived threats to the new national identity forming in the region. It is also believed that another reason why the Yazidis were targeted was due to the refusal to serve in the army, which went against their religion.

== Massacres ==
Yazidis were massacred alongside Armenians, Assyrians, and Pontic Greeks during the Late Ottoman genocides. Between 1915 and 1917, Ottoman forces with the help of Kurdish tribesmen, carried out massacres against Yazidi communities on the border between the Russian Empire and the Ottoman Empire. Yazidis had to flee from Mardin, Midyat, Viranşehir and Batman and had fled to Sinjar, Afrin and the Kurdish Mountains in Iraq and Syria.

Turkey denies the genocide. During the genocide there was the slogan that "those who kill 7 Armenians will go to heaven", with a variant also existing which substituted Yazidis for Armenians. According to Aziz Tamoyan, over 300,000 Yazidis were killed alongside the Armenians, while others fled to Transcaucasia.

Women were often enslaved or forced to convert to Islam. The campaigns resulted in the deaths of thousands of Yazidis. The massacres were part of the broader pattern of genocidal violence against various minorities during the collapse of the Ottoman Empire.

=== Flight of the Hesinî tribal confederation ===
During the final stages of the Caucasus Campaign in the First World War, the withdrawal of Russian forces following the November Revolution led to a deterioration of conditions for local populations, including Yazidis belonging to the Hesinî tribal confederacy. As Russian troops abandoned previously occupied territories such as the Surmeli district, advancing Ottoman forces reportedly subjected Yazidi inhabitants to persecution, prompting large-scale displacement.

Many Yazidis crossed the Aras River into areas of the Ararat plain under Russian control, where they sought temporary refuge. These groups were joined by additional Yazidi refugees fleeing from the Van region and the Bayazid sanjak, as well as Armenian and Assyrian civilians escaping violence. Local Armenian and Yazidi residents in the region provided assistance to the incoming refugees.

Accounts describe cooperation between Yazidi and Armenian leaders during this period. The generals Andranik and Jangir Agha fought together against the Ottoman army from 1915 to 1916, and then from 1917 to 1918. Armenian figures Khachatur Agha and Vasil Agha are reported to have maintained relations with the family of Usub Bek Temuryan, son of Hasan Agha, a Yazidi notable. During the years of conflict between 1915 and 1920, such relationships are described as contributing to local defense efforts against Ottoman forces. In 1920, members of the Usub Bek Temuryan family and their relatives resettled in the village of Şamiram, which had been abandoned.

During the period of the First Republic of Armenia (1918–1920), Usub Bek served as a representative of Kurdish communities, including Yazidis, in the Armenian parliament.

Despite expectations among Yazidi refugees that they might eventually return to their places of origin, subsequent political developments hindered this. The establishment of Soviet control in the region and the redrawing of borders resulted in the former Russian-occupied territories being transferred to Turkey, preventing return migration. As a result, many Yazidi refugees remained permanently on the opposite bank of Aras River.

=== Exodus to the Caucasus ===
In response to the massacres during WWI, many Yazidis fled from the Van, Kars and Dogubayazit regions of eastern Turkey into the Caucasus and Iraq. Before migrating, Yazidis formed an integral part of Kurdish tribal interactions during the Ottoman Empire. The Yazidis who arrived during this period into Armenia and Georgia primarily settled in villages across Ashtarak, Echmiadzin and Armavir, where they rebuilt their communities, with 12,000 Yazidis living in Armenia as of 2019.

=== Massacre of the Basiyan tribe ===
The Basiyan, a Yazidi tribe residing in the Siirt region of eastern Anatolia, suffered a massacre during World War I. In May 1916, Ottoman forces and tribal militias carried out an attack against the Yazidi Basiyan tribe. The operation was led by the Muslim Kurdish tribal leaders Ahmed Şahin, head of the Miran tribe, and Findi Qoli Mehmedî, leader of the Batwa tribe and a commander of the Hamidiye regiments.

On 14 May, the village itself, which had a population of around 380, was massacred after the villagers rejected an ultimatum to either convert to Islam or face death; only 45 survived according to one account. On 16th May 1916, following discussions among local tribal leaders, a large armed force was dispatched under the leadership of the Muslim Kurdish tribal leaders Ahmed Şahin and Findi Qoli Mehmedi to confront the 580 members of the tribe near the Hezil River, where they were surrounded and given an ultimatum to convert to Islam or be killed.

A massacre ensued. Many of the Yazidi women of the village of Bāsā threw themselves into the Tigris, dying instead of allowing themselves to be captured by the attacking forces. The bodies of several were later recovered near the village of Çikan on the Tigris, with more recovered from the river near Zakho. Of the whole tribe, only 35 members survived the massacre. The survivors eventually fled to Sharya, in what is now Duhok Governorate in Iraq, where their descendants still reside.

== Legacy ==
In the Battle of Abaran, the soldiers of the Government of the Grand National Assembly persecuted and displaced both Armenian and Yazidi populations.

Academics classify the Yazidi massacres as part of the Ottoman Empire's systematic campaign against non-Muslim minorities during World War I.

While the 1915 Yazidi genocide is often overshadowed by other genocides of the time, it remains a traumatic part of Yazidi history. The memory of the 1915 atrocities has resurfaced in recent years, especially following the 2014 genocide carried out by ISIS in 2014, drawing similarities between the two events. Kurdish organisations have condemned and have acknowledged the actions of their ancestors that took part in this genocide.

There has also been a monument made for the victims for the genocide and the 2014 genocide in Yerevan, which is known as the first monument dedicated to the innocent victims of the Yazidi people in the world. Syriac representatives in 2015 have also demanded for the recognition of the genocide by Russia, with the party United Russia proposing a law that would punish the denial of the 1915 genocides.

== See also ==
- Armenian genocide
- Persecution of Yazidis
- Yazidism in Turkey
