= Piyangotepe massacre =

Massacre in Turkey

The Piyangotepe Massacre was a mass killing in Turkey on May 16, 1979. The massacre resulted in the death of 7 people and the injury of 2 others. A generally left-wing coffeehouse was raided by right-wing militants in Piyangotepe, Ankara. Ali Bülent Orkan, one of the defendants, was executed after the September 12 coup.

== Massacre ==
On May 16, 1979, on Refik Saydam Street in the Piyangotepe district of Keçiören district, was destroyed by right-wingers Ali Bülent Orkan, Nurullah Akdoğan, Erol Türkmen and Hasan. The militants asked those in the cafe to lie on the ground. At that time, 20 people in the coffee house complied. The attackers opened fire randomly on the people lying on the ground. The fatalities were Hüsamettin Kurban, Tuncay Sarıkaya, Mızrap Ali Taşkın, Erdoğan Doğan, Müslüm Doğan, Mehmet Turan, and Ahmet Turan. 2 people were seriously injured. The attackers fled in a taxi.

== Trial ==
A statement by the Ankara Police Department on May 31, 1979, claimed that the defendants were also involved in various killings, injuries and rape before and after the incident. Ankara Police Department described the incident as follows:

"The taxi with license plate 06 AT 126 belonging to Rıza Tüfekçi, used in the robbery, was usurped by Nurullah Akdoğan and Erol Türkmen, nicknamed 'Hasret', who were riding in front of the SBF as customers. The driver was taken to Bayındır Dam and tied to a tree. With the same car, Kırşehir Prison escapee Hüseyin Bozkurt. "Ali Bülent Orkan, who uses his pseudonym and an identified person, came to Çelik Kıraathanesi. Meanwhile, Akdoğan was waiting in the car, while three other armed people opened fire on those who were lying on the ground with three 14-gun pistols, which were determined to be used in various incidents."

The main suspect of the massacre, Ali Bülent Orkan, was caught in İzmir on October 12, 1980.

One of the defendants, Erol Türkmen, raided the house of Chief Inspector Hikmet Sökmener in Ankara on October 17, 1980. He injured Sökmener's wife, Bilgen Sökmener, and killed Sökmener's 12-year-old daughter. After the incident, under police pressure, Turkmen committed suicide by squeezing himself in the head.

Ali Bülent Orkan was tried in Ankara Martial Law No. 1 Military Court and was sentenced to death on 24 June 1981. The Military Court of Cassation Chambers approved the execution on February 25, 1982. The decision was also accepted by the Consultative Assembly and was finally approved at the 112th meeting of the National Security Council, under the chairmanship of President Gen. Kenan Evren. Orkan was executed by hanging in Ankara Central Closed Prison on 13 August 1982.
