= Çetinkaya Store massacre =

Massacre in Istanbul, Turkey, 1991

- Part of Kurdistan Workers' Party insurgency
- Location: Bakirköy, Istanbul, Turkey
- Date: December 25, 1991; 13:00
- Target: Civilians
- Attack type: Arson
- Deaths: 12
- Injuries: 14
- Perpetrator: Kurdistan Workers' Party (PKK)

The Çetinkaya Store massacre occurred on December 25, 1991, when PKK militants organized an unauthorized demonstration march in Bakırköy, Istanbul. During the event, they hurled Molotov cocktails at targets including Egebank, Kit, Arçelik, Emlak Bank, and the Çetinkaya store. A fire broke out at the store, which was owned by Necati Çetinkaya—the brother of the then-Regional Governor of Emergency—and resulted in the deaths of 12 people, including eight women and one child. In connection with the incident, 47 individuals were arrested, and 14 people were injured.
