= Ortabağ massacre =

Bombing in Ortadağ, Uludere, Şirnak, Turkey

- Part of the Kurdish–Turkish conflict (1978–present)
- Location: Ortabağ, Uludere
- Date: 23 January 1987
- Attack type: Bombing
- Weapon: Grenade
- Deaths: 8
- Injuries: 15
- Perpetrator: Kurdistan Workers' Party

Ortabağ massacre was a bomb attack carried out by the Kurdistan Workers' Party on 23 January 1987 in the Ortabağ village of Uludere district of Şırnak, Turkey.

The attack occurred at a house in the Ortabağ village, where a wedding was taking place. PKK members climbed onto the roof of the house and threw hand grenades into the chimney while the wedding was in progress. The explosions caused the deaths of Nasır Yakut, Hatice Yakut, Mehmet Sıddık Yakut, Hamne Yakut, Tijan Everek and Nimet Yakut, who were found in the house. Hüseyin Yakut and Perihan Yakut, who were seriously injured in the attack, were taken to Cizre State Hospital, where they were admitted into an intensive care unit, but later lost their lives. Of the 8 people who lost their lives in the attack, 2 were children and 4 were women. 15 people survived the massacre with differing injuries. Three of the injured (Şirin Abdin, İsa Oslu, Davut Ayrık) were village guards.

The motive of the attack is unclear, but it is widely recognized to be a part of the ongoing Kurdish-Turkish conflict.
