= Pınarcık, Ömerli =

Village in Mardin Province, Turkey

Pınarcık
- Neighbourhood
- Location in Turkey
- Coordinates: 37.326°N 40.908°E
- Country: Turkey
- Province: Mardin
- District: Ömerli
- Population (2021): 55
- Time zone: UTC+3 (TRT)

Pınarcık (Kurdish: Xerzikê Erebo) is a neighbourhood in the municipality and district of Ömerli, Mardin Province in Turkey. The village is populated by Kurds of the Omerkan tribe and had a population of 55 in 2021.

== See also ==
- Pınarcık massacre
