= Zini Rift Massacre =

Massacre of Kurds in Turkey

The Zini Rift Massacre was the murder of 95 Alevi-Kurdish civilians on 6 August 1938 in the Kılıçkaya village (or Zini Gedik) of Erzincan Province, Turkey. After the Dersim rebellion, some of the people of the region were exiled to Balıkesir and Keşan.

The bones, which came to the surface due to soil erosion, mobilized the families of those who lost their lives in the incident, and on September 9, 2011, they applied to the Erzincan Chief Public Prosecutor's Office for the examination of the mass grave. Erzincan Prosecutor Mehmet Can Mıhçı gave a decision of non-prosecution on September 28, 2011, because the incident regarding the application made was the Dersim Massacre, "an event related to the issue of public order", that it could not be called genocide, and that it had already entered the statute of limitations. Later, it was understood that he had quoted the decision of Tunceli Prosecutor Ümit Aydın, who gave the decision of non-prosecution for the Dersim Events, and the definitions of five Turkish lawyers regarding the crime of genocide.
