= Beyazıt massacre =

1978 terrorist incident in Turkey

Beyazıt Massacre
- Beyazıt massacre (Istanbul) Beyazıt massacre (Turkey)
- Location: 41.01104°N 28.96269°E; Beyazıt Square, Istanbul, Turkey
- Date: 16 March 1978
- Target: Left-wing students
- Deaths: 7
- Injuries: 41
- Perpetrator: Grey Wolves

The Beyazıt massacre (Turkish: Beyazıt katliamı) or 16 March massacre (Turkish: 16 Mart katliamı) of 16 March 1978 was the massacre of students at Istanbul University, in which seven died and 41 were injured in a bomb-and gun attack. The head of the Istanbul branch of the Grey Wolves, Orhan Çakıroğlu, was sentenced to 11 years in 1980; he was released on appeal in 1982. After the 30-year statute of limitations expired the mother of one of the shooters admitted his involvement, and said he had received orders from a police officer. A witness said the police did not pursue the attackers at the scene.

== See also ==
- List of massacres in Turkey
