= Pınarcık massacre =

Massacre of Turkish citizens in Turkey by the PKK in 1987

- Location: Pınarcık, Ömerli, Mardin Province, Turkey
- Date: 20 June 1987
- Attack type: Massacre, shooting, arson
- Deaths: 32
- Perpetrator: Kurdistan Workers' Party

The Pinarcik massacre was the killing of 24 Kurdish women and children and eight village guards on 20 June 1987, in the village of Pınarcık, in the Mardin Province of Turkey, by ARGK units of the Kurdistan Workers' Party (PKK). The dead consisted of 16 children, eight village guards, and eight women. Aliza Marcus, a specialist on the conflict, describes it as "the PKK's most brutal attack on villagers since the state-sponsored militia had been formed".

== Incident ==
One June evening in 1987, men who were apparently PKK rebels partly encircled Pınarcık. It was later at night where one of eight Pınarcık's Turkish state-financed village guard recalled that the attackers shouted at them to surrender, but the guards apparently did not pay much attention.

The attackers fired directly on the village. The guards fought back, but they were outnumbered nearly four-to-one and, as one man later complained, hobbled by a lack of sufficient ammunition. According to Turkish authorities, thirty men then descended upon the village and continued the shoot-out with the village guards. The firefight lasted more than two hours. At the end, 30 people were dead, 16 children, 6 women and 8 men lay dead. According to the Ankara Domestic Service, the attackers attacked houses using hand grenades and Molotov cocktails, and fired on those fleeing the burning houses.

== Aftermath ==
Serxwebûn, a publication of the PKK, stated that the massacre was a "noble action" carried out by the ARGK militant units of the PKK against village guards in its June 1987 issue. It further described the massacre as "the culmination of a series of actions" against "Turkish colonialism", which included an attack at a farm in Ceylanpınar, the "punishment" of an "agent teacher" and an attack against a Turkish army convoy. Şemdin Sakık, a previous commander of the PKK, wrote that the massacre was ordered by Abdullah Öcalan himself and carried out by special forces under his command.

A day before the attack the European Parliament passed a resolution condemning Turkey for its refusal to recognize the Armenian genocide and issues regarding Kurdish rights, saying that they presented "insurmountable obstacles" ("unüberwindbare Hindernisse") to Turkey's EU membership bid. After the Pınarcık attack, Turkish President Kenan Evren said this resolution had encouraged the PKK to attack Pınarcık to make sure Turkey would be excluded from the EU. Der Spiegel dismissed this claim as "hardly serious" ("kaum ernst gemeint").

The Turkish news agency Hürriyet claimed the attackers had come from Syria, whose border is about 25 km from Pınarcık. In July 1987 Prime Minister Turgut Özal signed an agreement with Syria under which Syria would remove PKK camps from its territory.

Turkish columnist Mehmet Ali Birand, who had distinguished himself for his attempts to write openly about the country's Kurdish issue, called it a crime of "historical" proportions.

=== Ayhan Çarkın allegations ===
Ayhan Çarkın, then a police special forces officer, told Radikal in 2011 that he had visited Pınarcık immediately after the attack: "I went to that village. The smell of blood and gunpowder were [sic] everywhere. The Pınarcık Massacre was actualized by groups formed by JİTEM", an intelligence unit of the Turkish Gendarmerie, "for means of provocation." In a 2002 interview with Hürriyet he said "I have collected the body of a 1.5 months-old baby myself. No one can prove that terrorism is right to me."
