= Vartinis massacre =

Massacre committed by the Turkish Armed Forces

The Vartinis massacre was a massacre committed by the Turkish Armed Forces on October 3, 1993, in the village of Vartinis in the province of Muş, Turkey. In total 9 people (7 of them children) were killed.
