= Bilge, Mazıdağı =

Village in Mardin Province, Turkey

Bilge
- Neighbourhood
- Location in Turkey
- Coordinates: 37.464°N 40.588°E
- Country: Turkey
- Province: Mardin
- District: Mazıdağı
- Population (2021): 150
- Time zone: UTC+3 (TRT)

Bilge (Kurdish: Zanqirt) is a neighbourhood in the municipality and district of Mazıdağı, Mardin Province in Turkey. The village is populated by Kurds of the Barava tribe and had a population of 150 in 2021.

== Wedding party massacre ==
On May 4, 2009, gunmen killed 44 people at a wedding party in Bilge, using grenades and automatic weapons.
