= Bahçelievler, Ankara =

Bahçelievler
- Neighbourhood
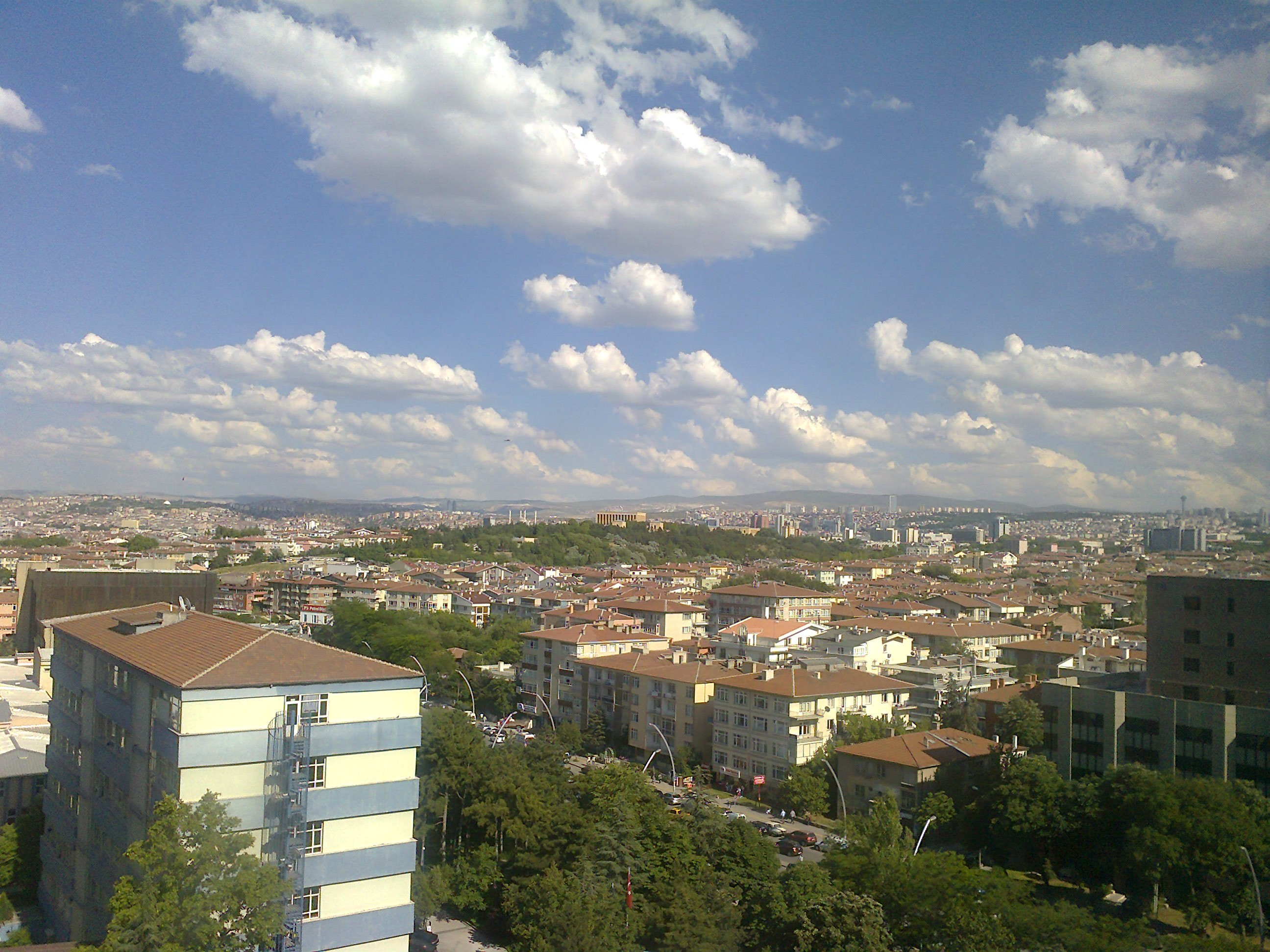

- Location within Turkey Location within Turkey Central Anatolia
- Coordinates: 39.9286°N 32.8272°E
- Country: Turkey
- Province: Ankara
- District: Çankaya
- Population (2022): 10,638
- Time zone: UTC+3 (TRT)

Bahçelievler is a neighbourhood in the municipality and district of Çankaya, Ankara Province, Turkey. Its population is 10,638 (2022). The name means 'houses with gardens' in Turkish.

The neighborhood was known in the 1970s as a battleground for the right and left wing political factions. In particular, it is the place of the Bahçelievler massacre of 8 October 1978, when 7 students, members of the Workers' Party of Turkey, were killed by neo-fascists, see "Multi-party period of the Republic of Turkey".

== Demographics ==
Historical population
Year	Pop.	±% p.a.
2007	13,650	—
2012	12,338	−2.00%
2017	11,412	−1.55%
2022	10,638	−1.39%
Source: TÜIK (2007-2022)

== Places in Bahçelievler, Ankara ==
- The main building of the Turkish National Library system (Milli Kütüphane Başkanlığı) is located here.
- Bahcelievler Culture and Leisure Centre houses four movie theatres, one bowling hall and other facilities.
- Bahcelievler Business Centre is a business and shopping centre of Ankara. It also houses three movie theatres and a number of cafes.
- Ankara Ice Palace, an indoor ice arena, opened in 1989.
