= Lice massacre =

Massacre in Turkey

- Location: Lice, Turkey
- Date: From 20 to 23 October 1993
- Attack type: Massacre, shooting, property damage
- Deaths: +30
- Perpetrator: (Turkey) Turkish Armed Forces

The Lice massacre took place from 20 to 23 October 1993 in the Kurdish town of Lice, Turkey in the Diyarbakır Province of Southeastern Anatolia Region. The Turkish Armed Forces killed at least 30 civilians.

== Background ==
Tensions between Turkish armed forces and the PKK had been rising in the countryside around Lice throughout October 1993. During the earlier part of the month, PKK fighters kidnapped two workers and set fire to a school in the district, and gunshots were heard in the town. On 14 October, PKK militants attacked an electrical transformer outside the town. That same day, units of the Turkish army severed all communications between capital of the predominantly Kurdish district, home to approximately 10,000 people at the time, and its surroundings, which had seen extensive destruction in previous years as the Turkish military razed villages and burned nearby forests in an effort to deny shelter to PKK militants active in the area. Turkish government officials claimed that 12 PKK militants were killed in clashes with Turkish soldiers in Lice on 17 October, although no further details were given and nothing was reported by Kurdish sources.

== Events ==
On 22 (sometimes misreported as 20) October, Brigadier General Bahtiyar Aydın, the regional commander of the Turkish Jandarma in Diyarbakır, was shot and killed in Lice under "unclear" circumstances; Turkish sources state that he was killed during armed clashes that left 16 others dead. He was the highest-ranking Turkish commander to have been killed in the first nine years of the war. Although the PKK denied involvement in the assassination on the grounds that it did not want to provoke retaliatory attacks that could lead to civilian casualties, state media blamed Aydın's death on the group, and the Turkish military began an operation against the town soon afterwards. The massacre has thus been seen as a potential reprisal attack for the general's death.

According to HRW, the incident is one of the worst human rights abuses committed by the Turkish Armed Forces during the Turkish–Kurdish conflict in 1993. In what HRW has called a "grossly disproportionate" use of force Turkish soldiers systematically moved throughout the town, randomly firing live ammunition at the mainly Kurdish civilians and destroying both residential and commercial buildings. By the end of 23 October, at least 30 residents had been killed and a hundred more were wounded, while an estimated 401 homes and 242 businesses were destroyed, according to the Human Rights Foundation of Turkey, which described Lice as having become "ruined and burned out". Little damage was inflicted to state buildings, however.

== Aftermath ==
Turkish politicians—including Prime Minister Tansu Çiller—were prevented by the military from visiting the town in the weeks following the attack, and half of the civilian population quickly abandoned the town. Halil Nebiler, a Turkish journalist for the Istanbul-based daily Cumhuriyet, managed to enter Lice after the operation and said that the Battle of Şırnak seemed "innocent" in comparison, and declared that the town had effectively become "non-existent." Throughout the following year, similar operations were carried out against numerous other Kurdish villages and towns throughout the region, leading to large-scale displacement of the civilian population. By 1995, there were "hardly any inhabited villages left" in Lice and neighbouring Kulp district. Such attacks were intended to intimidate the Kurdish population into not assisting the PKK or otherwise engaging in "pro-Kurdish activity", thus cutting the rebel group off from its local support bases.

In May 1999, three months after the capture of PKK leader Abdullah Öcalan, New York Times journalist Steven Kinzer was able to visit the town with official permission. According to his report, only around 1,000 individuals out of the original population still lived in Lice, which had for the most part been rebuilt. Refugees forcibly displaced from elsewhere in the region had been resettled there, though, bringing the population up to 6,000 people; almost all of the inhabitants, both old and new, were ethnic Kurds. Many of the adult men had been unwillingly pressed into service as "village guards", having been threatened with prison if they did not serve. A large military garrison kept the town a heavy curfew and tightly rationed food and supplies to the locals to prevent them from giving surplus to the much-weakened PKK. Despite their evident fear of security forces, Kinzer indicated that residents maintained a quietly defiant outlook. An absentee candidate from the pro-Kurdish People's Democracy Party had won the recent mayoral elections in Lice; residents claimed that security forces cut the rations of individuals and families suspected of having voted for the party.

=== Legal cases ===
In 1999, the European Commission for Human Rights referred the case Ayder and others v. Turkey (No 23656/94), filed by displaced survivors of the attack, to the European Court of Human Rights. On 8 January 2004, the Court ruled that Turkey was in violation of "Articles 3, 8 and 13 and Article 1 of Protocol No. 1" of the European Convention on Human Rights for "destruction of possessions and homes by security forces and lack of an effective remedy"; the judgement became final in April 2004.

On 22 October 2013, the Diyarbakır 8th High Criminal Court approved indictments against retired General Eşref Hatipoğlu and Lieutenant Tünay Yanardağ for the murder of Brig. Gen. Aydın—two decades after the events took place and one day before the statute of limitations for them expired. Charged with "premeditated murder, encouraging rebel and murder in the society, and organizing to commit a crime", Hatipoğlu, the Jandarma regimental commander in Diyarbakır at the time, faces life imprisonment, while Yanardağ faces a 24-year prison sentence.

Remziye Tosun, deputy of the HDP political party submitted a parliamentary question with regards to a former intelligence officer's confessions about the massacre. She asked the Turkish Minister of Justice Abdülhamit Gül on whether the claims were true and if Başbuğ was connected to JİTEM (a unofficial military organization which has yet to be officially acknowledged, but existence confirmed by former Turkish prime ministers). She also asked if an investigation into those claims will be opened.
