= 2021 Konya massacre =

Massacre in Turkey

- Location: Meram, Konya Province, Turkey
- Date: 30 July 2021
- Target: Kurdish family
- Attack type: mass shooting
- Deaths: 7
- Injuries: 0

The Konya massacre refers to the murder of seven members of a Kurdish family in the Meram district of Konya Province, Turkey, on 30 July 2021. The house where the family was living was set on fire.

== Background ==
The family moved to Konya from Kars Province and had lived for twenty-four years in Meram, Konya. The family was threatened before and attacked in front of their home in May 2021. In the attack in May, several family members needed medical assistance, one man received a wound on the head which required twenty stitches, another member of the family was stabbed, and a woman's arm was broken. According to an interview given by members of the family to Duvar, the attackers where close to the far-right Nationalist Movement Party (MHP) and threatened not to permit Kurds to live in the neighborhood. Several people were apprehended following the attack, but the judge ruled for their release.

== Massacre ==
On 30 July 2021, a man entered the premises of the property of the Dedeoğulları family, then first spoke to them and later shot them. Video surveillance shows the murderer attempting to set the house ablaze, getting into his car and driving away afterwards. Four of the victims were women, three men.

== Investigation ==
The investigation centered on Mehmet Altun, aged 33, as the murderer, who was apprehended on 4 August 2021. The same day, ten of the fourteen detained members of Altuns family were arrested. Four others were released but prohibited to travel abroad. According to Bianet Mehmet Altun has admitted to have killed the family members. He has also admitted to have attempted to set the house ablaze, in order to erase the recordings of the security camera. Twenty-one bullets were found in the bodies of the family. Six members of the family died of shots in the head while one died of a bullet in the neck. Against a journalist reporting on the murders for JinNews, an investigation was initiated due to her social media posts.

== Reactions ==
There are different perceptions of the murders. While the Turkish Government states there was no racism involved, pro-Kurdish politicians and also the Kurdish media speak of a racist attack. The Turkish Minister of the Interior Süleyman Soylu and other Turkish officials denied an ethnic motive behind the murders and blamed it on a decade old feud between two families. They stated such accusation were a "provocation to the country's unity". Mithat Sancar of the pro-Kurdish Peoples' Democratic Party (HDP) accused the Government led by the Justice and Development Party for creating the environment for such racist attacks. An angered member of a Kurdish-Islamic organization known as "Kurdistan Islamic Society" released a statement heavily condemning the murder.

A journalist of the Mezapotamya Agency who was covering the massacre, was accused of writing a "pro-terrorist story" by a Konya-based newspaper. Coalition for Women in Journalism (CFWIJ) condemned the targeting of the journalist, also stating it is a pro-government newspaper outlet.
