= Rawanduz District =

Rawanduz District قەزای ڕەواندز Qezayê Rewandiz
- District
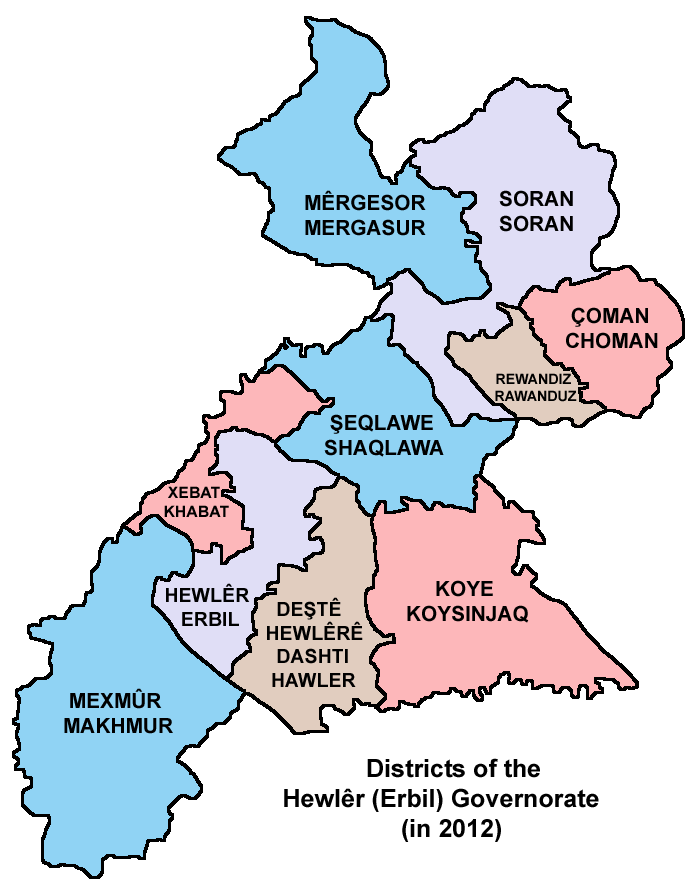
- Districts of Erbil Governorate (in 2012)
- Country: Iraq
- Autonomous region: Kurdistan
- Governorate: Erbil Governorate
- Seat: Rawanduz

Area
  - Total: 494.8 km^{2} (191.0 sq mi)

Population (2018)
  - Total: 25,641
  - Density: 51.82/km^{2} (134.2/sq mi)
- Time zone: UTC+3 (AST)

Rawanduz District is a district in Iraqi Kurdistan. This district encompasses one sub-district, Warte, and 12 villages. The district is 123 km from Erbil. The administrative centre of the district is Rawanduz. In 2018, the population was estimated at 25,641 people, the area was 494.8 km^{2}, and the population density was 51.82/km^{2}. It is also the oldest district in the Erbil Governorate.

== See also ==
- Rawandiz
- Bekhal Waterfall
