= Warte, Iraq =

Coordinates: 36.50111°N 44.75473°E

Warte (Kurdish: وه‌رتێ, romanized: Warte) is a town located in Rawanduz district in Erbil Governorate, Kurdistan Region in Iraq. It lies 36 km (22 miles) from the city of Rawanduz and lies 30 km (18.6 miles) from the city of Ranya.
