= Iraqi Kurdistan =

Kurdish-populated part of northern Iraq

Coordinates: 36°55′N 44°2′E

Map of the approximate Kurdish-populated region of Iraq, in dark red the federal region of Iraqi Kurdistan

Iraqi Kurdistan or Southern Kurdistan (Kurdish: باشووری کوردستان, romanized: Başûrê Kurdistanê) refers to the Kurdish-populated part of northern Iraq. It is considered one of the four parts of Greater Kurdistan in West Asia, which also includes parts of southeastern Turkey (Northern Kurdistan), northern Syria (Western Kurdistan), and northwestern Iran (Eastern Kurdistan). Much of the geographical and cultural region of Iraqi Kurdistan is part of the Kurdistan Region (KRI), a semi-autonomous region recognized by the Constitution of Iraq. As with the rest of Kurdistan, and unlike most of Iraq, the region is mountainous.

== Etymology ==
The exact origins of the name Kurd are unclear. The suffix -stan is an Iranian term for region. The literal translation for Kurdistan is "Land of Kurds".

The name was also formerly spelled Curdistan. One of the ancient names of Kurdistan is Corduene.

== History ==
=== Pre-Islamic period ===
In prehistoric times, the region was home to a Neanderthal culture such as has been found at the Shanidar Cave. The region was host to the Jarmo culture c. 7000 BCE. The earliest Neolithic site in Kurdistan is at Tell Hassuna, the centre of the Hassuna culture, c. 6000 BCE.

In the Early and Middle Bronze Age, the region was geographically known as Subartu and was inhabited by the Hurrian speaking Subarians along with Gutians and Lullubi. In 2200 BCE, Naram-Sin of Akkad conquered the region and it came under the rule of the Gutians in 2150 BCE. The main cities of the region attested in the inscriptions in this period are Mardaman, Azuhinum, Ninet (Nineveh), Arrapḫa, Urbilum, and Kurda.

In the early 2nd millennium, the region was ruled by the kingdom of Kurda except for two decades in 18th century BCE when it was conquered by the Amorite Shamshi Adad and was incorporated into the Kingdom of Upper Mesopotamia. In the 1760s BCE, the kingdom of Kurda faced an invasion by Elam and Eshnunna during the Babylonian-Elam war and the kingdom eventually sided with Mari and Babylon.

In 16th century BCE, the Mitannians incorporated the region into their Hurrian empire. Following the destruction of the Mitannian Empire by the Hittites, between 14th-13th century BCE the region gradually came under the rule of the Assyrians. Tukulti-Ninurta I in the 13th century BCE finally conquered the whole region and appointed one of his commanders as the governor of the villages and towns of Kurda. Kurda was reduced to a province centering around modern Sinjar. Erbil's name was Akkadianized to Arba-ilu and during the Neo-Assyrian Empire the city was noted for its distinctive cult of Ishtar. The region was partially under the rule of Urartu and the kingdom of Musasir in early 1st millennium BCE. Modern Rawandiz district was a religious center of the Urartians.

The Medes conquered the region in 7th century BCE. Later it came under the rule of the Achaemenids and remained as part of the satrapy of Media. When Xenophon passed through the region in 4th century BCE, it was inhabited by the Medes. In 332 BC the region fell to Alexander the Great and was thereafter ruled by the Greek Seleucid Empire until the middle of the second century BCE when it fell to Mithridates I of Parthia. During the four centuries of the Parthian era (247 BCE to 226 AD), the region was ruled by semi-independent principalities of Barzan and Sharazur, and in 1st century, it was partially under the rule of the Jewish kingdom of Adiabene. Between 3rd and 4th centuries the region was ruled by the House of Kayus until it was incorporated into the Sassanian Empire in 380 AD and it was renamed to Nodshēragān. The region was gradually converted to Christianity between 1st and 5th centuries and Erbil became the seat of the metropolitan of Hadhyab of the Church of the East and it was divided into several bishoprics namely Marga, Beth Garmai, Beth Qardu, Beth MahQard, Beth BihQard, Beth Nuhadra and Shahr-Qard. In Syriac the region was commonly called Beth Qardwaye.

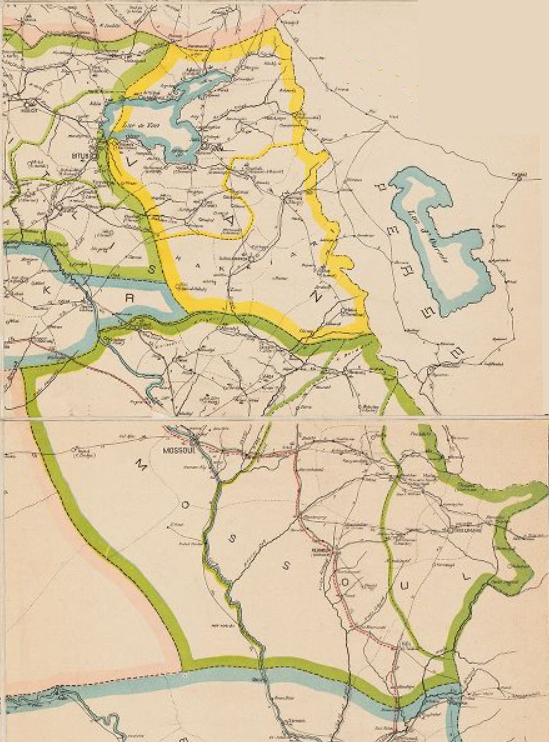
Ottoman vilayets of Van and Mossoul, 1899. Modern Iraqi Kurdistan is covered by the Mosul vilayet (green), which is divided into the sanjaks of Mossoul (Mosul), Kerkouk (Kirkuk and Erbil), and Souleimanié (Sulaymaniyah). To the east is Persia and south is the vilayet of Bagdad.

=== Islamic period ===
The region was conquered by Arab Muslims in the mid 7th century AD as the invading forces conquered the Sassanian Empire, the region fell to Muslims after they fought the Kurds in Mosul and Tikrit 'Utba ibn Farqad captured all the forts of the Kurds when he conquered Erbil in 641. The area became part of the Muslim Arab Rashidun, Umayyad, and later the Abbasid Caliphates, before becoming part of various Iranian, Turkic, and Mongol emirates. Following the disintegration of the Ak Koyunlu, all of its territories including what is modern-day Iraqi Kurdistan passed to the Iranian Safavids in the earliest 16th century.

Between the 16th and 17th century, the area nowadays known as Iraqi Kurdistan, (formerly ruled by three principalities of Baban, Badinan, and Soran) was continuously passed back and forth between archrivals the Safavids and the Ottomans, until the Ottomans managed to decisively seize power in the region starting from the mid 17th century through the Ottoman–Safavid War (1623–39) and the resulting Treaty of Zuhab. In the early 18th century, it briefly passed to the Iranian Afsharids led by Nader Shah. Following Nader's death in 1747, Ottoman suzerainty was reimposed, and in 1831, direct Ottoman rule was established which lasted until World War I, when the Ottomans were defeated by the British.

=== Kurdish revolts under British control ===
During World War I, the British and French divided West Asia in the Sykes-Picot Agreement. The Treaty of Sèvres (which did not enter into force), and the Treaty of Lausanne which superseded it, led to the advent of modern West Asia and the modern Republic of Turkey. The League of Nations granted France mandates over Syria and Lebanon and granted the United Kingdom mandates over Palestine (which then consisted of two autonomous regions: Mandatory Palestine and Transjordan) and what was to become Iraq. Parts of the Ottoman Empire on the Arabian Peninsula were eventually taken over by Saudi Arabia and Yemen.

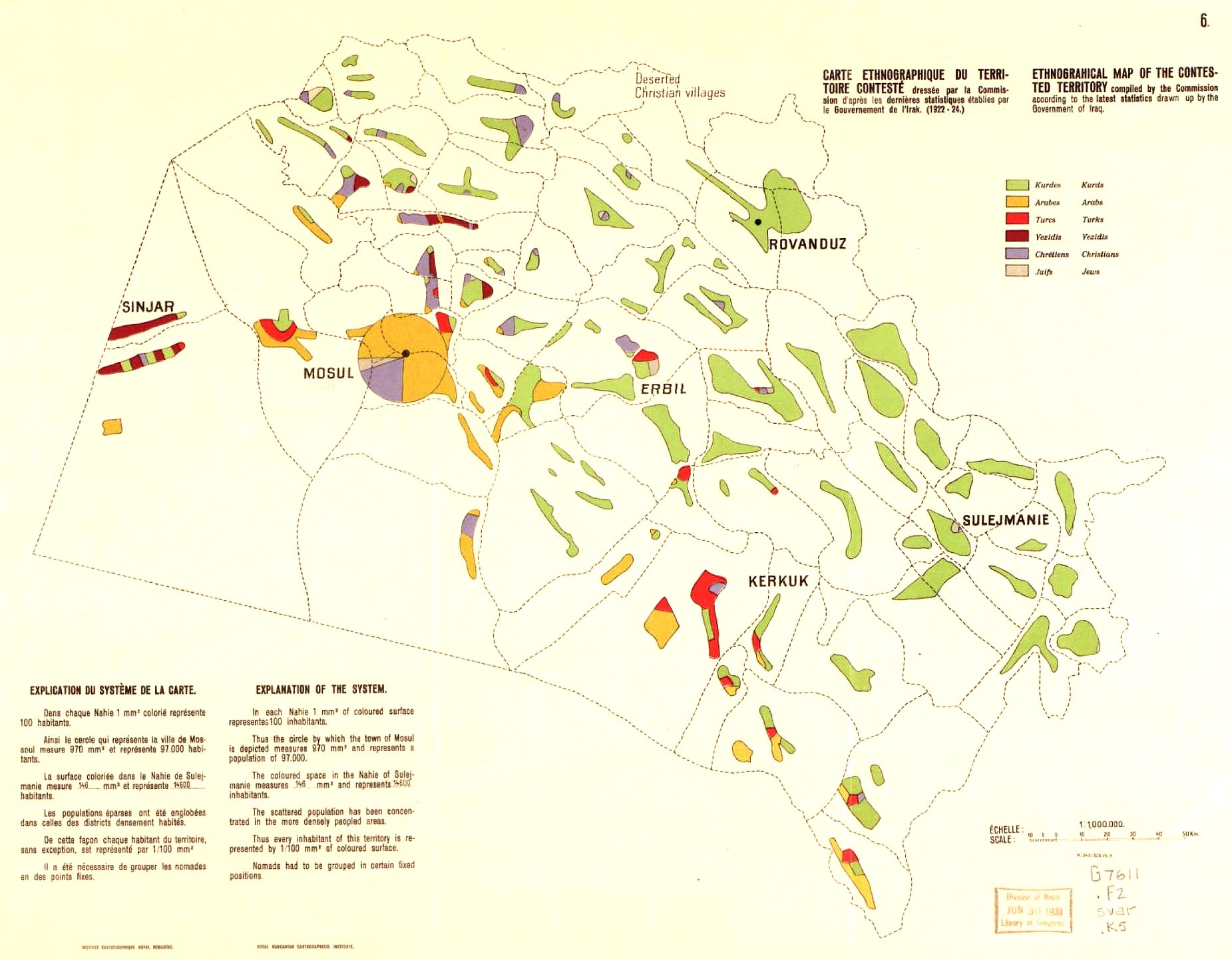
An ethnographical map of the contested territory, compiled by the Commission according to the latest statistics drawn up by the Government of Iraq (1922–1924), League of Nations. Green shows the Kurdish population in the region, while yellow is used for Arabs and purple for Yazidis

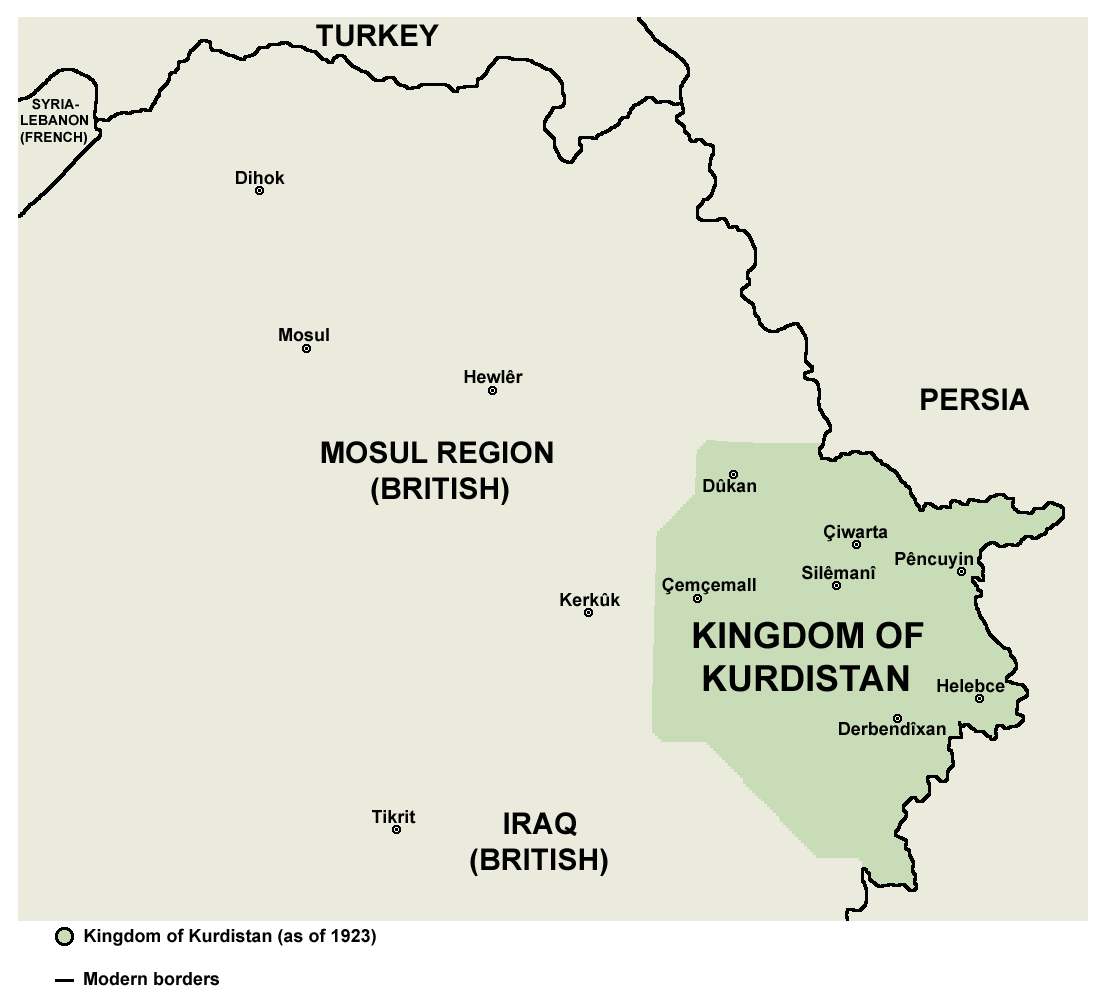
Kingdom of Kurdistan in 1923

In 1922, Britain restored Shaikh Mahmud Barzanji to power, hoping that he would organize the Kurds to act as a buffer against the Turks, who had territorial claims over Mosul and Kirkuk. However, defiant to the British, in 1922, Shaikh Mahmud declared a Kurdish Kingdom with himself as king. It took two years for the British to bring Kurdish areas into submission, while Shaikh Mahmud found refuge in an unknown location.

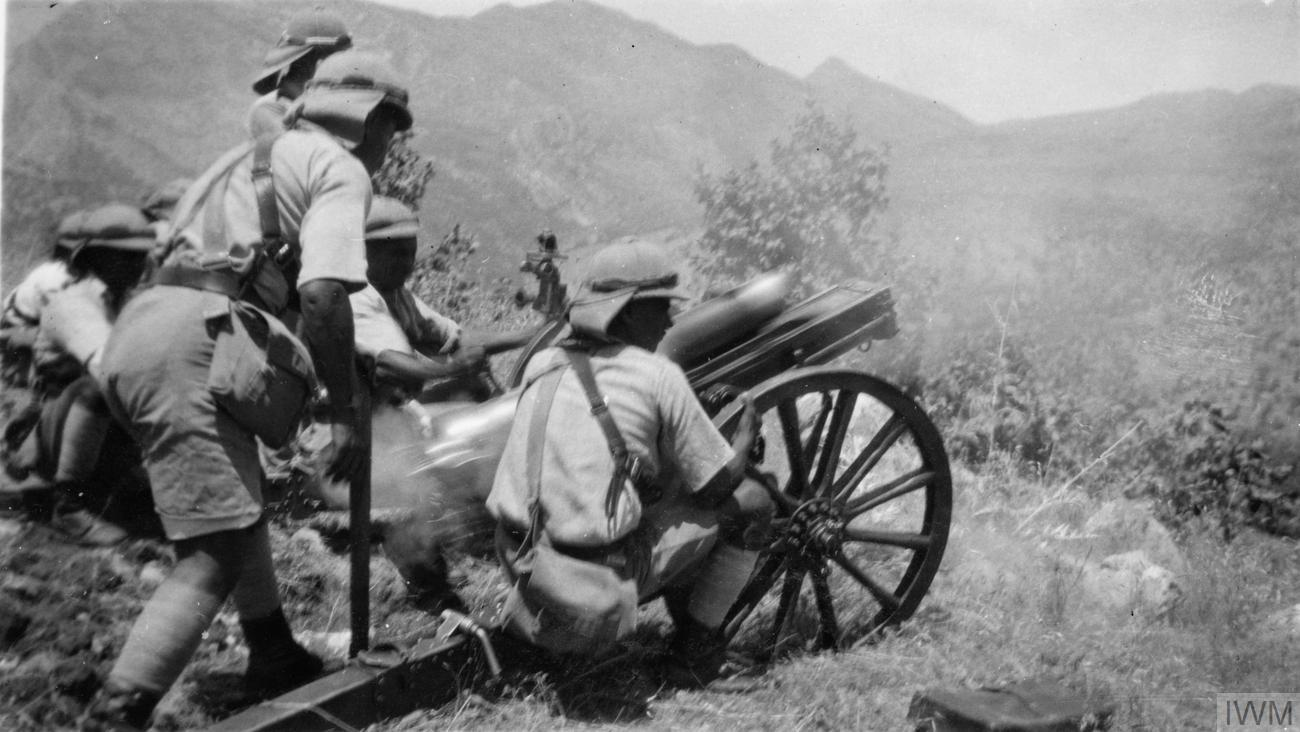
The Barzani revolt, June 1932

In 1930, following the announcement of the admission of Iraq to the League of Nations, Shaikh Mahmud started a third uprising which was suppressed with British air and ground forces.

By 1927, the Barzani clan had become vocal supporters of Kurdish rights in Iraq. In 1929, the Barzani demanded the formation of a Kurdish province in northern Iraq. Emboldened by these demands, in 1931, Kurdish notables petitioned the League of Nations to set up an independent Kurdish government. In late 1931, Ahmed Barzani initiated a Kurdish rebellion against Iraq, and though defeated within several months, the movement gained a major importance in the Kurdish struggle later on, creating the ground for such a notable Kurdish rebel as Mustafa Barzani.

During World War II, the power vacuum in Iraq was exploited by the Kurdish tribes and under the leadership of Mustafa Barzani a rebellion broke out in the north, effectively gaining control of Kurdish areas until 1945, when Iraqis could once again subdue the Kurds with British support. Under pressure from the Iraqi government and the British, the most influential leader of the clan, Mustafa Barzani was forced into exile in Iran in 1945. Later he moved to the Soviet Union after the collapse of the Republic of Mahabad in 1946.

=== Barzani Revolt (1960–1970) ===
After the military coup by Arab nationalists on the 14 July 1958, Mustafa Barzani was invited by Abdul Karim Qasim to return from exile, where he was greeted with a hero's welcome. As part of the deal arranged between Qasim and Barzani, Qasim had promised to give the Kurds regional autonomy in return for Barzani's support for his policies. The Provisional Constitution described Iraq being included in the Arab world but saw the Kurds as partners within an Iraqi statehood and the coat of arms included a Kurdish dagger besides the Arab sword. Meanwhile, during 1959–1960, Barzani became the head of the Kurdistan Democratic Party (KDP), which was granted legal status in 1960. By early 1960, it became apparent that Qasim would not follow through with his promise of regional autonomy. As a result, the KDP began to agitate for regional autonomy. In the face of growing Kurdish dissent, as well as Barzani's personal power, Qasim began to incite the Barzanis historical enemies, the Baradost and Zebari tribes, which led to intertribal warfare throughout 1960 and early 1961.

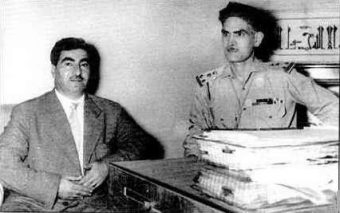
Mustafa Barzani and Abd al-Karim Qasim

By February 1961, Barzani had successfully defeated the pro-government forces and consolidated his position as leader of the Kurds. At this point, Barzani ordered his forces to occupy and expel government officials from all Kurdish territory. This was not received well in Baghdad, and the Third Kurdish Teachers Congress was cancelled and Qasim even denied that "Kurds" constituted an own nation. Qasim began to prepare for a military offensive against the north to return government control of the region. Meanwhile, in June 1961, the KDP issued a detailed ultimatum to Qasim outlining Kurdish grievances, demanding that the Kurdish language would become an official language in Kurdish majority regions. Qasim ignored the Kurdish demands and continued his planning for war.

It was not until September 10, when an Iraqi army column was ambushed by a group of Kurds, that the Kurdish revolt truly began. In response to the attack, Qasim lashed out and ordered the Iraqi Air Force to indiscriminately bomb Kurdish villages, which ultimately served to rally the entire Kurdish population to Barzani's standard. Due to Qasim's profound distrust of the Iraqi Army, which he purposely failed to adequately arm (in fact, Qasim implemented a policy of ammunition rationing), Qasim's government was not able to subdue the insurrection. This stalemate irritated powerful factions within the military and is said to be one of the main reasons behind the Ba'athist coup against Qasim in February 1963. In November 1963, after considerable infighting amongst the civilian and military wings of the Ba'athists, they were ousted by Abdul Salam Arif in a coup. Then, after another failed offensive, Arif declared a ceasefire in February 1964 which provoked a split among Kurdish urban radicals on one hand and Peshmerga (Freedom fighters) forces led by Barzani on the other.

Barzani agreed to the ceasefire and fired the radicals from the party. Following the unexpected death of Arif, whereupon he was replaced by his brother, Abdul Rahman Arif, the Iraqi government launched a last-ditch effort to defeat the Kurds. This campaign failed in May 1966, when Barzani forces thoroughly defeated the Iraqi Army at the Battle of Mount Handrin, near Rawandiz. At this battle, it was said that the Kurds slaughtered an entire brigade. Recognizing the futility of continuing this campaign, Rahamn Arif announced a 12-point peace program in June 1966, which was not implemented due to the overthrow of Rahman Arif in a 1968 coup by the Ba'ath Party.

The Ba'ath government started a campaign to end the Kurdish insurrection, which stalled in 1969. This can be partly attributed to the internal power struggle in Baghdad and also tensions with Iran. Moreover, the Soviet Union pressured the Iraqis to come to terms with Barzani. A peace plan was announced in March 1970 and provided for broader Kurdish autonomy. The plan also gave Kurds representation in government bodies, to be implemented in four years. Despite this, the Iraqi government embarked on an Arabization program in the oil rich regions of Kirkuk and Khanaqin in the same period.

In the following years, Baghdad government overcame its internal divisions and concluded a treaty of friendship with the Soviet Union in April 1972 and ended its isolation within the Arab world. On the other hand, Kurds remained dependent on the Iranian military support and could do little to strengthen their forces.

=== Second Kurdish Iraqi War Algiers Agreement ===
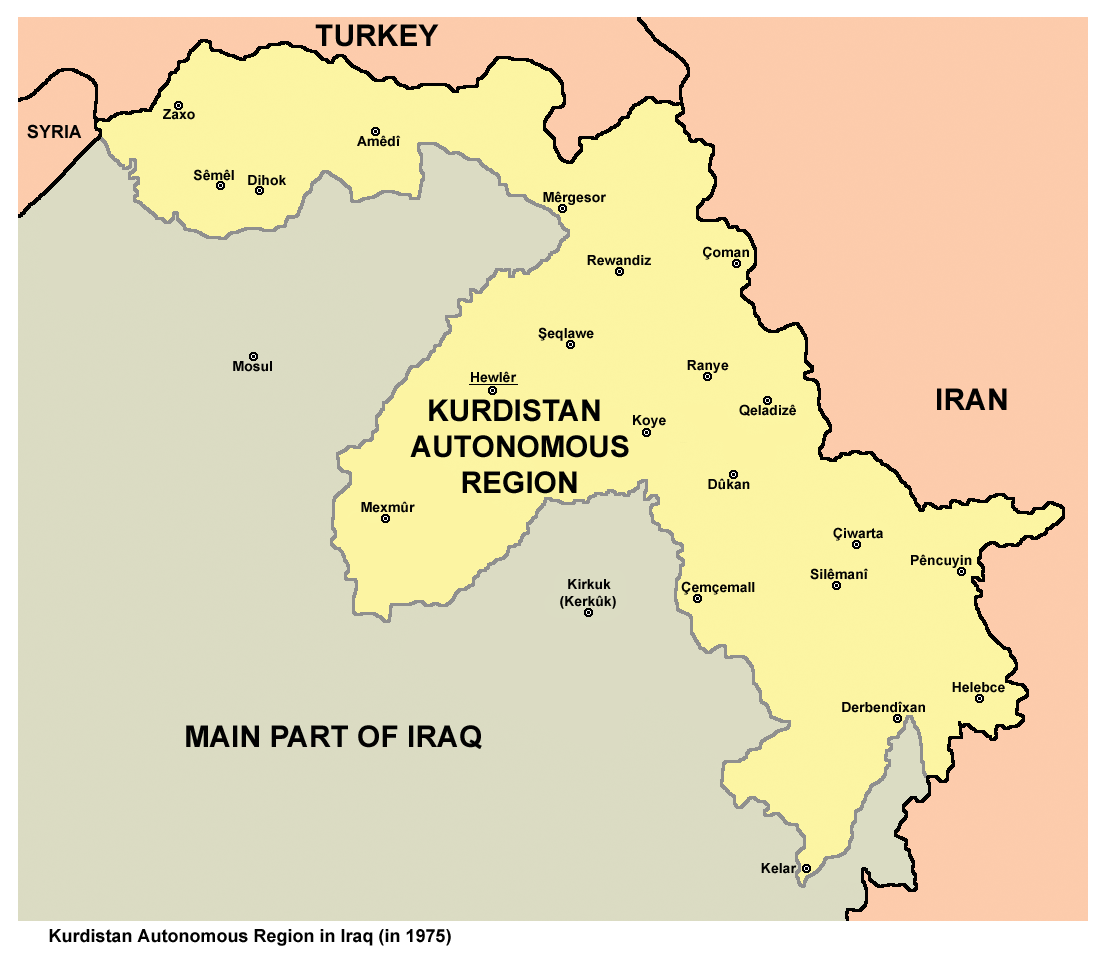
Kurdistan Autonomous Region in 1975

In 1973, the US made a secret agreement with the Shah of Iran to begin covertly funding Kurdish rebels against Baghdad through the Central Intelligence Agency and in collaboration with the Mossad, both of which would be active in the country through the launch of the Iraqi invasion and into the present. By 1974, the Iraqi government retaliated with a new offensive against the Kurds and pushed them close to the border with Iran. Iraq informed Tehran that it was willing to satisfy other Iranian demands in return for an end to its aid to the Kurds. With mediation by Algerian President Houari Boumediene, Iran and Iraq reached a comprehensive settlement in March 1975 known as the Algiers Pact. The agreement left the Kurds helpless and Tehran cut supplies to the Kurdish movement. Barzani went to Iran with many of his supporters. Others surrendered en masse and the rebellion ended after a few days.

As a result, the Iraqi government extended its control over the northern region after 15 years and in order to secure its influence, started an Arabization program by moving Arabs to the vicinity of oil fields in northern Iraq, particularly those around Kirkuk, and other regions, which were populated by Turkmen, Kurds and Christians. The repressive measures carried out by the government against the Kurds after the Algiers agreement led to renewed clashes between the Iraqi Army and Kurdish guerrillas in 1977. In 1978 and 1979, 600 Kurdish villages were burned down and around 200,000 Kurds were deported to the other parts of the country.

=== Arabization campaign and PUK insurgency ===
The Ba'athist government of Iraq forcibly displaced and culturally Arabized minorities (Kurds, Yezidis, Assyrians, Shabaks, Armenians, Turkmen, Mandeans), in line with settler colonialist policies, from the 1960s to the early 2000s, in order to shift the demographics of North Iraq towards Arab domination. The Baath party under Saddam Hussein engaged in active expulsion of minorities from the mid-1970s onwards. In 1978 and 1979, 600 Kurdish villages were burned down and around 200,000 Kurds were deported to the other parts of the country.

The campaigns took place during the Iraqi–Kurdish conflict, being largely motivated by the Kurdish–Arab ethnic and political conflict. Arab settlement programs reached their peak during the late 1970s, in line with depopulation efforts of the Ba'athist regime. The Baathist policies motivating those events are sometimes referred to as "internal colonialism", described by Dr. Francis Kofi Abiew as a "Colonial 'Arabization'" program, including large-scale Kurdish deportations and forced Arab settlement in the region.

=== Iran–Iraq War and Anfal Campaign ===
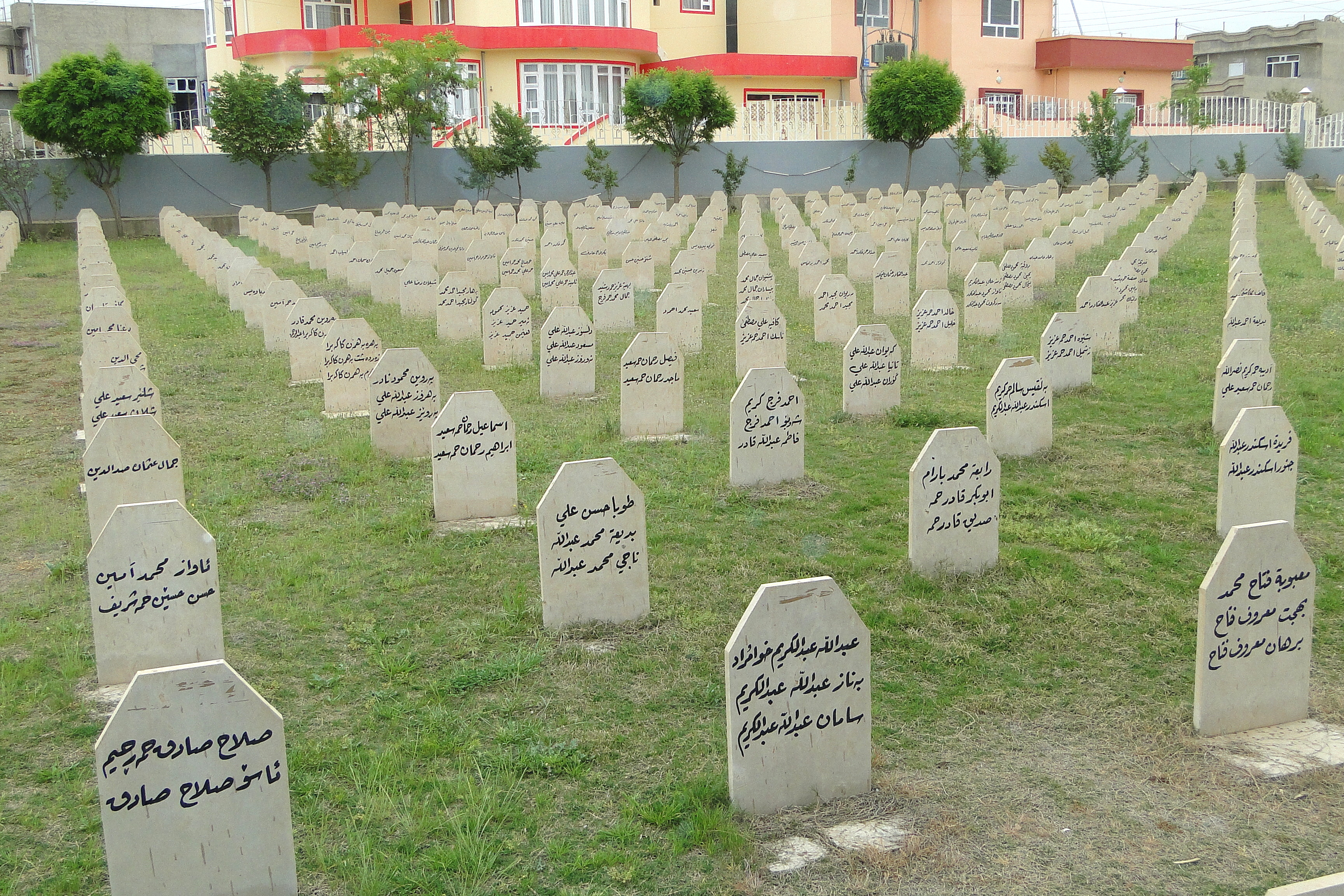
Graves of the Halabja chemical attack victims

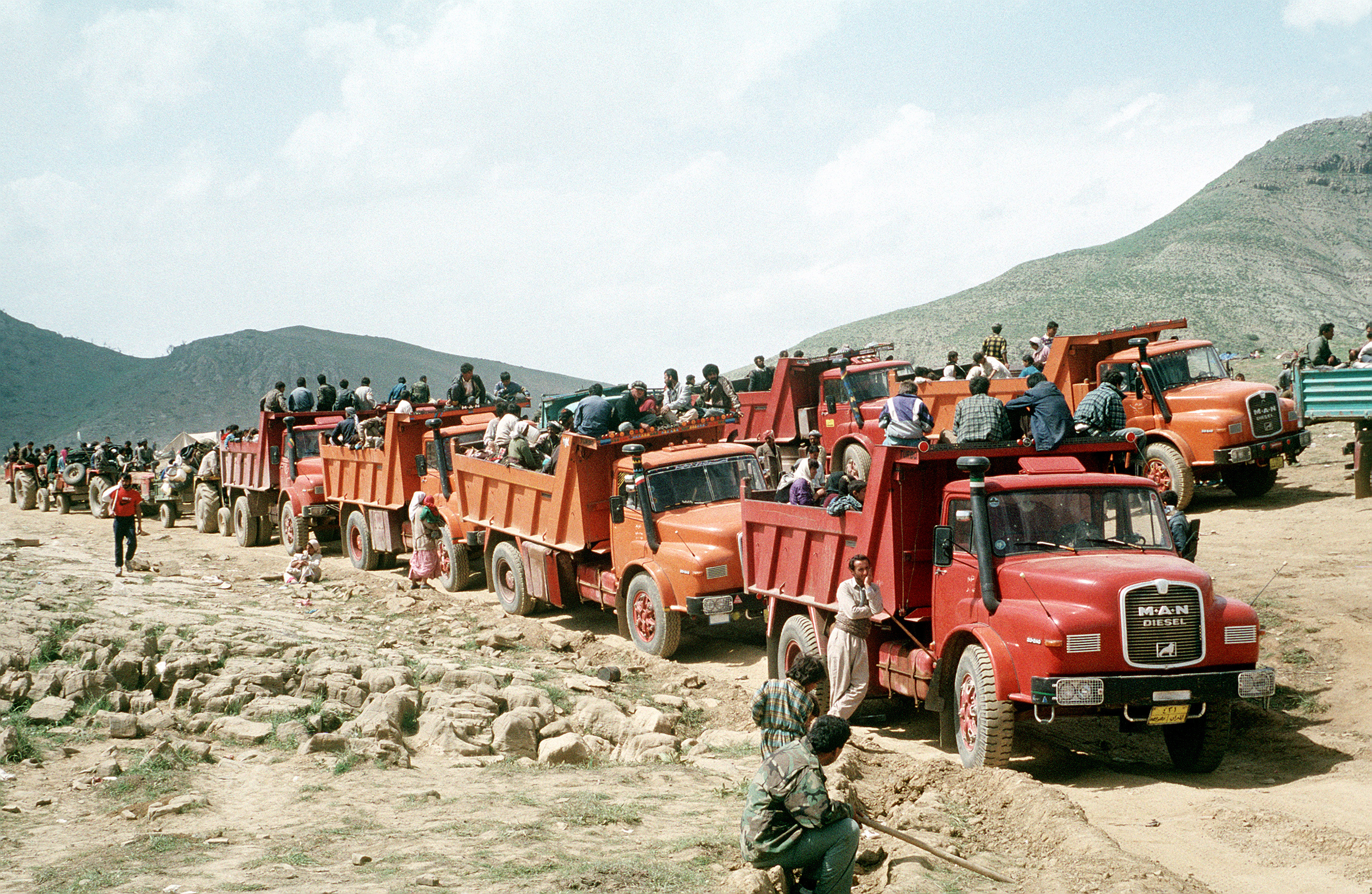
Iraqi Kurds fleeing to Turkey in April 1991, during the Gulf War

During the Iran–Iraq War, the Iraqi government again implemented anti-Kurdish policies and a de facto civil war broke out. Iraq was widely condemned by the international community, but was never seriously punished for oppressive measures, including the use of chemical weapons against the Kurds, which resulted in thousands of deaths. The Anfal campaign constituted a systematic genocide of the Kurdish people in Iraq.

The second and more extensive and widespread wave began from March 29, 1987, until April 23, 1989, when the Iraqi army under the command of Saddam Hussein & Ali Hassan al-Majid carried out a genocidal campaign against the Kurds, characterized by the following human rights violations: The widespread use of chemical weapons, the wholesale destruction of some 2,000 villages, and slaughter of around 50,000 rural Kurds, by the most conservative estimates. The large Kurdish town of Qala Dizeh (population 70,000) was completely destroyed by the Iraqi army. The campaign also included Arabization of Kirkuk, a program to drive Kurds and other ethnic groups out of the oil-rich city and replace them with Arab settlers from central and southern Iraq.

=== Autonomous period ===
==== After the Persian Gulf War ====
Even though autonomy had been agreed in 1970, the local population did not enjoy any democratic freedom, facing similar conditions to the rest of Iraq. Things began to change after the 1991 uprising against Saddam Hussein at the end of the Persian Gulf War. The United Nations Security Council Resolution 688 gave birth to a safe haven following international concern for the safety of Kurdish refugees. The U.S. and the Coalition established a No Fly Zone over a large part of northern Iraq (see Operation Provide Comfort); however, it left out Sulaymaniyah, Kirkuk and other important Kurdish populated regions. Bloody clashes between Iraqi forces and Kurdish troops continued and, after an uneasy and shaky balance of power was reached, the Iraqi government fully withdrew its military and other personnel from the region in October 1991 allowing Iraqi Kurdistan to function de facto independently. The region was to be ruled by the two principal Kurdish parties; the Kurdish Democratic Party (KDP) and the Patriotic Union of Kurdistan (PUK). The region also has its own flag and national anthem.

At the same time, Iraq imposed an economic blockade over the region, reducing its oil and food supplies. Elections held in June 1992 produced an inconclusive outcome, with the assembly divided almost equally between the two main parties and their allies. During this period, the Kurds were subjected to a double embargo: one imposed by the United Nations on Iraq and one imposed by Saddam Hussein on their region. The severe economic hardships caused by the embargoes fueled tensions between the two dominant political parties, the KDP and the PUK, over control of trade routes and resources. Relations between the PUK and the KDP started to become dangerously strained from September 1993 after rounds of amalgamations occurred between parties.

After 1996, 13% of the Iraqi oil sales were allocated for Iraqi Kurdistan and this led to relative prosperity in the region. In return, the Kurds under KDP enabled Saddam to establish an oil smuggling route through territory controlled by the KDP, with the active involvement of senior Barzani family members. The taxation of this trade at the crossing point between Saddam's territory and Kurdish controlled territory and then into Turkey, along with associated service revenue, meant that whoever controlled Dohuk and Zakho had the potential to earn several million dollars a week. Direct United States mediation led the two parties to a formal ceasefire in what was termed the Washington Agreement in September 1998. It is also argued that the Oil-for-Food Programme from 1997 onward had an important effect on cessation of hostilities.

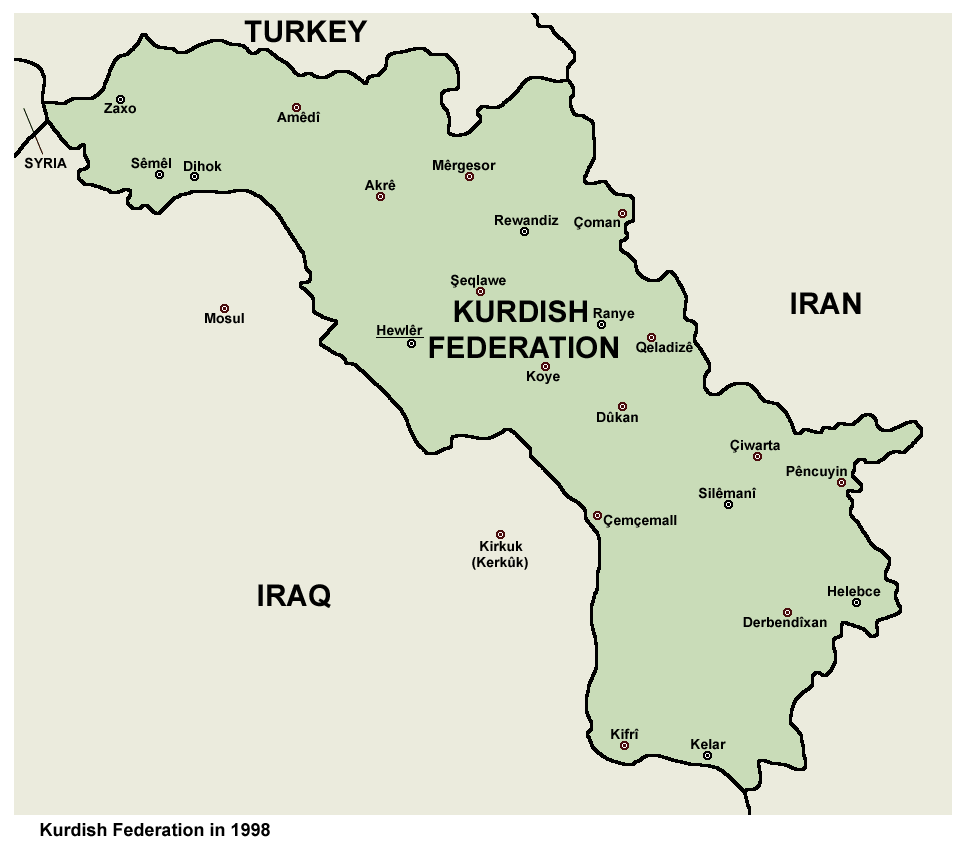
Kurdish Federation in 1998

==== During and after US-led invasion ====
Iraqi Kurds played an important role in the Iraq War. Kurdish parties joined forces against the Iraqi government during the war in Spring 2003. Kurdish military forces, known as Peshmerga, played an important role in the overthrow of the Iraqi government; however, Kurds have been reluctant to send troops into Baghdad since then, preferring not to be dragged into the sectarian struggle that dominates much of Iraq.

A new constitution of Iraq was established in 2005, defining Iraq as a federalist state consisting of Regions and Governorate's. The Kurdistan region includes the Governorate Erbil, Sulaymaniyah and Duhok. It recognized both the Kurdistan Region and all laws passed by the KRG since 1992. There is provision for Governorates to create, join or leave Regions. However, as of late 2015, no new Regions have been formed, and the KRG remains the only regional government within Iraq.

PUK leader Jalal Talabani was elected President of the new Iraqi administration, while KDP leader Masoud Barzani became President of the Kurdistan Regional Government.

==== Following US withdrawal ====
Disputed areas in Iraq prior to the 2014 Northern Iraq offensive Disputed and part of the Kurdish Regional Government since 1991. Disputed and under the control of central government.

Tensions between Iraqi Kurdistan and the central Iraqi government mounted through 2011–2012 on the issues of power sharing, oil production and territorial control. In April 2012, the president of Iraq's semi-autonomous northern Kurdish region demanded that officials agree to their demands or face the prospect of secession from Baghdad by September 2012.

In September 2012, the Iraqi government ordered the KRG to transfer its powers over the Peshmerga to the central government. Relations became further strained by the formation of a new command center (Tigris Operation Command) for Iraqi forces to operate in a disputed area over which both Baghdad and the Kurdistan Regional Government claim jurisdiction. On 16 November 2012 a military clash between the Iraqi forces and the Peshmerga resulted in one person killed. CNN reported that two people were killed (one of them an Iraqi soldier) and ten wounded in clashes at the Tuz Khurmato town.

As of 2014, Iraqi Kurdistan is in dispute with the Federal Iraqi government on the issues of territorial control, export of oil and budget distribution and is functioning largely outside Baghdad's control. With the escalation of the Iraqi crisis and fears of Iraq's collapse, Kurds have increasingly debated the issue of independence. During the 2014 Northern Iraq offensive, Iraqi Kurdistan seized the city of Kirkuk and the surrounding area, as well as most of the disputed territories in Northern Iraq. On 1 July 2014, Masoud Barzani announced that "Iraq's Kurds will hold an independence referendum within months." After previously opposing the independence for Iraqi Kurdistan, Turkey later gave signs that it could recognize an independent Kurdish state. On 11 July 2014, KRG forces seized control of the Bai Hassan and Kirkuk oilfields, prompting a condemnation from Baghdad and a threat of "dire consequences" if the oilfields were not relinquished back to Iraq's control.

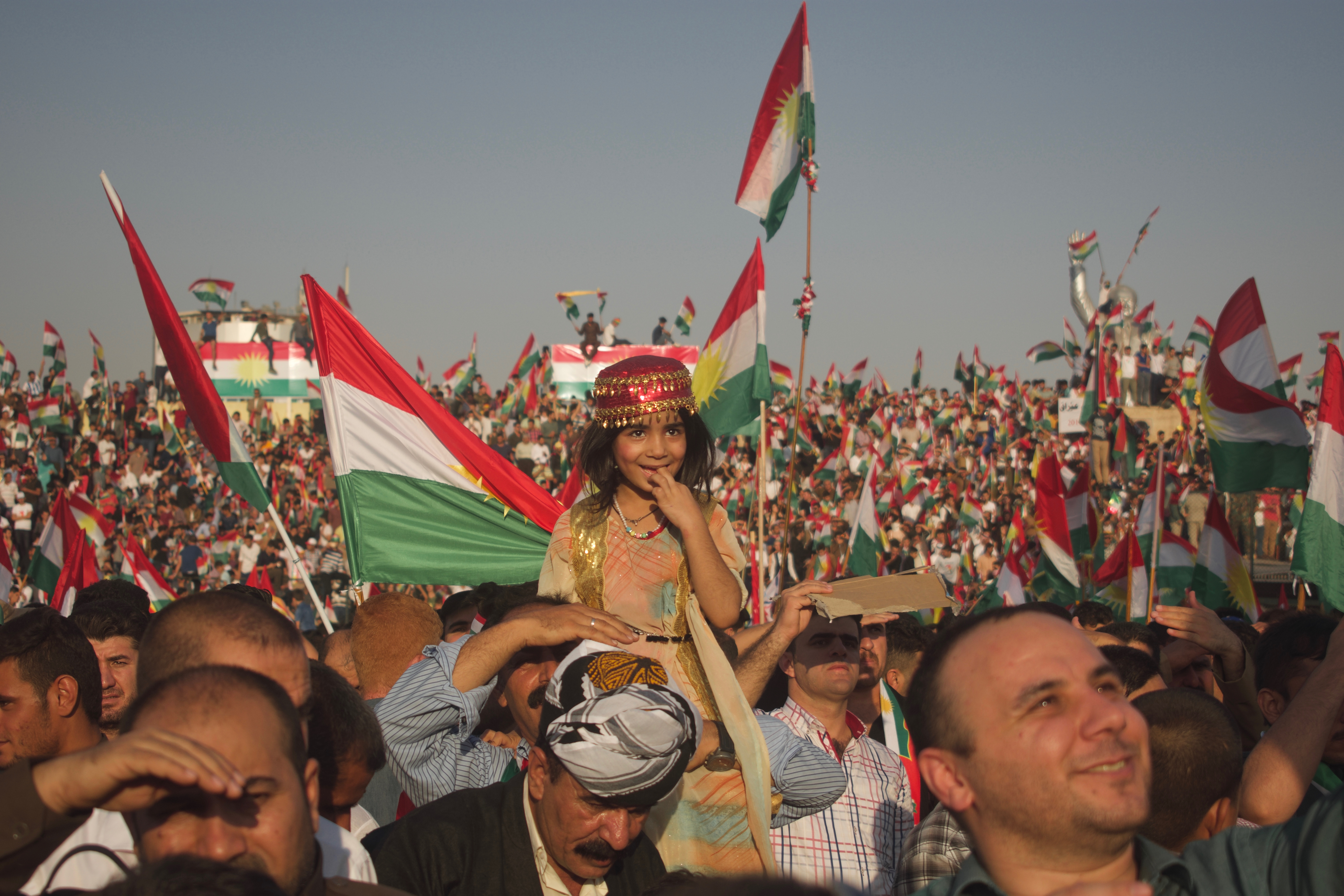
Pro-independence rally in Erbil in September 2017

In September 2014, Kurdish leaders decided to postpone the referendum so as to focus on the fight against ISIL. In November, Ed Royce, Chairman of the Foreign Affairs Committee of the United States House of Representatives, introduced legislation to arm the Kurds directly, rather than continue working through the local governments.

In August 2014, the US began a campaign of airstrikes in Iraq, in part to protect Kurdish areas such as Erbil from the militants.

In February 2016, Kurdish president Barzani stated once again that "Now the time is ripe for the people of Kurdistan to decide their future through a referendum", supporting an independence referendum and citing similar referendums in Scotland, Catalonia and Quebec. On March 23, Barzani officially declared that Iraqi Kurdistan will hold the referendum some time "before October" of that year. On April 2, 2017, the two governing parties released a joint statement announcing they would form a joint committee to prepare for a referendum to be held on 25 September.

The 2017 Kurdistan Region independence referendum took place on September 25, with 92.73% voting in favor of independence. This triggered a military operation in which the Iraqi government retook control of Kirkuk and surrounding areas, and forced the KRG to annul the referendum. Scholars have argued that the retaking of Kirkuk, a PUK stronghold, and the loss of other territory to Iraq, has actually consolidated the power of the Barzani family and the KDP, who remain in power. Following Kurdistan Region's failed attempt to achieve independence after its referendum in 2017, the government of Iraq has exacted severe punishment against KRI in a number of punitive measures; ultimately striving to remove its autonomy. Some Kurdish officials in Iraq have described this as evidence of the Iraqi government's aim to return to a centralised political system and abandon the federal system it adopted in 2005. In September 2023, the prime minister of KRG, Masrour Barzani sent a letter to the president of the United States, imploring him to intervene, and warning of a potential collapse of Kurdistan Region and the "federal model" in Iraq.

== Geography ==
Iraqi Kurdistan is largely mountainous, with the highest point being a 3,611 m (11,847 ft) point known locally as Cheekha Dar ("black tent"). Mountains in Iraqi Kurdistan include the Zagros, Halgurd Mountain, Sinjar Mountains, Hamrin Mountains, Mount Nisir, and Qandil mountains. There are many rivers running through the region, which is distinguished by its fertile lands, plentiful water, and picturesque nature. The Great Zab and the Little Zab flow east–west in the region. The Tigris river enters Iraqi Kurdistan from Turkish Kurdistan.

The mountainous nature of Iraqi Kurdistan, the difference of temperatures in its various parts, and its numerous bodies of water make it a land of agriculture and tourism. The largest lake in the region is Lake Dukan. There are also several smaller lakes, such as Darbandikhan Lake and Duhok Lake. The western and southern parts of Iraqi Kurdistan are not as mountainous as the east. Instead, it is rolling hills and steppe land.

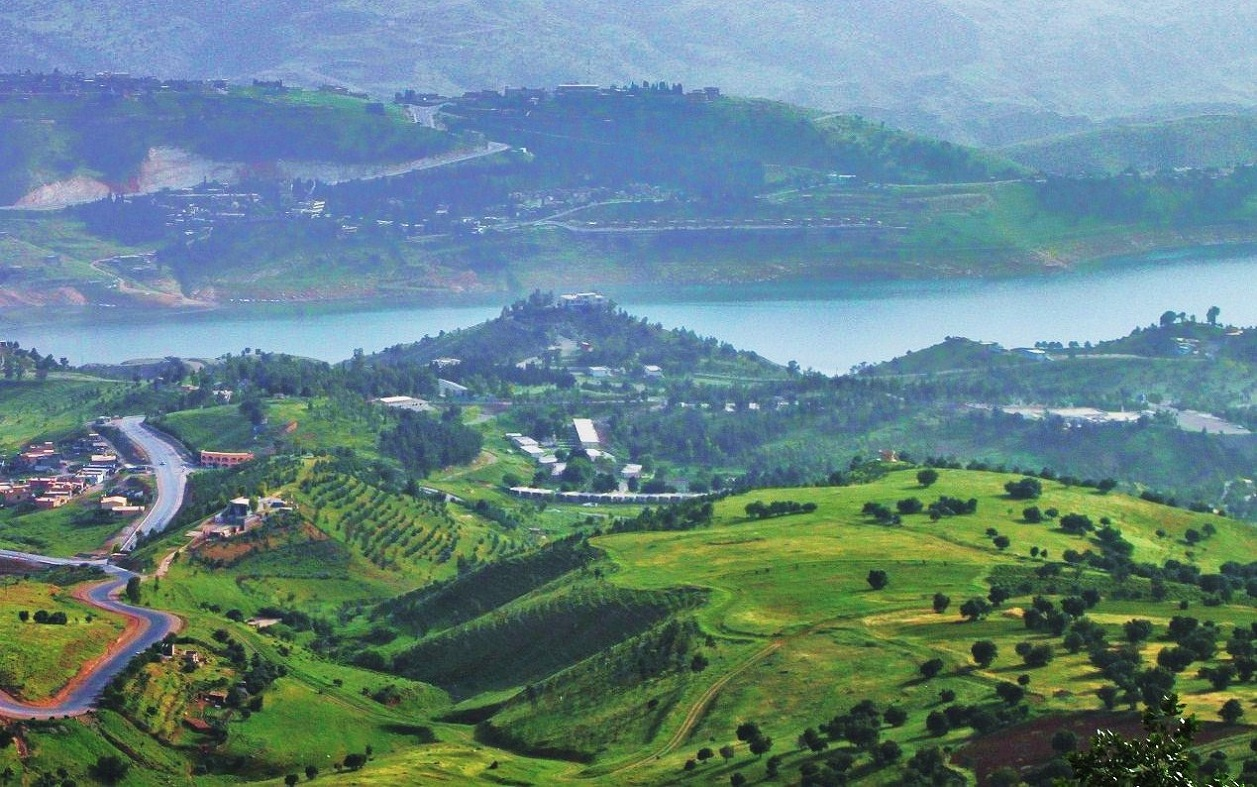
Lake Dukan

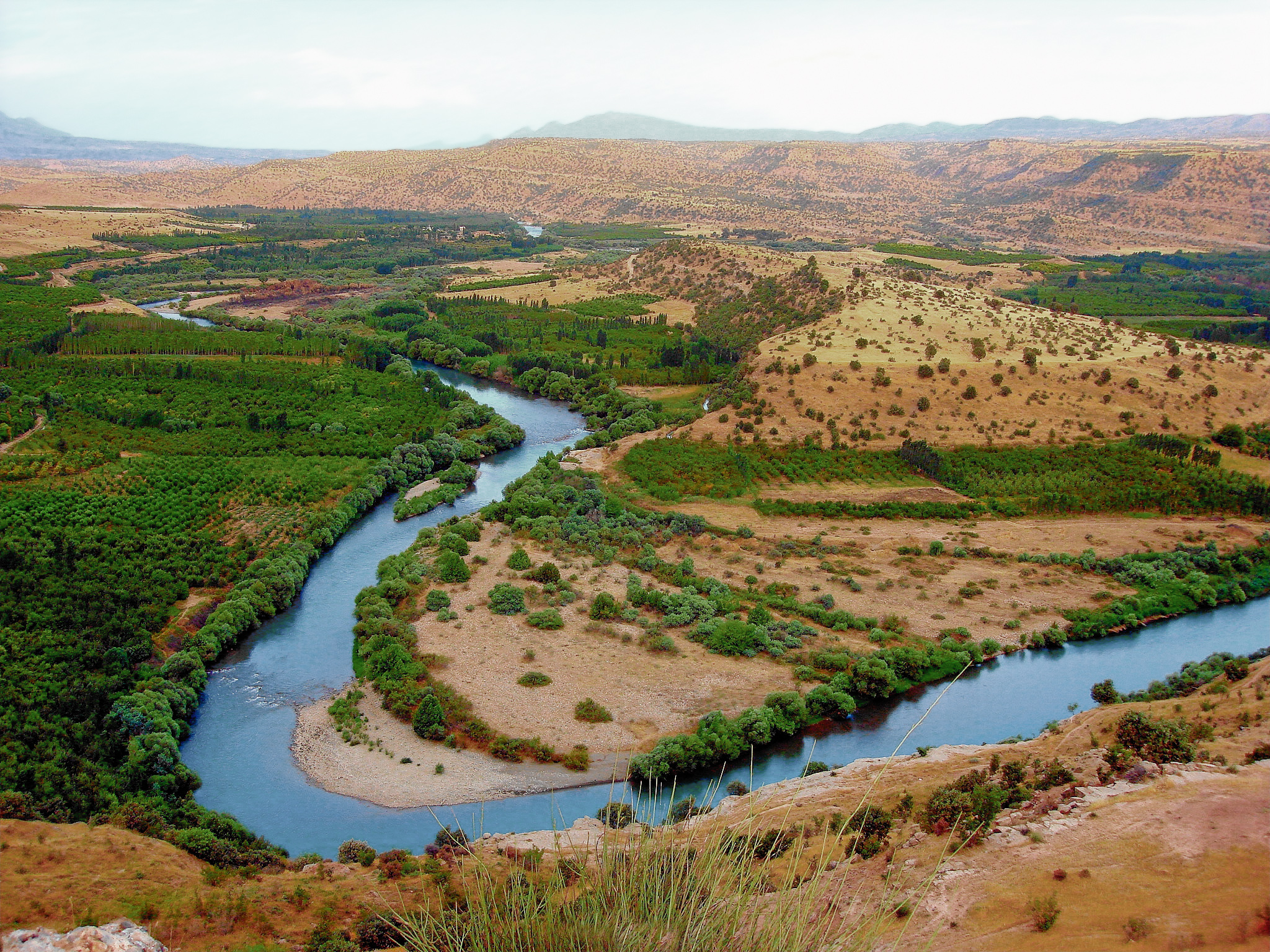
Greater Zab River near Erbil

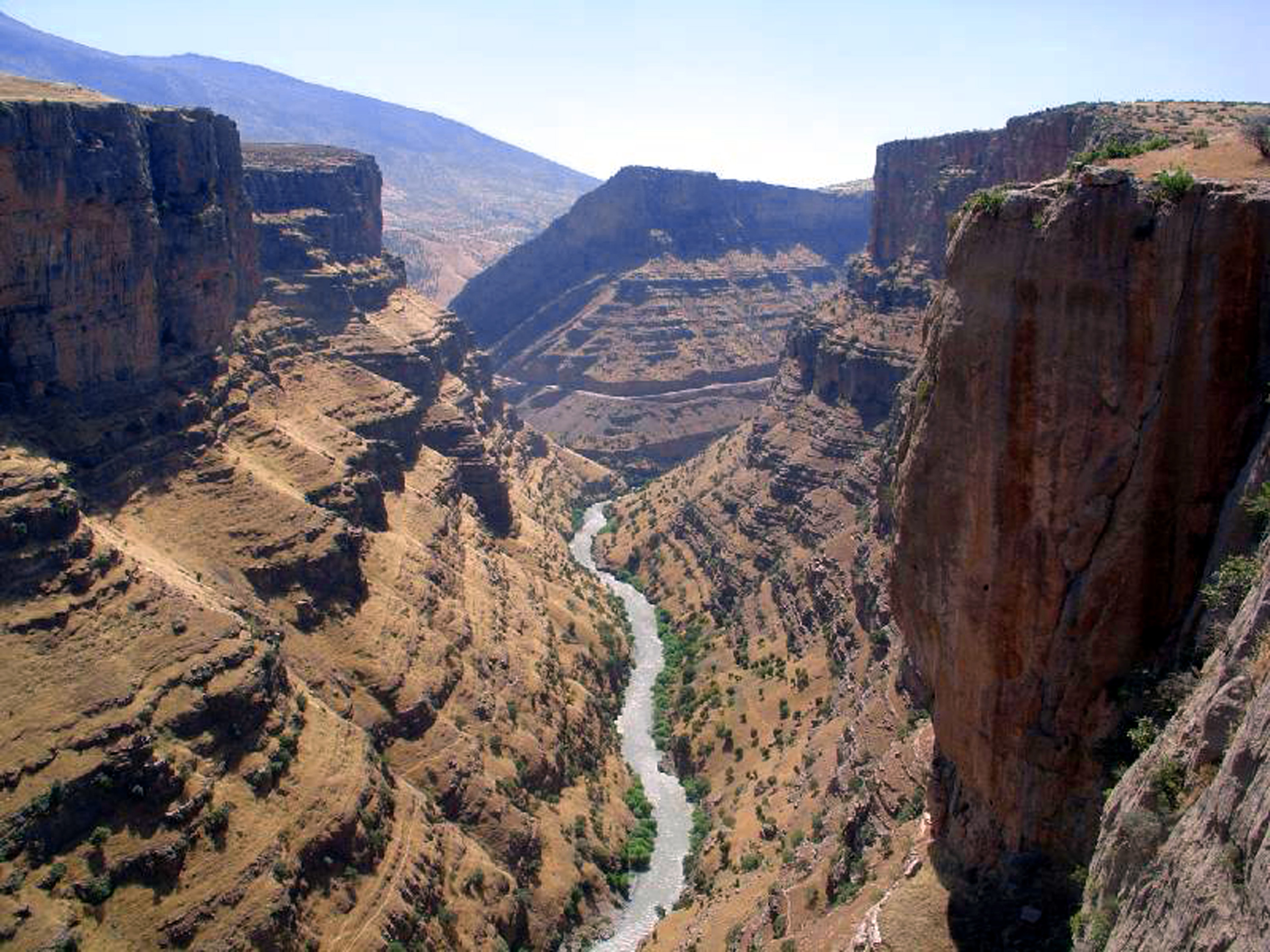
A canyon near the northern city of Rawandiz

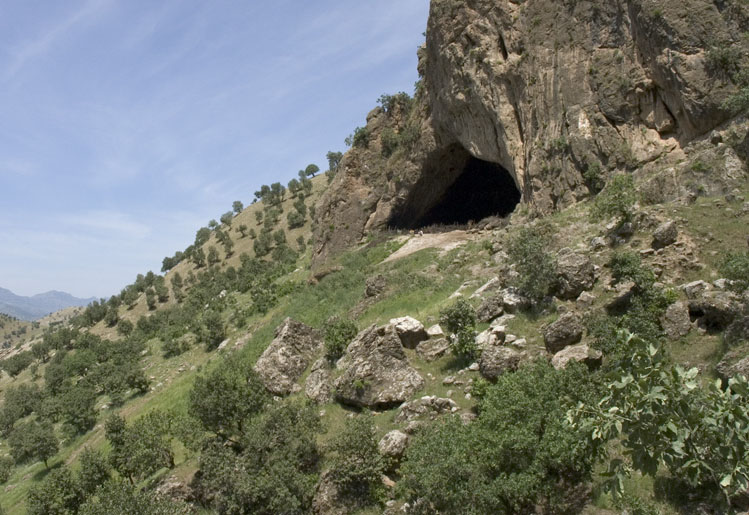
Shanidar Cave, surrounded by Mediterranean vegetation

=== Climate ===
Due to its latitude and altitude, Iraqi Kurdistan is cooler and much wetter than the rest of Iraq. Most areas in the region fall within the Mediterranean climate zone (Csa), with areas to the southwest being semi-arid (BSh).

Average summer temperatures range from 35 °C (95 °F) in the cooler northernmost areas to blistering 40 °C (104 °F) in the southwest, with lows around 21 °C (70 °F) to 24 °C (75 °F). Winters, however, are dramatically cooler than the rest of Iraq, with highs averaging between 9 °C (48 °F) and 11 °C (52 °F) and with lows hovering around 3 °C (37 °F) in some areas and freezing in others.

Among other cities in the climate table below, Soran, Shaqlawa, and Halabja also experience lows which average below 0 °C (32 °F) in winter. Duhok has the hottest summers in the region, with highs averaging around 42 °C (108 °F). Annual rainfall differs across Iraqi Kurdistan, with some places seeing rainfall as low as 500 millimetres (20 in) in Erbil to as high as 900 millimetres (35 in) in places like Amadiya. Most of the rain falls in winter and spring, and is usually heavy. Summer and early autumn are virtually dry, and spring is fairly tepid. Iraqi Kurdistan sees snowfall occasionally in the winter, and frost is common. There is a seasonal lag in some places in summer, with temperatures peaking around August and September.

Climate data for Erbil
Month	Jan	Feb	Mar	Apr	May	Jun	Jul	Aug	Sep	Oct	Nov	Dec	Year
Record high °C (°F)	20 (68)	27 (81)	30 (86)	34 (93)	42 (108)	44 (111)	48 (118)	49 (120)	45 (113)	39 (102)	31 (88)	24 (75)	49 (120)
Mean daily maximum °C (°F)	12.4 (54.3)	14.2 (57.6)	18.1 (64.6)	24.0 (75.2)	31.5 (88.7)	38.1 (100.6)	42.0 (107.6)	41.9 (107.4)	37.9 (100.2)	30.7 (87.3)	21.2 (70.2)	14.4 (57.9)	27.2 (81.0)
Daily mean °C (°F)	7.4 (45.3)	8.9 (48.0)	12.4 (54.3)	17.5 (63.5)	24.1 (75.4)	29.7 (85.5)	33.4 (92.1)	33.1 (91.6)	29.0 (84.2)	22.6 (72.7)	15.0 (59.0)	9.1 (48.4)	20.2 (68.3)
Mean daily minimum °C (°F)	2.4 (36.3)	3.6 (38.5)	6.7 (44.1)	11.1 (52.0)	16.7 (62.1)	21.4 (70.5)	24.9 (76.8)	24.4 (75.9)	20.1 (68.2)	14.5 (58.1)	8.9 (48.0)	3.9 (39.0)	13.2 (55.8)
Record low °C (°F)	−4 (25)	−6 (21)	−1 (30)	3 (37)	6 (43)	10 (50)	13 (55)	17 (63)	11 (52)	4 (39)	−2 (28)	−2 (28)	−6 (21)
Average rainfall mm (inches)	111 (4.4)	97 (3.8)	89 (3.5)	69 (2.7)	26 (1.0)	0 (0)	0 (0)	0 (0)	0 (0)	12 (0.5)	56 (2.2)	80 (3.1)	540 (21.2)
Average rainy days	9	9	10	9	4	1	0	0	1	3	6	10	62
Average snowy days	1	0	0	0	0	0	0	0	0	0	0	0	1
Average relative humidity (%)	74.5	70	65	58.5	41.5	28.5	25	27.5	30.5	43.5	60.5	75.5	50.0
Source 1: Climate-Data.org, My Forecast for records, humidity, snow and precipitation days
Source 2: What's the Weather Like.org, Erbilia

Climate data for Amadiya
Month	Jan	Feb	Mar	Apr	May	Jun	Jul	Aug	Sep	Oct	Nov	Dec	Year
Mean daily maximum °C (°F)	6.2 (43.2)	7.8 (46.0)	12.1 (53.8)	17.8 (64.0)	25.1 (77.2)	31.9 (89.4)	36.3 (97.3)	36.2 (97.2)	32.2 (90.0)	24.4 (75.9)	15.4 (59.7)	8.4 (47.1)	21.2 (70.1)
Mean daily minimum °C (°F)	−2.4 (27.7)	−1.3 (29.7)	2.4 (36.3)	7.2 (45.0)	12.5 (54.5)	17.4 (63.3)	21.4 (70.5)	20.9 (69.6)	16.8 (62.2)	10.9 (51.6)	5.0 (41.0)	0.0 (32.0)	9.2 (48.6)
Average precipitation mm (inches)	126 (5.0)	176 (6.9)	156 (6.1)	128 (5.0)	56 (2.2)	0 (0)	0 (0)	0 (0)	1 (0.0)	32 (1.3)	96 (3.8)	126 (5.0)	897 (35.3)
Average precipitation days	7	6	10	8	4	0	0	0	1	7	7	10	60
Source 1: World Weather Online (precipitation days)
Source 2: Climate-Data (temperatures and rainfall amount)

== Economy ==
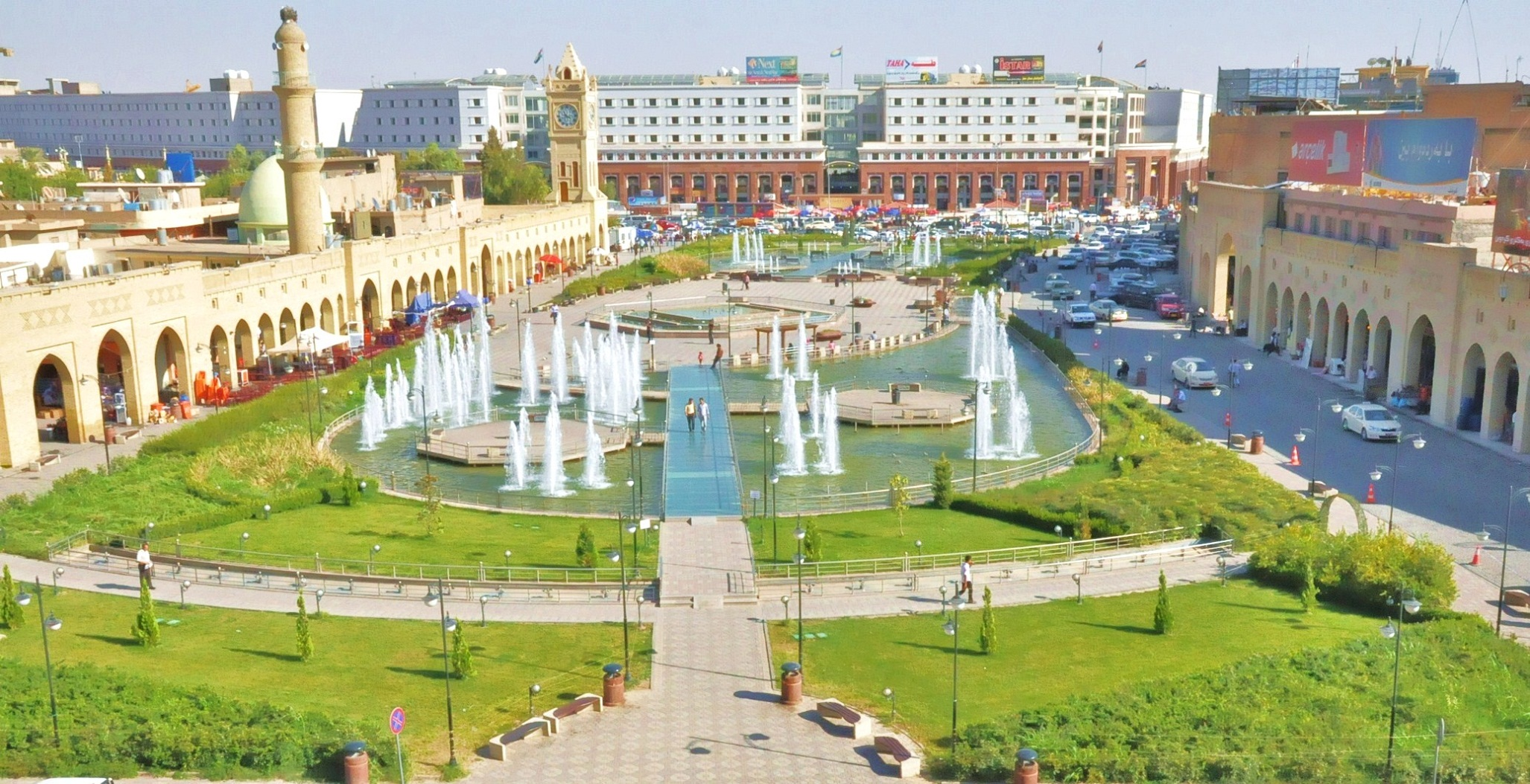
Erbil, capital of Kurdistan Region

The provinces of Duhok, Erbil, and Sulaymanyah are rich in agricultural lands. Wheat and other cereals are grown there. Most of the areas are rainfed, but there are also some smaller irrigation systems in place. Tourism is another branch which draws the attention of the KRI, which achieved the declaration of Erbil as the Tourism Capital by the Arab Council of Tourism in 2014.

== Culture ==
Kurdish culture is a group of distinctive cultural traits practiced by Kurdish people. The Kurdish culture is a legacy from the various ancient peoples who shaped modern Kurds and their society, but primarily Iranian. Among their neighbours, the Kurdish culture is closest to Persian culture. For example, they celebrate Newroz as the new year day, which is celebrated on March 21. It is the first day of the month of Xakelêwe in Kurdish calendar and the first day of spring.
