= Cheekha Dar =

Mountain on Iraq and Iran border

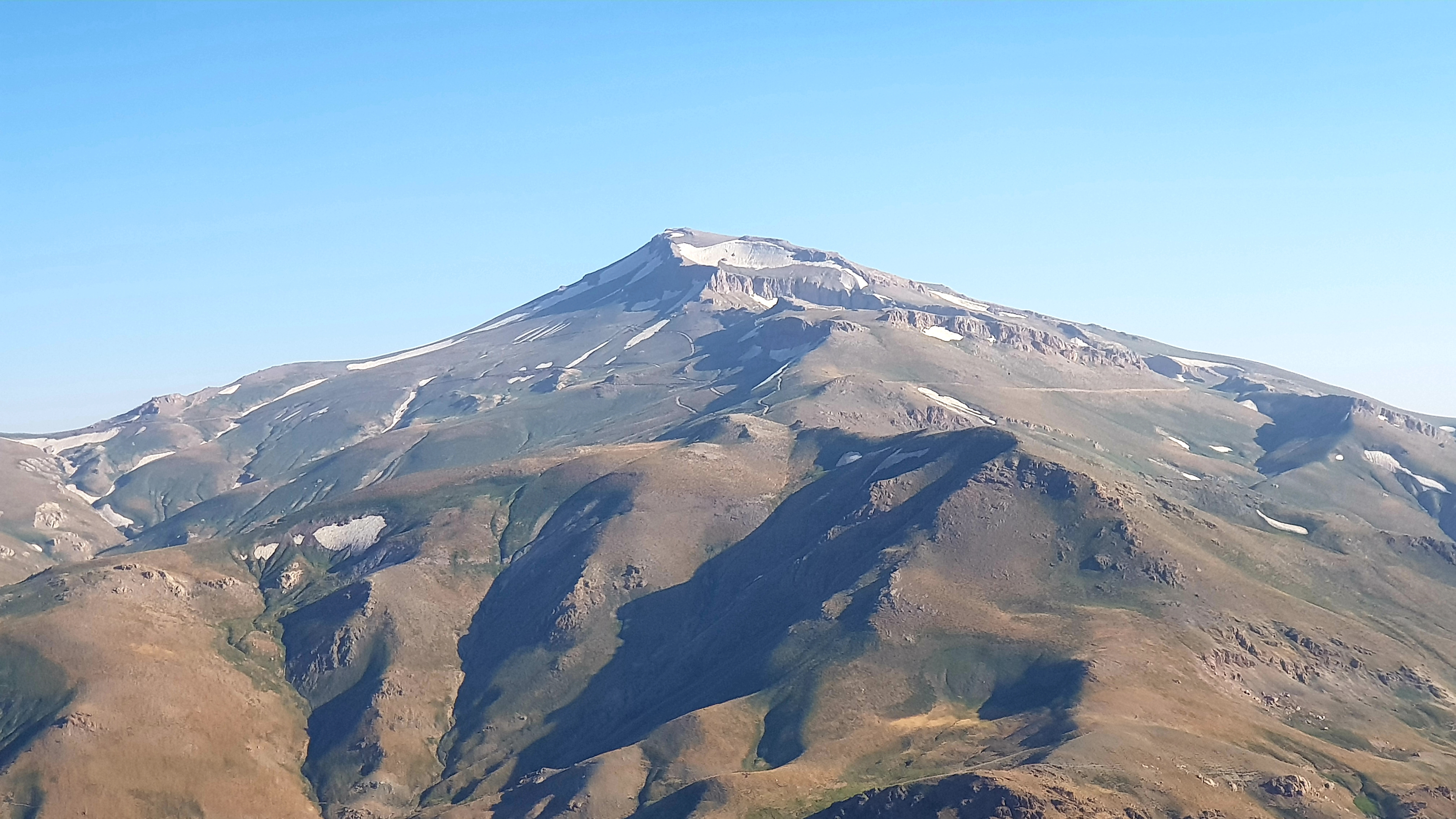

Highest point
- Elevation: 3,611 m (11,847 ft)
- Prominence: 1,575 m (5,167 ft)
- Listing: Country high point Ultra
- Coordinates: 36°46′36″N 44°55′07″E

Geography
- Location within Iraq
- Location: Iran–Iraq border
- Parent range: Zagros Mountains

Cheekha Dar (Kurdish: Çîxî Derê, Sorani Kurdish: چیخی دەرێ), which means Black Tent, is the local Kurdish name for the mountain, located in Kurdistan Region of Iraq, currently thought to be the highest in Iraq. It is claimed to be 3,611 m (11,847 ft) high in the CIA World Factbook. It is 6 km (3.7 mi) north of the village of Gundah Zhur and is on the border with Iran.

== History ==
It was climbed in November 2004 by English explorer Ginge Fullen, who recorded a GPS reading of 3,628 meters at the coordinates in the adjacent table. The location is consistent with SRTM and Russian topographic mapping, although these sources are more consistent with the CIA height.

The first reported winter ascent was by Jonathan Beswick and Matthew DuPuy on March 18, 2011. The expedition GPS confirmed 3,611 m (11,847 ft). There is a danger of land mines in the area on approach between Hamilton Road and the village of Gundah Zhur. Some fields are marked by red, triangular signs with skull and crossbones. It is possible to find Kurdish military escorts through this area in the town of Choman.

A nearby peak called Halgurd is around 3,607 m (11,834 ft) high, and was previously thought to be Iraq's highest mountain.

== See also ==
- Iraqi Kurdistan
- List of elevation extremes by country
