= Halgurd =

Mountain in Kurdistan Region, Iraq

Halgurd هەڵگورد
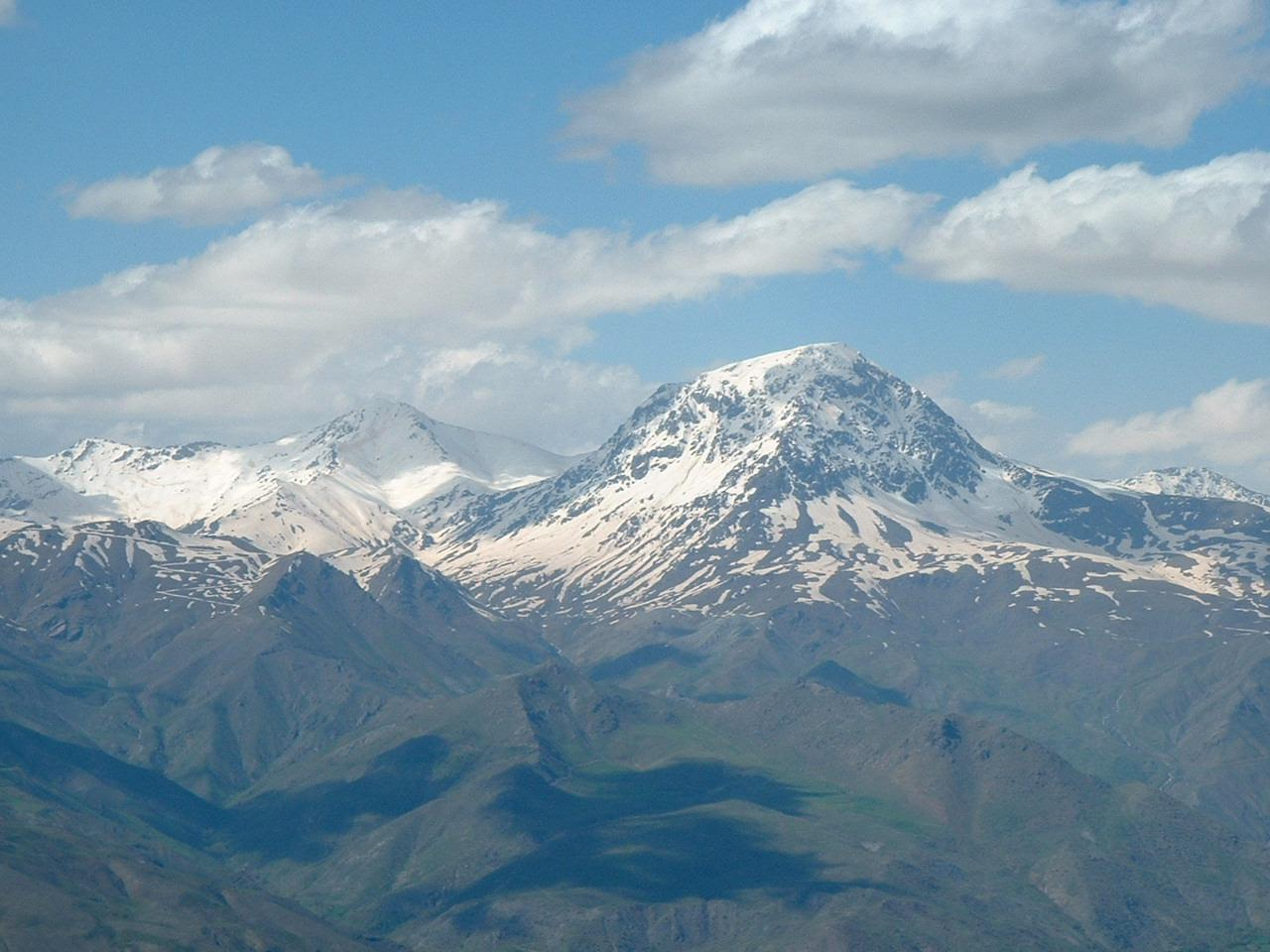
- Peak

Highest point
- Elevation: 3,607 m (11,834 ft)
- Prominence: 1575 m
- Coordinates: 36°44′3″N 44°51′45″E

Geography
- Location within Iraq
- Location: Choman District, Erbil, Kurdistan Region, Iraq
- Country: Iraq
- Region: Kurdistan
- Parent range: Zagros Mountains

Halgurd (Kurdish: Hêlgûrd ,هەڵگورد) is the second highest mountain in Iraq, after Cheekha Dar, and the tallest fully within Iraq. Located in Choman district in Northern Erbil Province, Kurdistan Region, Iraq, Halgurd has an elevation of 3,607 metres.

== Geography ==
Halgurd is a mountain in the Zagros Mountains near the Iranian border and forms part of the Hasarost Mountain Range (also spelled Hasār-i Rōst). At approximately 3,613 m (11,854 ft), it is widely regarded as Iraq's highest peak, although the nearby Cheekha Dar is also considered a contender. The mountain retains snow throughout much of the summer, while its slopes are used for seasonal grazing and the surrounding villages support vegetable cultivation and livestock farming despite the presence of landmines in parts of the area. Halgurd is surrounded by some high mountain lakes, including Bêrme Sard and Bêrmî Garm. The valley below Halgurd peak and above Nawanda village serves as the summer pasture for nomadic Kurdish pastoralists (rewend).
