= Bekhal Waterfall =

Waterfall In The Kurdistan Region, Iraq

Coordinates: 36.617662°N 44.494715°E

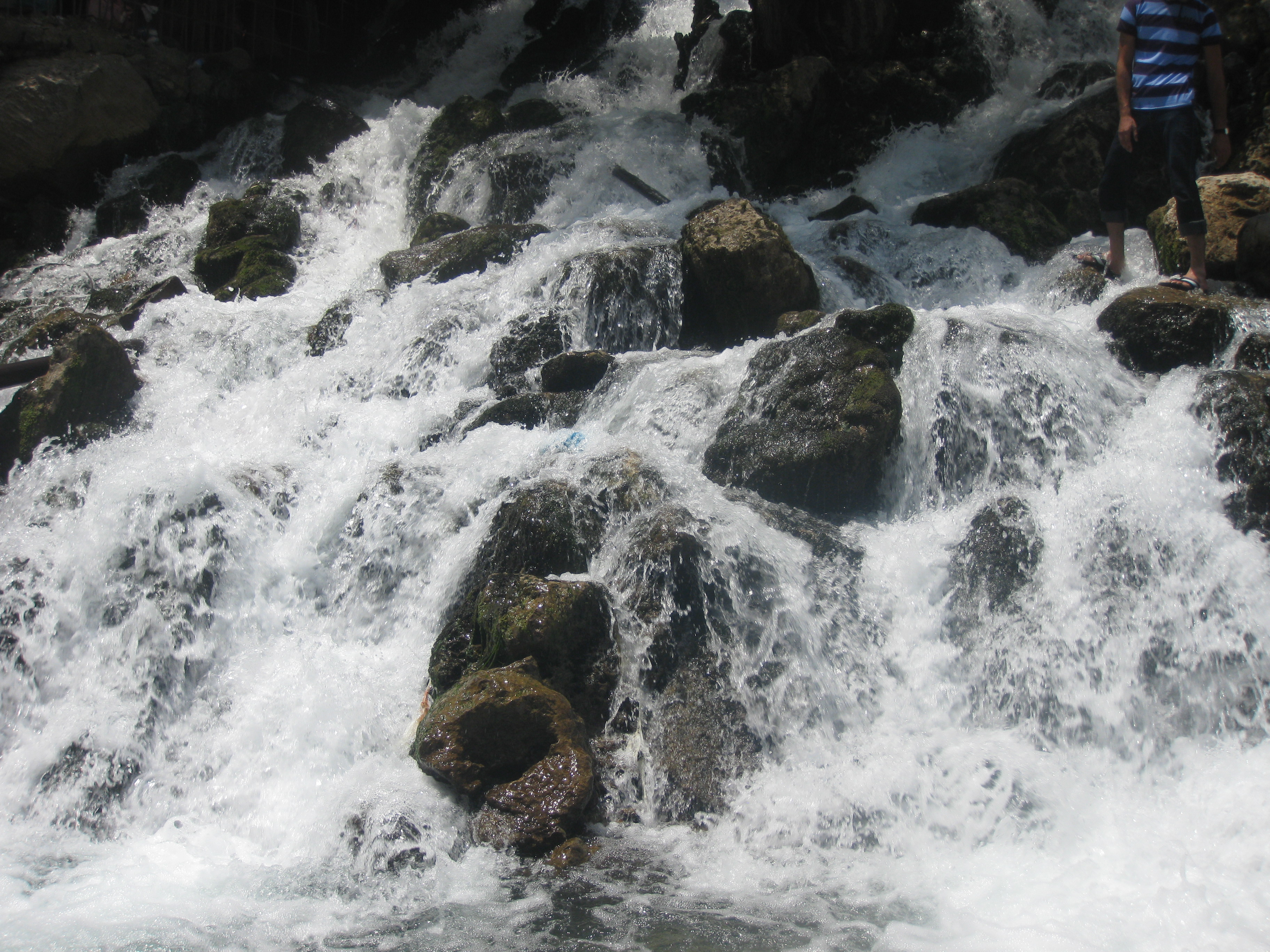
- Bekhal Waterfall
- Interactive map of Bekhal Waterfall
- Location: Erbil Governorate, Kurdistan Region, Iraq

Bekhal Waterfall (Kurdish: تاڤگەی بێخاڵ) is located in the mountainous northern part of the country in the Kurdistan Region, in Erbil Governorate. It is located 10 km west of Rawandiz and 135 km from Erbil. This waterfall hosts many visitors and tourists across the country.
