= Rawandiz =

- City
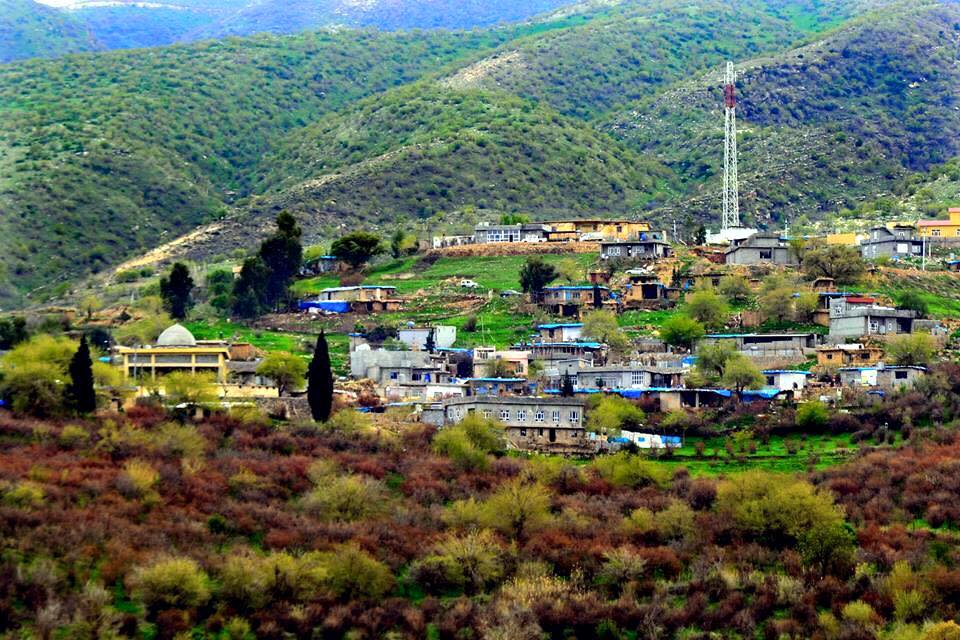
- View of Rawandiz

- Location in Iraq
- Coordinates: 36°36′43″N 44°31′29″E
- Country: Iraq
- Autonomous region: Kurdistan Region
- Governorate: Erbil Governorate
- District: Rawandiz District
- Elevation: 658 m (2,159 ft)

Population (2003)
  - Total: 95,089
- Time zone: UTC+3

Rawandiz (Kurdish: ڕەواندز, romanized: Rewandiz) is a city in the Kurdistan Region of Iraq, located in the Erbil Governorate in Soran district, close to the borders with Iran and Turkey. It is only 7 km from the city center of Soran city and it is located 10 km to the east of the Bekhal Waterfall. The city is 123 km from Erbil. The city along with the Soran district is surrounded by the Zagros mountain range; Korek Mountain is to the south, Hindren Mountain to the north, Zozik Mountain to the west, and Bradasot Mountain to the east. Rawandiz is populated entirely by Kurds.

== Etymology ==
The name Rawandiz (lit. 'fortress of the Rawand'), gets its name from Kurdish noble family Rawwadi/Rawandi, they were a leading family of Hadhbāni Kurdish tribe.

== History ==
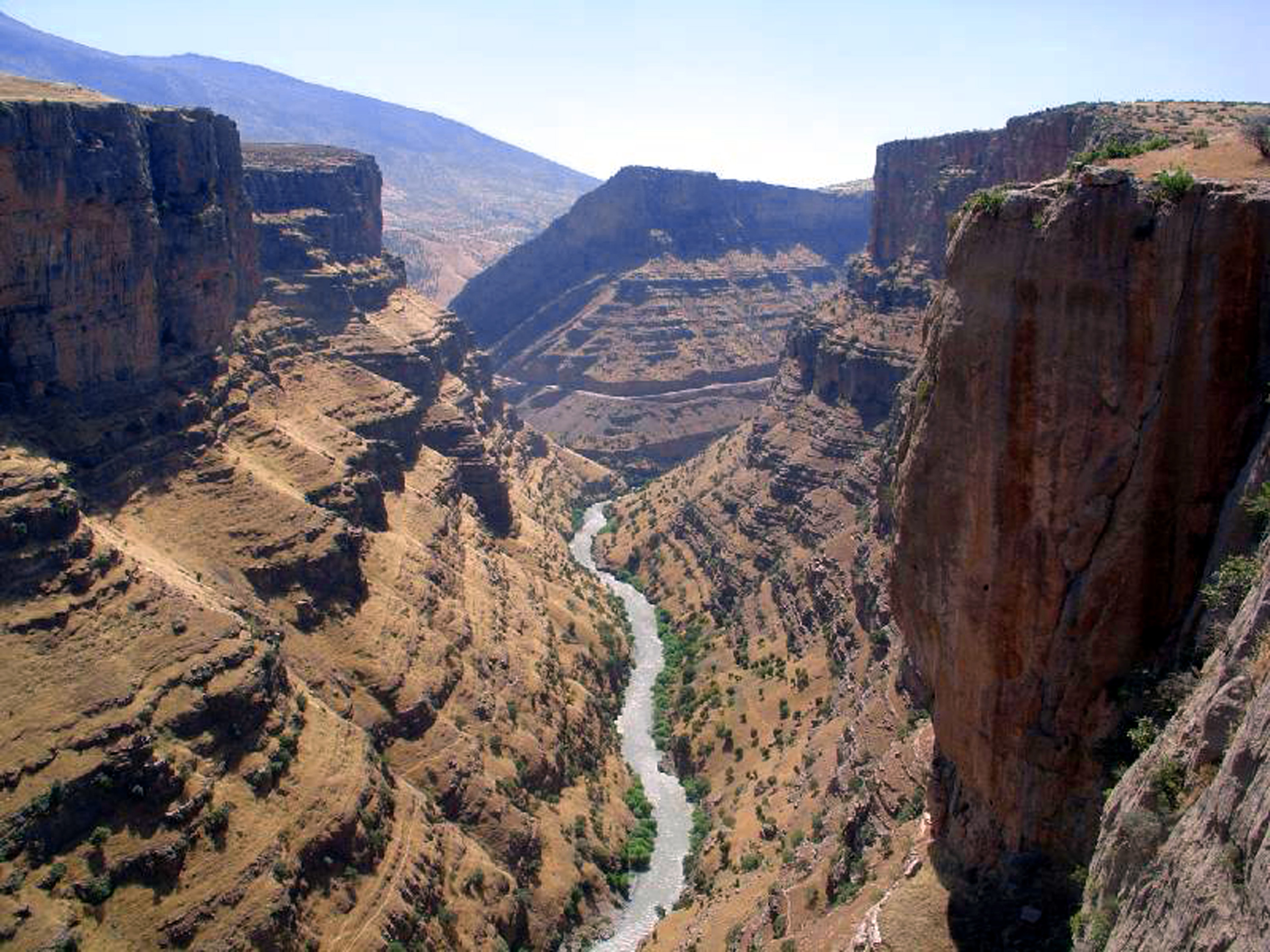
Canyon of Rawandiz Valley

In the time of the Neo Assyrian Empire, from the 10th to the 7th centuries BC, the area lay on the trading route to Nineveh.

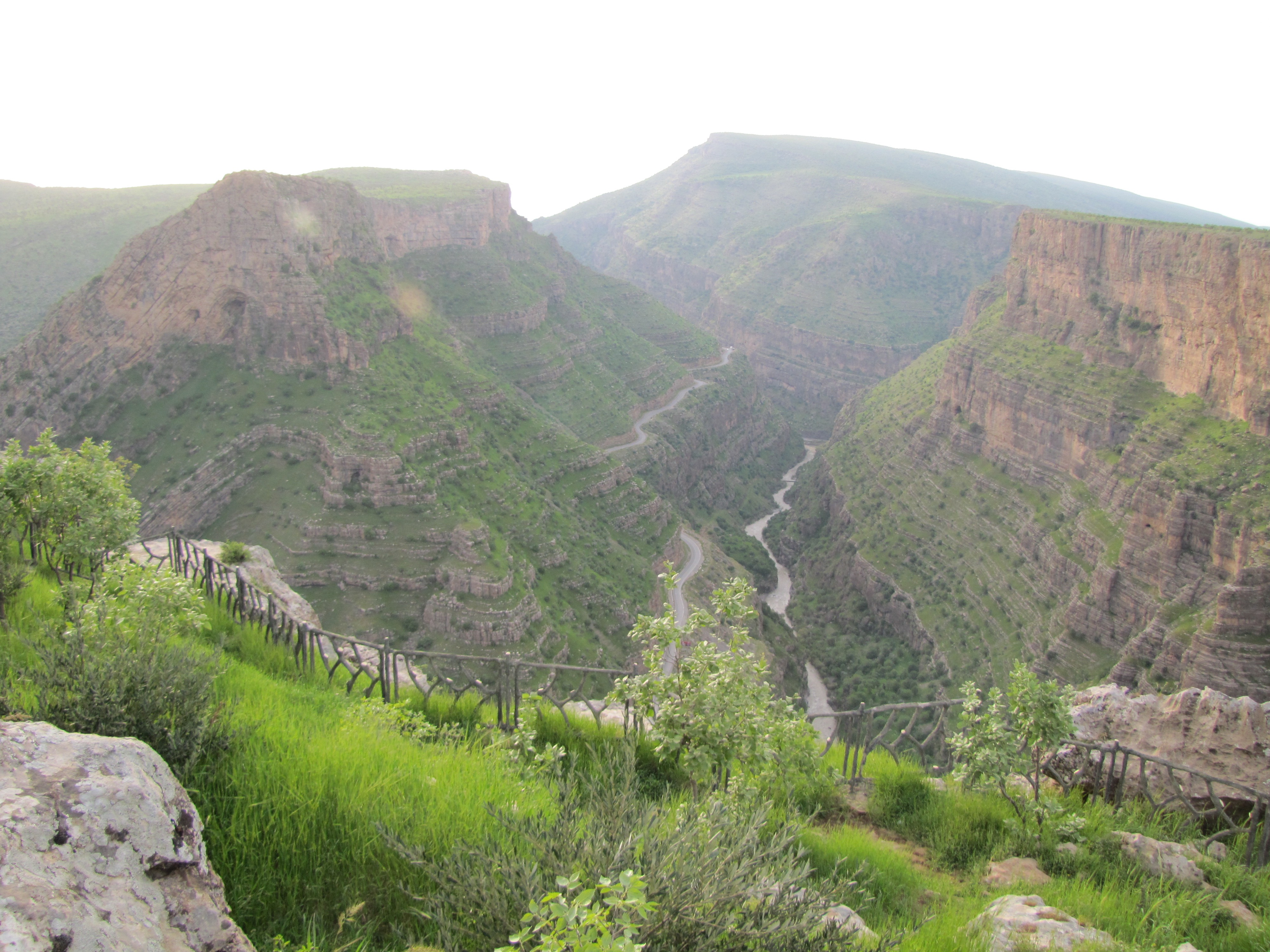
Rowanduz Gorge near the city of Soran in the North of Iraq

The town of Rawandiz was established by the Rawadid dynasty in the 10th century. The area came under the rule of the Emirate of Bradost after the Battle of Chaldiran in 1514. The town would later come under the rule of the Soran Emirate until 1836.

The name Randūz, referring to modern Rawanduz, appears in a Mişûr, a type of Yazidi religious manuscripts written in Arabic that record religiously affiliated tribes, regions and the murids (followers) of Yazidi pîrs, as well as the religious donations (zakat) and contributions owed to them, including shares of agricultural produce, livestock, and other dues. The Mişûr dedicated to the Yazidi saint Pīr Khatīb Pisī includes a reference to “a quarter and a half of Randūz”. Mişûrs are generally considered to have originated in the 13th century, though surviving copies were produced later. The manuscript containing this reference was copied in 1278 AH (1862 CE).

In 1915, during the First World War, the town was occupied by the Russians and Assyrians. The Rawandiz massacre took place, where the Kurdish Muslim population was massacred by the Russian army and allied Assyrian militants; after Nikolai Baratov's Cossacks recaptured the town, only 20 percent of the Kurdish population managed to survive. In 1922 the town was occupied by the Turks, until they were driven out at the end of the year. The British army occupied the town on 22 April 1923. The British decided to stay in place to await the arrival of a special commission to fix the border between Turkey and Iraq, believing that if they left the Turkish troops would return.

Between 1928 and 1932 the British built a strategic road from Erbil, through Rawandiz, to the Iranian border near modern-day Piranshahr. The construction of the road was directed by the New Zealand engineer A. M. Hamilton. In 1940, the population was 1970.

As of July 2007, Rawandiz was undergoing major reconstruction. The bazaar was being relocated to make room for a new road. In July 2011, in a response to a Turkish military offensive, local artists decided to paint the debris from the raids. In 1930, A. M. Hamilton noted: "it has always been a place of grim deeds and bloody retributions. Its greater and its lesser rulers alike have nearly all met with violent deaths and even today this reputation is being well earned". The anthropologist Edmund Leach went to Rawandiz in 1938, to study the Rawandiz Kurds, intending to make this the subject of his thesis. His field trip had to be aborted because of the Munich crisis, but he nevertheless published his monograph "Social and Economic Organization of the Rowanduz Kurds" two years later.

== Climate ==
Like most of Iraqi Kurdistan, Rawanduz has a hot-summer Mediterranean climate (Csa) with very hot dry summers and cool, wet winters. The winters see lows below freezing in many nights, making frost prevalent. Snowfall occurs occasionally.

Climate data for Rawandiz
Month	Jan	Feb	Mar	Apr	May	Jun	Jul	Aug	Sep	Oct	Nov	Dec	Year
Mean daily maximum °C (°F)	5.3 (41.5)	9 (48)	13.4 (56.1)	20 (68)	28.1 (82.6)	33 (91)	36 (97)	42 (108)	38 (100)	28.2 (82.8)	18.5 (65.3)	11.4 (52.5)	23.6 (74.4)
Daily mean °C (°F)	−0.3 (31.5)	3.5 (38.3)	6.7 (44.1)	14.5 (58.1)	21.4 (70.5)	26.5 (79.7)	29.8 (85.6)	32.7 (90.9)	28.4 (83.1)	20.8 (69.4)	12.8 (55.0)	6.7 (44.1)	17.0 (62.5)
Mean daily minimum °C (°F)	−6 (21)	−2 (28)	0 (32)	9 (48)	14.7 (58.5)	20.0 (68.0)	23.6 (74.5)	23.4 (74.1)	18.9 (66.0)	13.4 (56.1)	7.2 (45.0)	2.0 (35.6)	10.4 (50.6)
Average precipitation mm (inches)	147 (5.8)	169 (6.7)	141 (5.6)	98 (3.9)	41 (1.6)	0 (0)	0 (0)	0 (0)	1 (0.0)	12 (0.5)	77 (3.0)	108 (4.3)	794 (31.4)
Source: Climate Data

== Tourism ==
The striking scenery has been noted by a number of visitors to the region. A. M. Hamilton relates that the Rawanduz gorge was said to be the finest in Asia.

The Pank Tourist Resort, which was opened in 2007, it was the first such resort in Iraq. It includes a Ferris wheel and other rides, including a toboggan and Bobsled. Also includes a five-star hotel, restaurants, swimming pools, saunas, tennis courts, helipads and mini golf. Mount Korek is one of the top 10 destinations to visit in the Kurdistan region of Iraq, there is a 4 kilometer long Doppelmayr Teleferic (cable car) from its Bekhal Bottom station to Mount Korek. The mountain is developed as an international destination. The Resort has developed 132 villas and several rides in his project which is called "The Korek Mountain Resort & Spa". There are also restaurants, cafes and helipads. The resort is a summer retreat providing cool environs when the whole region reels under high temperatures. During winters, it turns into a Ski Resort.

== Gallery ==
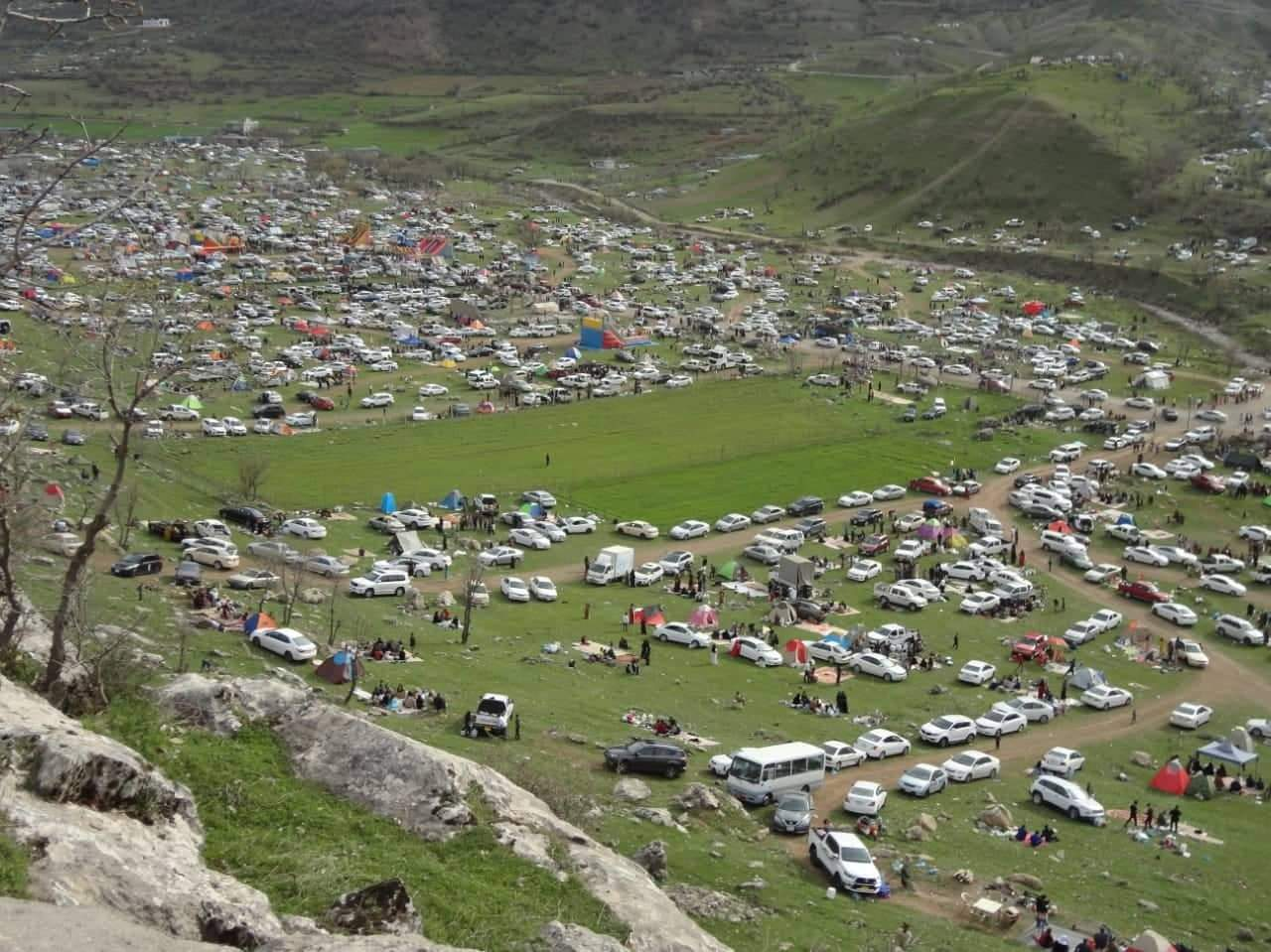
Nowruz 2021 in Rawanduz District

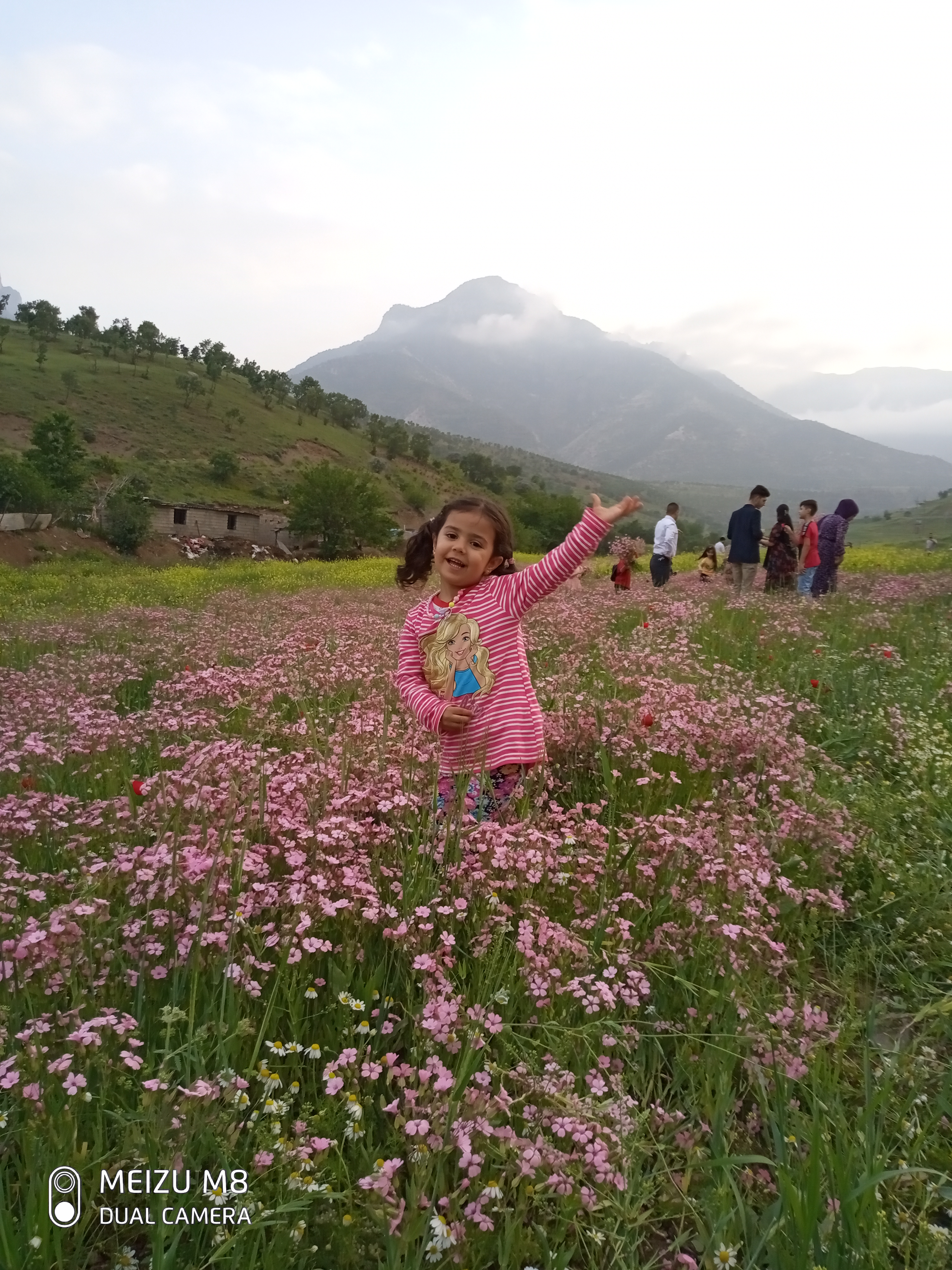
Peruyan

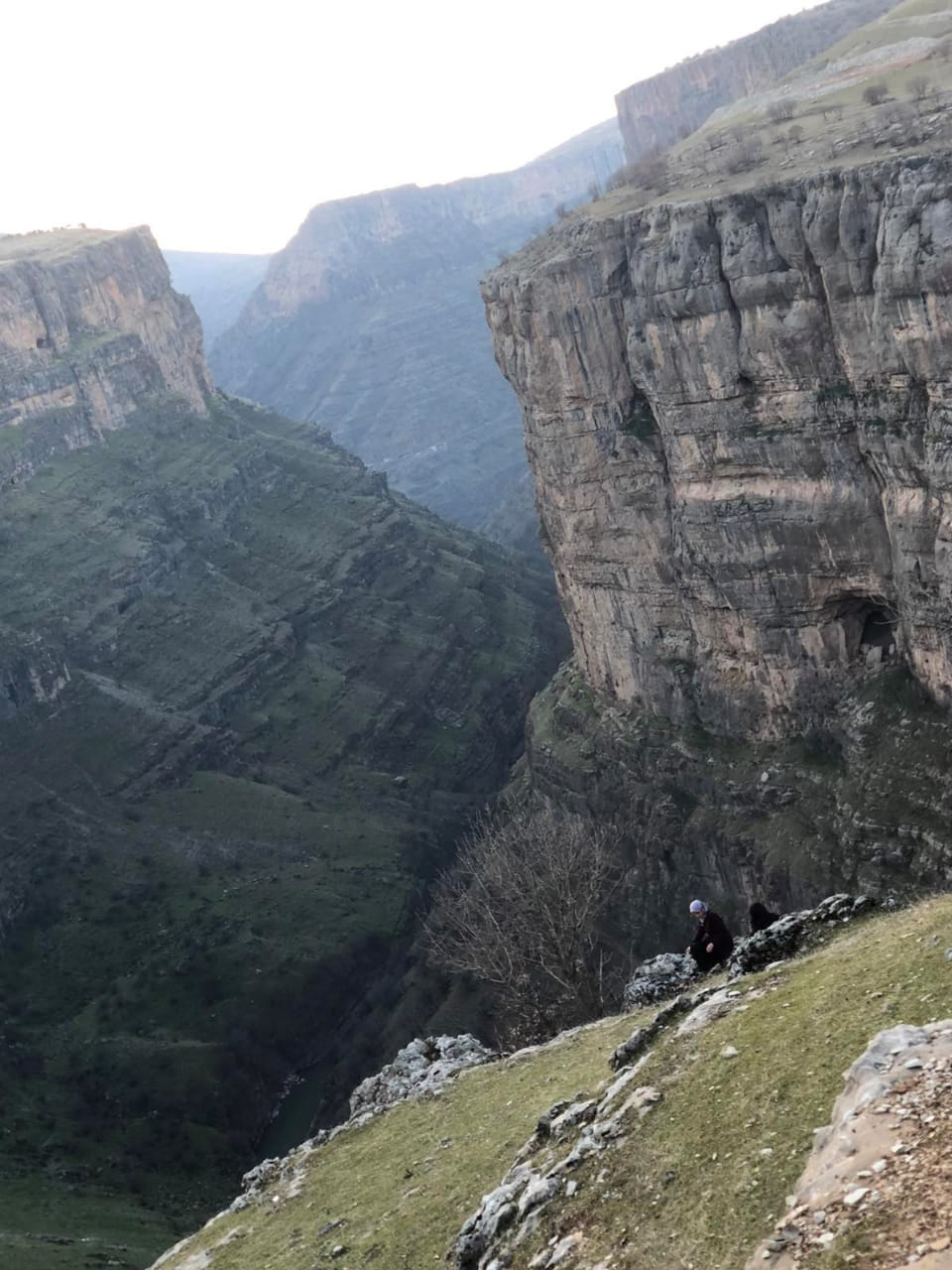
Rawanduz Gorge

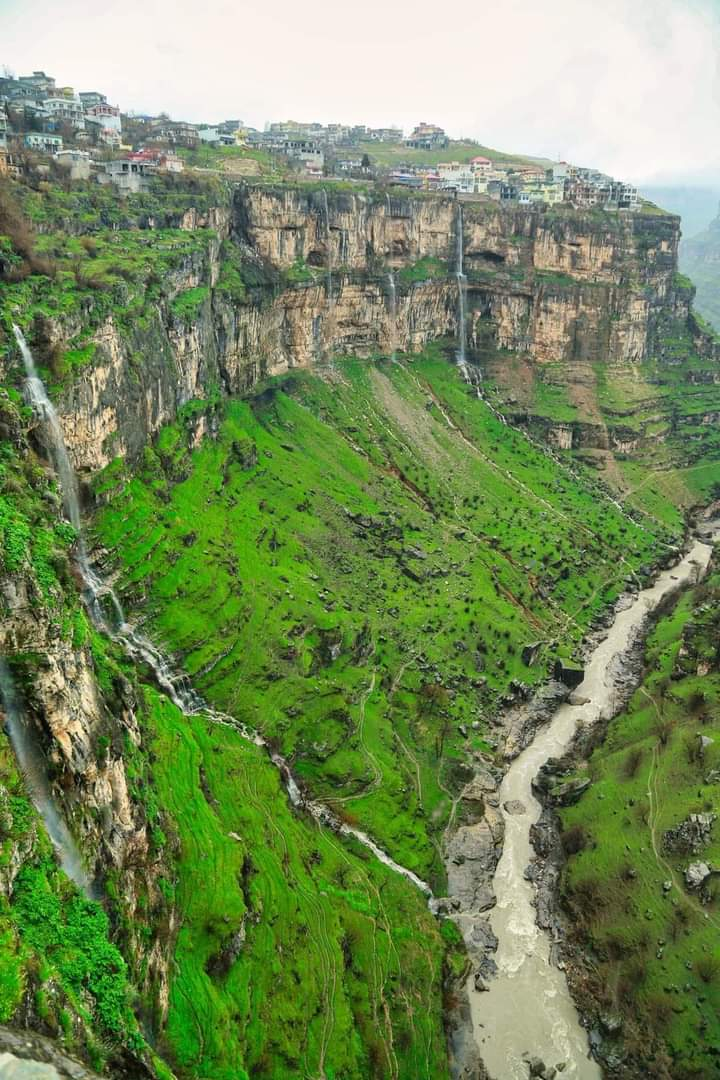
Rawanduz Gorge

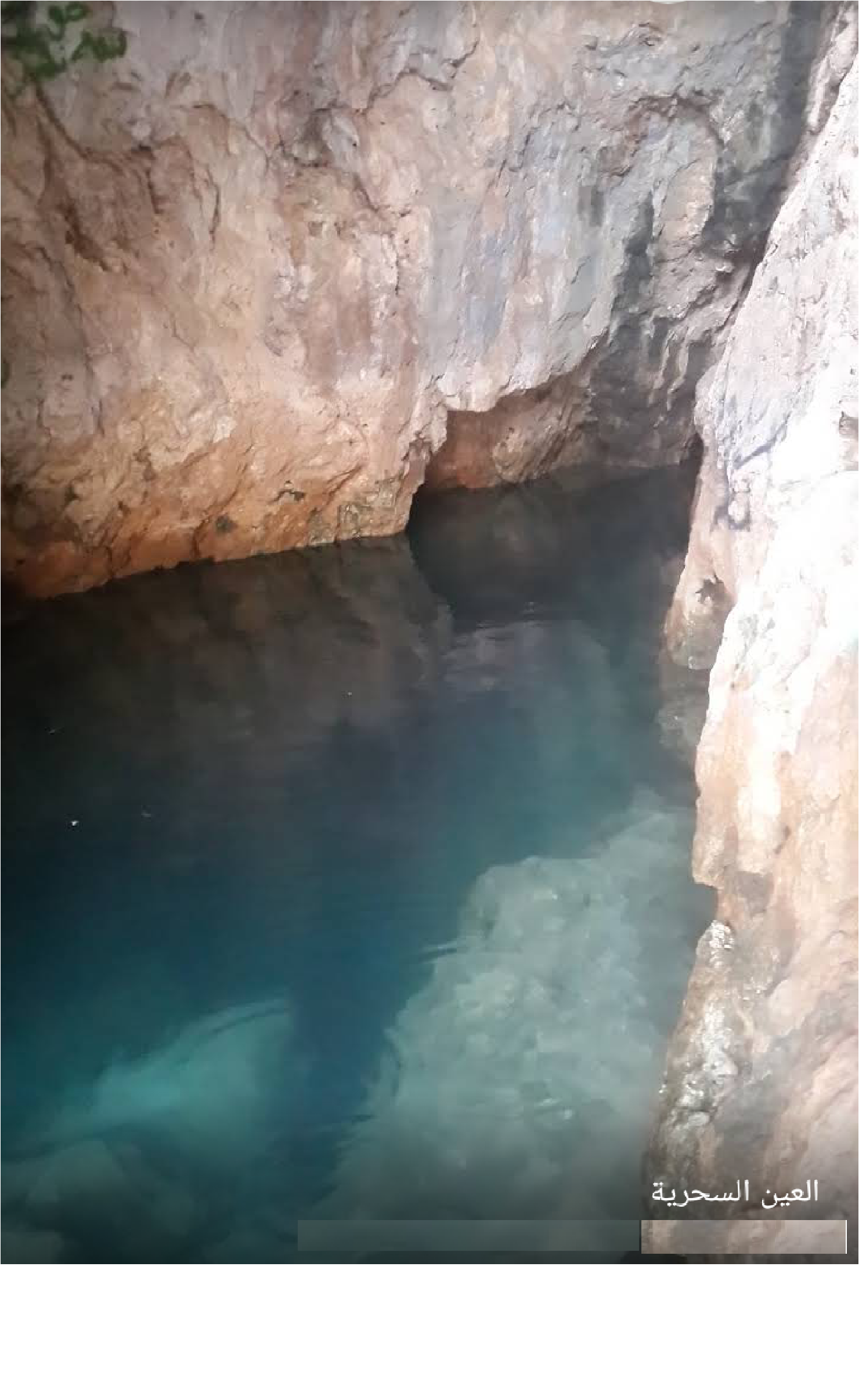
Jundian

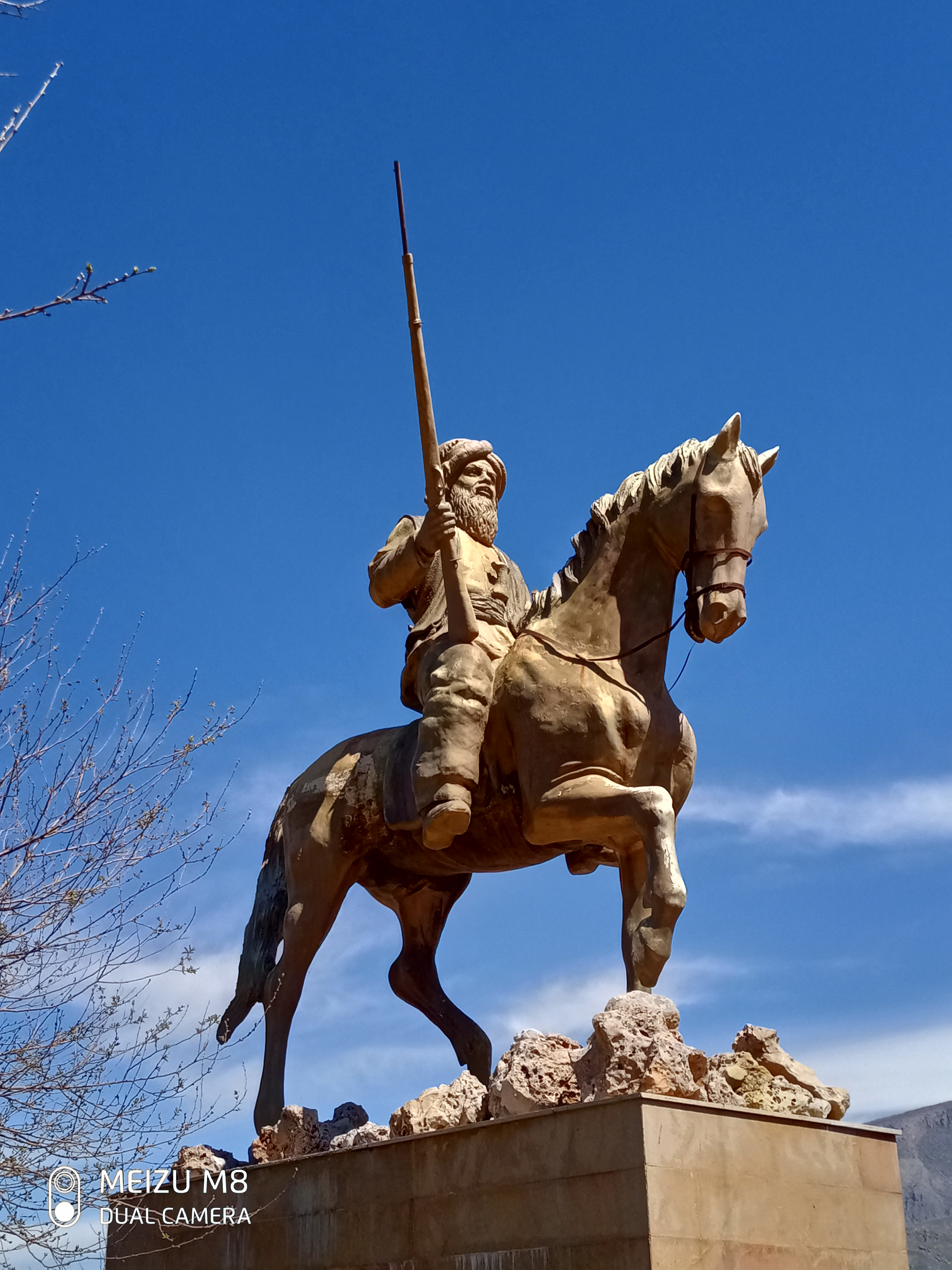
The statue of Muhammad Pasha of Rawanduz

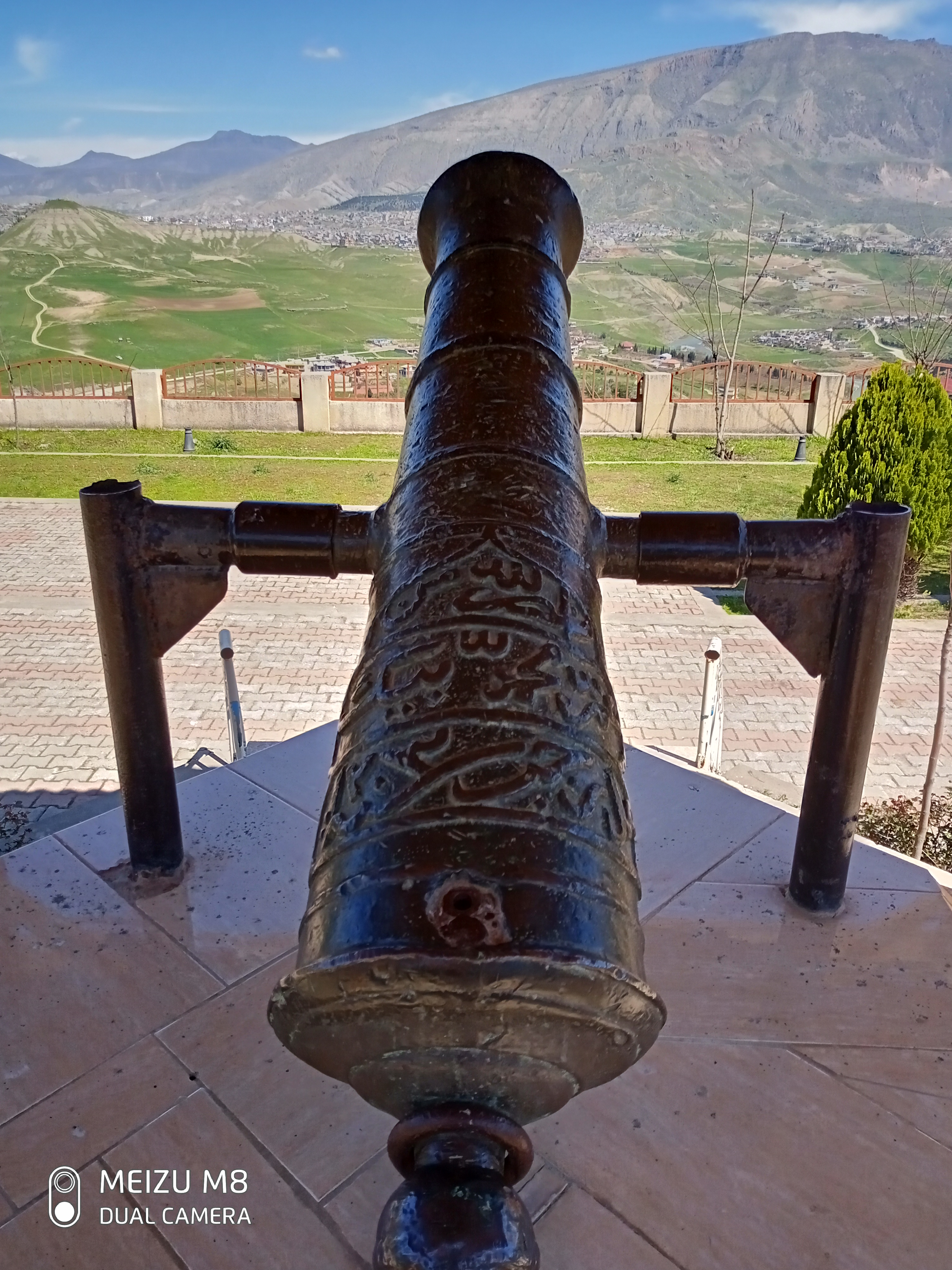
Wasta Rajab Cannon

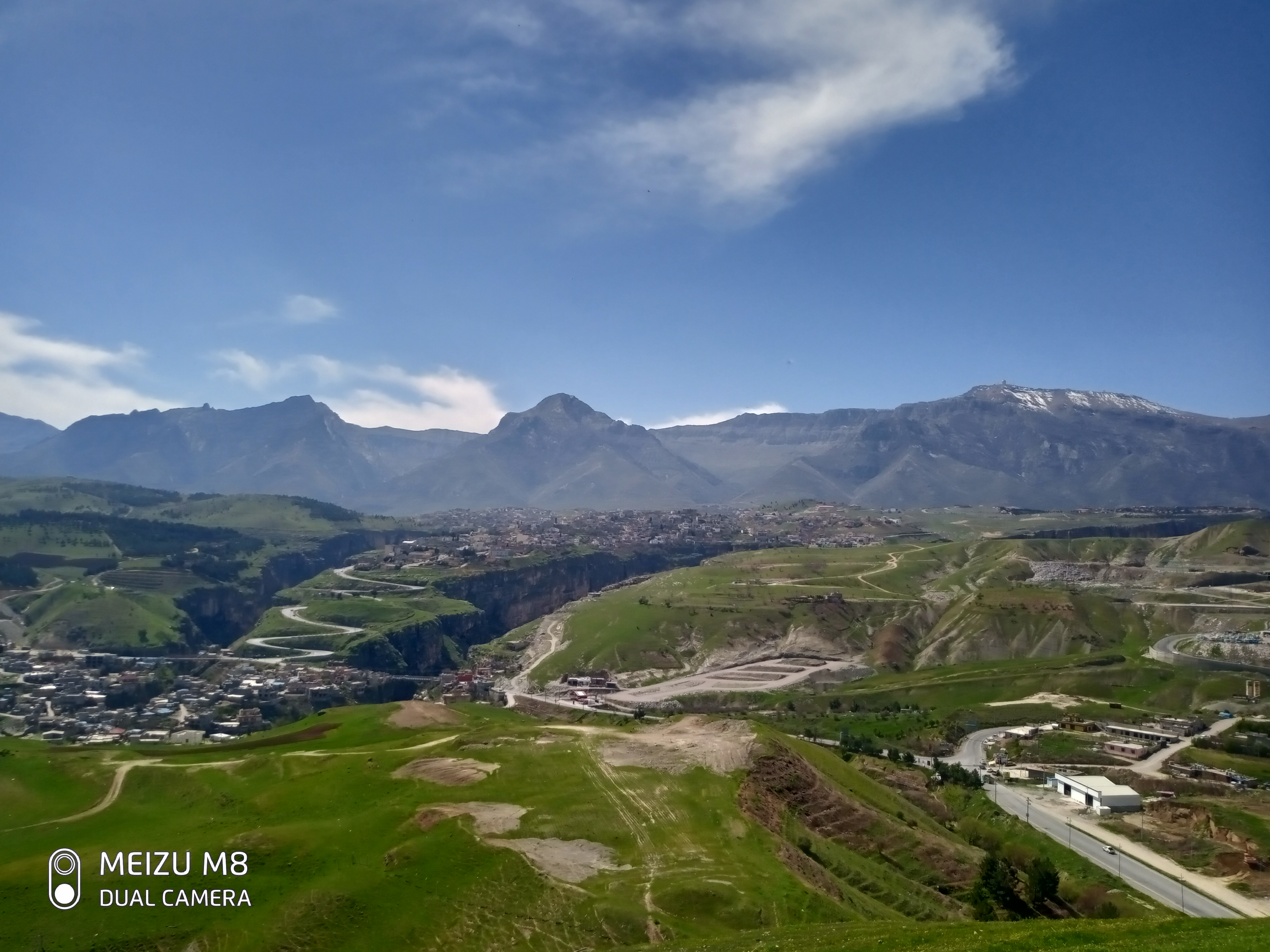
Kawloka and behind it the city of Rawandiz

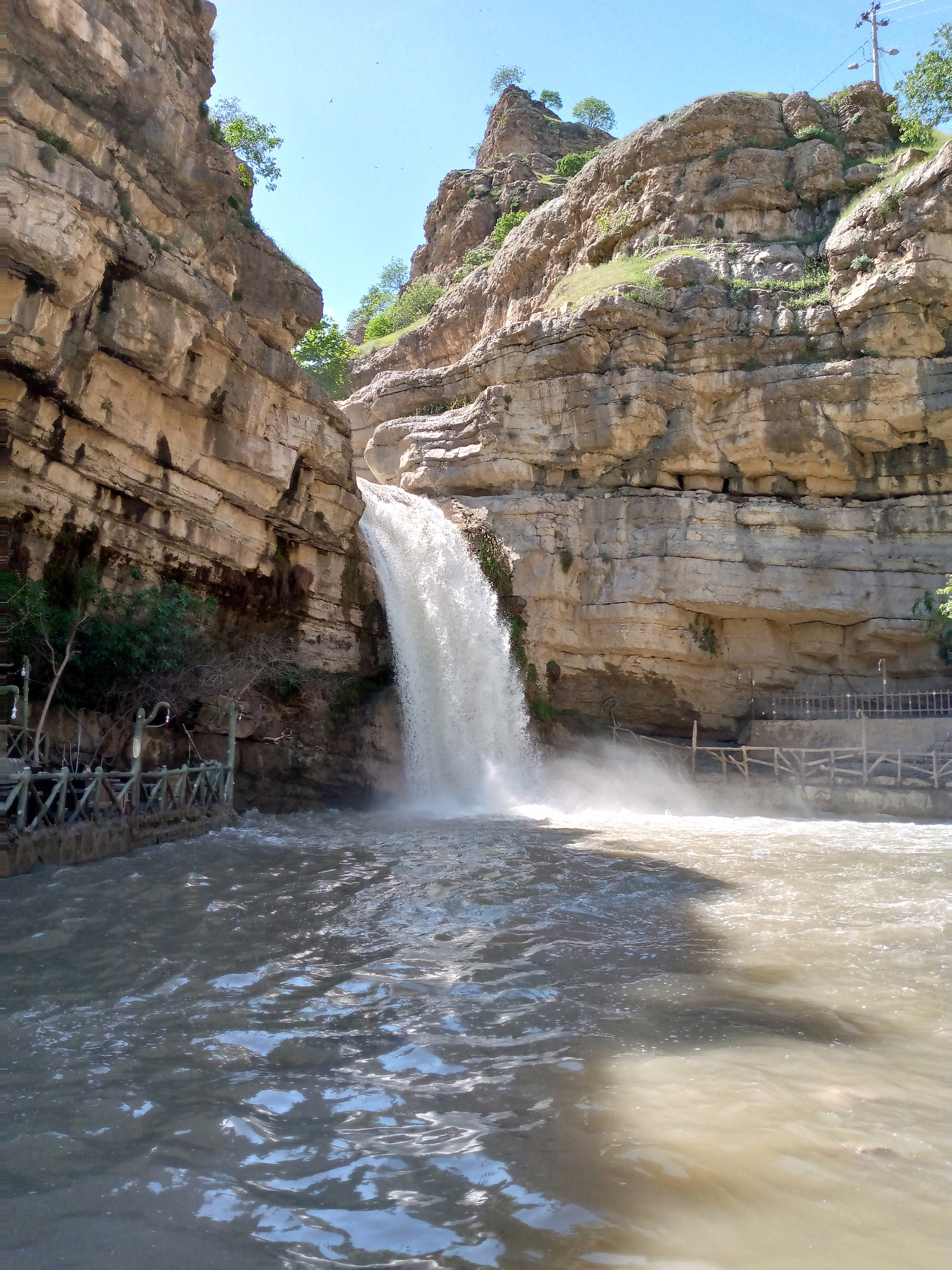
Geli Ali Beg Waterfall in Rawanduz

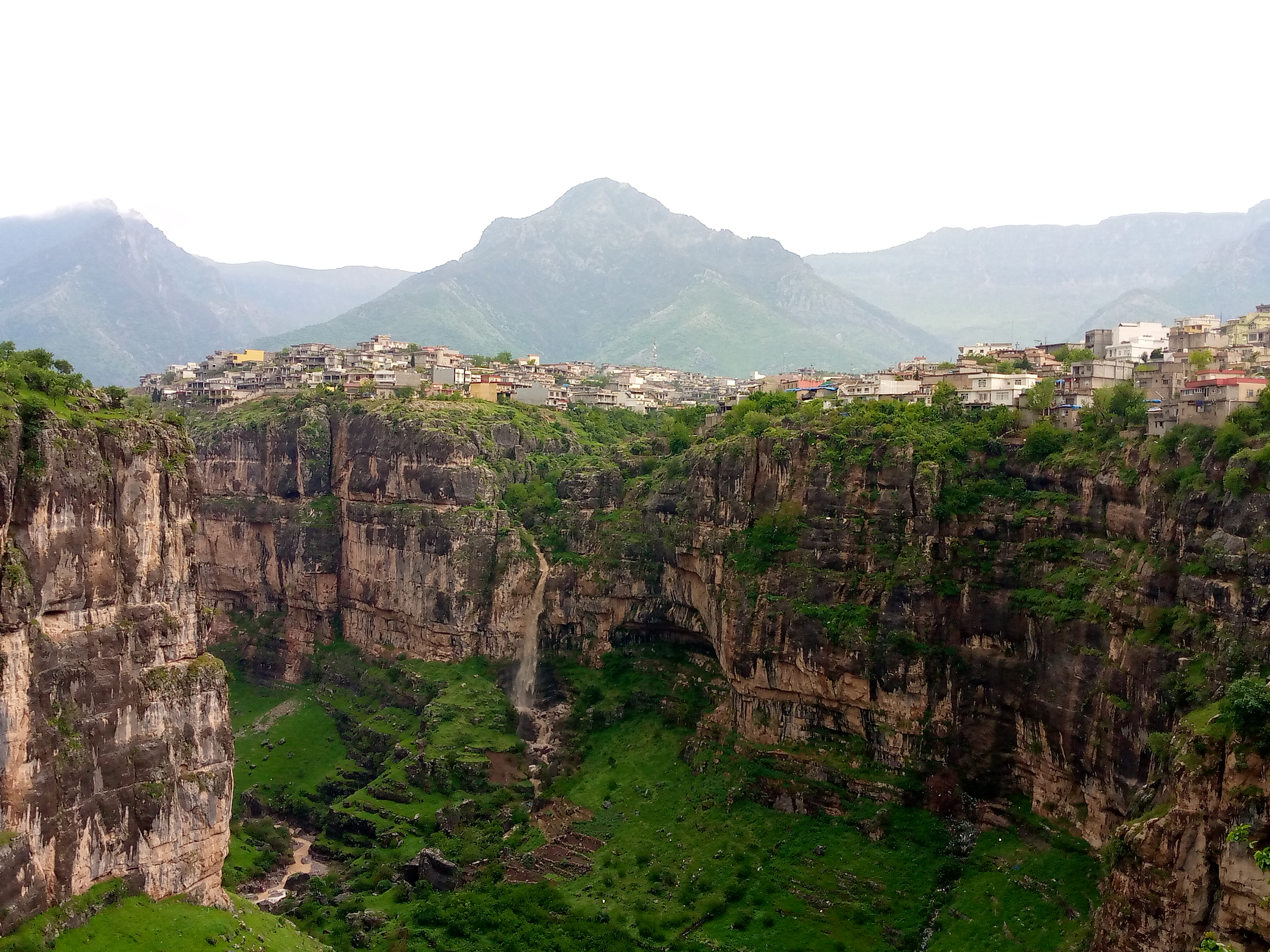
Xerend Waterfall in Rawanduz

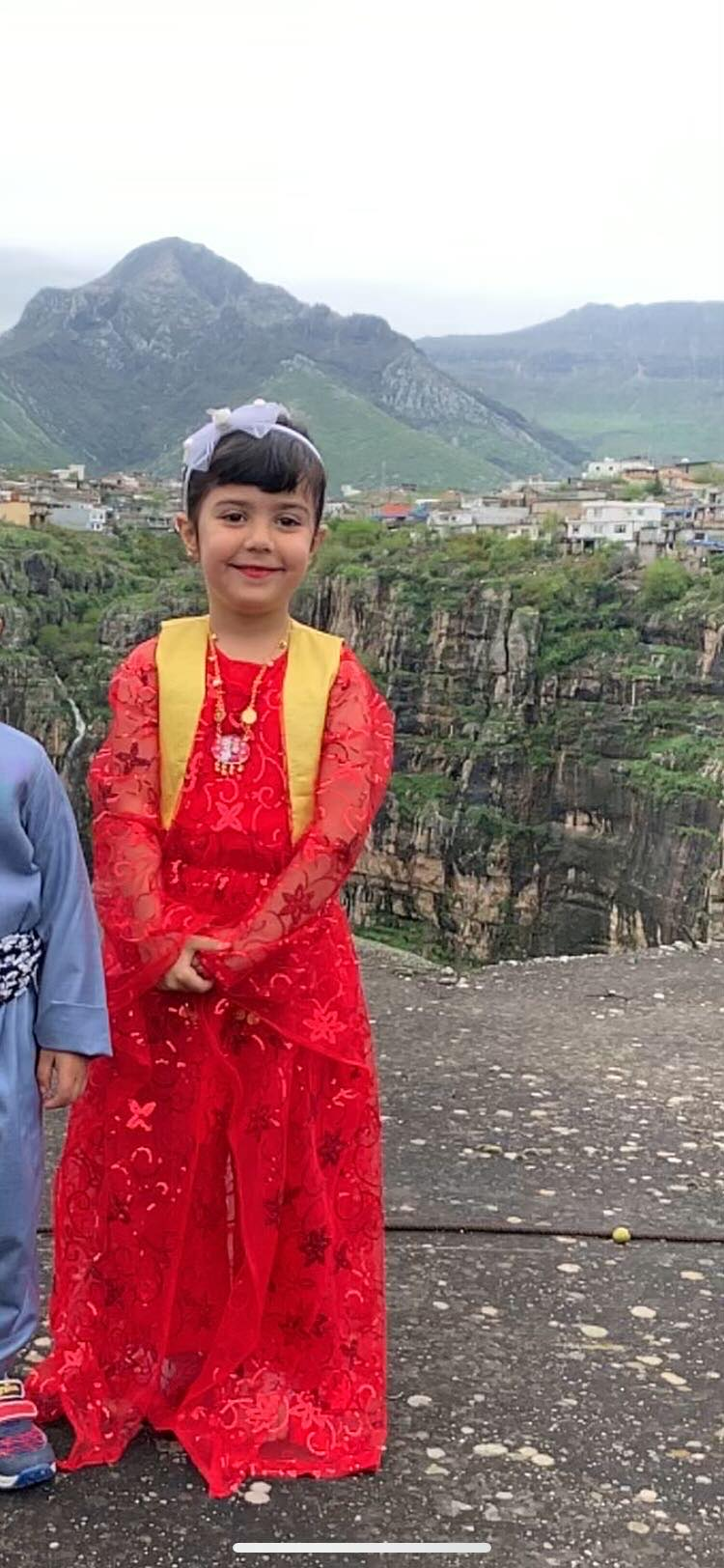
A girl in Kurdish dress in Rawanduz
