= Balak (tribe) =

Kurdish tribe

The Balak or Balek (Kurdish: باڵەک) is an ancient Kurdish tribe living in the former Soran Emirate which is now part of Erbil Governorate in Southern Kurdistan. The tribe is located in the mountainous region of northern Erbil Governorate in Southern Kurdistan. People from the Balak area speak a mixture of the Kurdish Sorani and Kurmanji dialects.

== Distribution ==
Like most Kurdish tribes, the people from the Balak tribe mainly live in the mountains. Balak area ranges from Rawanduz district in the southwest, to the Haji Omaran sub-district in the northeast.

There are two main districts in Balak, Choman and Rawanduz, and five sub-districts: Warte, Smilan, Galala, Qasre, and Haji Omeran. The Balak region is located 120 km north of Erbil, the capital of the Erbil Governorate and borders Eastern Kurdistan region in Iran.

== History ==
Choman is considered the capital of the Balak tribe nowadays. Rawandiz was the capital of the Soran Emirate, which was based in the geographic region of Kurdistan, specifically in what is today known as Southern Kurdistan.

The emirate gained its full independence from the Ottoman Empire shortly after its capture from Safavid control in the 1530s. It was later reincorporated into the Ottoman Empire and served as a semi-autonomous vassal state for two centuries. The emirate slowly regained full independence for a second time during the late 18th century and early 19th century, but was once again eventually subdued by Ottoman troops in 1835. The city of Rawandiz served as the capital during most of its reign.

During his travels across Kurdistan in October and November 1836, Major Rawlinson observed that the Mîr of Rawanduz, Muhammad Pasha, brought tribesmen under his sway and conscripted a male from each family into his service as was his usual custom, and that the Balak tribe contingent proved to of great service to him.

== Name ==
The name of the Balak tribe came from the area that they inhabit. The earliest mention of the Balak tribe comes from a 14th-century book, Masalik al-absar fi mamalik al-amsar, authored by the Arab geographer Ibn Fadlallah al-Umari, in which the name Balak is said to be derived from Balakan village in Northern Kurdistan.

Balakan means "Home of the Balaks". The Balaks are also mentioned by the Ottoman Kurdish nationalist Şerif Pasha, who wrote that some clans of the Balak reside in Zooka and Mashkan regions of Northern Kurdistan. The Balak Tribe are also mentioned in the Seyahatname by Evliya Çelebi.

== Notable people ==
=== Leaders and notable people from the Mala Sharafi Clan ===
- Mala Sharaf, a 17th-century landlord and chief of the Balak tribe.
- Mustafa Agha Nawpirdani, the most popular leader of the Balak tribe, he came from a nationalist family and was a Peshmerga at the revolts in his area of Balakayati from 1974 to 1983. Then he went undercover into the Iraqi Government and became Commander of the 33rd Regiment and the 48th special detachment of the Iraqi Army (estimated to be nearly 6,000 soldiers) all under his command working undercover for the Peshmerga, due to continuous support and aid for the KDP and PUK Peshmerga through weapons, equipment, money, and medical supplies. He was imprisoned and sentenced to death, but was granted a presidential pardon and served three years in the notorious Abu Ghraib prison. After being released, through his strong connections and relations with the KDP leadership, he rejoined the Peshmerga and regrouped his tribes forces (estimated to be 3,000 soldiers) with which he planned and participated the uprisings against Saddam Hussein’s regime. He fought numerous battles in Erbil, in which he captured Pirzin and Shaways from the Baathist forces. He died during an ambush on his convoy on the way to the Citadel of Erbil.
- Shaikh Muhammad Agha (died 1952), Balak's most powerful Leader. Established good relations with both the British Government and the King of Iraq. He became a member of the Iraqi Parliament in 1938.
- Shemhamad Balak, prominent Peshmerga commander, former Politburo member of PASOK.
- Hasan Kwestani (1950-1994) Prominent Peshmarga Leader in Patriotic Union of Kurdistan. He was assassinated by the KDP on 17 May 1994.

=== Other notable people ===
- Hamadamin Nawpirdani, Senior Cadre in the Kurdistan Democratic Party and official in the Kurdistan Regional Government, Former Director of Education of the Kurdish Capital of Erbil, and the brother of Mustafa Nawpirdani.
- Nafiz Mustafa Nawpirdani, Member and head of oil and gas commission in the Erbil Provincial Council, high status member in the Patriotic Union of Kurdistan, and the eldest son of the late leader Mustafa Nawpirdani.
- Sheikh Muhammad Balak, a leader of the Suhrawardiyya Sufi order in the 17th century.
- Azad Jundiani (b. 1960), Senior Advisor of President Barzani
- Hemin Malazade, anchorman at Rudaw TV and 24/7 Kurdish News Channel
