= Banoka =

Banoka بەنۆکە
- Village
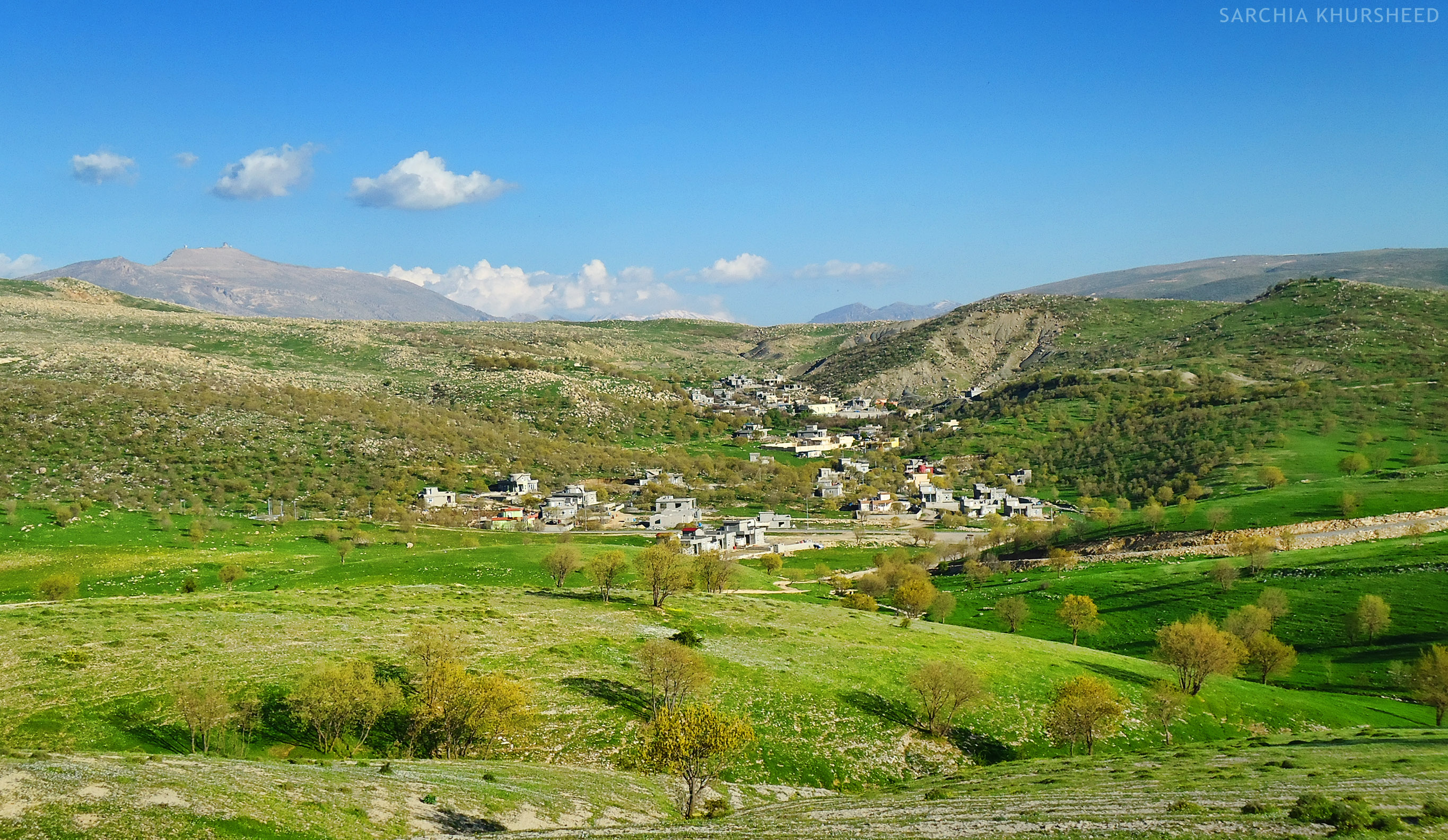
- Banoka Village, 30 March 2013

- Location within Iraqi Kurdistan Location within Iraq
- Coordinates: 36°37′49.9″N 44°19′9.94″E
- Country: Iraq
- Region: Kurdistan Region
- Governorate: Erbil Governorate
- District: Soran District
- Sub-district: Khalifan
- Elevation: 850 m (2,790 ft)
- Time zone: UTC+3:00 (UTC)

Banoka (Kurdish: بەنۆکە) is a village located in Kurdistan Region's Erbil Province. It is located in the northeast of Erbil, near the town of Khalifan.

== Gallery ==
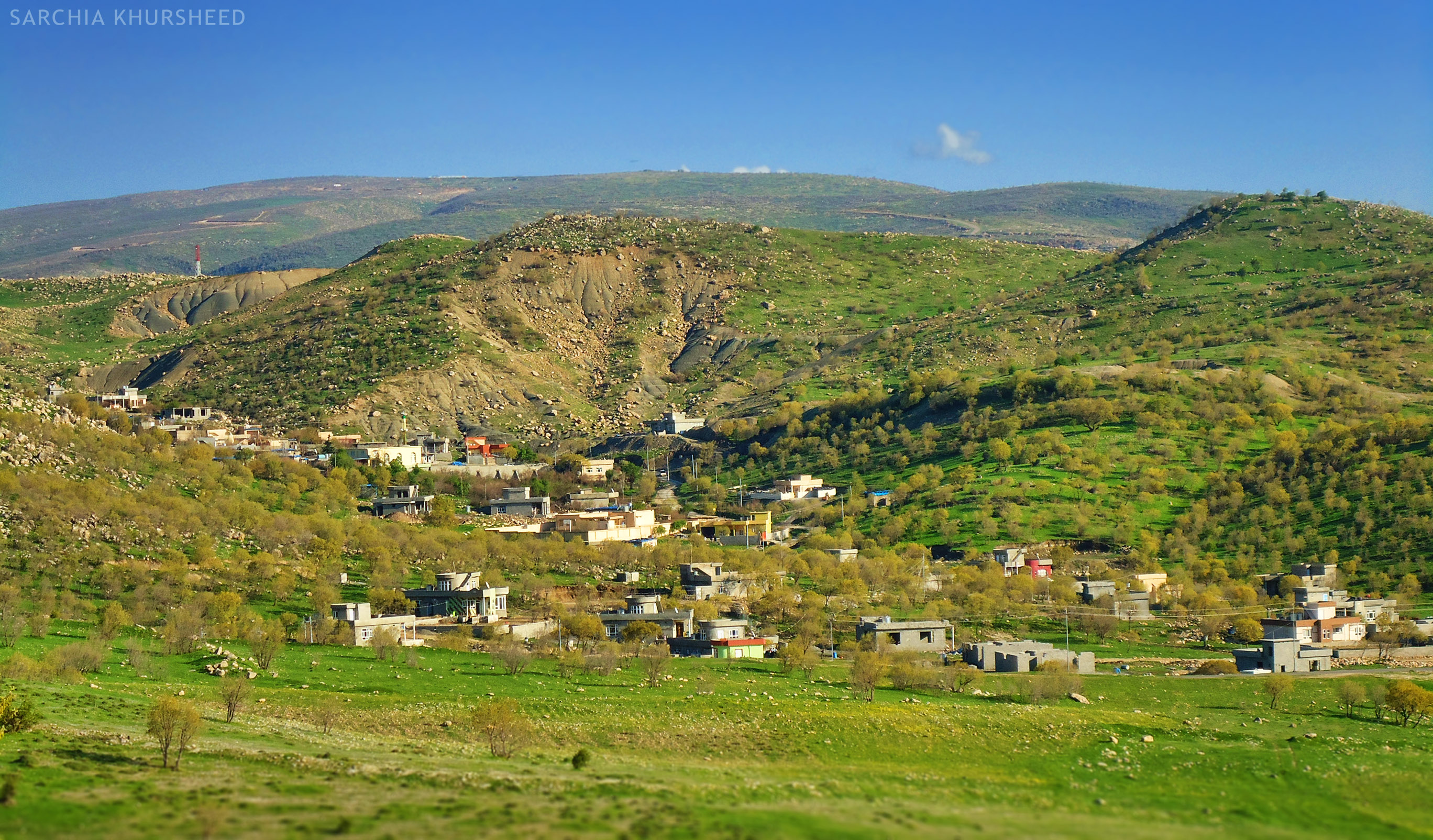

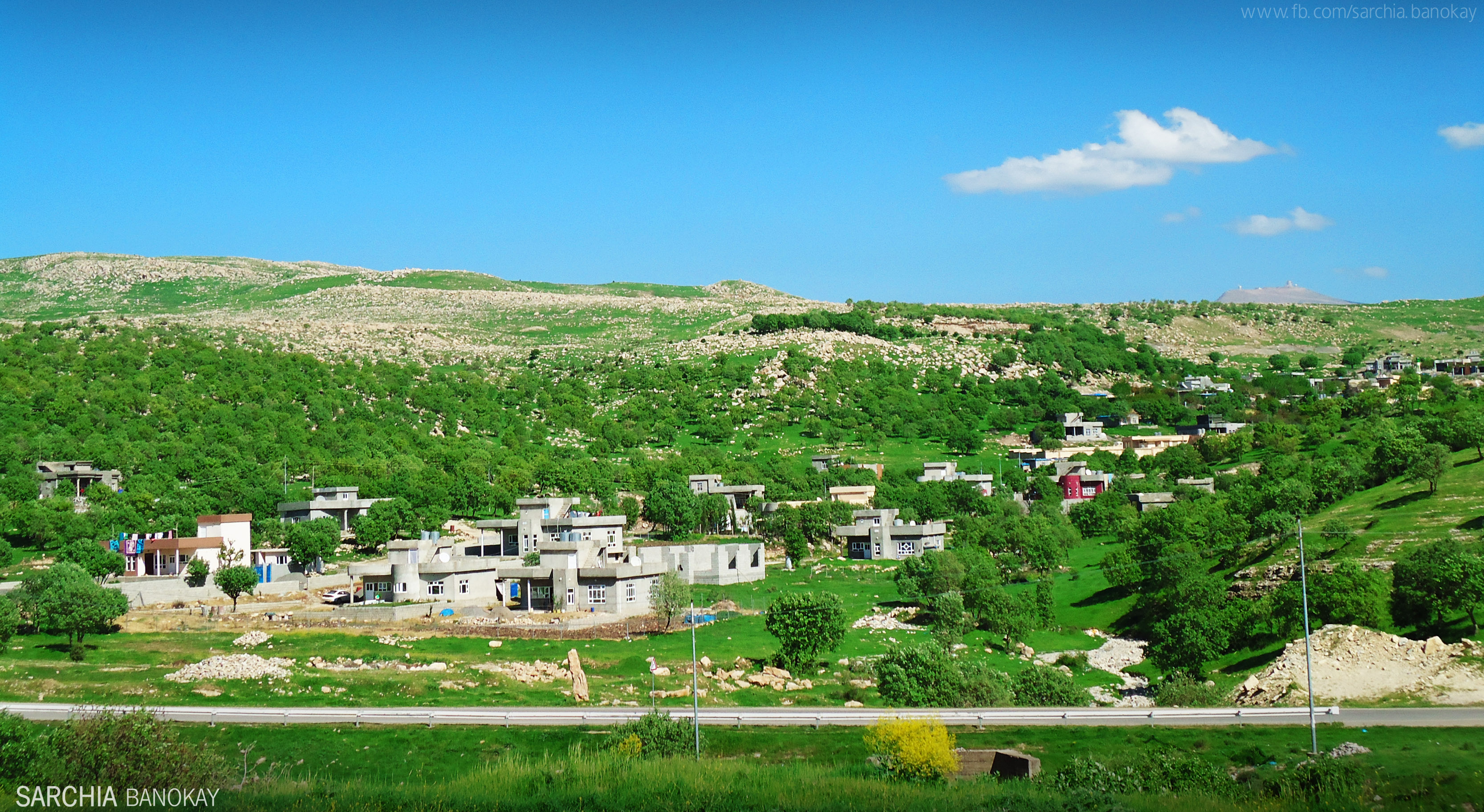

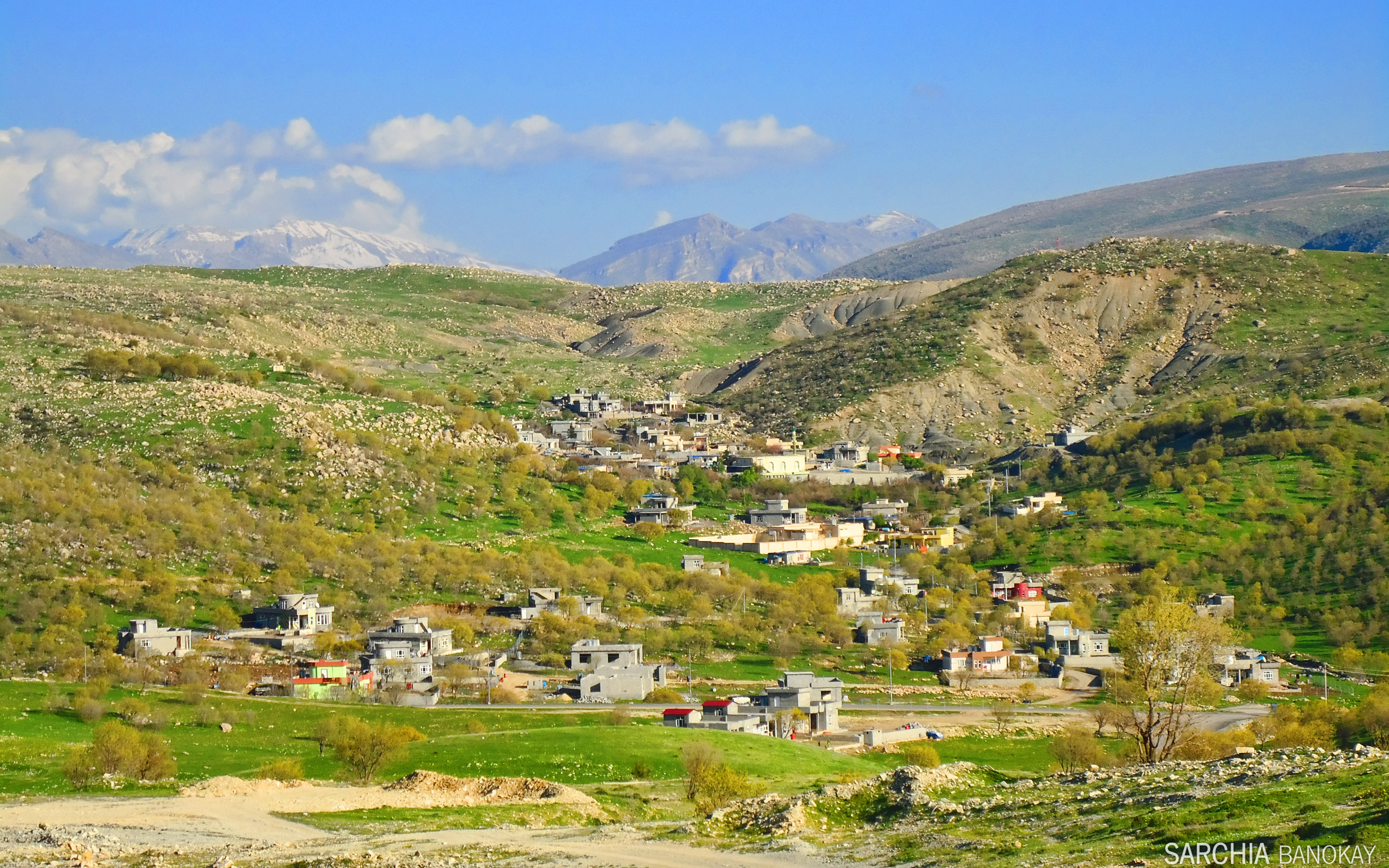

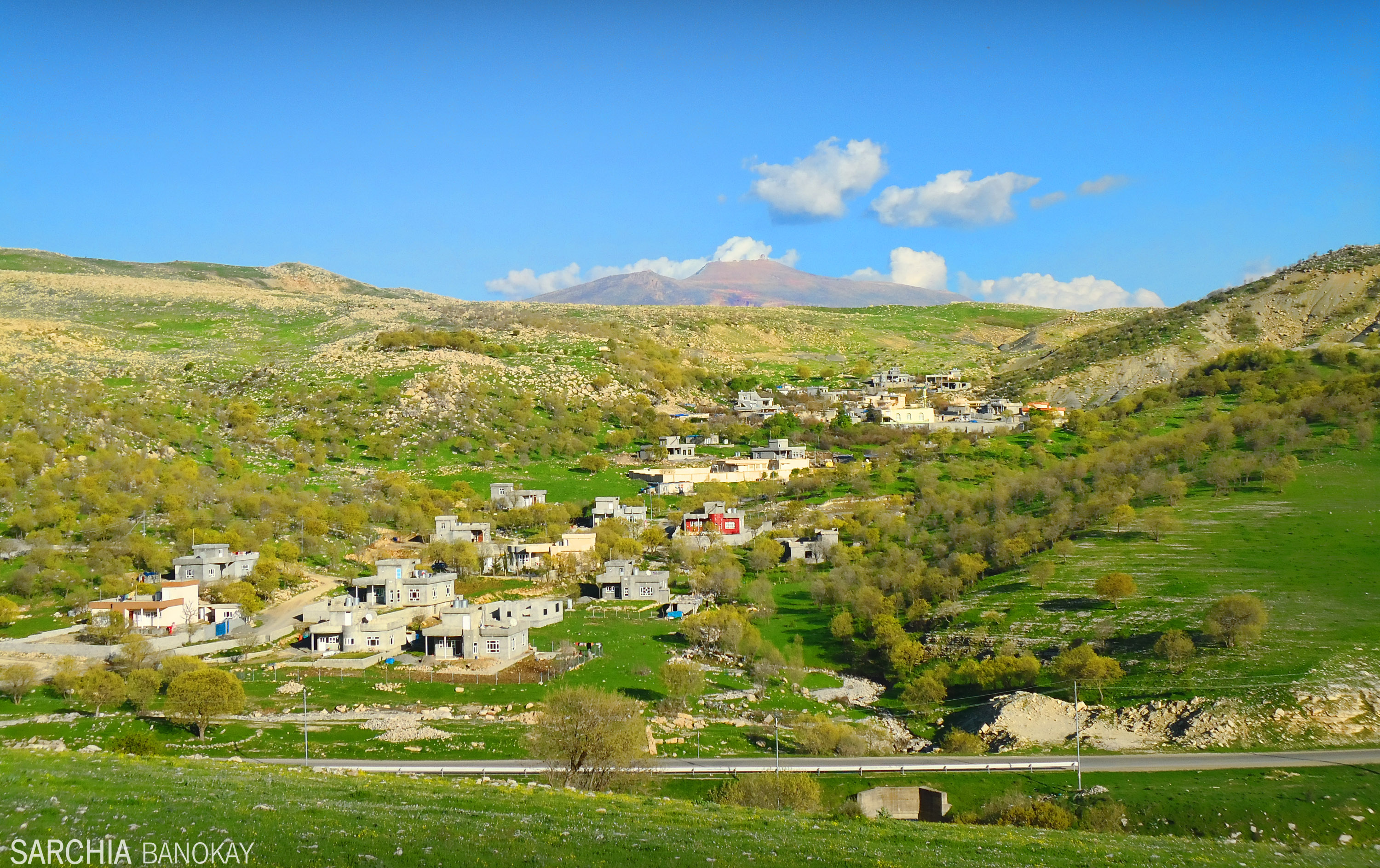

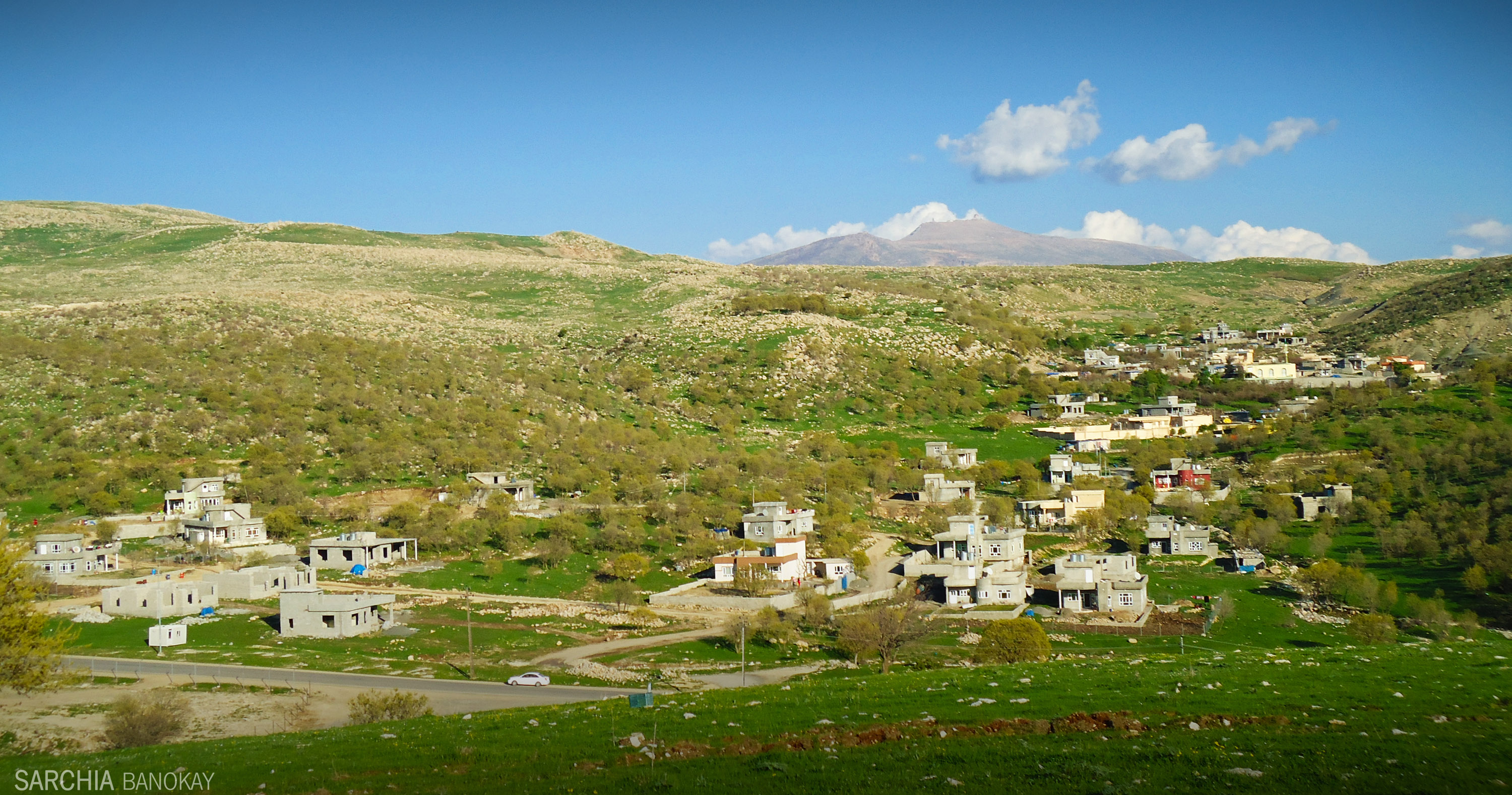

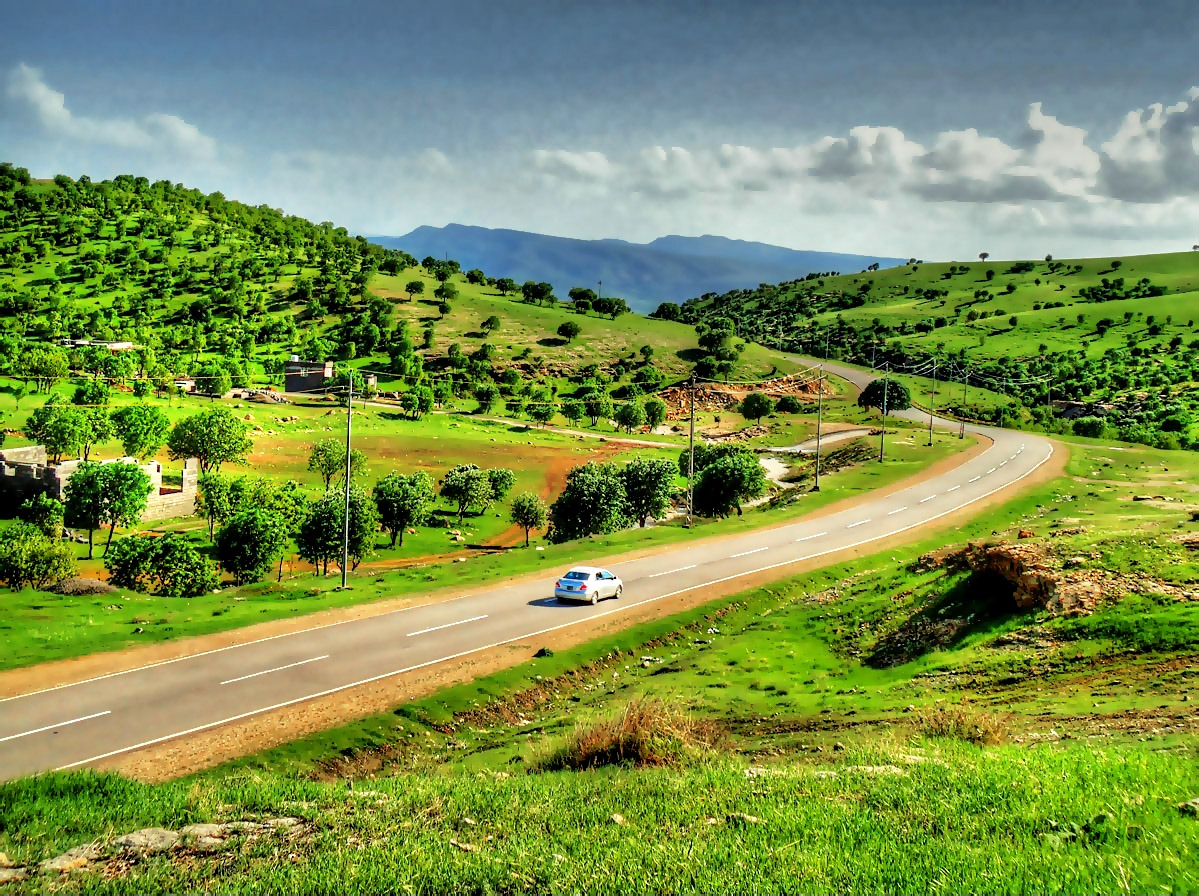
