= Halgurd Sakran National Park =

- Interactive map of Halgurd Sakran National Park
- Location: Kurdistan, Iraq
- Nearest city: Choman
- Coordinates: 36.675670°N 45.040280°E
- Area: 1,000 square kilometres (390 sq mi)

Halgurd Sakran National Park (HSNP) will be the first National Park in the mountains of Iraq. HSNP is situated in Erbil Province, 170-kilometre (110 mi) north-east of the capital city of Erbil and located on border triangle of Iraq, Iran and Turkey.

HSNP will be the largest protected mountain area in Kurdistan; it is expected to cover more than 1,000-square-kilometre (390 sq mi) with an elevation between 900 metres (3,000 ft) and 3,609-metre (11,841 ft) (at Halgurd Peak), of the Sakran Mountain Range, a part of the Zagros Mountains, which is famous for the spectacular and impressive rock formation, beautiful valleys and mountain meadows with multitude of wild flora and fauna.

Halgurd and Sakran Mountains are part of one of the most unspoiled areas in Kurdistan; the high elevations ensure that snow covers some parts of the summits of the highest peaks all years around. Preliminary approach for delineation and zoning of the envisaged Halgurd Sakran National Park in mountain areas around the city of Choman, identified using modern technology.

== Notes ==
References

- Schwartzstein, Peter. "The Explosive Battle to Build an Iraqi National Park". National Geographic. Archived from the original on January 31, 2019.
