= Choman =

Choman may refer to:

- Choman (city), a city in the Erbil Governorate in the Kurdistan region of Iraq
- Choman District, a district in Erbil Province, Iraq
- Choman Hardi (born 1974), contemporary Kurdish poet, translator and painter
