= Jandyan Waterfall =

Waterfall in Iraq

Jandyan Waterfall (Kurdish: هاوینەهەواری جندیان, romanized: Hawînehewarî Cindîyan) is located in the Kurdistan Region in Iraq. It is situated on the main road between Soran and Choman District, 112 kilometres (70 mi) northeast of Erbil and 5 kilometres (3.1 mi) from Soran.
