= Bahirka District =

Bahirka District بەحرکە Baharka District; Bahrka District
- District
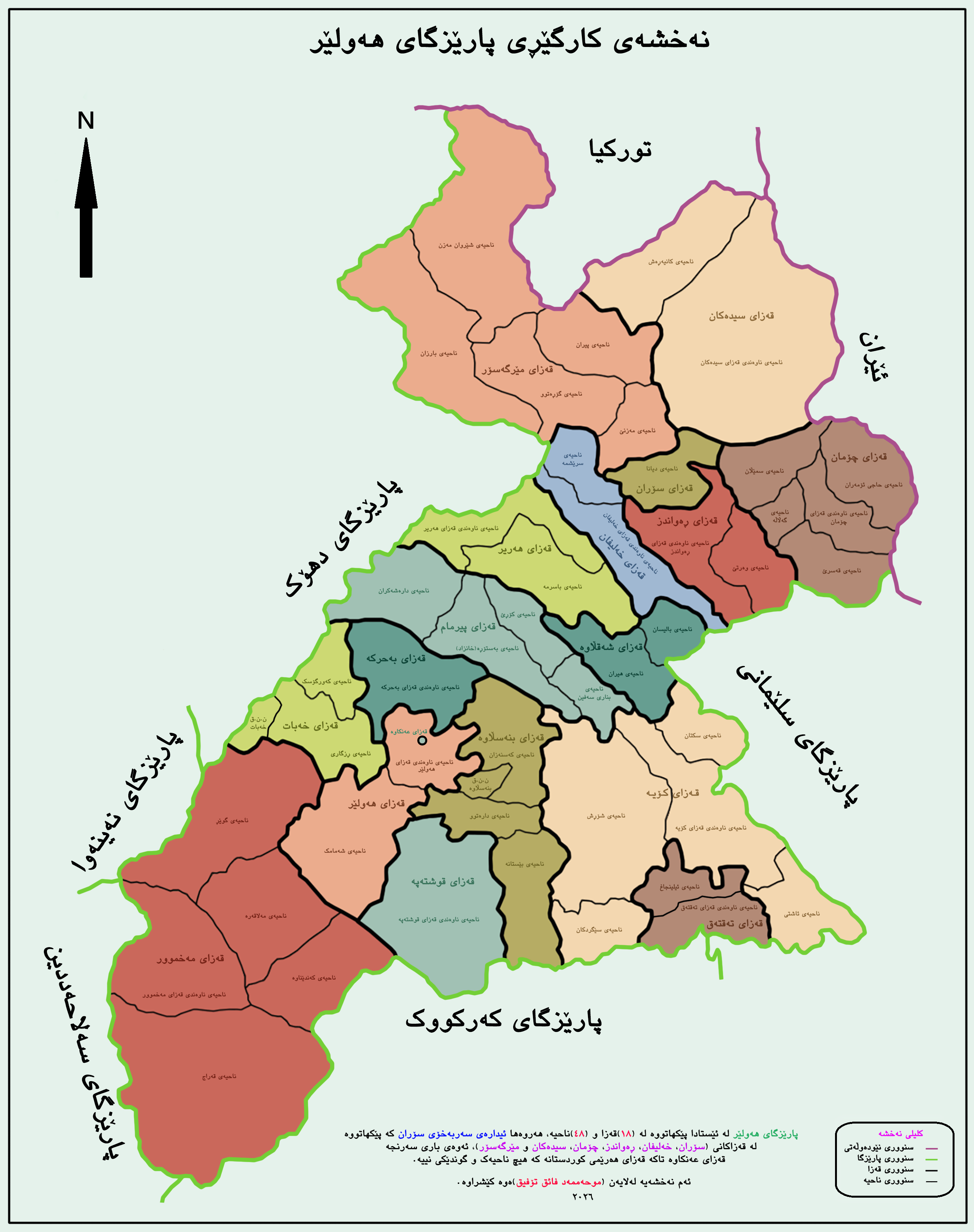
- Map of Erbil Governorate

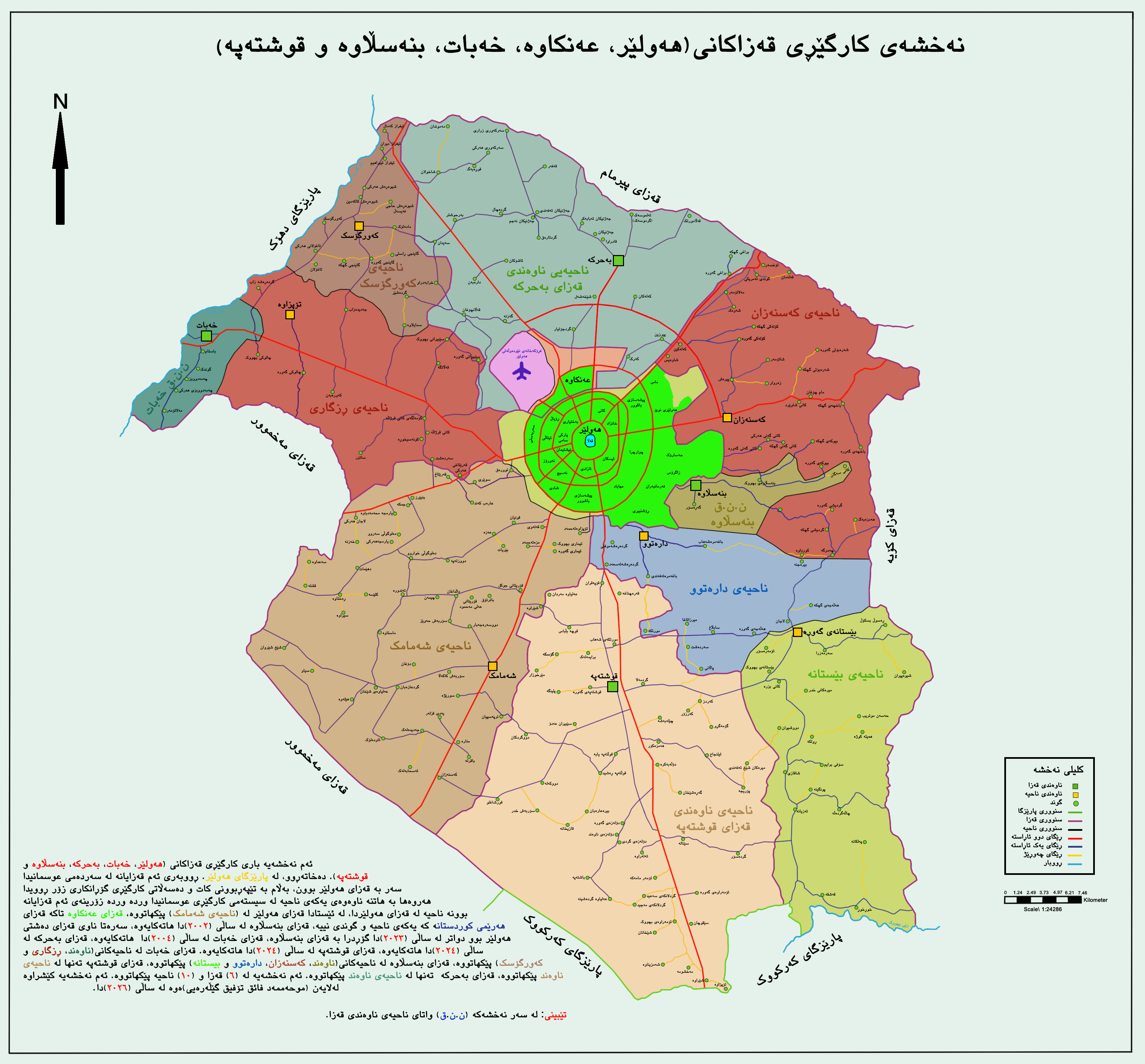
- A map containing Erbil District and its surroundings
- Coordinates: 36°19′8″N 44°2′18″E
- Country: Iraq
- Region: Kurdistan Region
- Governorate: Erbil Governorate
- Became a subdistrict: 2003
- Became a district: 2024
- Seat: Bahirka

Population (c. 2023–2024)
  - Total: 32,710
- Time zone: UTC+3 (AST)

Bahirka District (Kurdish: قەزای بەحرکە, romanized: Qezay Behirke), also known as Baharka District or Bahrka District, is a district (qaza) in the Erbil Governorate of the Kurdistan Region of Iraq. It sits about 10 km north of the city of Erbil and is closely connected to it. The area is known as Baranati.

== History ==
Following the 1991 uprisings and the establishment of the KRG, Bahirka was designated as a subdistrict within Erbil District, alongside Ankawa and Shamamik. It stayed as a subdistrict until 2024, when the Kurdistan Regional Government issued a decree which turned Bahirka from a subdistrict into a district. The district’s borders remained the same as the subdistrict.

== Refugee camp ==
Bahirka District also has a refugee camp located near the seat of the district. It was initially a transit site for Syrian refugees who fled the country. In 2014, it was repurposed for the IDPs from Nineveh Governorate during the Fall of Mosul.

== See also ==
- Erbil Governorate
- Erbil District
- Internally displaced persons in Iraq
