= Lake Felaw =

Lake in Choman District, Iraq

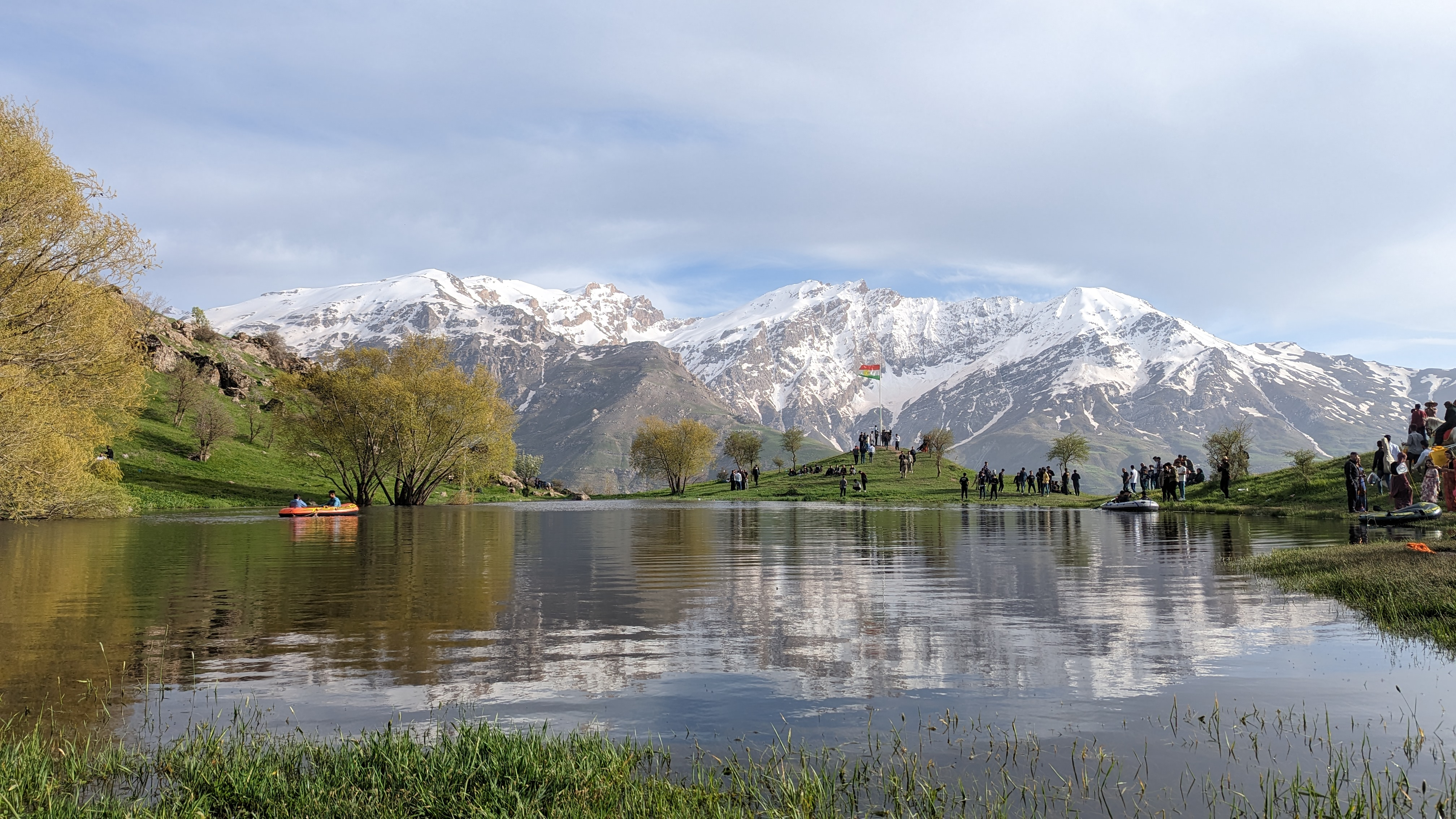
- Interactive map of Lake Felaw
- Location: Choman District, Erbil, Kurdistan Region
- Coordinates: 36°37′15.5″N 44°55′43.9″E
- Type: Lake
- Basin countries: Iraq
- Surface elevation: 3,000 m (9,800 ft; 1,600 fathoms)

Lake Felaw is situated in the Balakayati region within the Choman District, approximately 160 kilometers northeast of Erbil Governorate, in the Kurdistan Region of Iraq. It is located approximately 160 kilometers from the city center and considered a tourist attraction throughout the winter and spring seasons.

== Location ==
The lake is located north of the Jinasan tourist site, nestled between the mountains of Sikal and Hisar, part of the mountain range in the Balakayati region. Situated at an altitude of 3,000 meters above sea level, it is the highest lake in the Kurdistan Region of Iraq.
