= Sidekan =

Sidekan سیدەکان
- Subdistrict
- Nickname: Bradost
- Interactive map of Sidekan
- Location in Iraq
- Coordinates: 36.8°N 44.6°E
- Country: Iraq
- Region: Kurdistan Region
- Governorate: Erbil Governorate
- District: Soran District

Population
  - Total: Less than 15,000
- Many original inhabitants displaced due to conflict
- Demonym: Bradostian

Sidekan (Kurdish: سیدەکان ,Sîdekan) also called Bradost, is a vast subdistrict belonging to Soran District (Soran-Rawanduz) north of Erbil in Kurdistan Region, with 250 villages. The district also contains the area where the ancient Armenian city of Mahkert (Armenian: Մահկերտ, Mahkert) was. Sidekan has a population of less than 15,000. The exact number of Bradostian people estimated is more than this census but as the original inhabitants have been deported three times during the Iraqi–Kurdish conflicts in 1961, 1978, and 1988 and a lot of them have not yet returned due to the frequent bombing by the Turkish and Iranian militaries on the Kurdistan Workers Party strongholds in Zagros Mountains, and also because of the lack of renovation projects by the local authorities.

== History ==
After 1958 and the return of Mullah Mustafa Barzani from Russia, and then the outbreak of Kurdish revolution in 1961 under his leadership, Sidekan became a dangerous place to stay overall impact of some of its residents to leave them, especially the family of Sheikh Rashid Lolan and his Naqshbandi Sufi followers and the family of Mahmoud Beg and his sons. Barzani had bad relationships with both families. Firstly, they dwelled in Soran and Harir and then inside Hawler in both (Iskan) and (Azadi). In 1978, the Iraqi government issued a decision to evacuate the border areas with Turkey and Iran to prevent contact between Kurdish rebels and villagers. Accordingly, many residents of Sidekan were deported to Diana (Soran), Topzawa, Kesnezan and Degele around the city of Erbil. The rest of them were deported to Badleyan near Diana in 1984-1988 during the Iran–Iraq War. The name of Sidekan was mentioned in a Historical Islamic books in Arabic, "said Abu Abbas Qalqashandi who died in 821 Hijri wrote about Sidekan and their Kurdish princes in his Book "Sobh a'sha" as one of the countries of Eastern during Hulagu Khan's rule (from 1217 to 1265) one of them was the prince Ali Hossam Eddin Zerzari and Henesh bin Ismail, the prince of Beazgir.

=== Holy land of Muṣaṣir ===
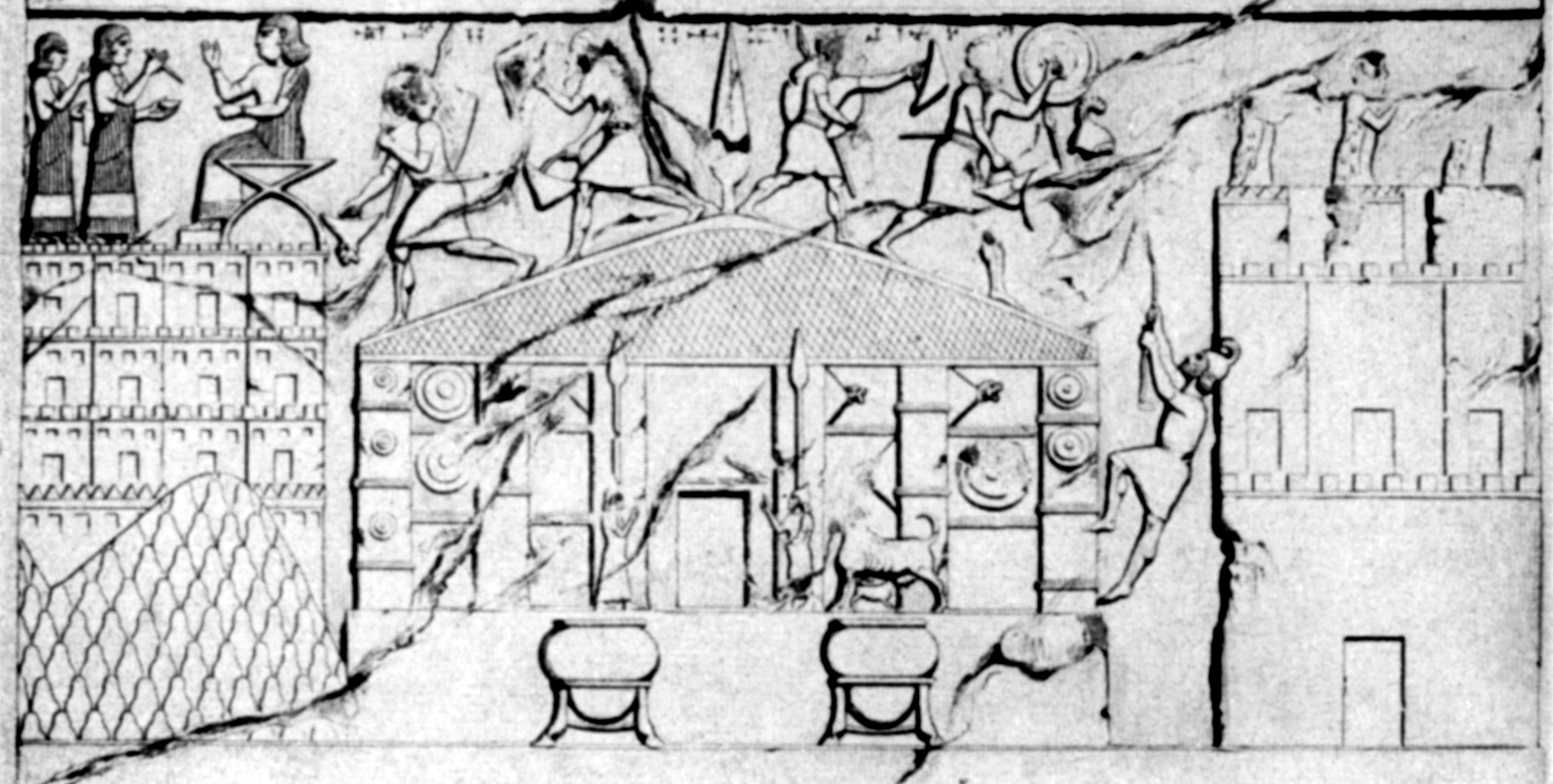
Musasir temple

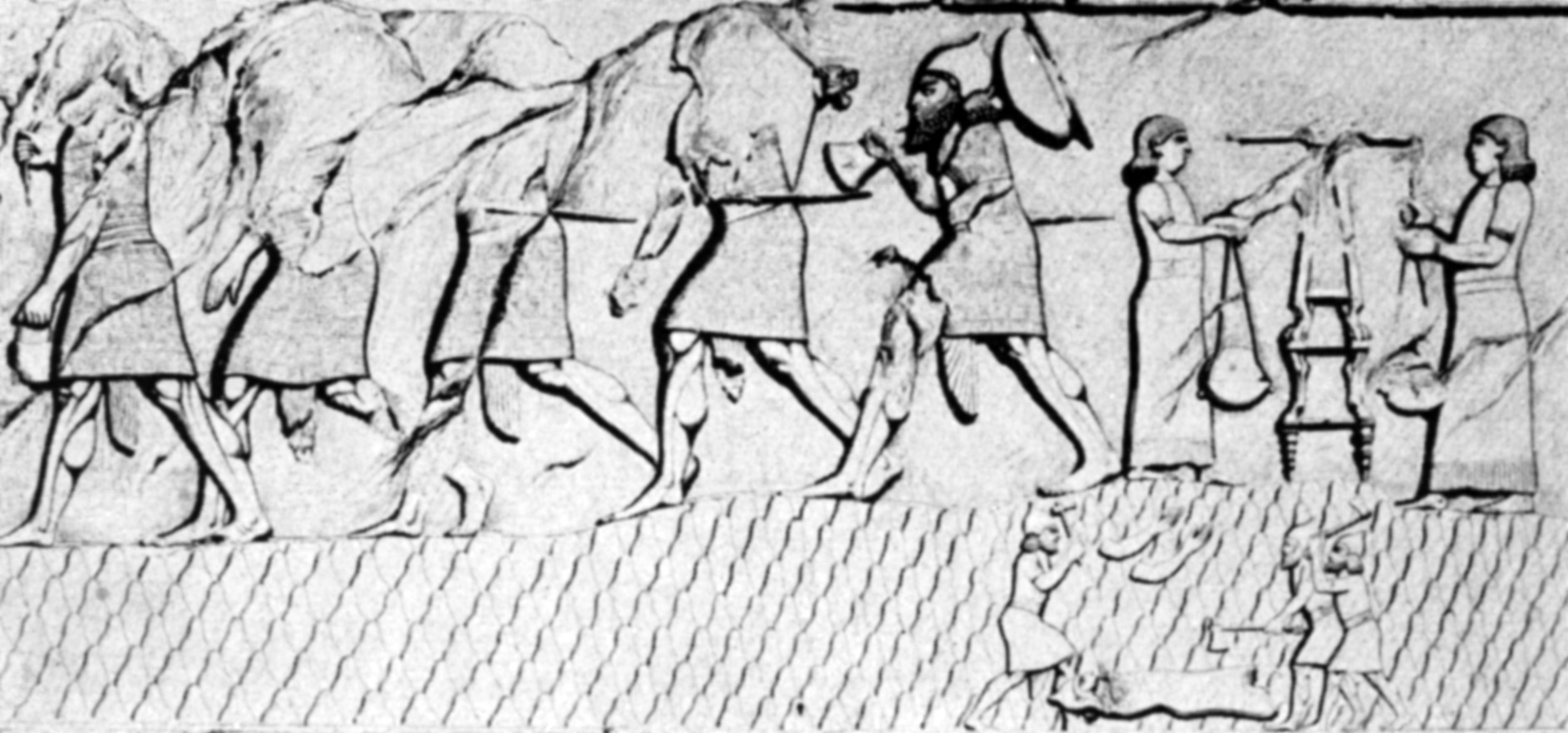
the life in Musasir

Sidkan old town was located near the village of Mucéser which was called Muṣaṣir which was an ancient Mannaean city, attested in Assyrian sources of the 9th and 8th centuries BC. It was acquired by the Urartian king Ishpuini ca. 800 BC . The city's tutelary deity was Ḫaldi. The name Musasir in Akkadian means exit of the serpent. The Musasir temple was an important Araratian temple in Musasir, The Temple at Musasir appears in an Assyrian bas-relief which adorned the palace of King Sargon II at Khorsapat, to commemorate his victory over "the seven kings of Ararat" in 714 BC. During the early 1850s, the British Assyrian Excavation Fund entered the field under William Kennett Loftus and many antiquities and accurate drawings of wall sculptures were apportioned between the British Museum and the Louvre. However, a convoy of antiquities was attacked by Arab robbers while being shipped down the Tigris River, and today lies buried somewhere in the bed of that river.

=== Ardini Kingdom ===
Ardini was one of the city of ancient Musasir who mentioned in Keleshin stele, the location of this city is now called (Hérdeni) not too far from Mucéser five km from Sidekan town.

=== Kéleshin Stele ===
Kéle shin meaning "Green stone" in Kurdish is a mountain pass located on the Iranian border, Bradost area north of Iraqi Kurdistan some 80 km south-west of Lake Urmia. The Kélashin Stele (also Kélishin Stele) found in Kélashin pass, bears an important Urartian-Assyrian bilingual text dating to ca. 800 BC, first described by Friedrich Eduard Schulz in 1827. Part of Schulz's notes were lost when he was killed by local brigands, and later expeditions were either prevented by weather conditions or brigands, so that a copy (latex squeeze) of the inscription could only be made in 1951 by G. Cameron, and again in 1976 by an Italian party under heavy military protection. The inscription describes the acquisition of the city of Musasir (Ardini) by the Urartian king Ishpuini the stele is now kept in the museum of Urmia city since 1984. also there are a small stele found in Topzawa village, close to Sidekan town called Topzawa stele. it kept in Erbil museum.

=== Topzawa stele ===
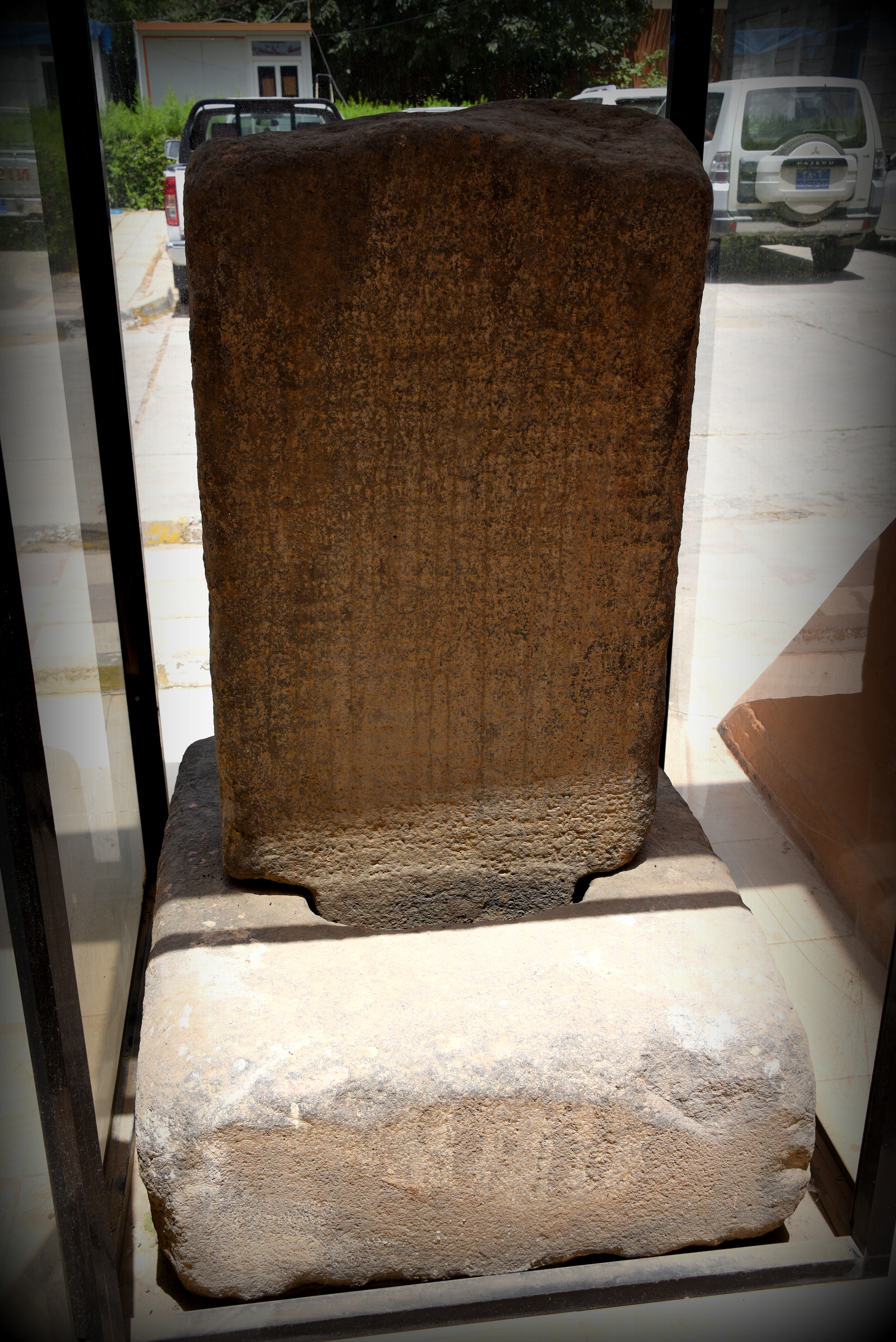
Topzawa Stele or Topzawa Rock. It describes Urartian clashes with Assyrians. The stele belonged to the kingdom of Musasir at Sidekan village, Erbil Governorate, Iraq Erbil Civilization Museum, Iraqi Kurdistan

From Topzawa (Topzawä), 25 km is from Kéleshin, a bilingual Stele of King Rusa I urartu. It is badly preserved. The text tells how Urzana appeared in front of Musasir Rusa, perhaps, as Russell suggested, to seek for help against the Assyrians. Rusa attacked the Assyrians and Urzana sat on the throne of his fathers. Musasir were offered to the gods of sacrifice. At the end of the inscription are the one who destroys, threatened the usual punishment of the gods. Most researchers assume that Musasir was in the vicinity of Topzawa

== Clans and tribes ==
Sidekan is inhabited by the clan of Bradost or Biradost ( برادوست) which has four main branches:

- Begzade in the villages of (Mucéser, or Mudjesir :old Muṣaṣir), Lolan and in Dashti-Berazgir.
- Khakurki in Khakurk (Hakurk) area close to Shamdinan district with Turkish border.
- Piresni in Sidekan town, zerza valley and outlying areas.
- Rewendok including Shekhzade branch, in Dashti Hért who live as Semi-Nomade and their summer residences are in Kéle Shin Pass close to Oshnavieh inside Iran border

There is also a tribe of Muhacir who are originally immigrants came from Turkey and Iranian Kurdistan with Sheikh Taha Nehri and Simko Shikak during Shemdinan-Chariq unrest in 1884 and 1915

== Geographic details ==
=== Mountains ===
Bradost is a mountainous area characterized by high mountains. The most famous one is Helgurd (the peak of Hasarost) in the south east. Other mountains include Goshine, Bizeen, Berbizeen, Shekiw, Déwane, Siako, Hesenbeg, Bolé, Rebenok, Qelender, Awedel Kéw, xréne.

=== Rivers ===
- Haji beg, originate from Khakurk and pour out into upper Zab in the village of Rézan (Barzan area)
- Gader rise from Lolan area and crosses into Deshti-Shno and Silduz (Neghede) and pour out into the Lake of Urumia (Iran)
- Zena thru Letan valley into Balekyan branch and then to Zab (in Khelan village).

=== Lakes ===
There are some Volcanic lake located in the highlands close to Kileshin passage, locally called (bérm) which mean small lakelet. The famous one is (Bérm of Dindaran). in the graphics of Musasir (assyrian inscriptions) this lake is shown up.

=== Gallery ===
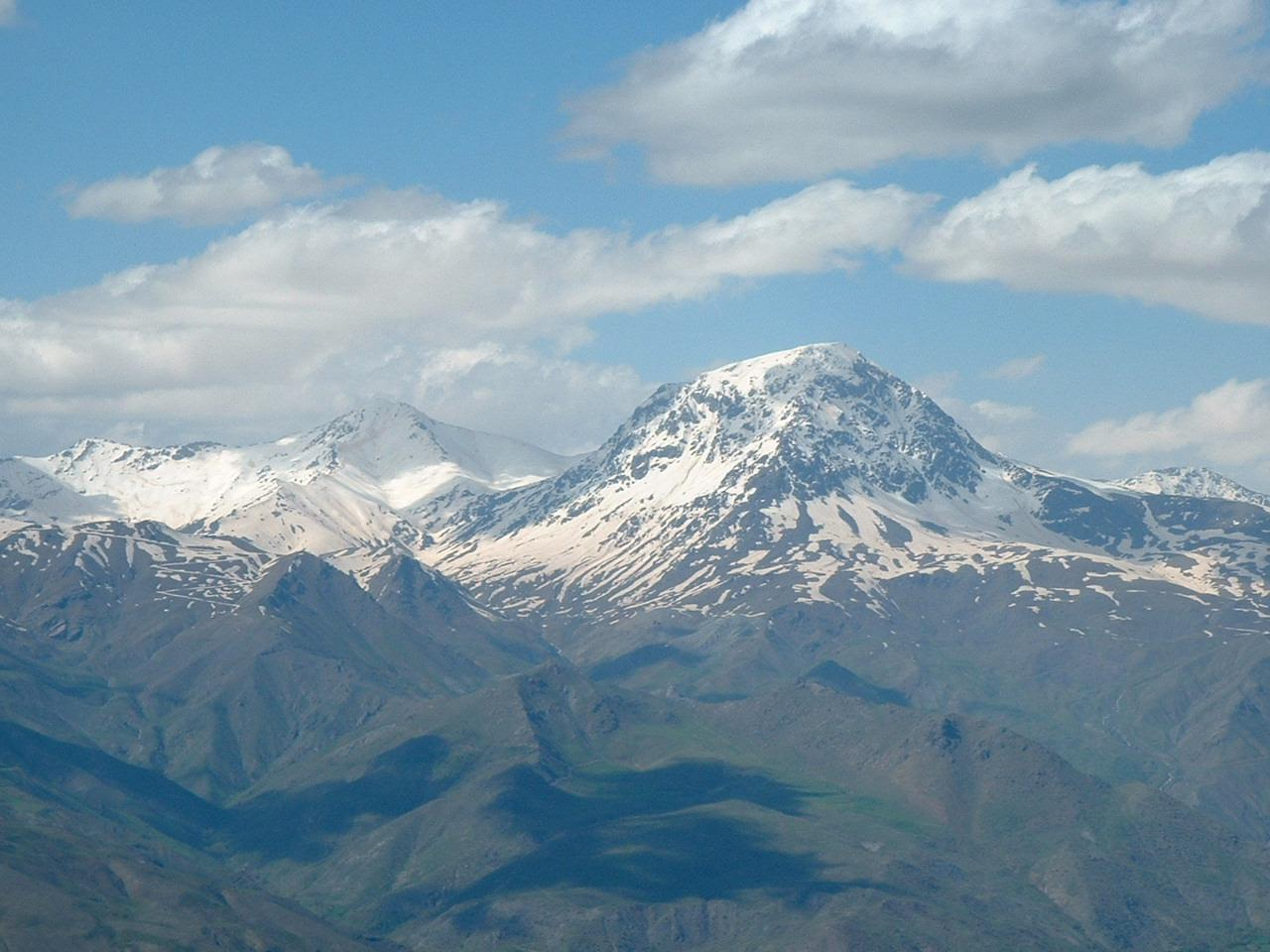
Helgurd peak

Nomadic Kurdish Rewendi Woman

ruins of Saddam palace on Hasanbeg mount.

Wild goat

Nomadic Rewendi Kurdish tribesmen

== See also ==
- Erbil
- Baradostian culture
- Emirate of Bradost
- Sidekan clashes (2020)
- August 2023 Turkish airstrikes in Iraq
