= Galala, Iraq =

Town in the Erbil Governorate, Kurdistan Region, Iraq

Galala گەڵاڵە
- Town
- Interactive map of Galala
- Location within Iraqi Kurdistan
- Country: Iraq
- Region: Kurdistan Region
- Governorate: Erbil Governorate

Galala (Kurdish: گەڵاڵە, Gelale) is a small town in Kurdistan Region in northern Iraq, about 9 km west of Choman. It is populated by Kurds.
