= August 2023 Turkish airstrikes in Iraq =

Turkish Airstrikes in Iraq
- Part of Kurdish-Turkish conflict (1978-present)
- Type: Drone strikes
- Location: Sidekan, Kurdistan Region, Iraq
- Planned by: Turkish Armed Forces
- Target: Kurdistan Workers’ Party
- Date: August 24, 2023
- Casualties: 7 PKK insurgents killed (including two medical personnel)

On August 24 2023, two Turkish drone strikes in Iraqi Kurdistan killed seven PKK insurgents, this came at a time of political manoeuvres, when the Turkish foreign minister met with top Kurdish officials in Erbil.

This coincided with a political offensive by Turkey, who urged Iraq to recognise the PKK as a terrorist organisation.

== Background ==
The Sidekan subdistrict is home to PKK based, from where the PKK insurgents coordinate and carry out ambushes on Turkish troops, some of which have dealt the Turkish armed forces somewhat considerable casualties.

As a response, the Turkish army have been conducting air strikes, mainly with drones in Iraq to eliminate PKK pockets, which Iraq condemned.

The Kurdish and Iraqi authorities have been continuously accused of not doing enough to curb the PKK insurgency, leading to Turkish cross-border action.

== Attacks ==
Two drone attacks were carried out, with the first one striking a vehicle killing a PKK official and two other insurgents. Kurdish counterterrorism forces confirmed this.

Just a few hours later, another drone strike killed another 4 insurgents, including two medical personnel. There were no reports of Turkish casualties.

== Aftermath ==
The Turkish foreign minister, Hakan Fidan, had met and urged both Iraqi and Kurdish officials to recognise the Kurdistan Workers' Party as a terrorist organisation.

When meeting with the prime minister of the Iraqi Kurdistan region, Masrour Barzani, he stated "We have settled this question in Turkey once and for all. Now the PKK is hiding in Iraqi territory. We are working with Baghdad and Arbil to protect Iraq from the PKK.”
