= Soran District =

Administrative Division Of The Kurdistan Region

Soran (Kurdish: قەزای سۆران, Arabic: قضاء سوران) is a district and an independent administration of the Erbil Governorate, Kurdistan Region, in Iraq, bordering Iran and Turkey. Its main city is Soran.

Soran District is similar to a county, and the seat of government is in Diana, having previously been in Rawandiz.

== Sub-districts ==
There were five sub-districts in Soran, being Mergasur, Diyana, Khalifan, Rawandiz and Sidekan.

Recently, however, Rawandiz became a separate district.
