= Khabat District =

Khabat District قەزای خەبات
- District
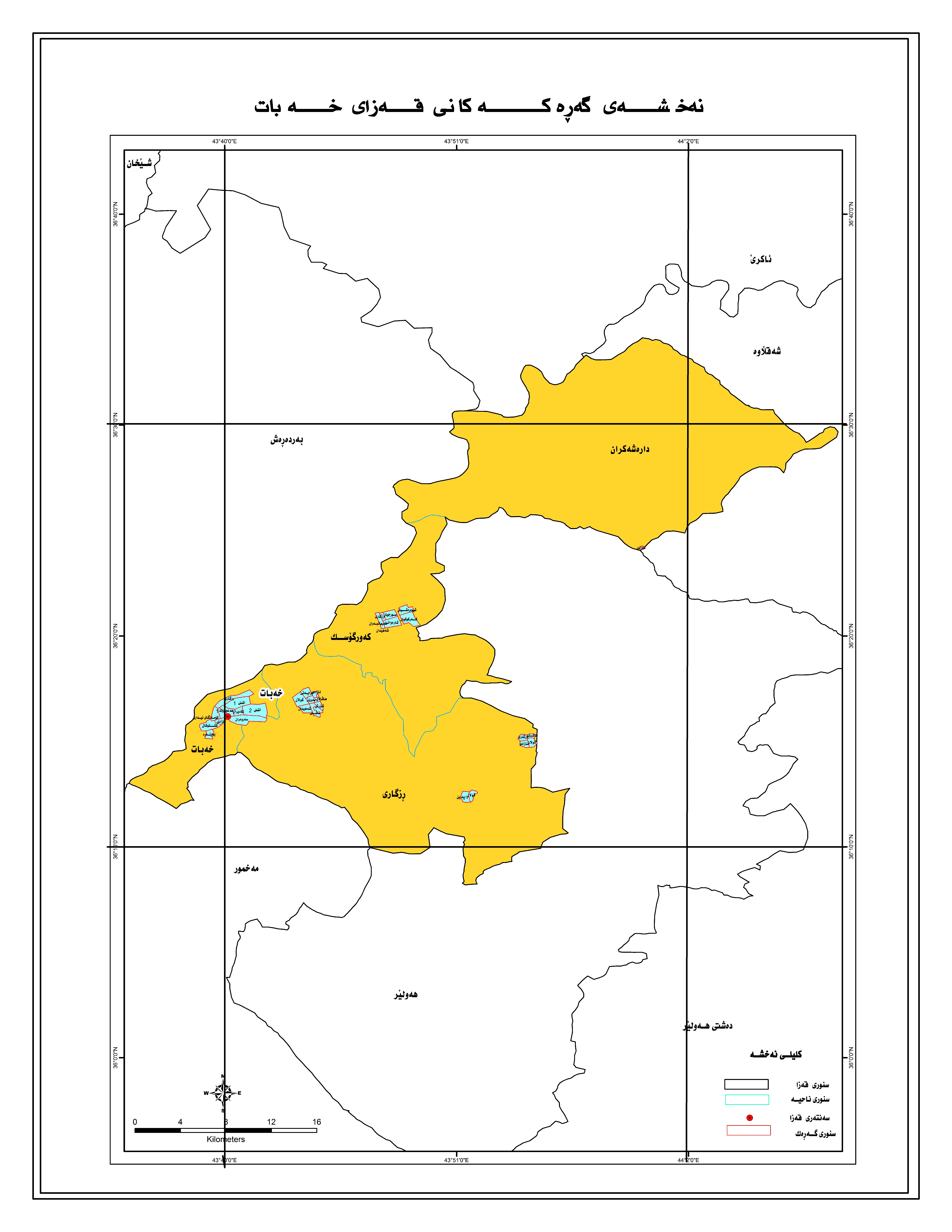
- Map of the district

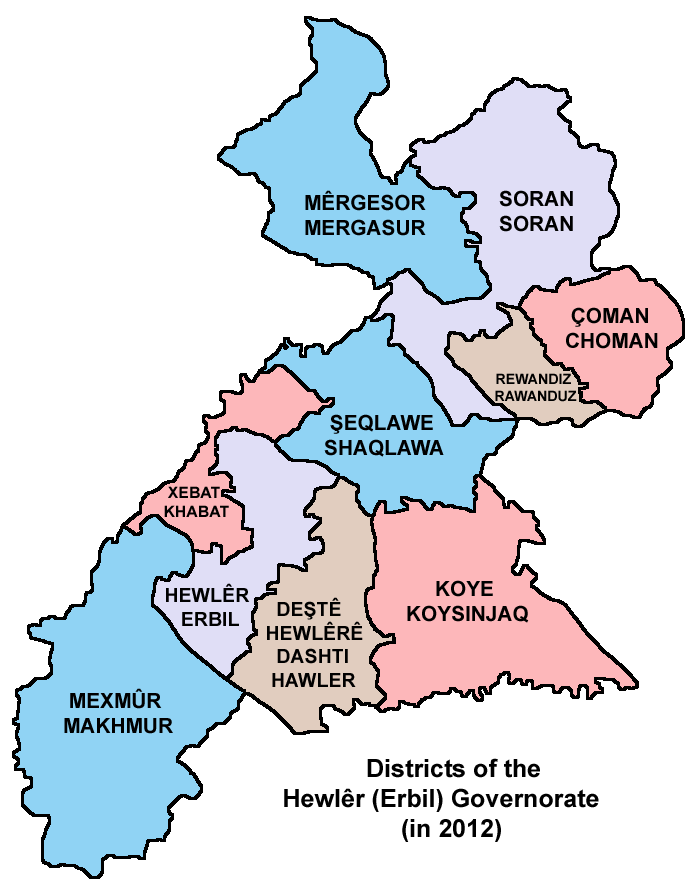
- Location of Khabat District (in pink) among the districts of Erbil Governorate, 2012

- Location in Iraq
- Coordinates: 36.270121°N 43.672032°E
- Country: Iraq
- Autonomous region: Kurdistan
- Governorate: Erbil Governorate
- Capital: Kabat
- Time zone: UTC+3 (AST)

Khabat District (Sorani Kurdish: قەزای خەبات), also spelled Kabat or Qezayê Xebat in Kurdish, is a district located in the western part of Erbil Governorate, in Iraq. The administrative centre of the district is Khabat.

The district comprises three sub-districts: Rizgarî (ڕزگاری، خەبات), Kewrgosk, and Dareşekran, along with a total of 64 villages.

Khabat lies approximately 37 km west of the city of Erbil, situated on the main road connecting Erbil and Mosul.

== Tribal conflicts and disputes ==
Khabat District has witnessed numerous tribal and familial conflicts in recent years, largely fueled by disputes over land ownership, water resources, and intertribal rivalries. These incidents underscore the challenges of integrating traditional tribal authority within the formal governance structure of the Kurdistan Region.

In May 2022, a violent family feud occurred in the village of Kawrraban. Two brothers and their sons engaged in a shootout over contested agricultural land. The confrontation resulted in five deaths and two injuries. According to local police, one family had previously left the village but returned to reclaim the land, reigniting the conflict.

In July 2025, multiple tribal confrontations occurred across the district. A raid by Kurdish security forces on the home of Khurshid Harki, a prominent leader of the Herki (also spelled Harki) tribe in Khabat, led to significant unrest. Supporters of the tribe overturned a security vehicle and exchanged gunfire with law enforcement. One man, aged 35, was killed. Tribal leaders claimed the conflict stemmed from a longstanding land ownership dispute with the rival Goran tribe. The disputed land had allegedly been returned to the Herki tribe by court order, but the Goran tribe reportedly refused to vacate.

Around the same time, another conflict broke out in the village of Qarahanjir, related to irrigation rights and water access. Herki tribesmen resisted attempts by the Zeravani paramilitary forces to arrest individuals linked to the earlier land dispute. A violent clash followed, involving stones, gunfire, and burning roadblocks. The incident resulted in the death of one tribesman and injuries to at least five Zeravani officers.

By July 9, 2025, a second security convoy had been deployed to Khabat from Erbil to deter further escalation. Negotiations were underway between tribal leaders and regional authorities, but tensions remained high due to the unresolved nature of the underlying land and water disputes.
