= Kasnazan, Iraq =

Kasnazan کەسنەزان
- Town
- Interactive map of Kasnazan
- Location of Kasnazan in the Kurdistan Region Kasnazan (Iraqi Kurdistan)
- Coordinates: 36°12′12″N 44°07′47″E
- Country: Iraq
- Region: Kurdistan Region
- Governorate: Erbil Governorate

Kasnazan (Kurdish: Kesnezan / کەسنەزان) is a town located in west Erbil Governorate in Kurdistan Region, Iraq. The town is populated by Kurds; with 15% of Kasnazan's population refugees from Syrian Kurdistan. It is located 12 kilometres (7.5 mi) from Erbil. Kasnazan features a hospital, football fields and mosques. The Population Of kasnazan According to the Population Census Is approximately 110,000-130,000

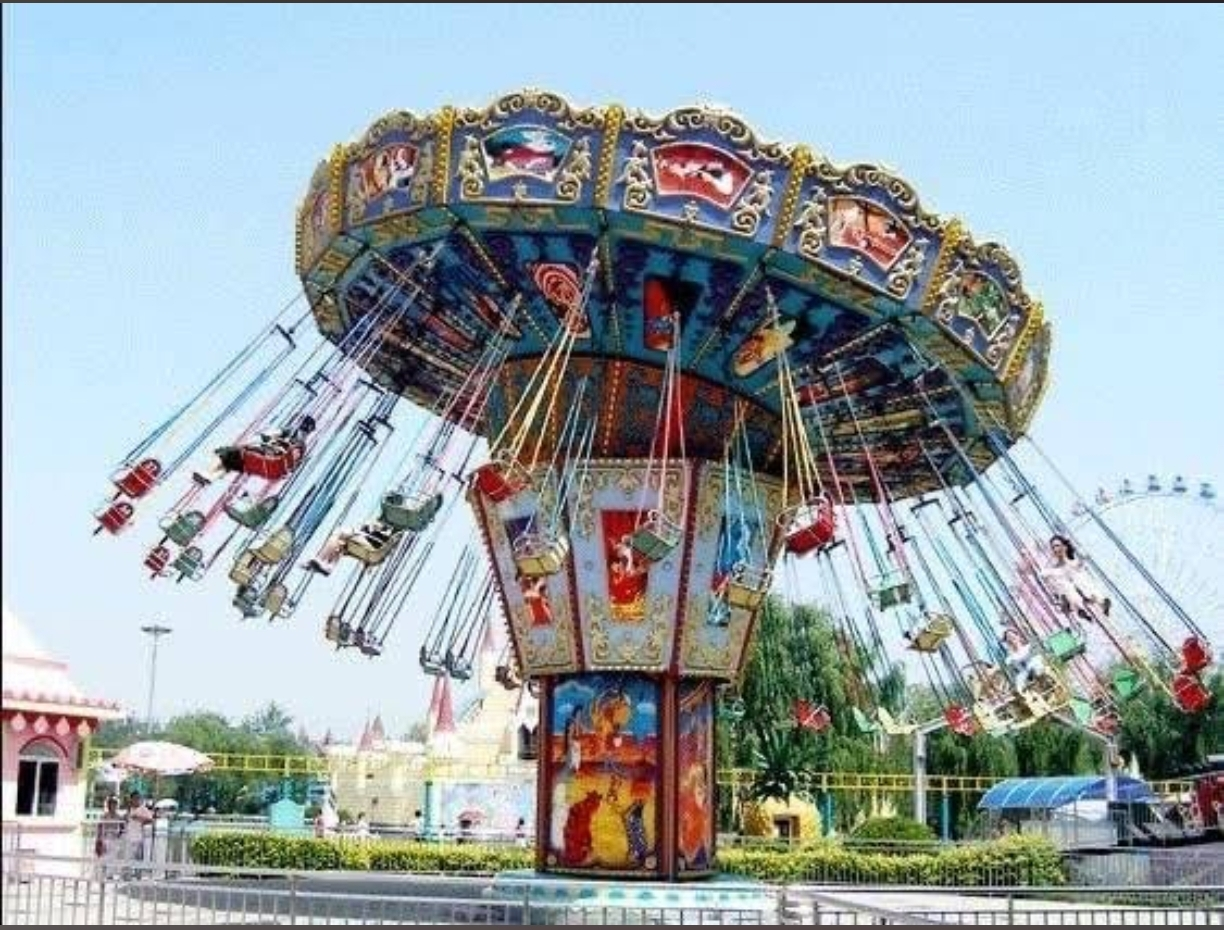
One of the Rides In The Majdi Land Amusement Park in kasnazan
