= Erbil District =

Erbil District قەزای ھەولێر
- District
- Interactive map of Erbil District
- Country: Iraq
- Autonomous region: Kurdistan Region
- Governorate: Erbil Governorate
- Seat: Erbil
- Time zone: UTC+3 (AST)

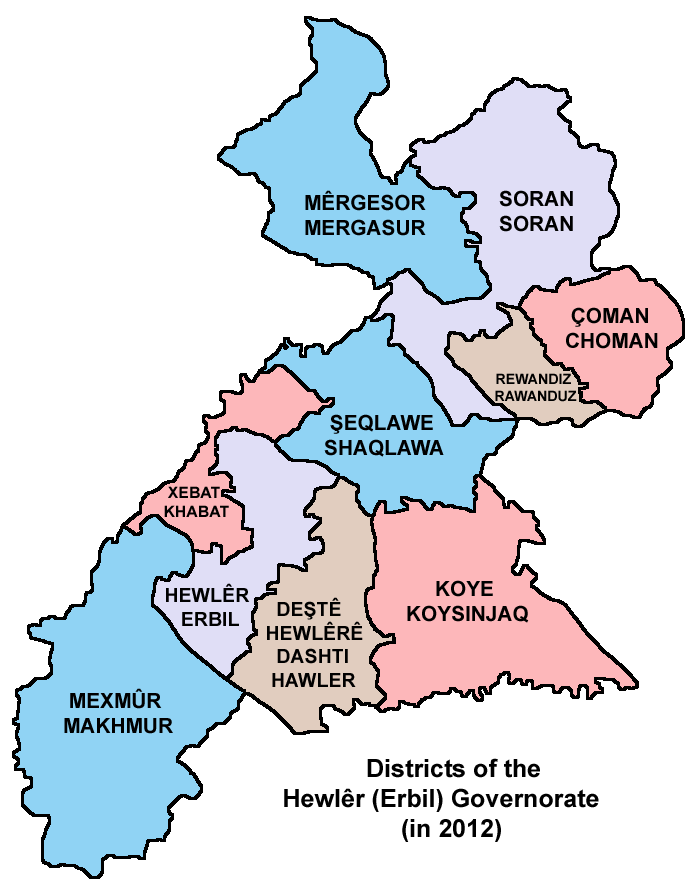
Districts of the Arbil Governorate (in 2012) according to Kurdistan Region Statistics Office web site.

Erbil District (Kurdish: قەزای ھەولێر, romanized: Qezay Hewlêr, Arabic: قضاء أربيل) is a district of the Erbil Governorate in Iraq. It contains three sub-districts, Ankawa, Behirke and Shamamek, and 379 villages. The District of Erbil is centered on the city of Erbil.
