= Khalifan, Iraq =

Khalifan خەلیفان
- Town
- Interactive map of Khalifan
- Location within Iraqi Kurdistan Location within Iraq
- Country: Iraq
- Autonomous region: Kurdistan
- Governorate: Erbil Governorate
- District: Rawanduz District
- Sub-district: Khalifan Sub-District
- Time zone: UTC+3:00 (UTC)
- Postal code: 44007

Khalifan (Kurdish: خەلیفان, romanized: Xelîfan), is a town and sub-district located in Erbil Province, Kurdistan Region in Iraq, near Rawandiz. It is located 80 km northeast of Erbil and the majority of its population are Kurds.

The town's most famous places are the Geli Ali Beg Waterfall and Korek Mountain. Islam is the majority religion in Khalifan.

== Tourism ==
=== Geli Ali Beg Waterfall ===
The Geli Ali Beg waterfall is located 106 km away from Erbil, and is 10-15 km away from Khalifan. It is considered one of the most popular tourist destinations in the Kurdistan Region and Iraq. Situated between Korek Mountain and Bradost Mountain, the waterfall is 12 km long, and is 800 meters above sea level. The temperature reaches 31°C in the summer, and can drop down to -10°C in winter. There are two rivers which form this waterfall, one coming from the Alana Valley, and the other in Rawanduz. Despite its large size, many smaller waterfalls are also in the area. This waterfall has become a popular tourist destination, attracting many visitors, especially from the central and southern regions of Iraq in the summer season. The waterfall is featured on the obverse side of the 5,000 IQD note, alongside Al-Ukhether Fortress.

=== Bekhal Waterfall ===
The Bekhal Waterfall is located 130km away from Erbil, and 7km from Rawandaz. The waterfall's source is in mountain springs, which then cascade down limestone stone formations. The waterfall is surrounded by steep cliffs and lush greenery, making the site a popular summer destination for its cool air and flowing water.

== Resources ==
- مێژۆی خەلیفان
- رێگری‌ له‌ شوێنه‌واری‌ هه‌رێم ده‌كرێت لێكۆڵینه‌وه‌ له‌ زێڕە دۆزراوه‌كه‌ی‌ خه‌لیفان بكات
- خەلیفان (raprsi.com)
- پارێزگای هەولێر
- جوگرافیای خەلیفان
