= Soran, Iraq =

Coordinates: 36.653°N 44.543°E

Soran
- City
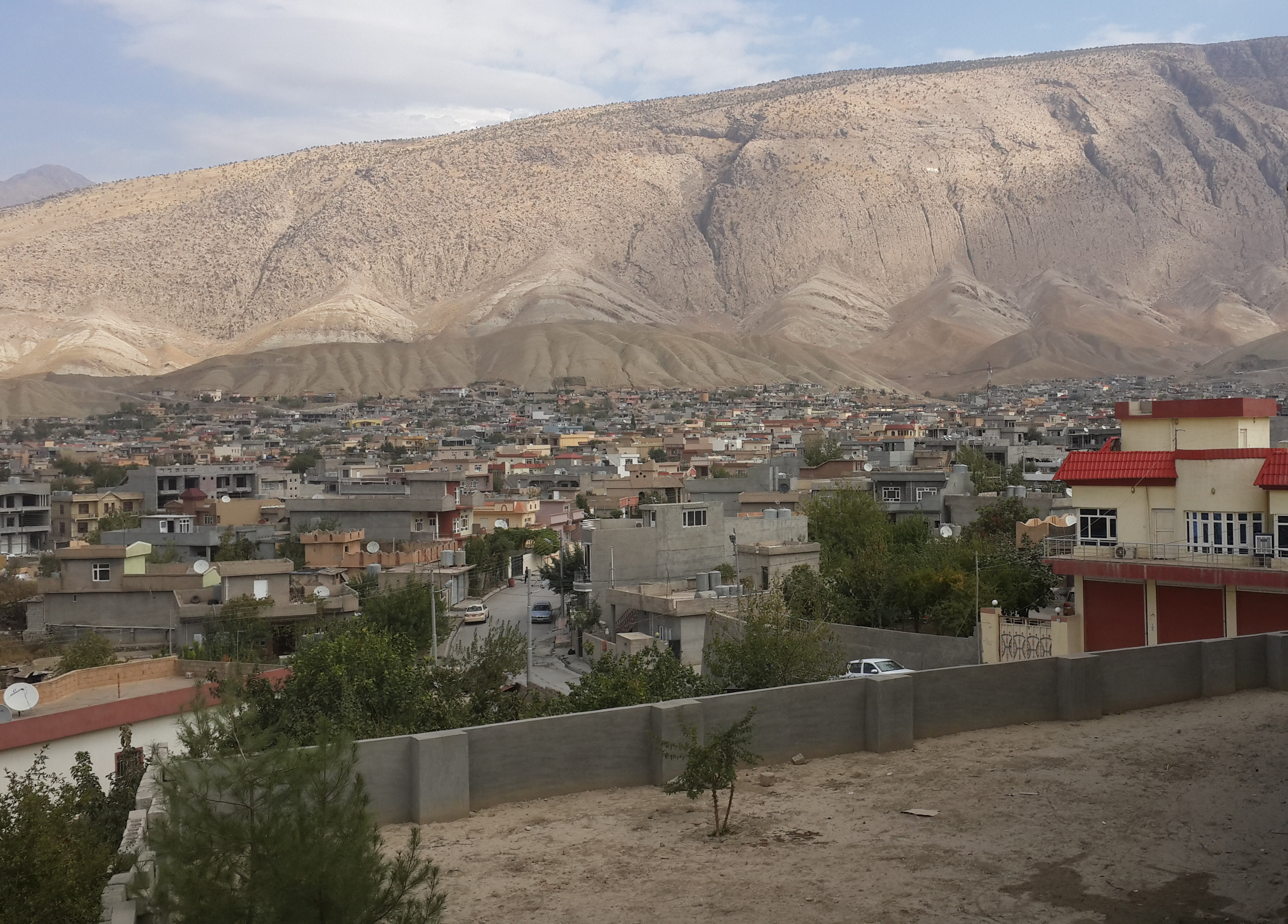
- Interactive map of Soran
- Country: Iraq
- Autonomous region: Kurdistan Region
- Province: Erbil Province
- Elevation: 680 m (2,230 ft)

Population (2018)
  - Total: 64,177

Soran (Kurdish: سۆران ,Soran, Classical Syriac: ܕܐܝܢܐ) is a city in Erbil Governorate, and the administrative centre of Soran District in Kurdistan Region, Iraq. Soran is one of the largest cities in Kurdistan Region with a population of about 64,177 people.

== History ==
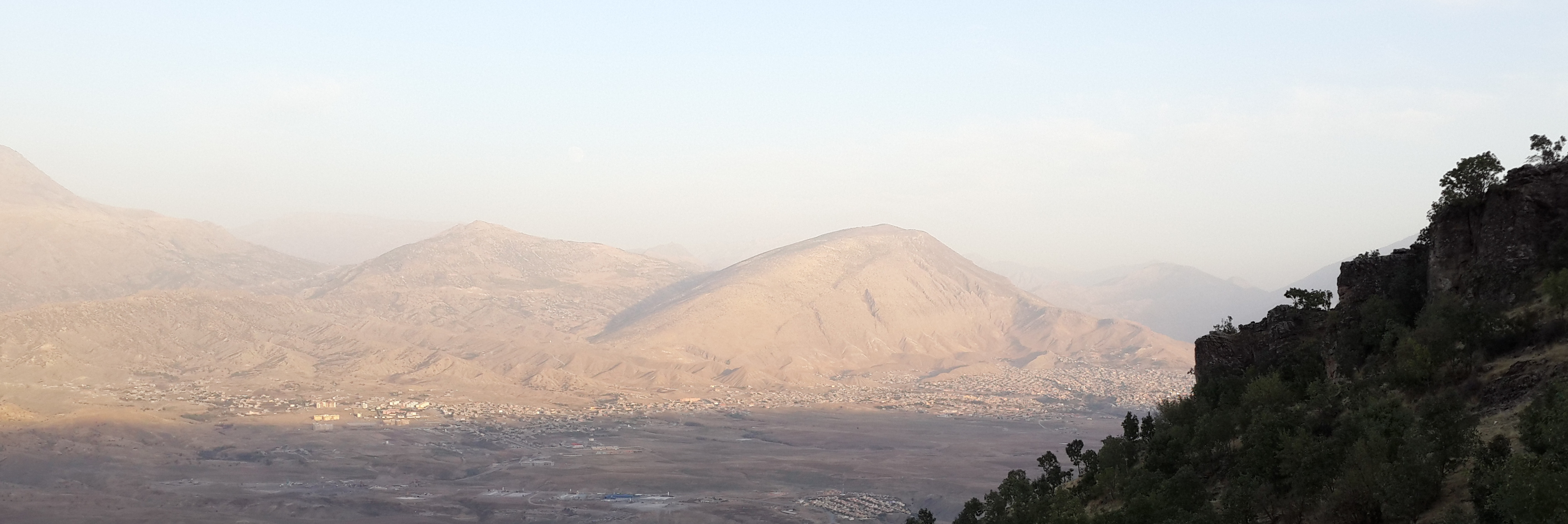
Soran City as seen from Bradost Mt.

The city and district of Soran or Suran is named after the Sorani Kurds who inhabit the same geographical region. Surani people are first attested during the rule of the Urartian Empire to have lived in modern Soran district stretching up to the areas around lake Urmia in Iran. Sorani Kurds have given their name to the Sorani Dialect as well, which is one of the three branches of Kurdish language.

Cuneiform texts spanning the Early Bronze Age to the early Iron Age suggest the Soran district formed the territorial core of the Hurro-Urartian kingdom of Musasir (Ardini), famed as home to the trans-regional cult center of the Hurrian storm-god Haldi. The Assyrian king Sargon II in 714 BC during his renowned Eighth Campaign conquered Soran, which he refers to it as Sarun, and sacked the Kurdish fire temple and its treasury. Archaeological reconnaissance and excavations have revealed evidence for human occupation over the long duration of occupations with clear evidence of the region’s prosperity in the later Bronze and early Iron Age.

The Muslim army led by Ubadah ibn al-Samit conquered Soran and the surrounding areas in 642 (22 A.H.), after they defeated the Kurdish forces in Mosul and Erbil plains. The Muslim Empire gave Soran and Rawanduz area the name 'al-Hanana'.

In the Medieval era Soran was at the heart of the Soran Emirate which was established by the Soran Dynasty, it lasted until late 19th century. Its most famous ruler was Muhammad Pasha of Rawanduz.

In the 1920s a settlement in Soran was established by the British to settle Assyrian Christian refugees as part of the Assyrian settlement scheme in northern Iraq known as the Z plan, and the settlement came to be known as Diana.

The former Iraqi Baathist regime during Anfal Campaign and the Arabization process changed the city's name to Diana and later to Qadha Al Siddiq (District of Saddiq), after the Kurdish uprising in 1991 its name was changed back to Soran.

== Tourist areas ==
Soran city is a very beautiful area. Due to its mountainous nature, it has many tourist attractions, including:

- Jondian
- Bekhal Waterfall
- Geli Ali Beg Waterfall
- Hasan Beg
- Mustafa Beg
- Sakran

== Government ==
The current sub-governor of the Soran district is Halgurd Sheikh Najib. He was appointed by the governor of Erbil.

== Climate ==
Soran has a Mediterranean climate (Csa) with very hot, dry summers, and cool to cold, damp, humid winters.

Climate data for Soran
Month	Jan	Feb	Mar	Apr	May	Jun	Jul	Aug	Sep	Oct	Nov	Dec	Year
Mean daily maximum °C (°F)	9.7 (49.5)	11.0 (51.8)	15.3 (59.5)	21.2 (70.2)	28.3 (82.9)	35.0 (95.0)	39.0 (102.2)	39.2 (102.6)	35.2 (95.4)	28.3 (82.9)	18.7 (65.7)	11.6 (52.9)	24.4 (75.9)
Mean daily minimum °C (°F)	0.3 (32.5)	1.1 (34.0)	4.7 (40.5)	9.5 (49.1)	14.7 (58.5)	20.1 (68.2)	23.7 (74.7)	23.5 (74.3)	19.0 (66.2)	13.5 (56.3)	7.4 (45.3)	2.2 (36.0)	11.6 (53.0)
Average precipitation mm (inches)	144 (5.7)	164 (6.5)	135 (5.3)	96 (3.8)	40 (1.6)	1 (0.0)	0 (0)	0 (0)	1 (0.0)	12 (0.5)	76 (3.0)	104 (4.1)	773 (30.5)

== See also ==
- Kurdistan (cultural area)
- Kurdistan Region (in Iraq)
