= Erbil Governorate =

Governorate of the Kurdistan Region, Iraq

Erbil Governorate Kurdish: پارێزگای ھەولێر Arabic: محافظة أربيل
- Governorate
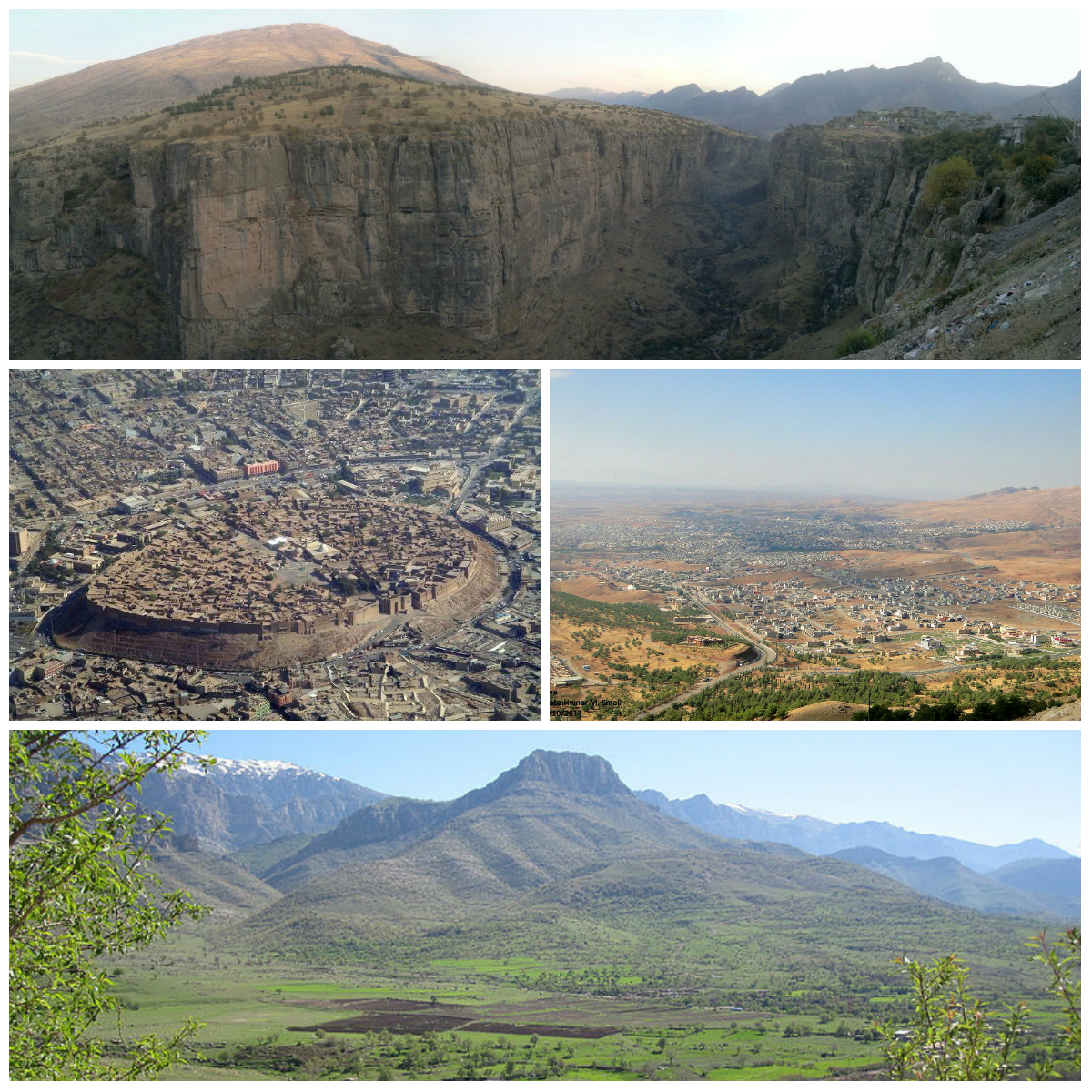
- Clockwise, from top: Canyon in Rawandiz, Koy Sanjaq, Shaqlawa and Citadel of Erbil

- Location of the Erbil Governorate (red) – in Iraq (red, beige & light grey) – in the Kurdistan Region (red & beige)

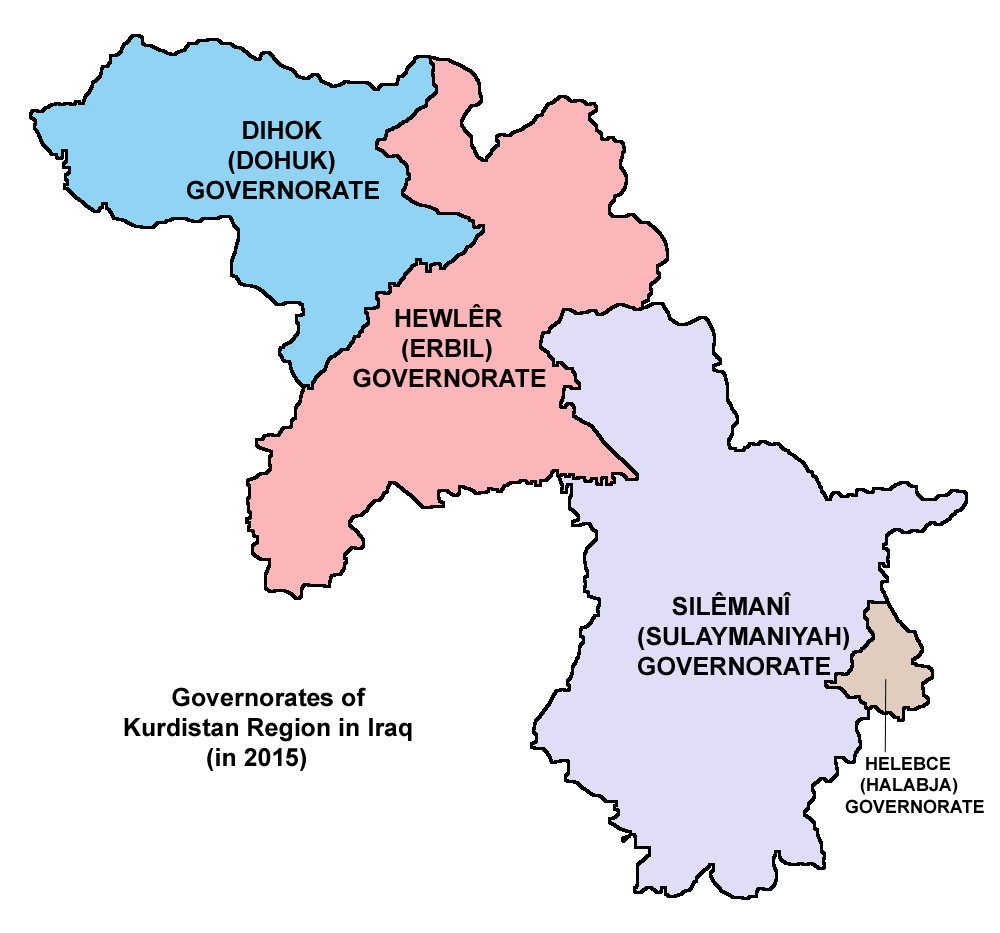
- Erbil Governorate within Kurdistan Region
- Coordinates: 36°11′N 44°2′E
- Country: Iraq
- Federal region: Kurdistan Region
- Capital: Erbil
- Governor: Omed Khoshnaw

Area
  - Total: 14,872 km^{2} (5,742 sq mi)

Population (2024 census)
  - Total: 2,517,534
  - Density: 169.28/km^{2} (438.43/sq mi)
- ISO 3166 code: IQ-AR
- HDI (2024): 0.751 high · 1st of 18
- Website: www.hawlergov.org

Erbil Governorate (Kurdish: پارێزگای ھەولێر, romanized: Parêzgeha Hewlêr; Arabic: محافظة أربيل, romanized: Muḥāfaẓat Arbīl) is a governorate of Iraq in the semi-autonomous Kurdistan Region. Its administrative centre is Erbil, which is its most important city. Erbil is also the most populated and one of the oldest continuously inhabited cities in the world, with the citadel being recognized as a UNESCO World Heritage Site.

== Government ==
- Omid Khoshnaw, Governor of Erbil
- Hemin Ali Faki, Deputy Governor of Erbil
- Dr Ali Rashid, Provincial Council Chairman of Erbil

== Demographics ==
Population development
Year	Population
1977	541,500
1987	770,439
1997	1,095,992
2009	1,532,081
2024	2,517,534

== Districts ==
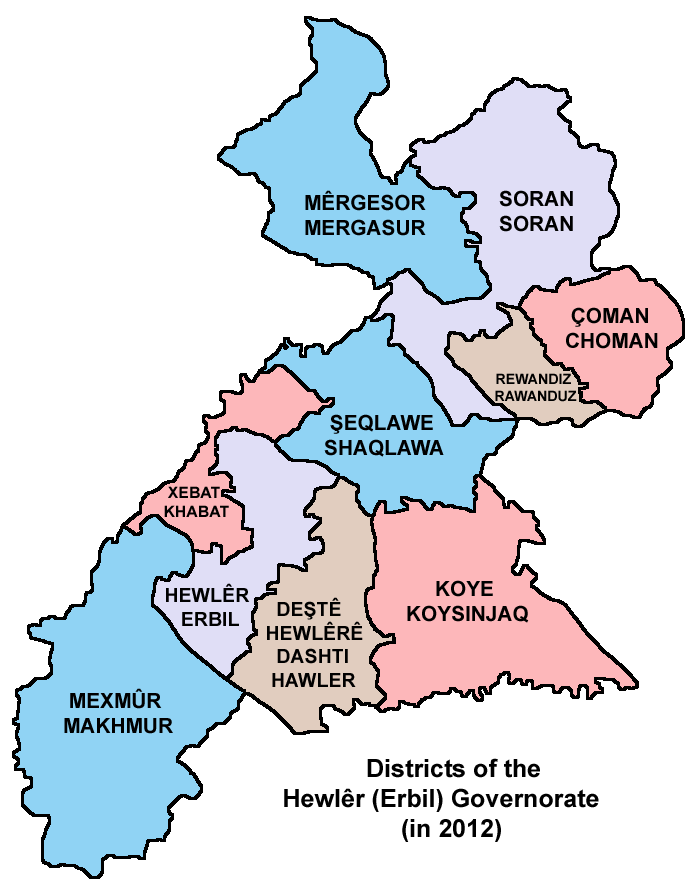
Districts of the Erbil Governorate

District	Population (2009)	Number of households
Erbil (Hewlêr)	792,981	152,899
Deştî Hewlêr	186,346	34,264
Mexmûr (disputed)	173,801	30,678
Soran	154,945	27,707
Şeqlawe	124,628	23,420
Koye	95,246	18,727
Xebat	93,442	16,015
Mêrgesor (partially disputed)	44,661	9,711
Çoman	23,730	4,749
Rewandiz	21,280	4,235
Total	1,713,461	322,719

== Cities and towns ==
English Name	Kurdish Name
Erbil (Hewlêr)	هەولێر
Soran	سۆران
Koye	کۆیە
Shaqlawa	شەقڵاوە
Rawandiz	ڕەواندز
Khabat	خەبات
Makhmur	مەخموور
Ankawa	عەنکاوە
Bnaslawa	بنەسڵاوە
Choman	چۆمان
Mergasor	مێرگەسۆر
Khalifan	خەلیفان
Harir	هەریر
Sidekan	سیدەکان
Pirmam (Salahaddin)	پیرمام
Kasnazan	کەسنەزان
Bahirka	بەحرکە
Shawes	شاوێس
Qasre	قەسرێ
Piran	پیران

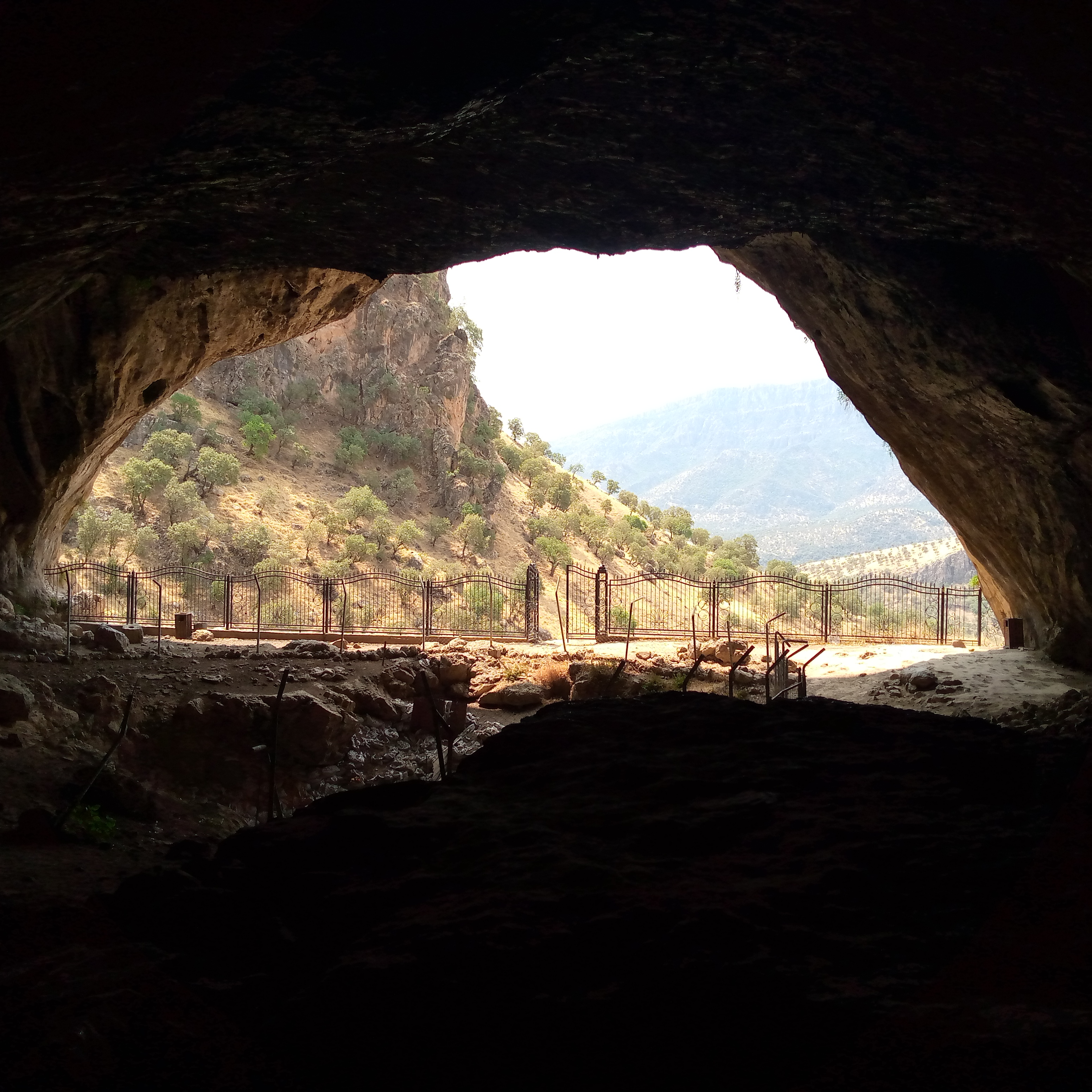
Shanidar Cave

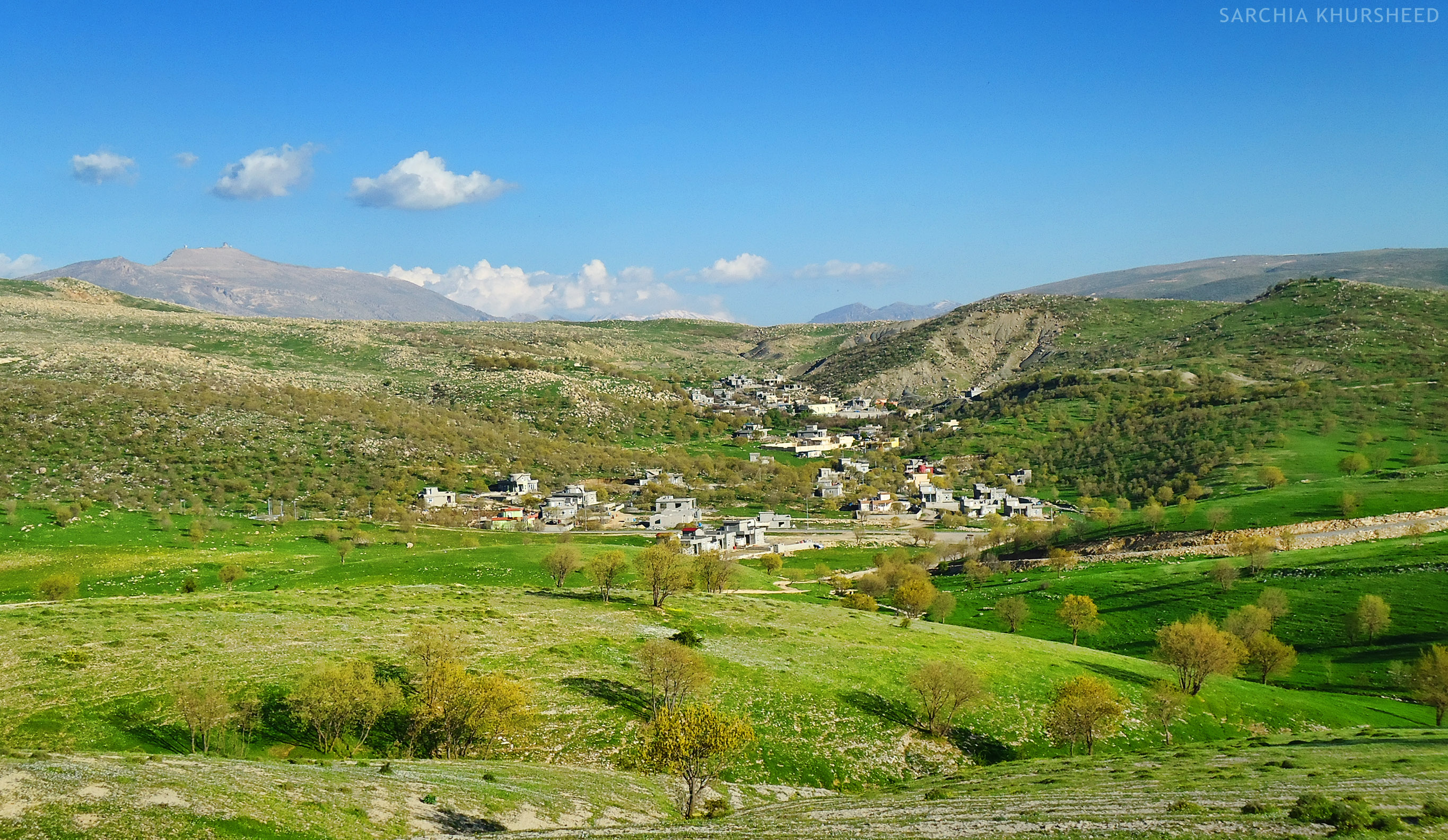
Benoke village

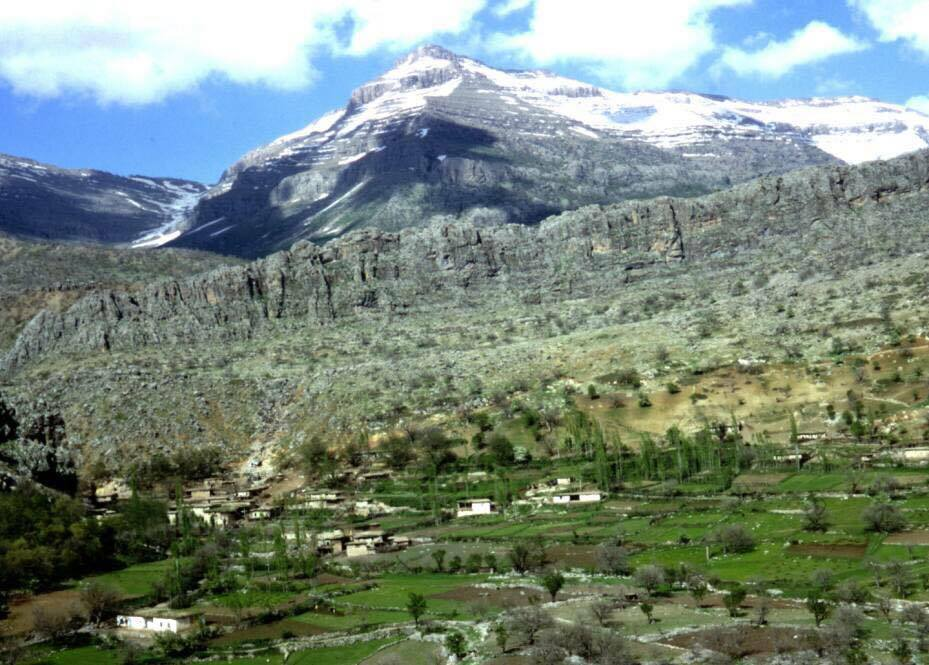
Pêndro in 1968

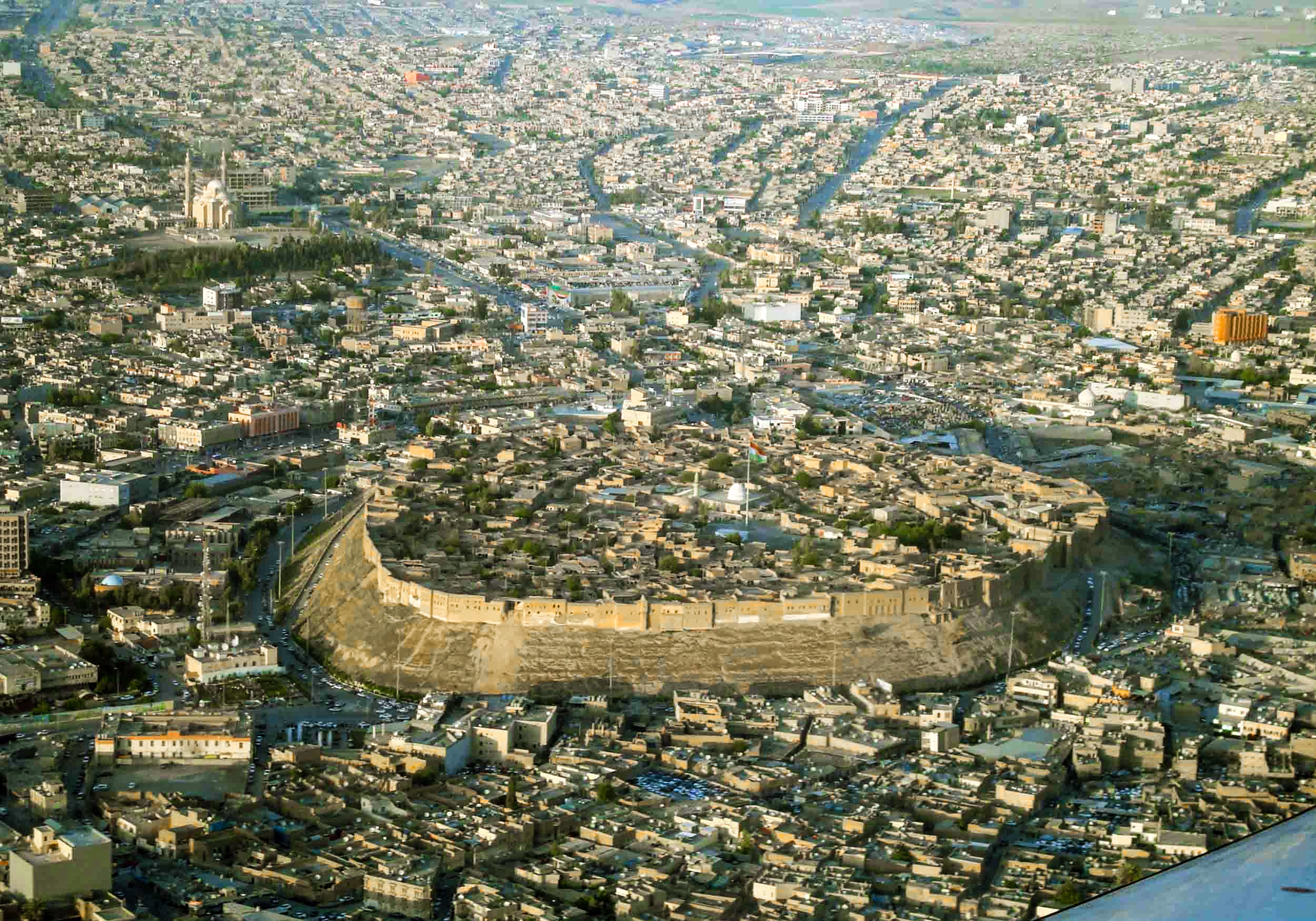
Aerial view of the Citadel of Erbil, surrounded by the modern city

== Academic establishments ==
- Salahaddin University: Founded in 1958 in Sulaymaniya and transferred to Erbil in 1981.
- Hawler Medical University: Founded in 2005.
- University of Kurdistan Hewlêr: Public English-medium university.
- Tishk International University (Previously called Ishik University): Private university that was established in 2008 in Erbil.
- Cihan University: Private university, founded in 2007.
- SABIS University: Private university.
- Soran University, KRG-Iraq governmental university founded in 2009.
- Knowledge University, KRG-Iraq Private university founded in 2009.
- Catholic University in Erbil, Private non-profit university founded in 2015.

== Banking ==
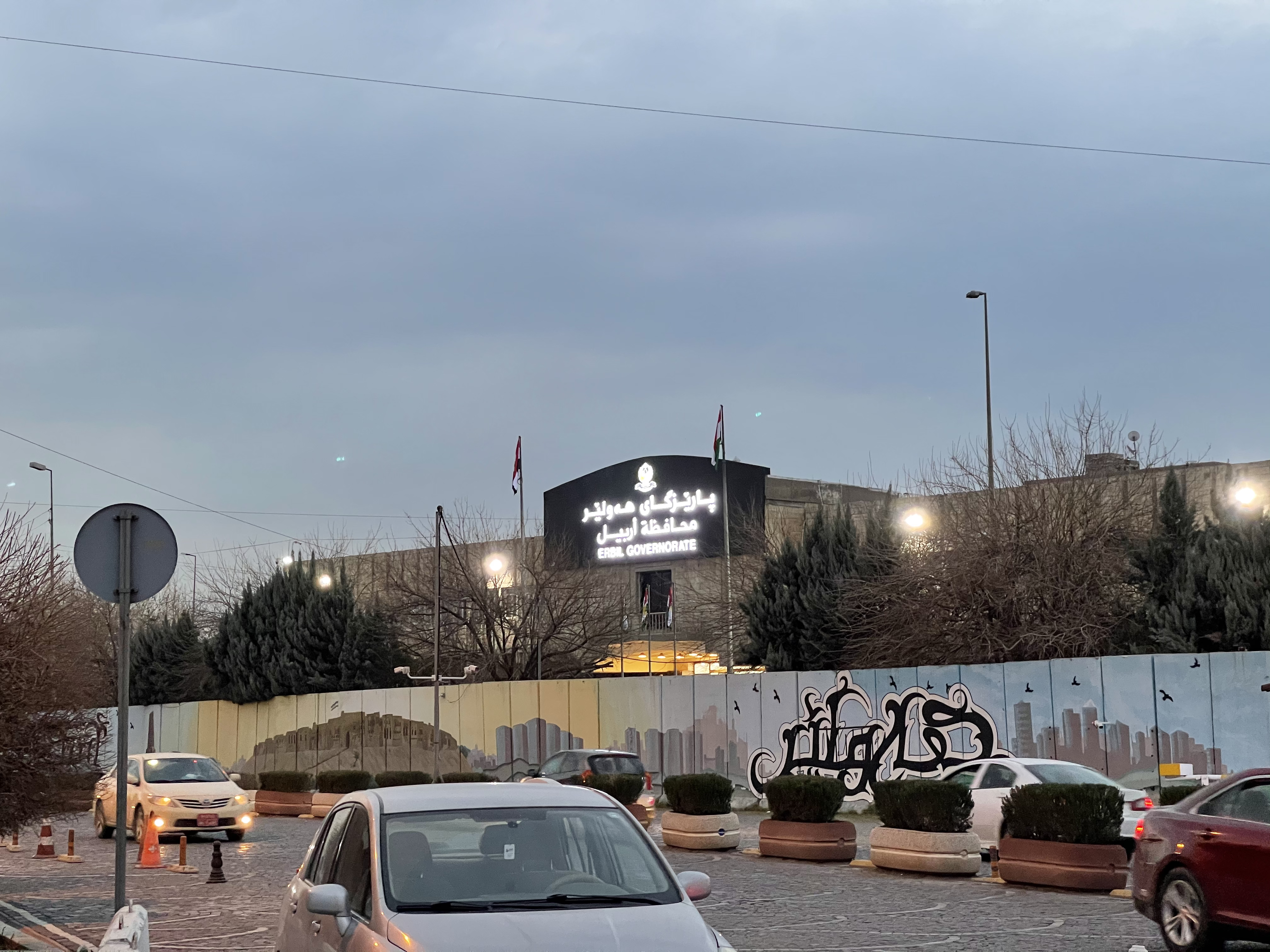
Erbil Governorate Building

There are many national and international banks operating in Erbil offering citizens and visitors services, including:

- Kurdistan Central Bank
- Kurdistan International Bank for Investment and Development
- Trade Bank of Iraq (TBI)
- Byblos Bank
- Bank of Beirut and Arab Countries (BBAC)
- Intercontinental Bank of Lebanon (IBL)
- BLOM Bank

== See also ==
- The archaeological hills in Erbil
- Shanidar Cave
- Lake Felaw
