= Choman District =

Choman District قەزای چۆمان Arabic: قضاء جومان
- District
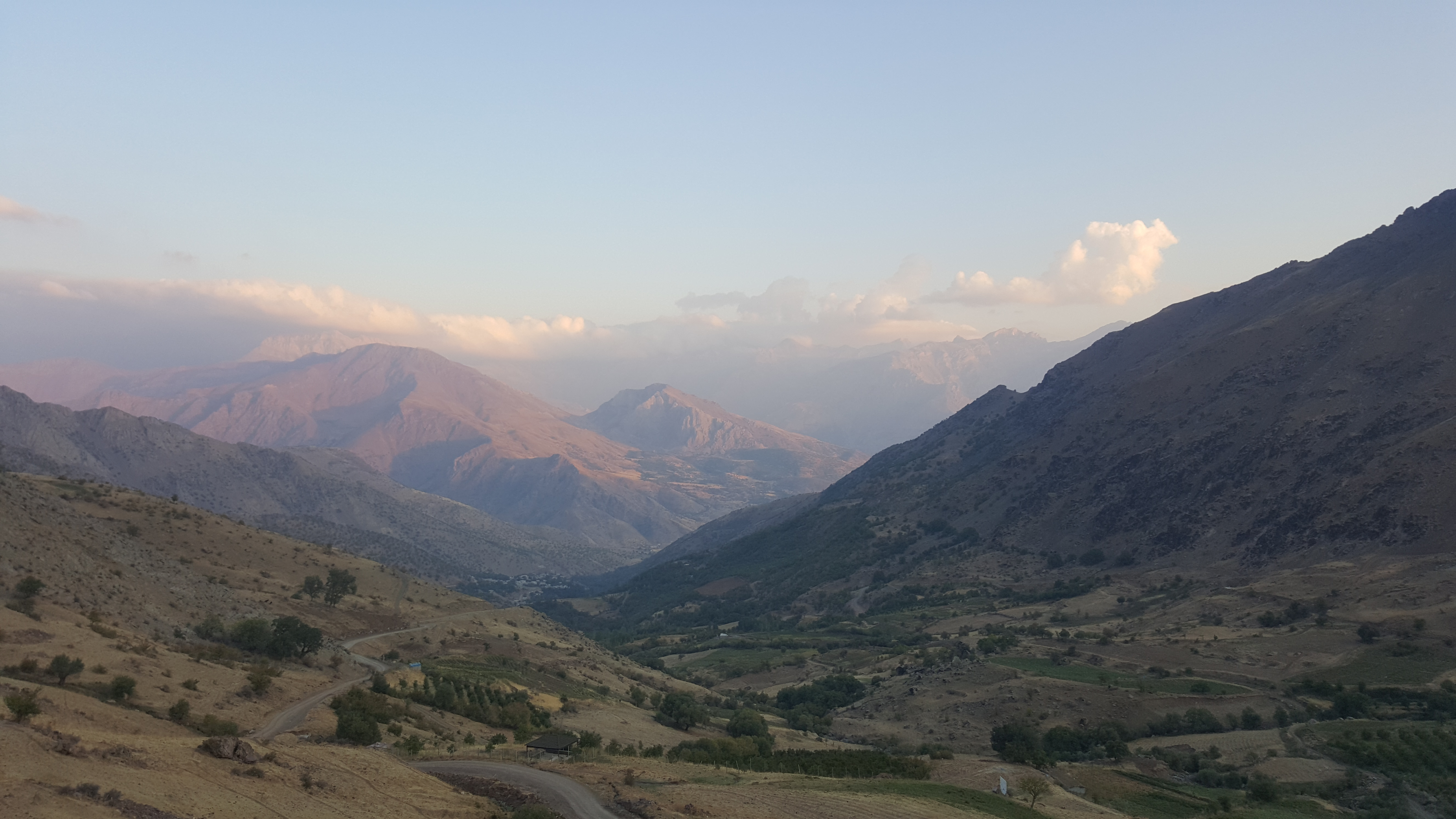

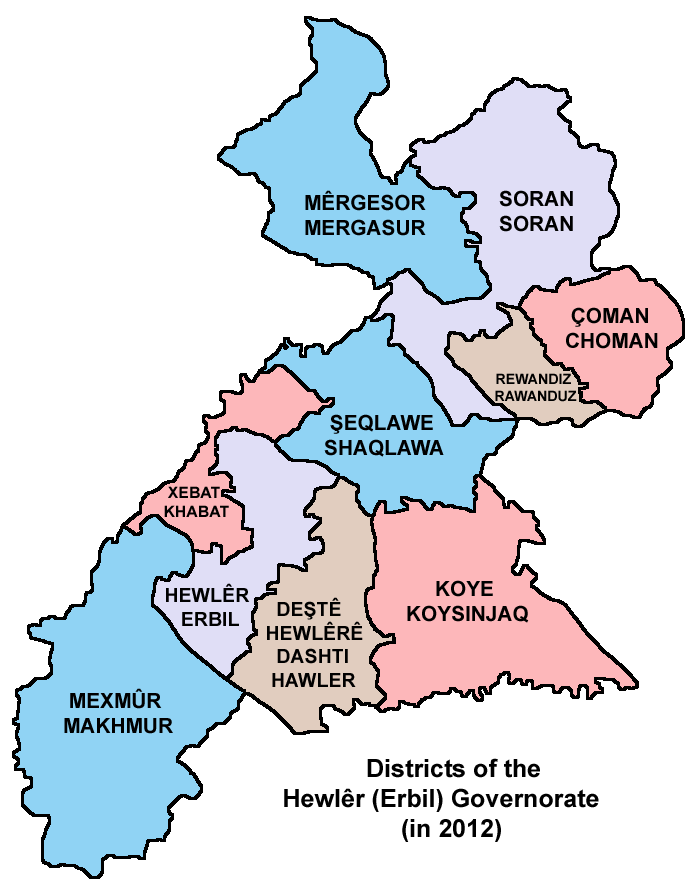
- Districts of Erbil Governorate (in 2012)
- Interactive map of Choman District
- Coordinates: 36°38′N 44°52′E
- Country: Iraq
- Autonomous region: Kurdistan Region
- Governorate: Erbil Governorate
- Seat: Choman
- Time zone: UTC+3 (AST)

Choman District (Kurdish: قەزای چۆمان, romanized: Qezay Çoman; Arabic: قضاء جومان) is a district in Erbil Province, Iraq. Its administrative centre is also called Choman. The District of Choman lies at the Iraqi-Iranian border, and is composed of four Sub-Districts Galala, Haji Omeran, Samilan and Qasre and about 166 villages.
