= Choman, Iraq =

City in the Erbil Governorate, Kurdistan Region, Iraq

Choman Kurdish: چۆمان
- City
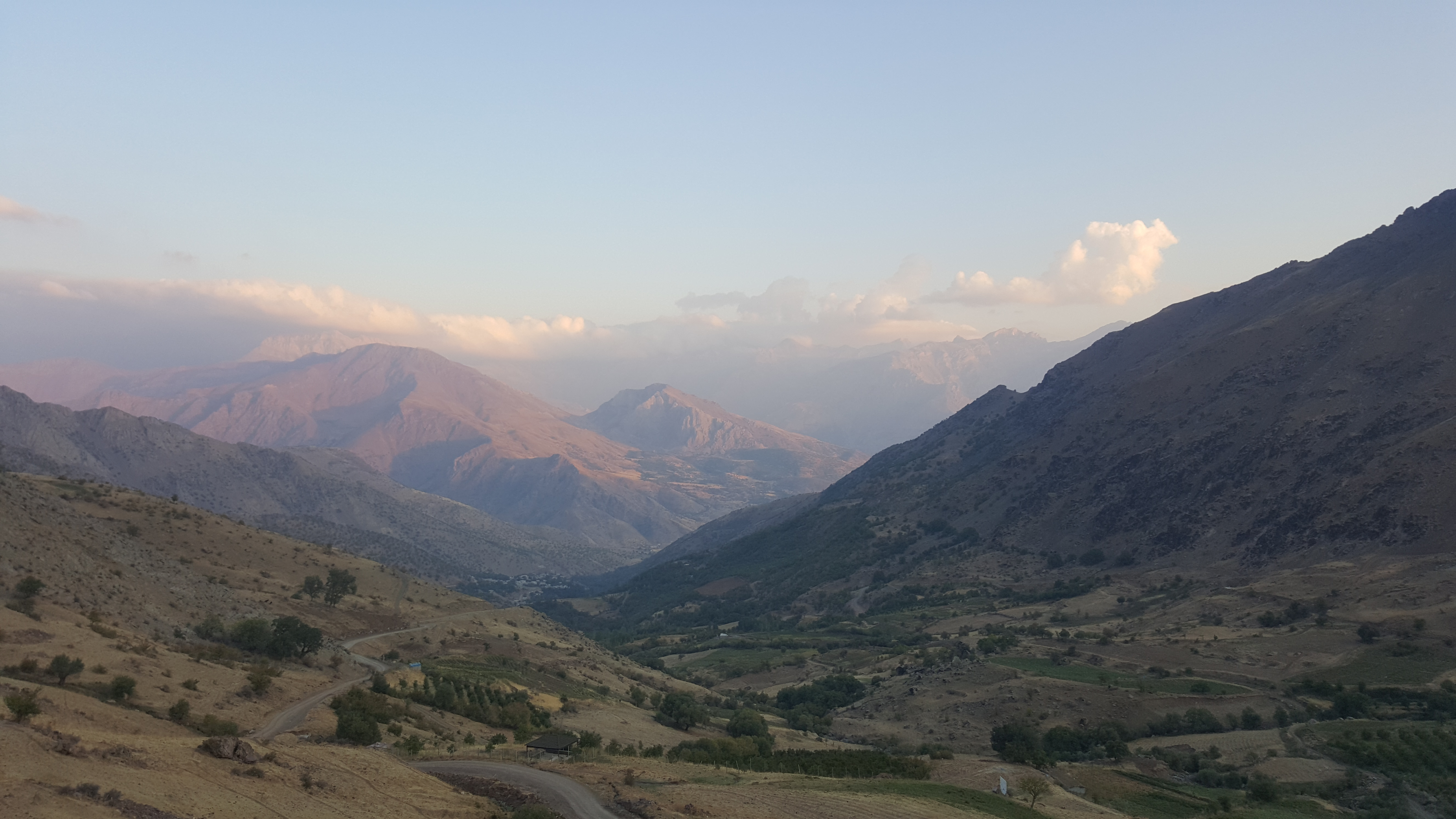
- Interactive map of Choman
- Country: Iraq
- Region: Kurdistan Region
- Governorate: Erbil Governorate
- District: Choman District

Choman (Kurdish: چۆمان, lit. 'Çoman', Arabic: جومان) is a city in Erbil Governorate of the Kurdistan Region in northern Iraq. It is the district capital of the Choman District.

The city is located 150 kilometres (93 mi) northeast of the city of Erbil. The city of Choman is inhabited by Kurds.
