= Erbil Observatory =

INAO Iraqi Kurdish National Astronomical Observatory

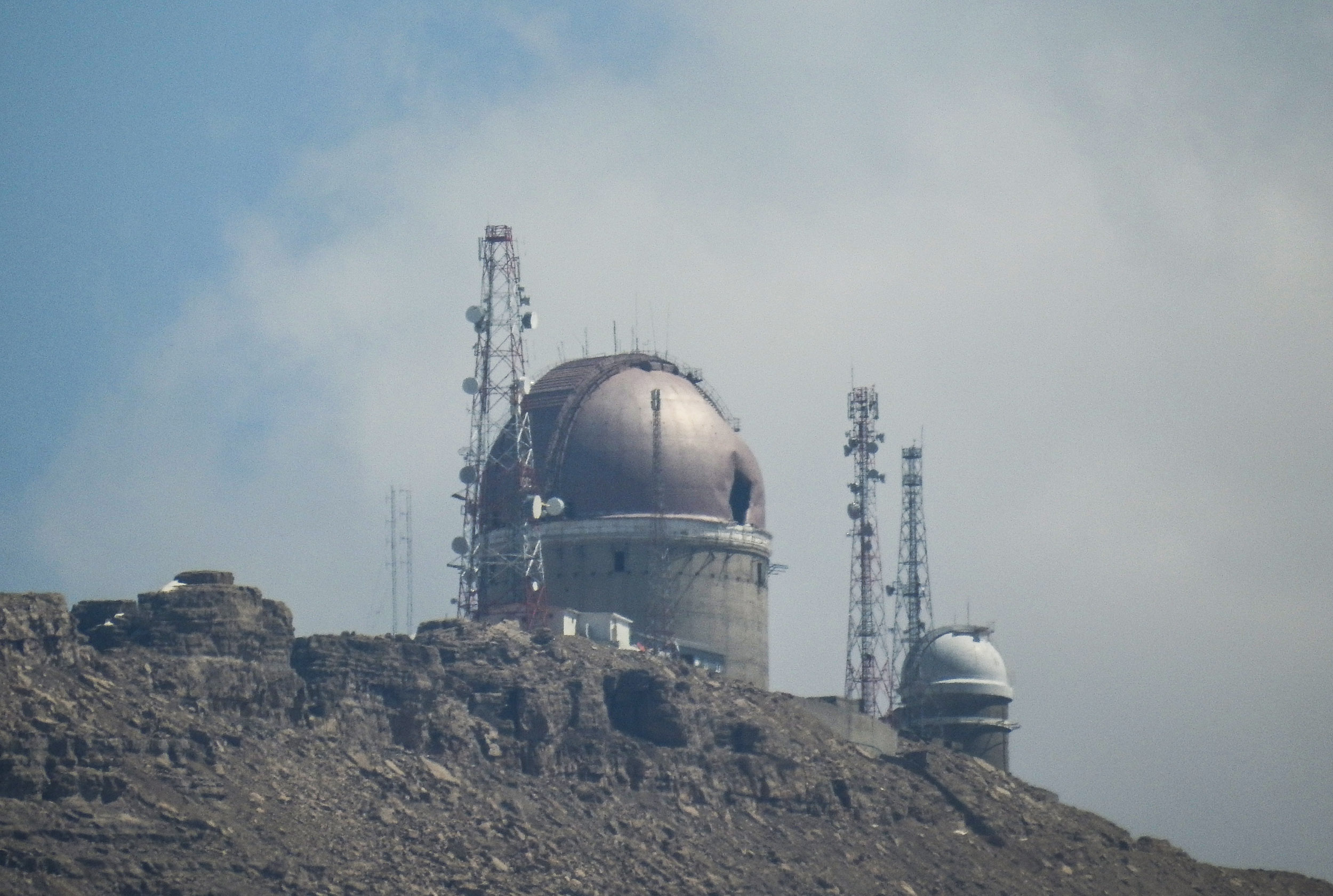
- The Erbil Observatory before its destruction
- Location: On top of Mount Korek, Erbil Governorate, Kurdistan Region, Iraq
- Coordinates: 36°35′3.26″N 44°27′54″E
- Altitude: 2,127 m (6,978 ft)
- Established: 1973
- Closed: Destroyed during the Iran–Iraq War
- Main contractors: Baresel, Epple, Krupp, Liebherr, Zeiss

Telescopes
- Telescope 1: 30 m Radio
- Telescope 2: 3.50 m Optical
- Telescope 3: 1.25 m Optical
- Location within Iraq

Erbil Observatory (Sorani Kurdish: ڕوانگەی ئاسمانیی ھەولێر; Arabic: مرصد أربيل) is an astronomical observatory in Erbil, The Kurdistan Region. It was established in 1973.

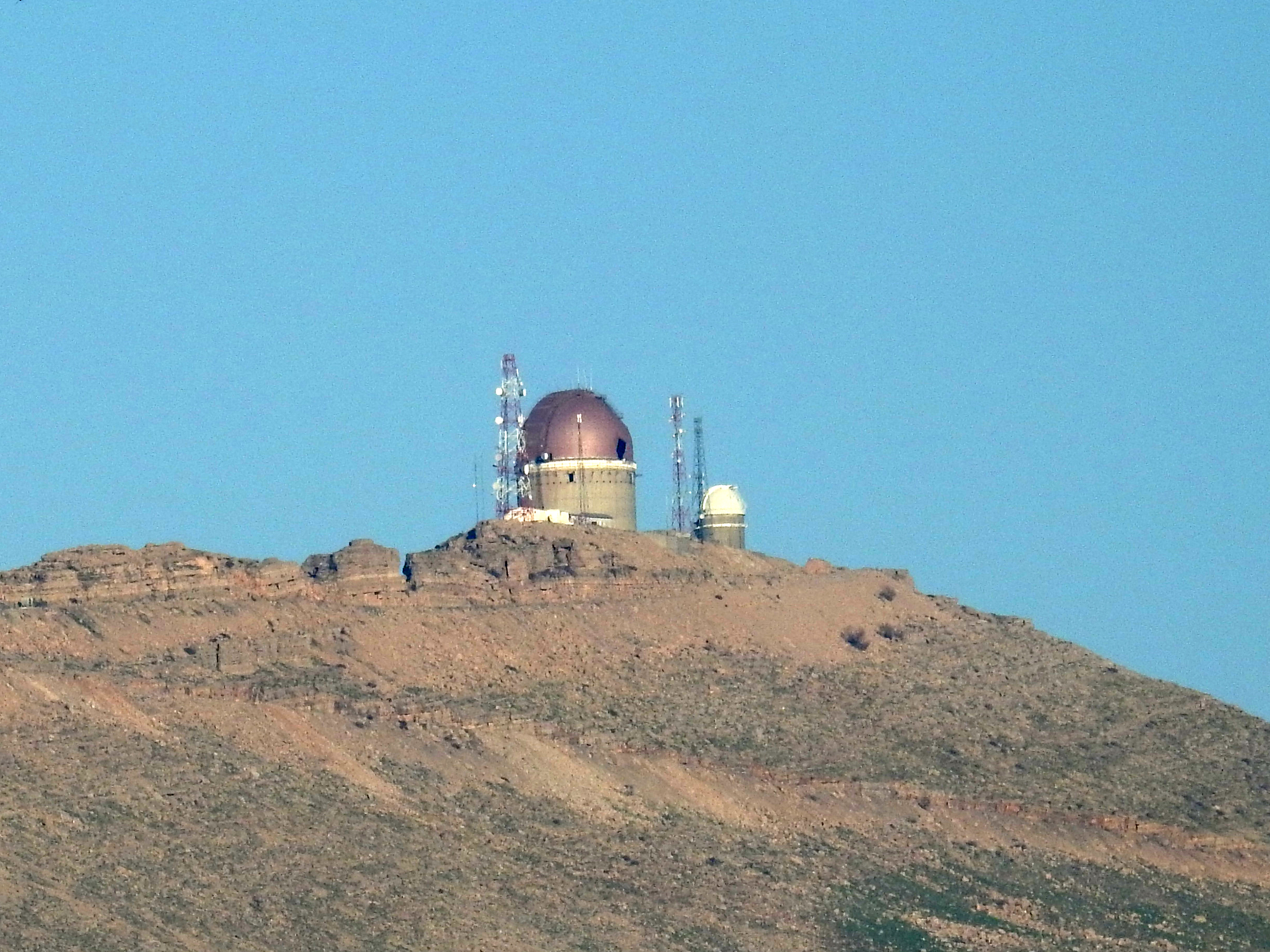
Erbil (Korek) Observatory

== History ==
In 1973 President Ahmed Hassan al-Bakr ordered the construction of the Erbil Observatory, an observatory with three telescopes.

In the early 1980s about 400 people were working on behalf of Baresel, Epple, Krupp, Liebherr and Zeiss to build 3 telescopes. In late 1983 they ran tests on the small telescope. Although the building site was close to the war zone, people were safe from the Iran military. 400 people from about 10 countries were working here. Each time the crew flew home for winter holidays, the building-site needed to take safety precautions due to heavy snowfalls. Eventually, the war made it impossible to finish the building. The partly-built Observatories were destroyed by the Iranian rockets launched during the Iran–Iraq War.

== In Art ==
Hito Steyerl included the Erbil Observatory in one of her short films.

== See also ==
- Abdul Athem Alsabti
- List of astronomical observatories
- Mount Korek
- May Kaftan-Kassim
