= György Zala =

György Zala may refer to:

- György Zala (canoeist)
- György Zala (sculptor)
