= The Korek Mountain Resort & Spa =

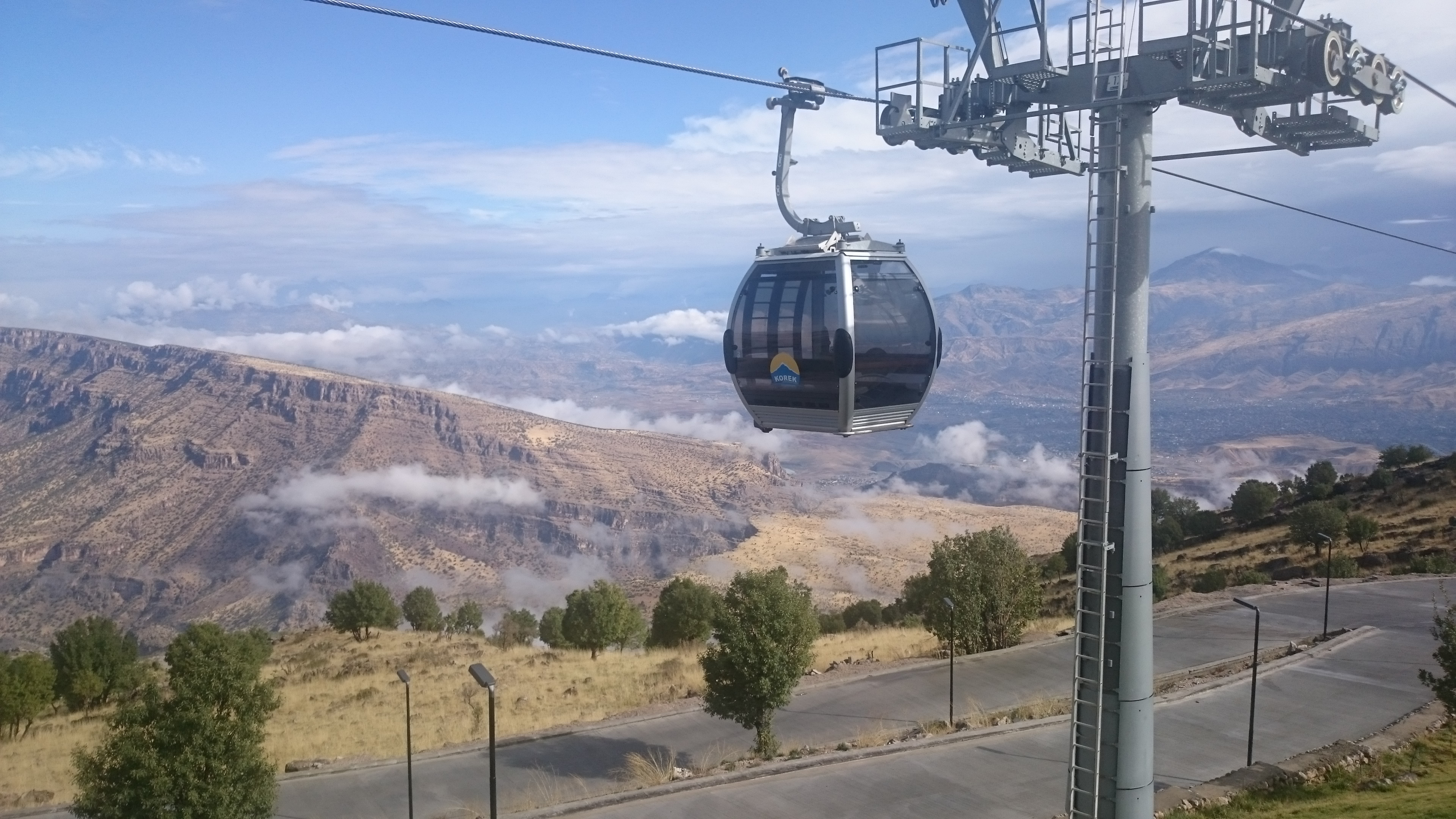
Korek Teleferic

The Korek Mountain Resort & Spa is located on Mount Korek near the town of Bekhal, Rawandoz, in the autonomous Region of Kurdistan in Northern Iraq. It is home to the only aerial lift in Iraq. The resort opened in 2014 cost $95m to construct. It was meant to launch Kurdistan's tourism industry, but it was impacted by political unrest. The facilities were built by the Darin Group, a general trading and construction company.

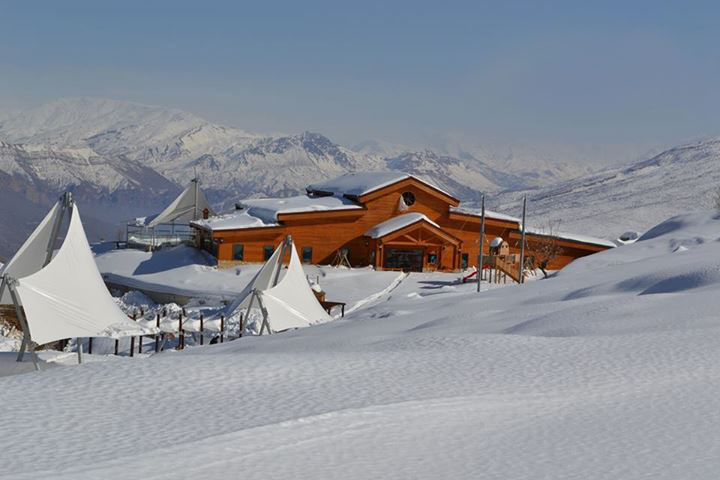
Restaurant at Korek Mountain Resort

The resort is built on top of Mount Korek at an elevation of 1690 meters, and is accessible by gondola (cable car) with a route approximately 4 km long, starting from TS Base in Bekhal.

The resort hosts an annual snow festival organized by the local government.

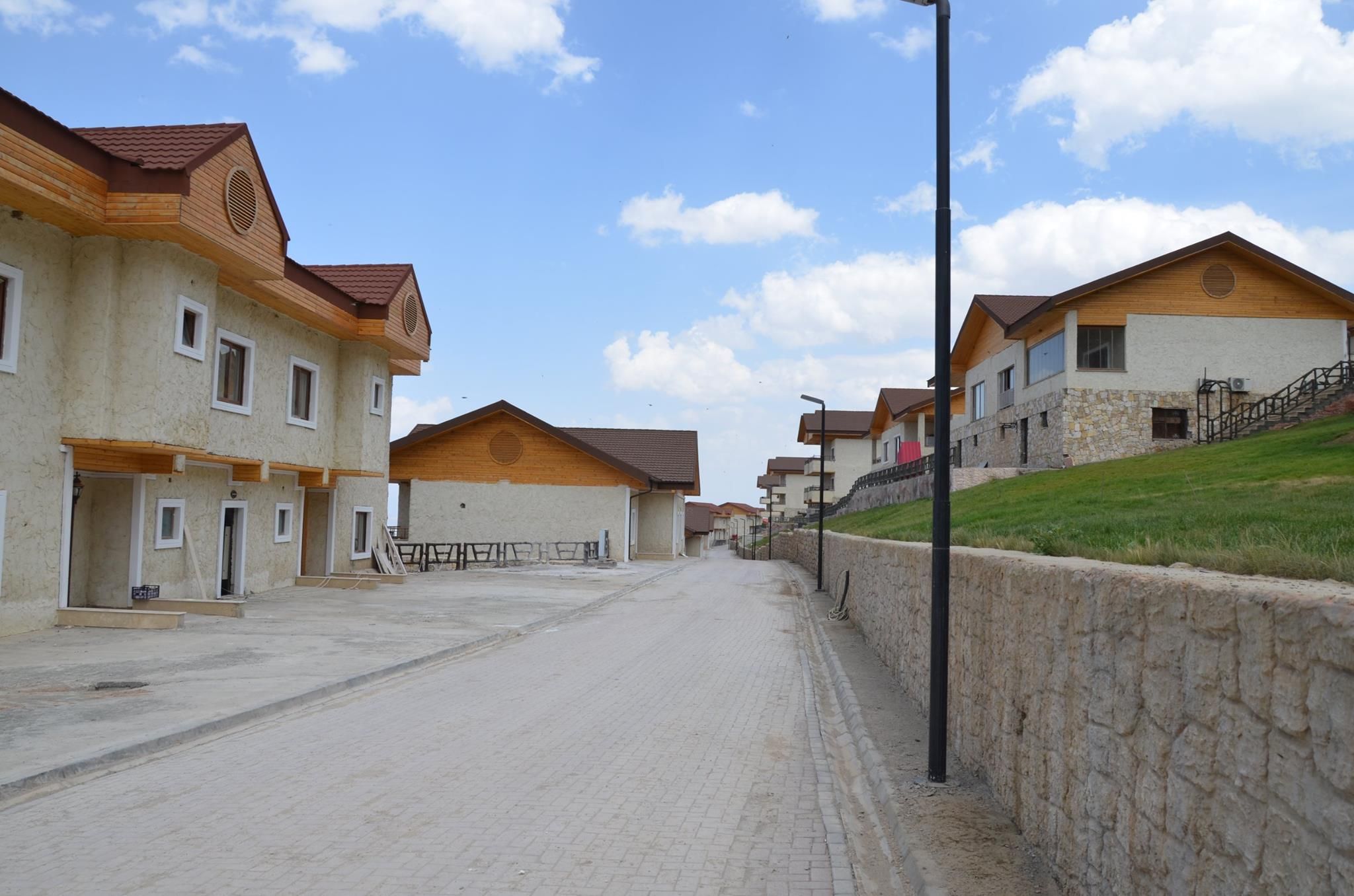
