= Wilhelm von Rümann =

German sculptor (1850–1906)

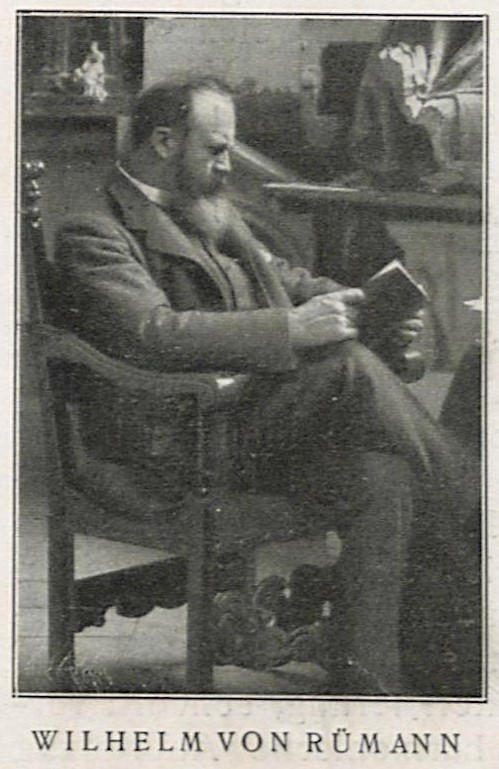
- Born: November 11, 1850; Hanover, Kingdom of Hanover
- Died: February 6, 1906 (aged 55); Ajaccio, Corsica, France
- Resting place: Nordfriedhof (Munich), Germany
- Education: Academy of Fine Arts, Munich; Michael Wagmüller

Wilhelm von Rümann (11 November 1850 in Hanover – 6 February 1906 in Ajaccio) was a prominent German sculptor, based in Munich.

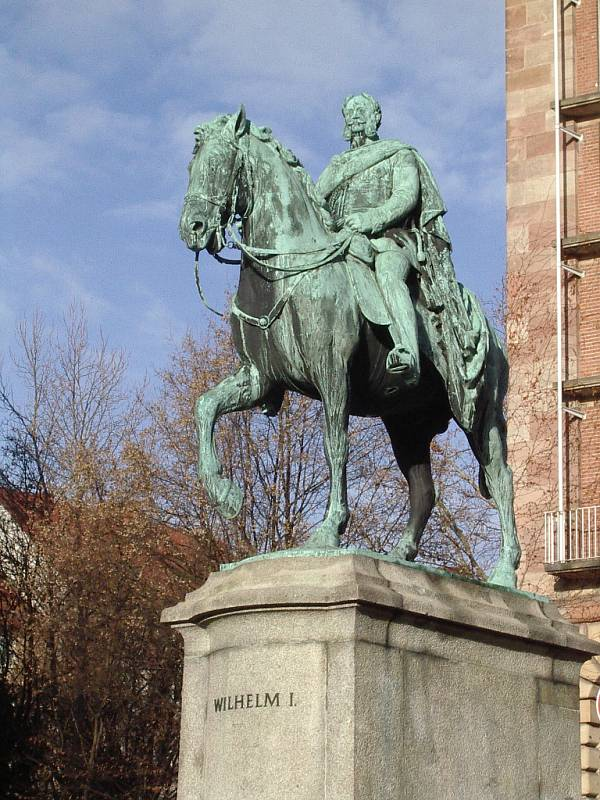
Equestrian monument of Kaiser Wilhelm I in Nuremberg, begun by Syrius Eberle

== Life ==
Rümann was born in Hanover. He studied from 1872 to 1874 at the Academy of Fine Arts, Munich (Akademie der Bildenden Künste München), and from 1880 with Michael Wagmüller. From 1887 he taught at the Academy of Fine Arts, Munich. In 1891, he was raised to the nobility.

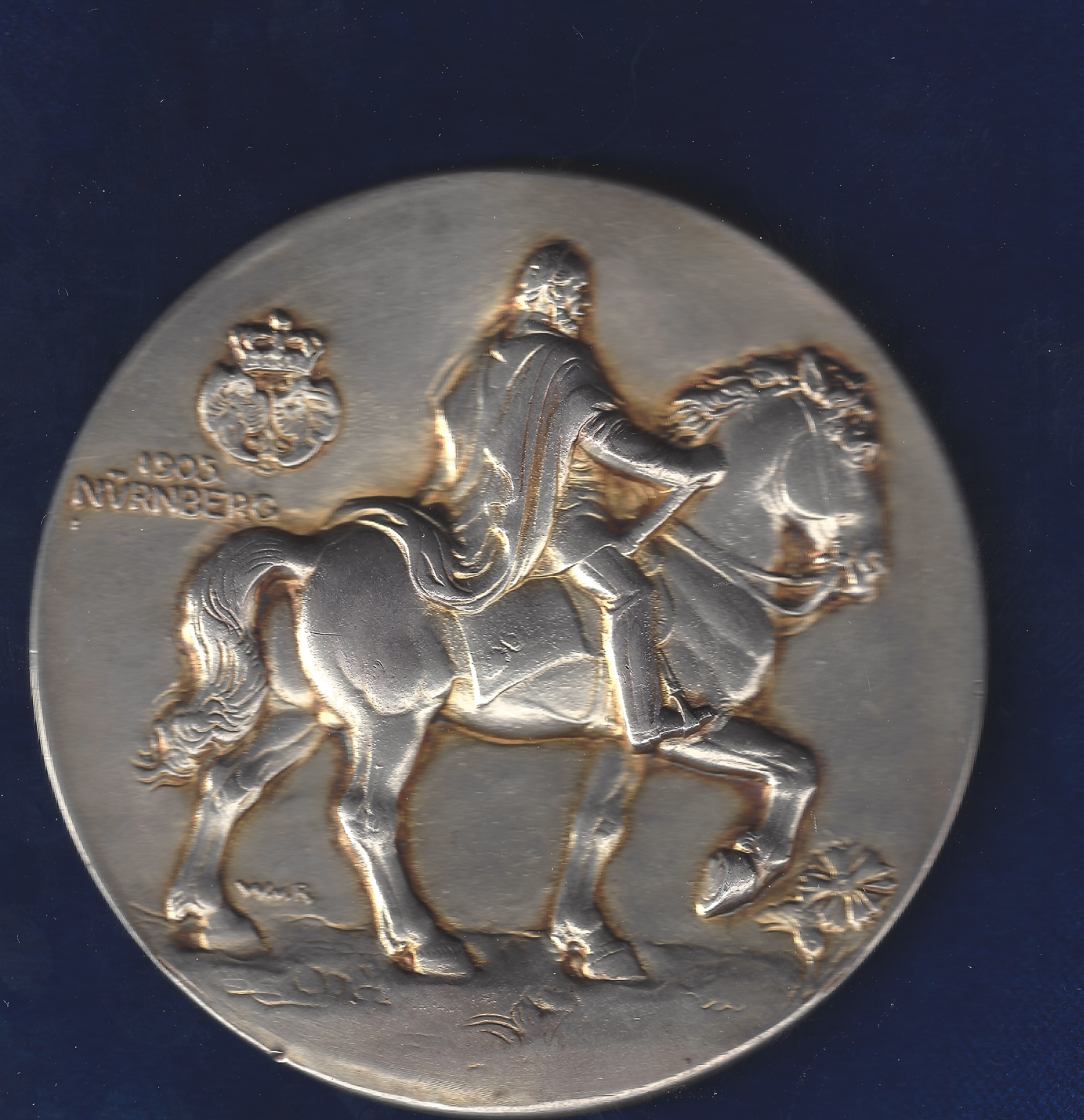
Nürnberg, Art Nouveau Silver Medal 1905 by Ruemann, reverse. This large medal was given by the city of Nürnberg to the Royalties attending the ceremony of the unveiling of the monument in honour of Kaiser Wilhelm I on 14 December 1905 in Nuremberg.

As well as numerous funerary monuments in the Alter Südfriedhof (Old South Burial Ground) in Munich, he created sculptures which are still to be seen in the city: monuments for Georg Simon Ohm (1895, in the courtyard of the Technical University of Munich), Max von Pettenkofer (1909) and Carl von Effner (1886) at the Maximiliansplatz (now the Lenbachplatz), the Puttenbrunnen (Putti Fountain) at the Peace Monument in the Prinzregentenstraße (originally intended for Schloss Herrenchiemsee) and the marble lions in front of the Feldherrnhalle (1906).

Among his pupils were Bernhard Bleeker, Emil Julius Epple, Jakob Hofmann, Moissey Kogan, Martin Scheible and Alois Mayer.

He died in Ajaccio, Corsica, and is buried in the Nordfriedhof ("Northern Cemetery"), Munich.

== Works (public monuments) ==
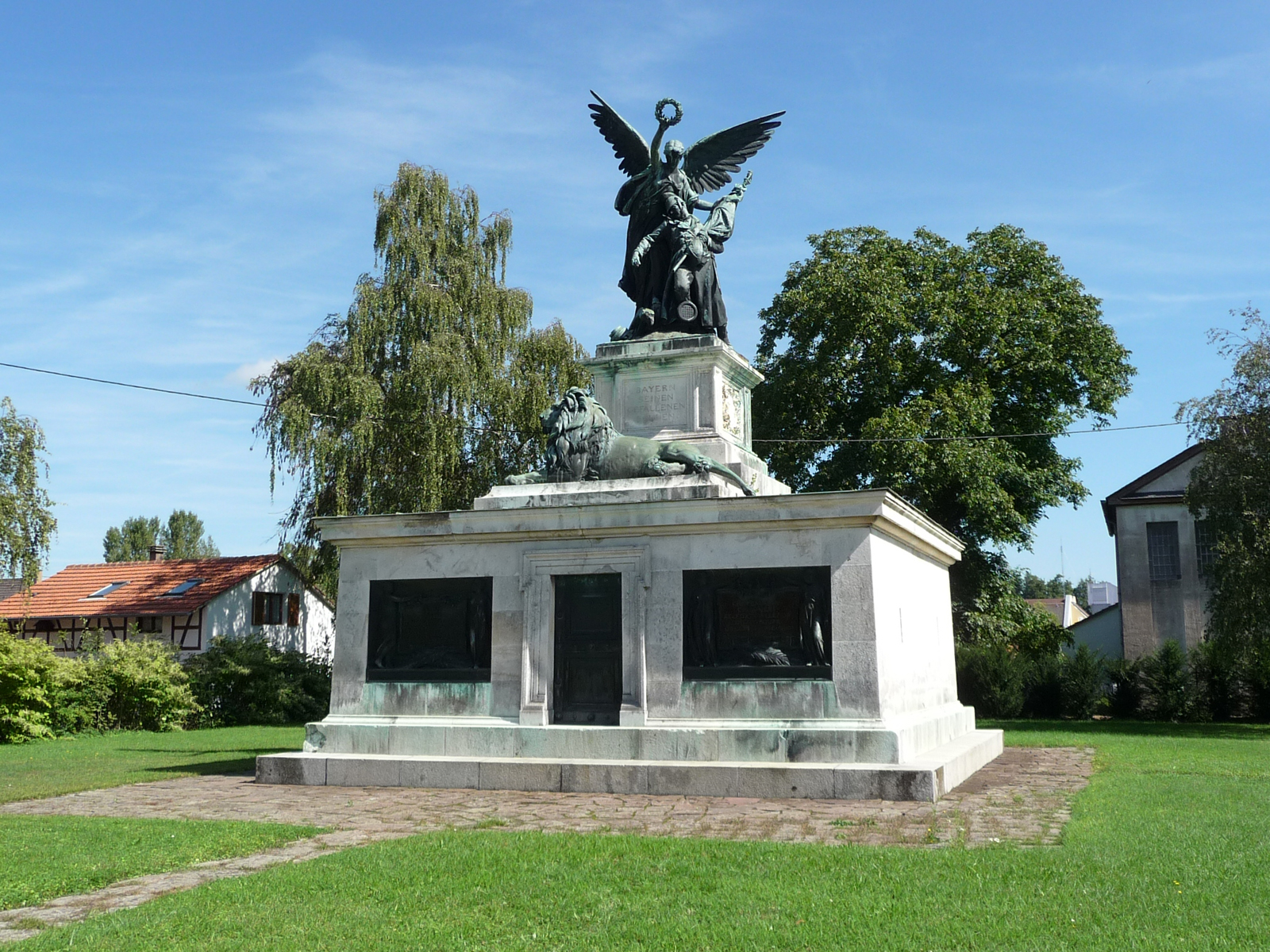
Bavarian War Memorial, Woerth

- Chemnitz:
  - Kaiser Wilhelm I: equestrian statue in the marketplace; sent for scrap after 1945
  - Bismarck Statue (1899), to the left; sent for scrap after 1945
  - Moltke Statue, to the right; sent for scrap after 1945
- Heilbronn:
  - Kaiser Wilhelm I Monument (1895), originally in front of the Harmonie Concert and Congress Centre, now in the Alter Friedhof (Old Graveyard) in the Weinsberger Straße
  - Robert Mayer Statue, in the marketplace
- Munich:
  - Monument of Georg Simon Ohm, 1895
  - Funerary monument of Princess Ludovika of Bavaria
  - Several statues of Prince Luitpold of Bavaria, the Prince Regent, including one in the south-west of Siedlung Neuhausen
  - Bust of Princess Theresa of Bavaria (in the Bavarian Academy of Sciences and Humanities)
  - Bust of Wilhelm Bauer in the Deutsches Museum
  - and many others
- Nuremberg:
  - Kaiser Wilhelm I equestrian statue (1905) (designed and begun by Syrius Eberle, who died in 1903; completed by Rümann), Egidienplatz, in front of the Pellerhaus
  - Statue of Prince Regent Luitpold (1901), station forecourt, removed in 1934, melted down in 1939
- Stuttgart:
  - Kaiser Wilhelm I equestrian statue (1898)
- Bad Urach: bust of Bismarck in the Schloßstraße
- Woerth, Alsace, France: Bavarian National War Memorial 1870, made 1889

== Gallery ==
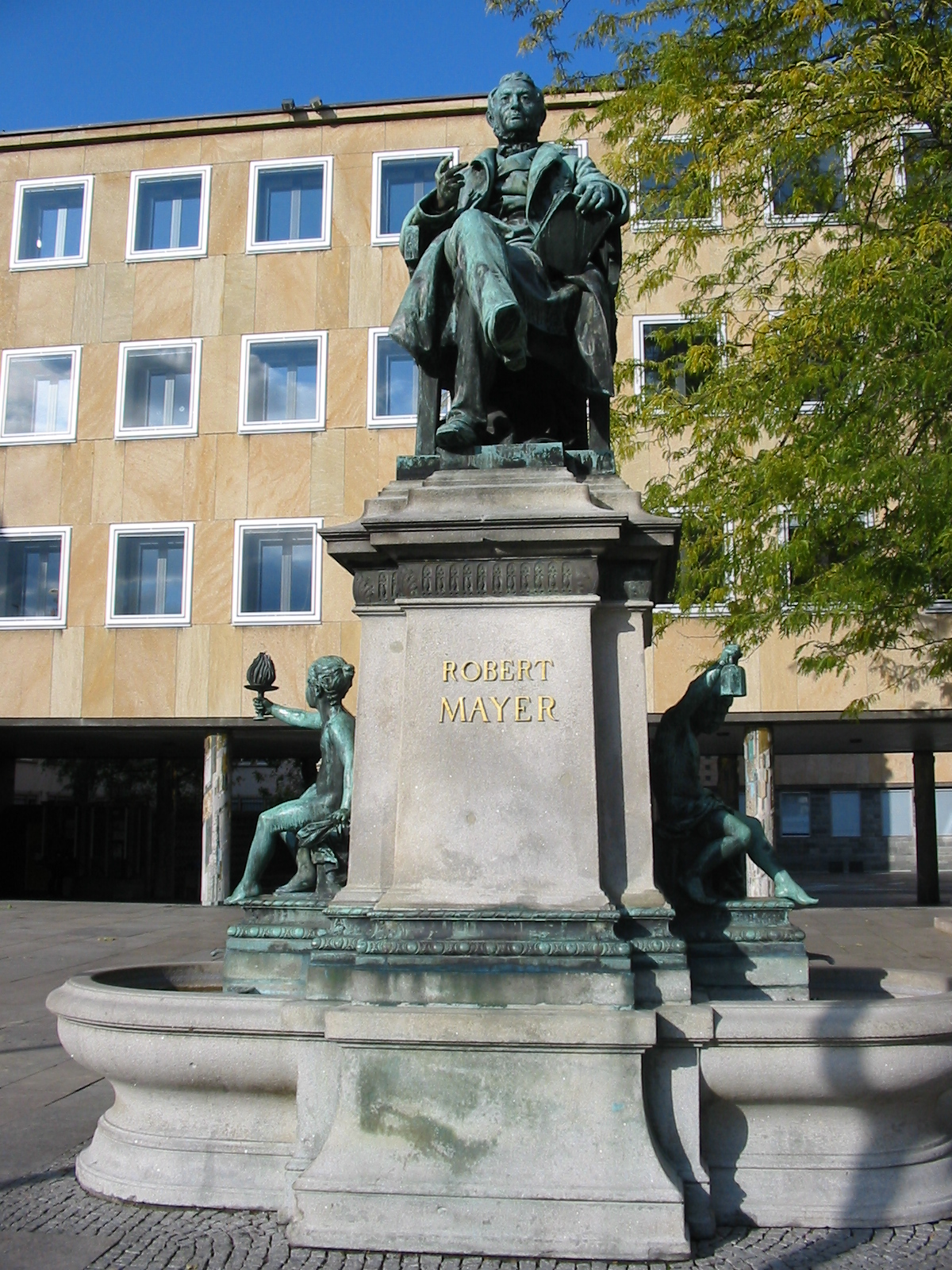
Heilbronn:
Greater than life-sized bronze figure of Julius Robert von Mayer (1892)

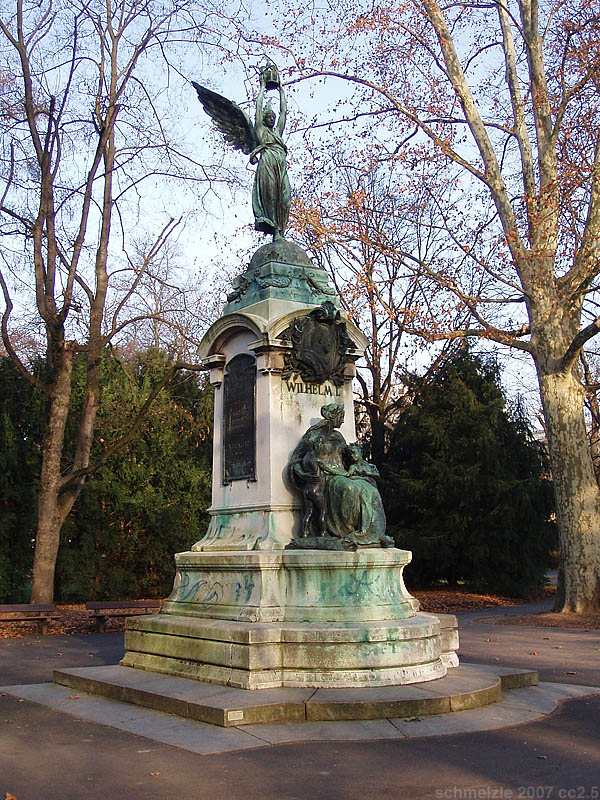
Heilbronn:
Kaiser Wilhelm Monument (1893) (based on designs by Ludwig Pfau)

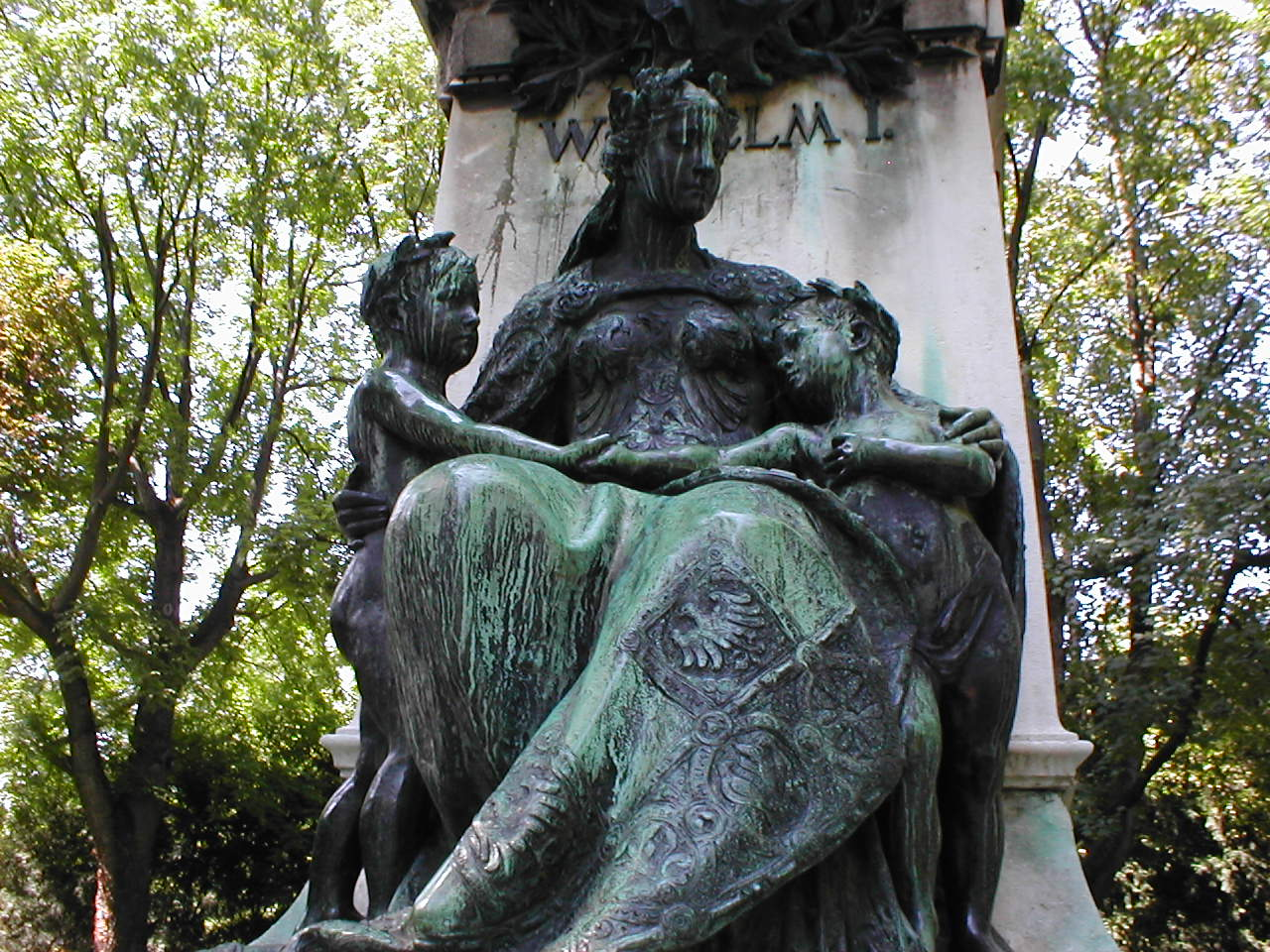
Heilbronn:
Detail of the Kaiser Wilhelm Monument in the Alter Friedhof

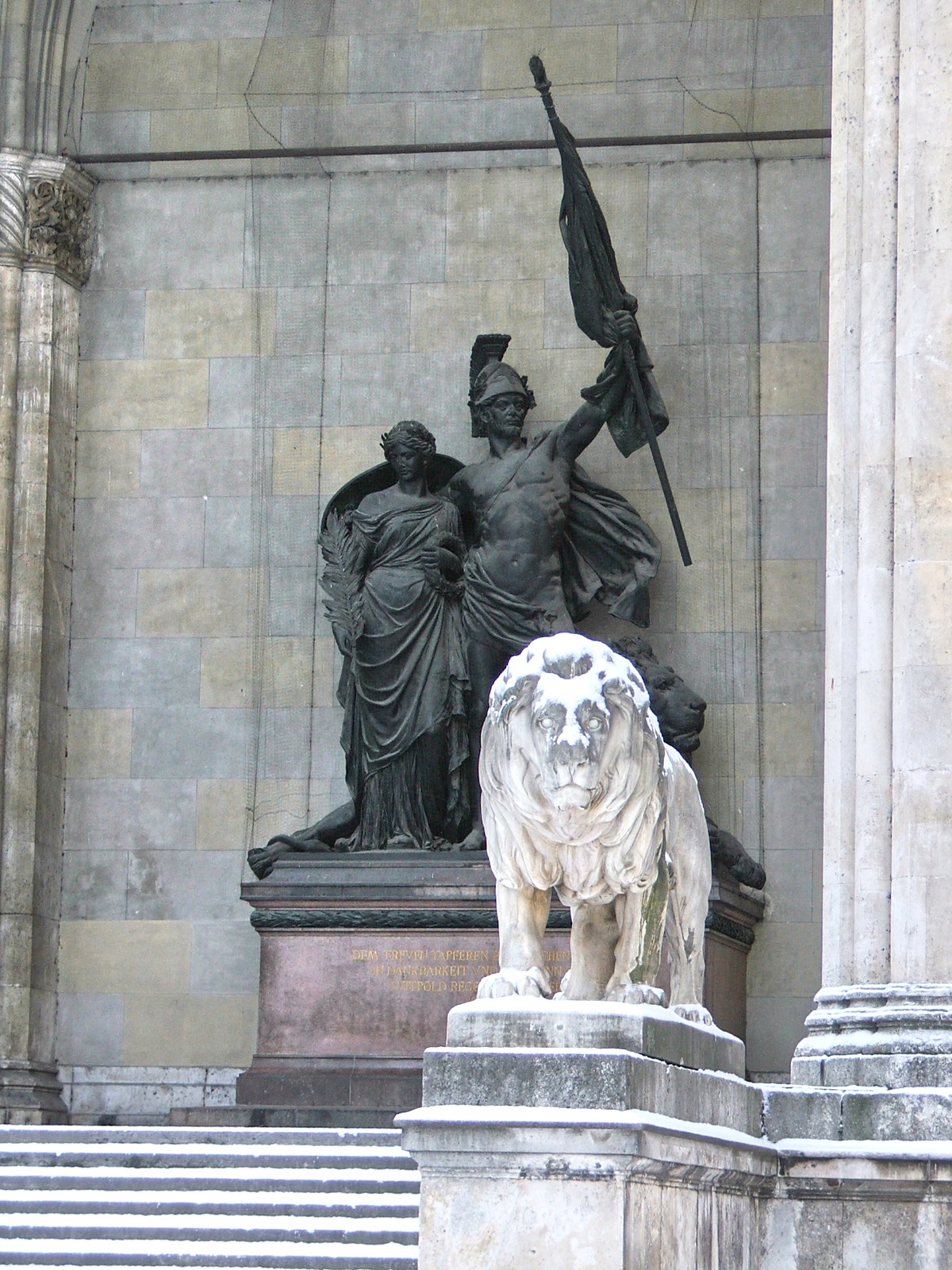
Munich:
Lion in front of the Feldherrnhalle

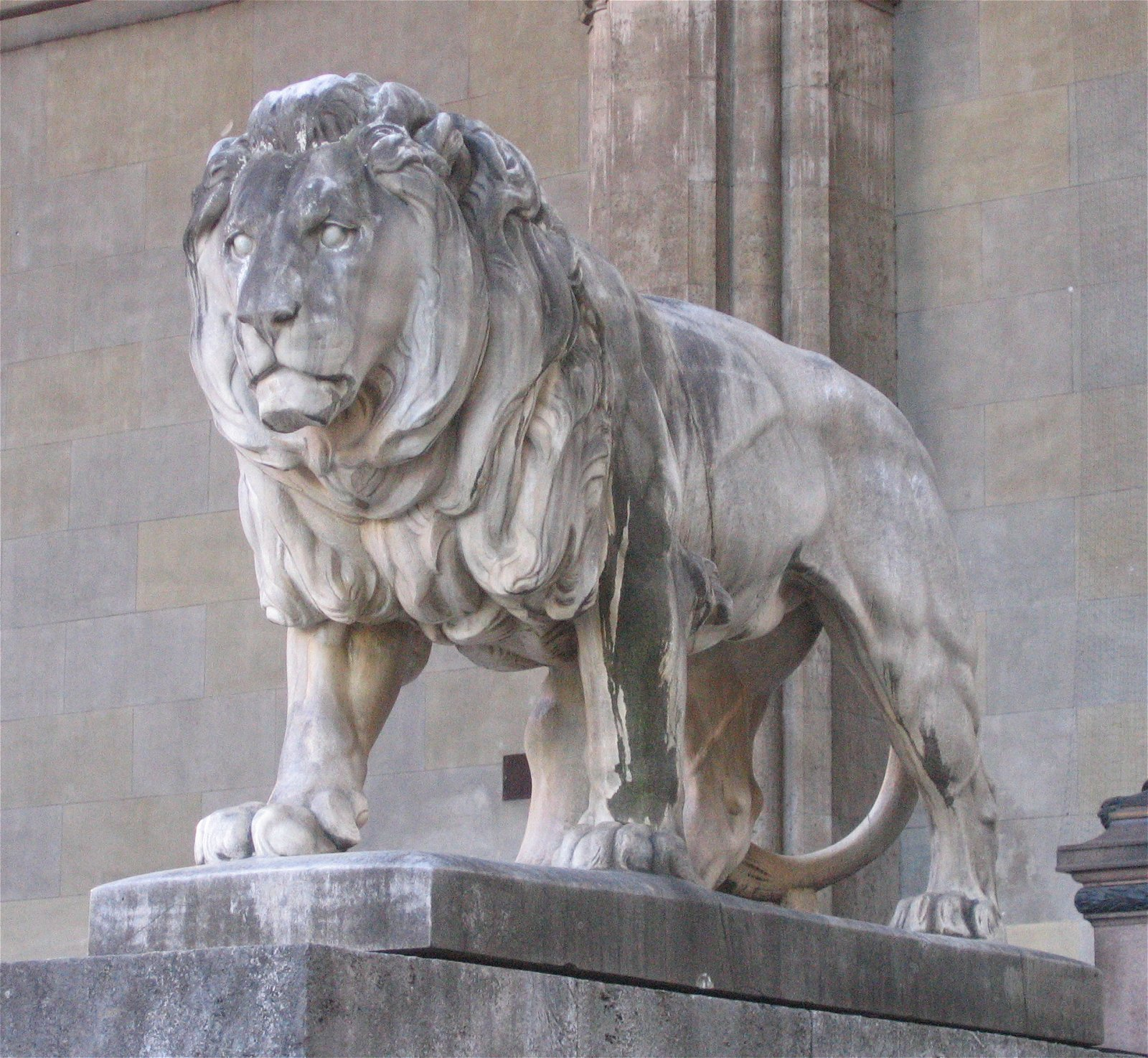
Munich:
Lion in front of the Feldherrnhalle

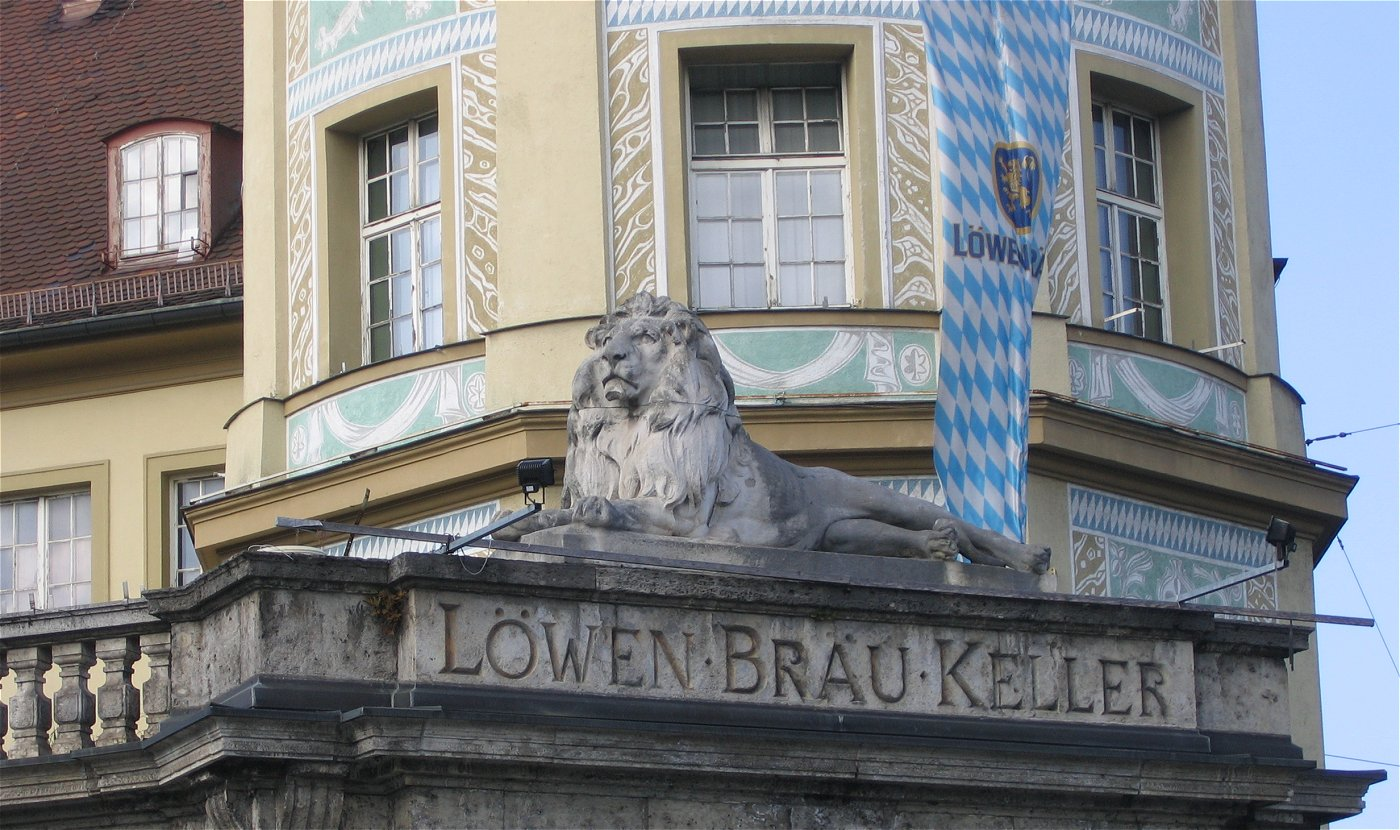
Munich:
Lion on the terrace of the Löwenbräukeller

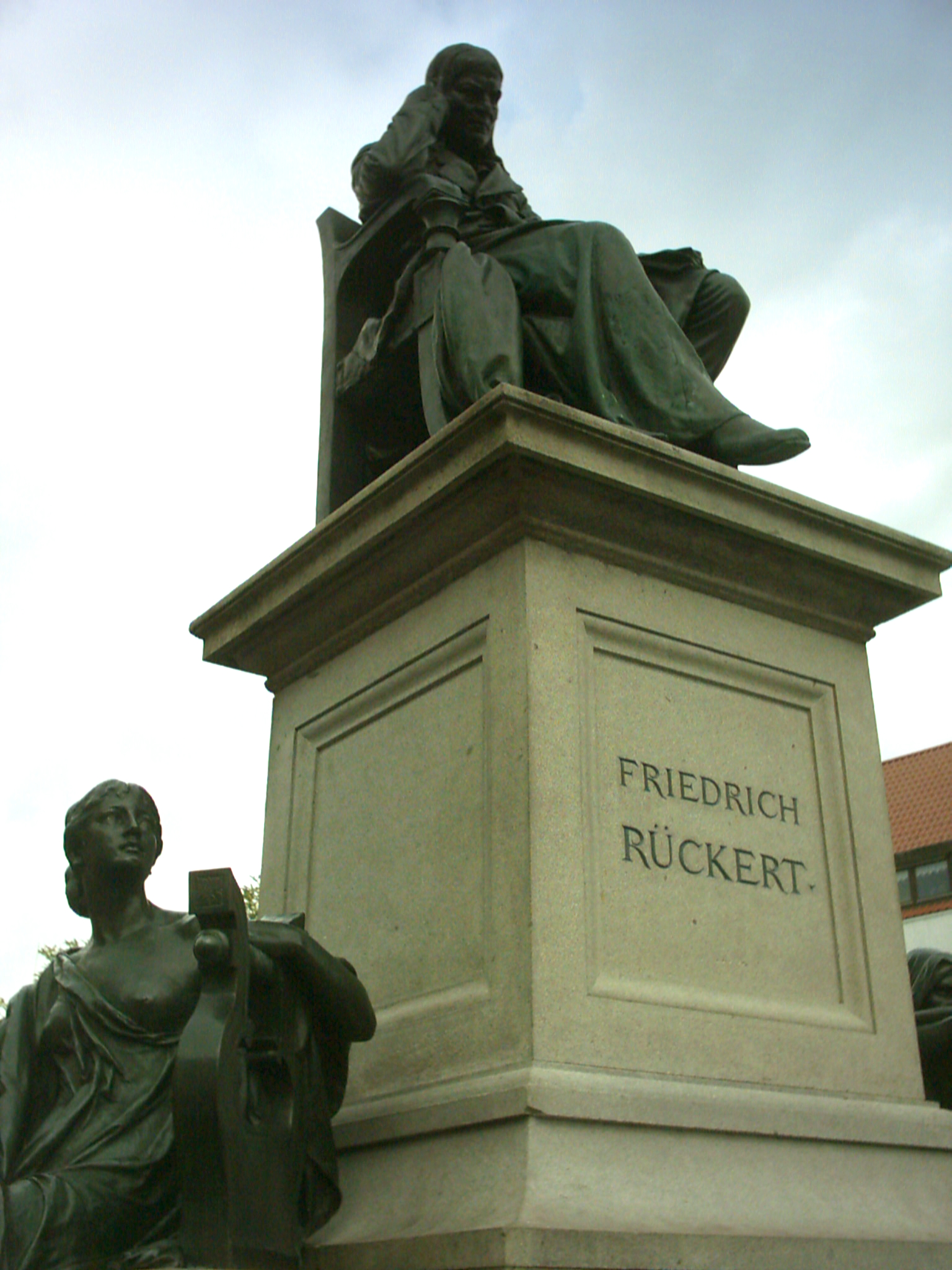
Schweinfurt
Friedrich Rückert monument

== Sources ==
- Rümann, Wilhelm von. In: Ulrich Thieme, Felix Becker u. a.: Allgemeines Lexikon der Bildenden Künstler von der Antike bis zur Gegenwart. Band 29, E. A. Seemann, Leipzig 1935
- Matrikeldatenbank der Akademie der Bildenden Künste: Wilhelm von Rümann (1850–1906)
