= György Zala (sculptor) =

Hungarian sculptor

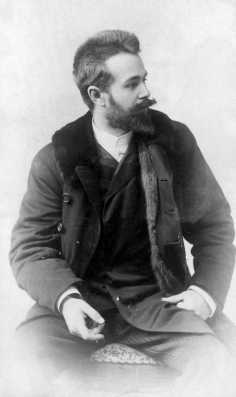
György Zala, 1887, photographed by Sándor Strelisky

György Zala (16 April 1858 in Alsólendva, today Slovenija – 31 July 1937 in Budapest) (sometimes: Georg Zala) was a Hungarian sculptor. Along with Alajos Strobl and János Fadrusz, he is one of Hungary's leading public sculptors of the late 19th and early 20th century.

== Biography ==
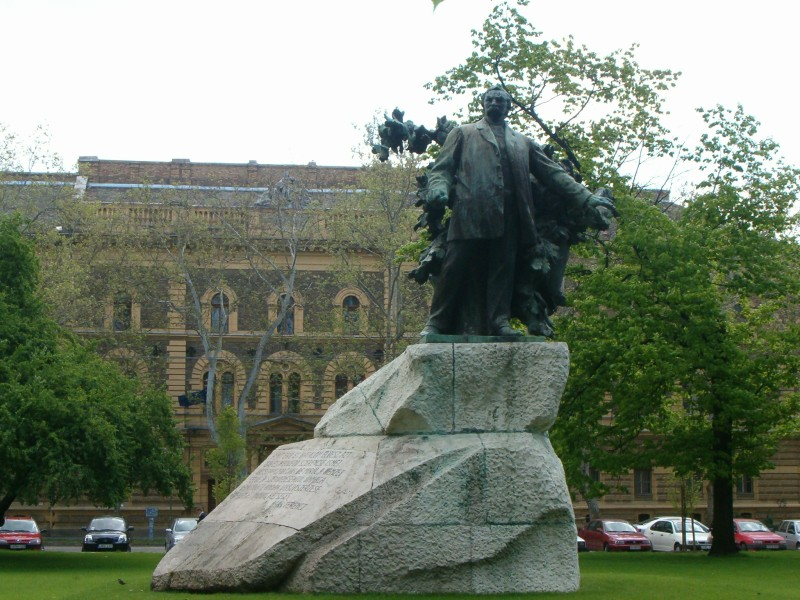
Ferenc Deák monument in Szeged

Orphaned at the age of 8, Zala spent several years in schools in Városlőd and Pápa. He studied under Edmund Hellmer and Kaspar von Zumbusch at the Vienna Academy at the age of 21 and then under Josep Knábl, Max Wittman, Michael Wagmüller, and Eberle Siriusat at the Munich Academy. Along with Janos Fadrusz and Alajos Strobl, Zala studied at the Budapest Academy.

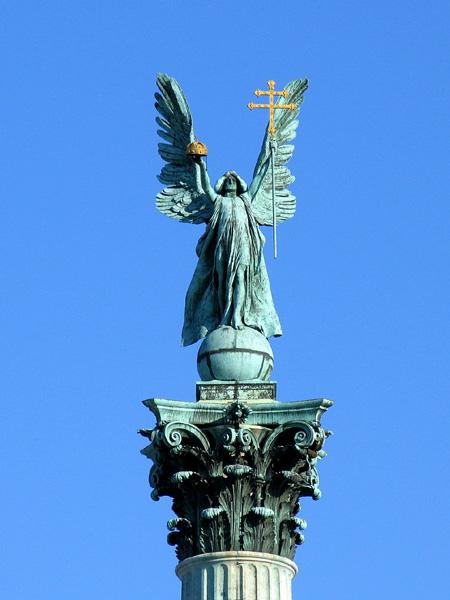
Archangel Gabriel in Budapest

His first work of renown upon his return to Hungary was a marble statue named "Mary and Magdalene" in 1884, winning the academy gold medal and the prize of the Hungarian Council of Fine Arts. His tombstone of József Csukássi won him a gold medal in Antwerp. While he began working on a statue of Adolf Huszár and didn't complete it; he did complete "The Martyrs of Arad" of the Liberty Monument in Arad in 1894 which included a statue of Mátyás Hunyadi.

He was commissioned to produce numerous neo-baroque memorials including "Soldier" (1889–93), which is a cannon metal statue of a Honvéd (private soldier) on the Dísz Square in Budapest to commemorate the 'defenders of the homeland' who fought in the Hungarian War of Independence. He also created the equestrian statue of Gyula Andrássy with six other sculptors at the Millennium Memorial on Hősök tere in Budapest and a statue of the Archangel Gabriel at the same place which won a "Grand Prix" at the Paris exhibition of 1900. Under the short-lived 1919 Hungarian Soviet Republic, a statue of Karl Marx (also erected on Hősök tere to replace statues from the Habsburg era) was either sculpted in Zala's studio or by Zala himself. Later, he completed the statue "Queen Elizabeth" in Vienna in 1932, and in 1934, he collaborated with Antal Orbán to produce "Statue of István Tisza", a statue which no longer exists.

Notable portraits include "Bust of Antal Ligeti" (1887), "Franz Josef I" (1905) in Kerepesi Cemetery, Budapest, the Ferenc Deák monument (1914) in Szeged, Jenő Zsigmondy, and Mór Jókai, and women such as Ilona Lukács (Béla Jármay's wife), Róza Laborfalvy and Lujza Blaha.

== Legacy ==
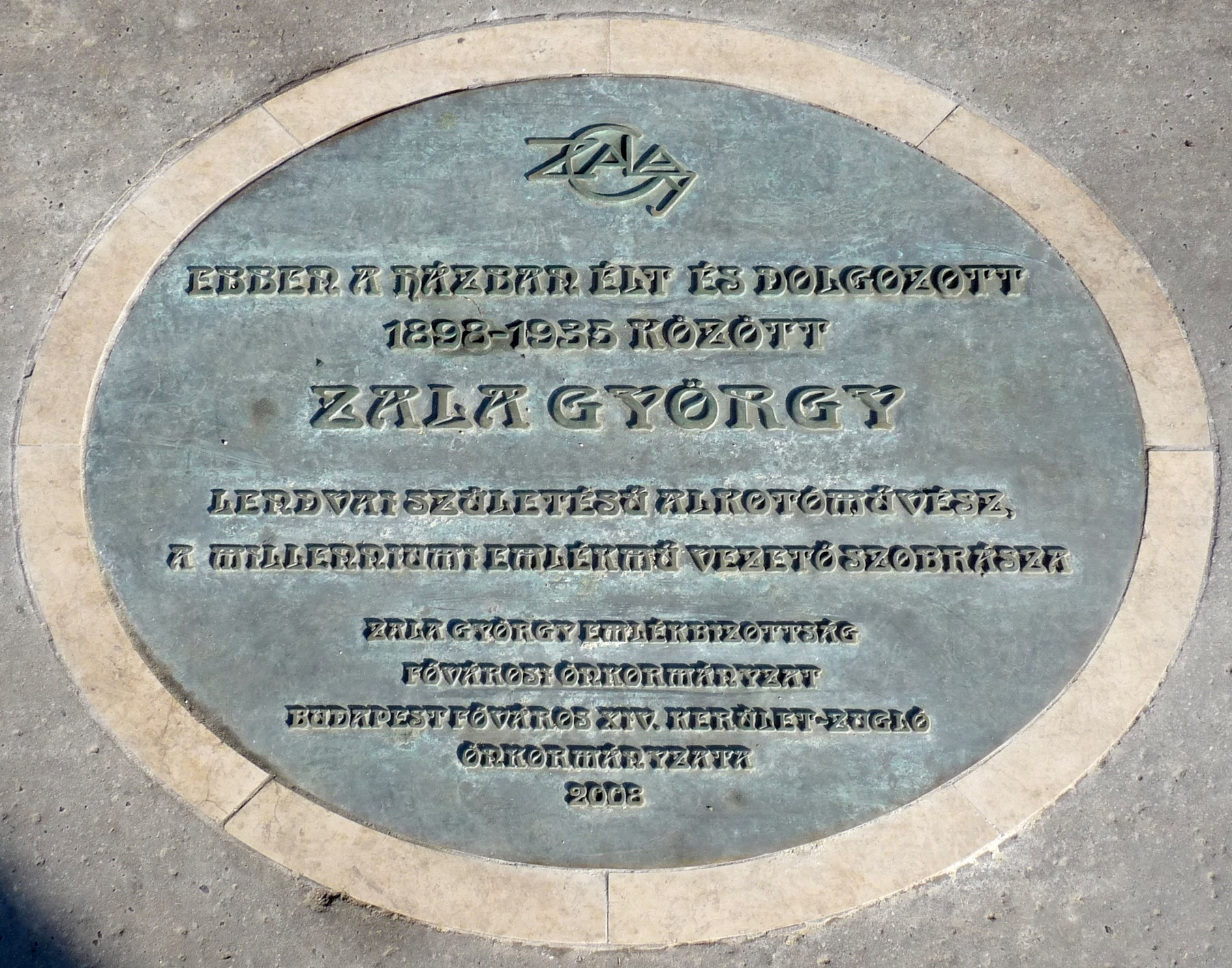
György Zala plaque in Budapest

Upon his death on 31 July 1937, Zala was given a state funeral and buried at Kerepesi Cemetery, with a tombstone made by Miklós Ligeti. The Hungarian National Gallery today is in possession of some 30 of Zala's works. A commemorative plaque to Zala is embedded in the pavement outside his former villa in Budapest.
