= Mount Korek =

Mountain in the Kurdistan Region, Iraq

Korek
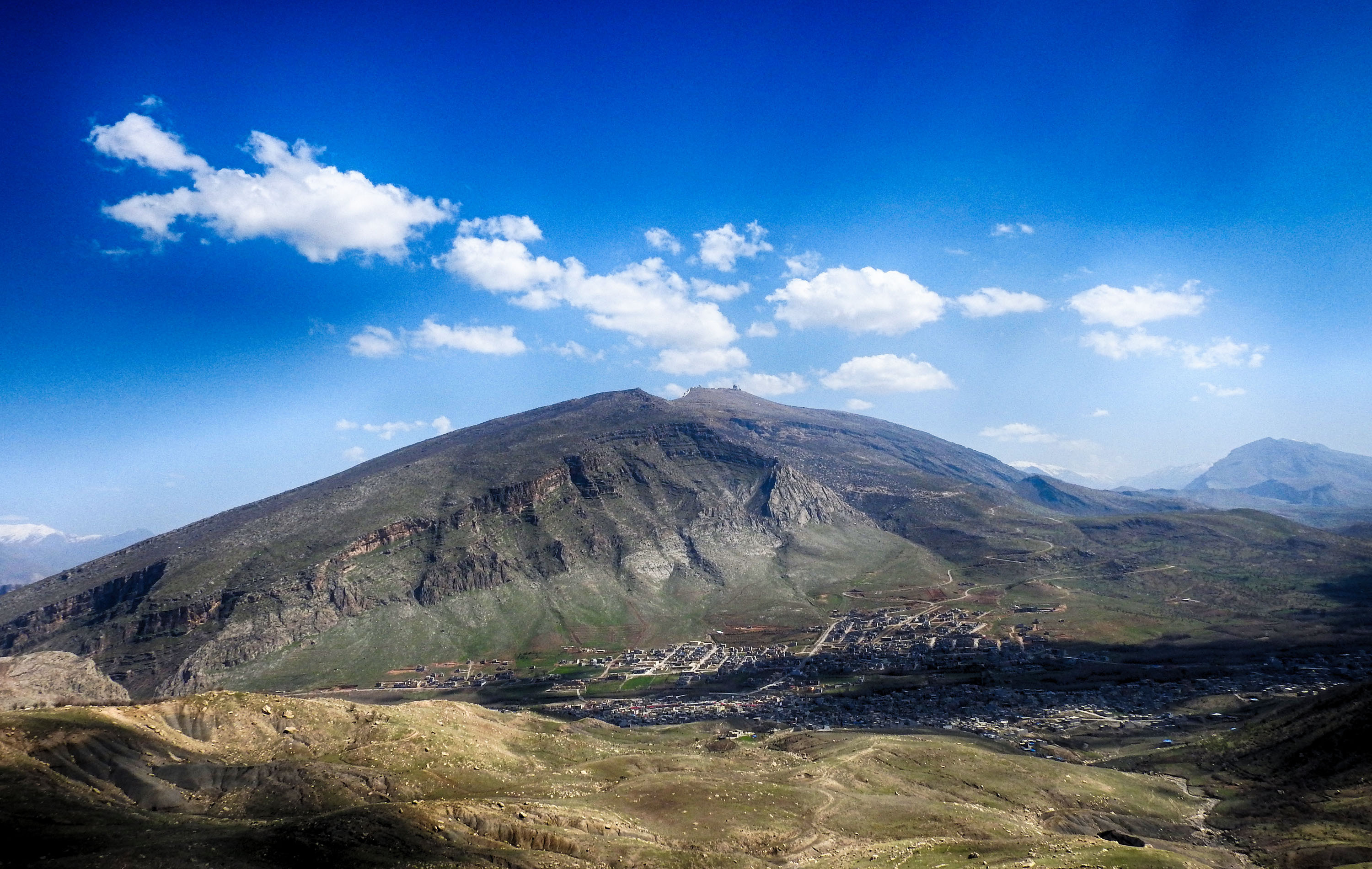

Highest point
- Elevation: 2,127 m (6,978 ft)
- Coordinates: 36°35′20″N 44°27′32″E

Geography
- Location within Iraq
- Location: Soran District, Erbil Governorate, Iraq
- Country: Iraq
- State: Erbil Governorate
- Region: Kurdistan Region
- District: Soran District

Mount Korek (Kurdish: Çîyayê Korek ,چیای کۆڕەک) is a mountain located in Erbil Governorate of the Kurdistan Region in Iraq, 50 kilometers away from the Iranian border.

== Observatory ==
In 1973, President Ahmed Hassan al-Bakr ordered the construction of the Erbil Observatory, a $160 million project intended to become the first major observatory in the Middle East. The observatory was planned to include two optical telescopes and one radio telescope.

In the early 1980s, approximately 400 workers from various German and Swiss manufacturers, including Baresel, Epple, Krupp, Liebherr, and Zeiss, constructed the three telescopes for the observatory. The project involved experts from ten countries. Harsh winters presented challenges, requiring extra safety measures. In late 1983, before construction was completed, tests were conducted on one of the optical telescopes. However, the construction of the observatory ceased during the Iran–Iraq War, leaving it unfinished and unusable. The observatory, which housed advanced radio sensing equipment, became a target of the Iranian military due to its proximity to the Iraq-Iran border, even though it was not intended for military use. The partly constructed observatory was damaged by Iranian missiles in 1985 and 1991. Despite the damage, it is believed that the observatory could potentially be repaired.

== Tourism ==
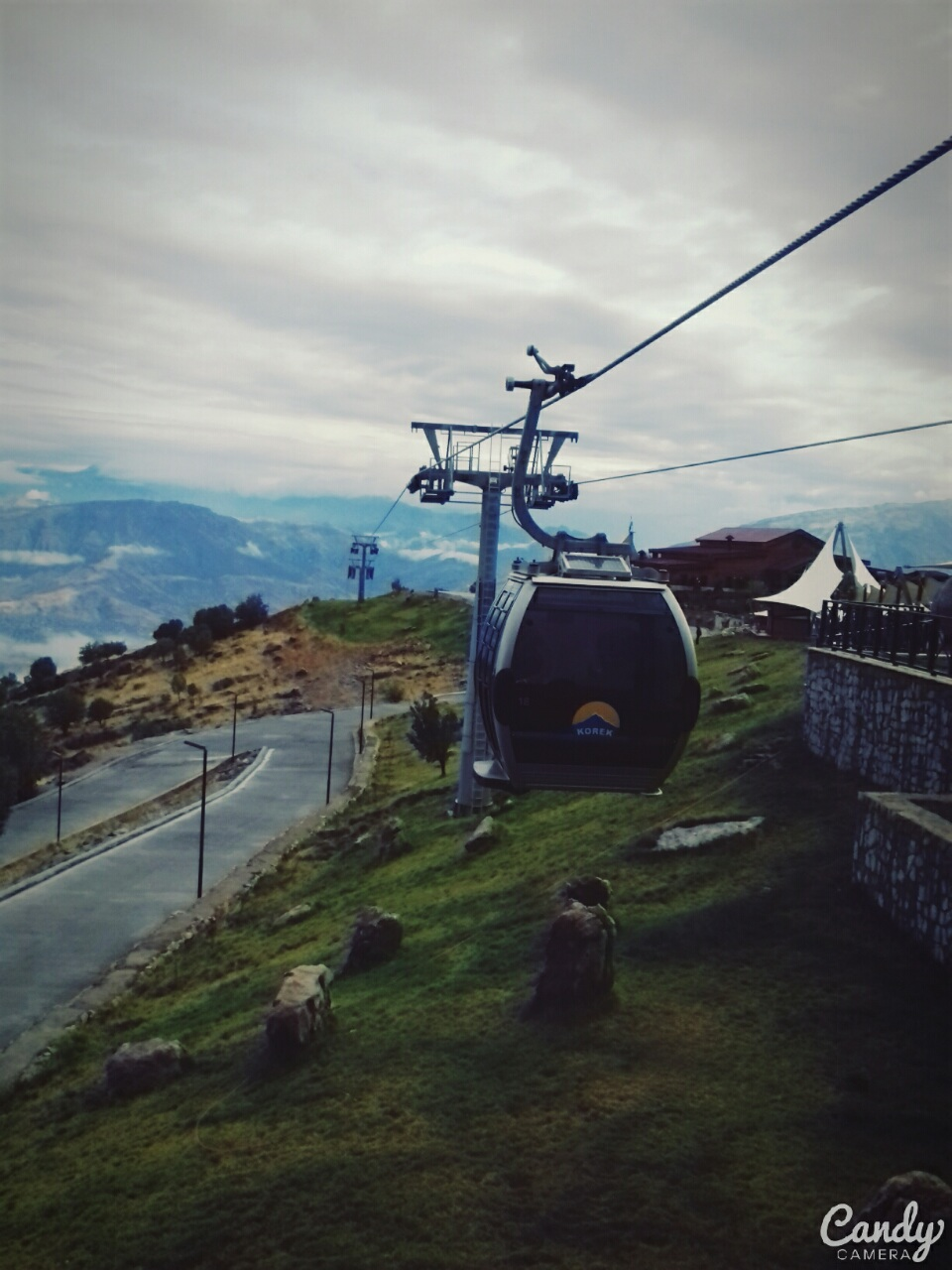
Korek Mountain Resort & Spa, The Teleferic

Mount Korek is a popular tourist destination, with the Darin Group, an Iraqi-Kurdish company, having built an approximately four-kilometer-long Doppelmayr teleferic (cable car) connecting the Bekhal bottom station to Mount Korek. The mountain area was developed to accommodate visitors, including 132 villas and various recreational facilities. This project is part of the Korek Mountain Resort & Spa. In addition to the villas, there are restaurants and cafes, and the resort serves as a cool summer retreat, offering relief from the hot temperatures in the surrounding region. During the winter months, the resort transforms into a ski destination.

The Korek Mountain Resort is considered one of the top destinations in the Kurdistan Region of Iraq.

== Weather ==
The mountain region experiences highly volatile and extreme weather conditions.

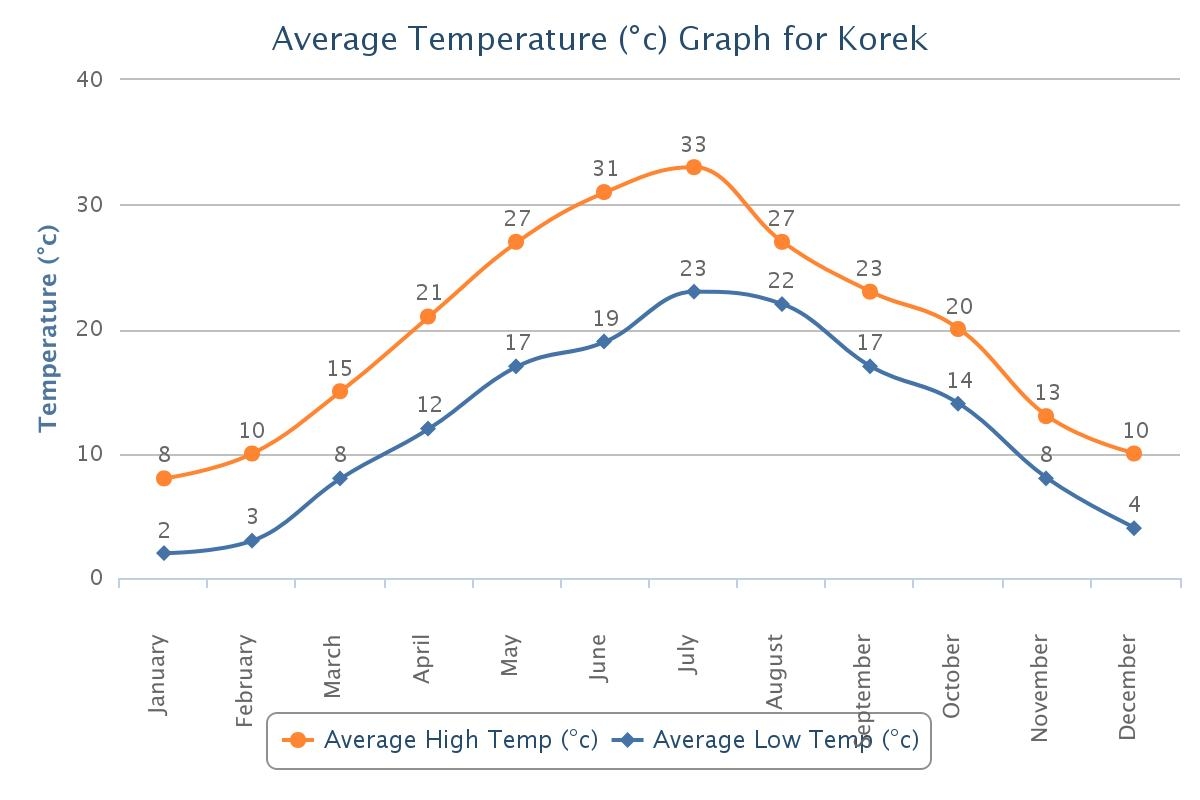

Temperature ranges from 2 °C to 33 °C, with the lowest recorded temperature being -14 °C.

Rainfall in the region ranges from 20 to 75 mm annually.

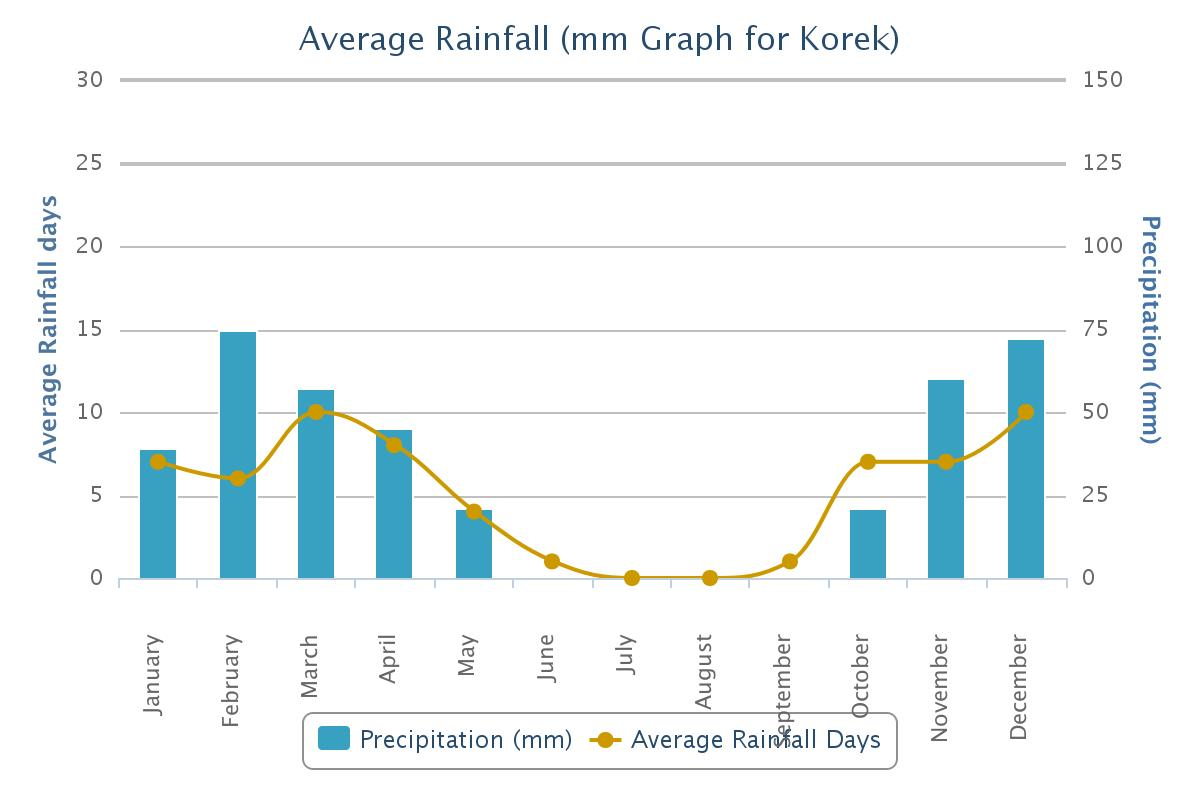

The area experiences between 60 and 100 days of snowfall annually, typically between December and March.

- Note: The data for the charts above were collected from 2000 to 2012.
