= May Kaftan-Kassim =

Iraqi radio astronomer (1928–2020)

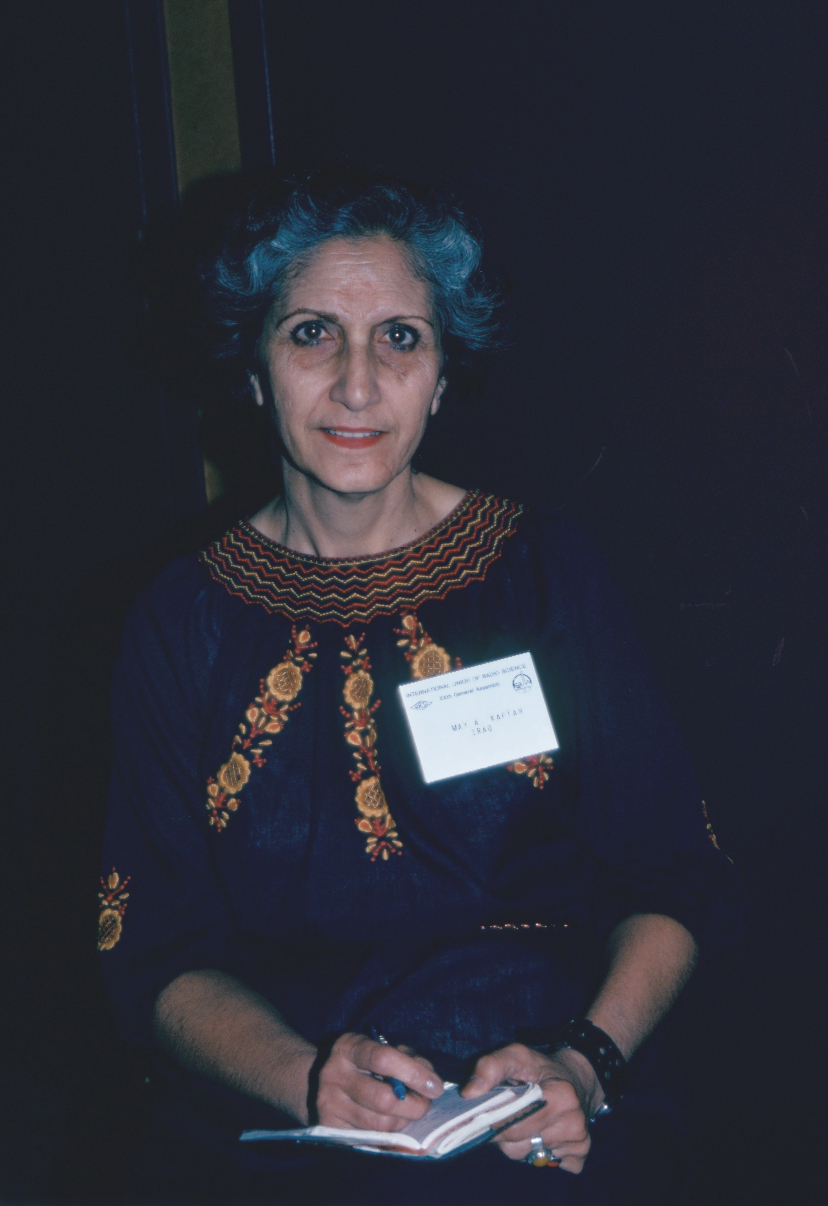
- Kaftan-Kassim in 1981
- Born: May Arif Kaftan; 1928; Iraq
- Died: July 23, 2020 (aged 91–92)
- Other names: Mai Arif Kaftan, Mai Kaftan Qasim
- Occupation: Astronomer

May Arif Kaftan-Kassim (1928 – July 23, 2020), also known as May A. Kaftan, was an Iraqi radio astronomer. She trained at Harvard University, and advised on the creation of the Erbil Observatory in Iraq in the 1970s.

== Early life ==
May Arif Kaftan came from a "fairly conventional, very religious Muslim family," by her own account. Her father was a government official. She attended the University of Manchester as an undergraduate and graduate student, on a scholarship for Iraqi students in the sciences. She completed her doctoral studies in astronomy at Radcliffe College in 1958, with a dissertation titled A study of neutral hydrogen in a region in Cygnus. American astronomers Nan Dieter-Conklin and Frank Drake were her classmates in astronomy at Harvard; they all finished in the same year, and all studied under Cecilia Payne-Gaposchkin.

== Career ==
Kaftan-Kassim worked at the National Radio Astronomy Observatory in West Virginia, from 1964 to 1966. In 1968, she attended the United Nations Conference on the Exploration and Peaceful Uses of Outer Space (COPUOS), in Vienna, informally representing Iraq. She was on staff at the Dudley Observatory at the State University of New York at Albany in the early 1970s. While attending the annual URSI meeting in Washington D.C. in 1981, Kaftan-Kassim gave an oral history interview for the National Radio Astronomy Observatory archives. She was a visiting professor of astronomy at Agnes Scott College, 1983–1984.

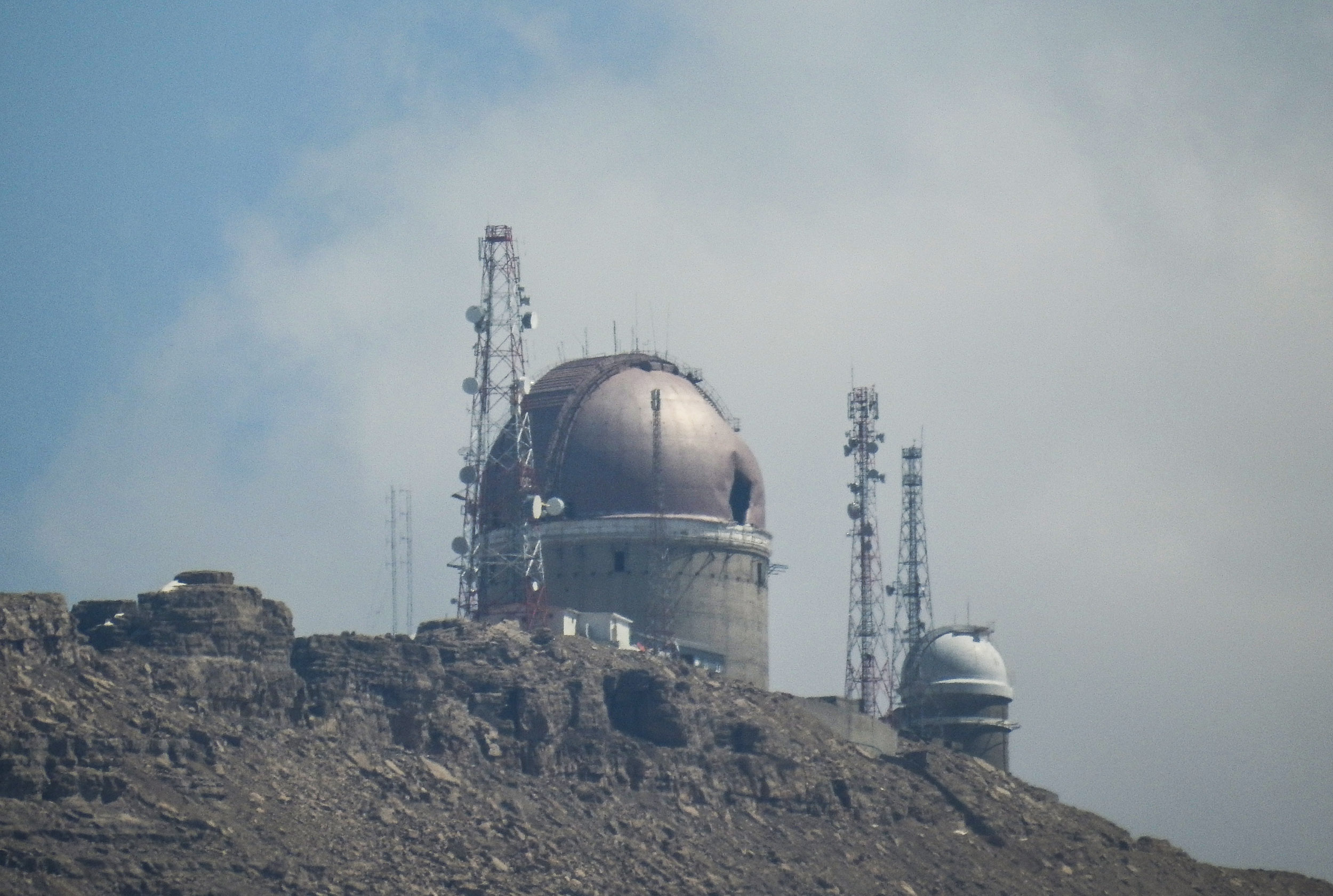
Erbil Observatory, which Kaftan-Kassim helped launch in the 1970s.

Kaftan-Kassim helped establish the astronomy program at the University of Baghdad, advising on texts and hiring. She returned to Baghdad in the mid-1970s to advise on the construction of Iraq's National Astronomical Observatory, near Erbil, and was a project manager there, before she lost her position in 1981 in a shifting political context. "I came back with the understanding that it would be six months here, six months there," she explained to an American newspaper in 1979, "but there is so much to do I can't go back to the States." She spent some time doing research at the Byurakan Astrophysical Observatory in the Soviet Union. She did, eventually, return to the United States to live. The American Astronomical Society listed her as a member for over 60 years in 2017.

Research publications by Kaftan-Kassim included "Measurements of the 1.9 cm Thermal Radio Emission from Mercury" (Nature 1967), "A Survey of High-Frequency Radio Radiation from Planetary Nebulae" (Astrophysical Journal 1969), "High Frequency Radio Observations of the Stephan's Quintet Region" (Nature 1975), "Extinction and Radio Structure of IC 2149" (Monthly Notices of the Royal Astronomical Society 1977), and "A Radio Continuum Survey of Isolated Pairs of Galaxies" (Astronomical Journal 1978).

== Personal life ==
Kaftan married pediatrician Sami El-Sheikh Kassim; they separated in the 1970s. Their son Namir E. Kassim was born in Baghdad; he also became a radio astronomer in the United States. May Kaftan-Kassim died in 2020.
