= Emil Julius Epple =

German sculptor

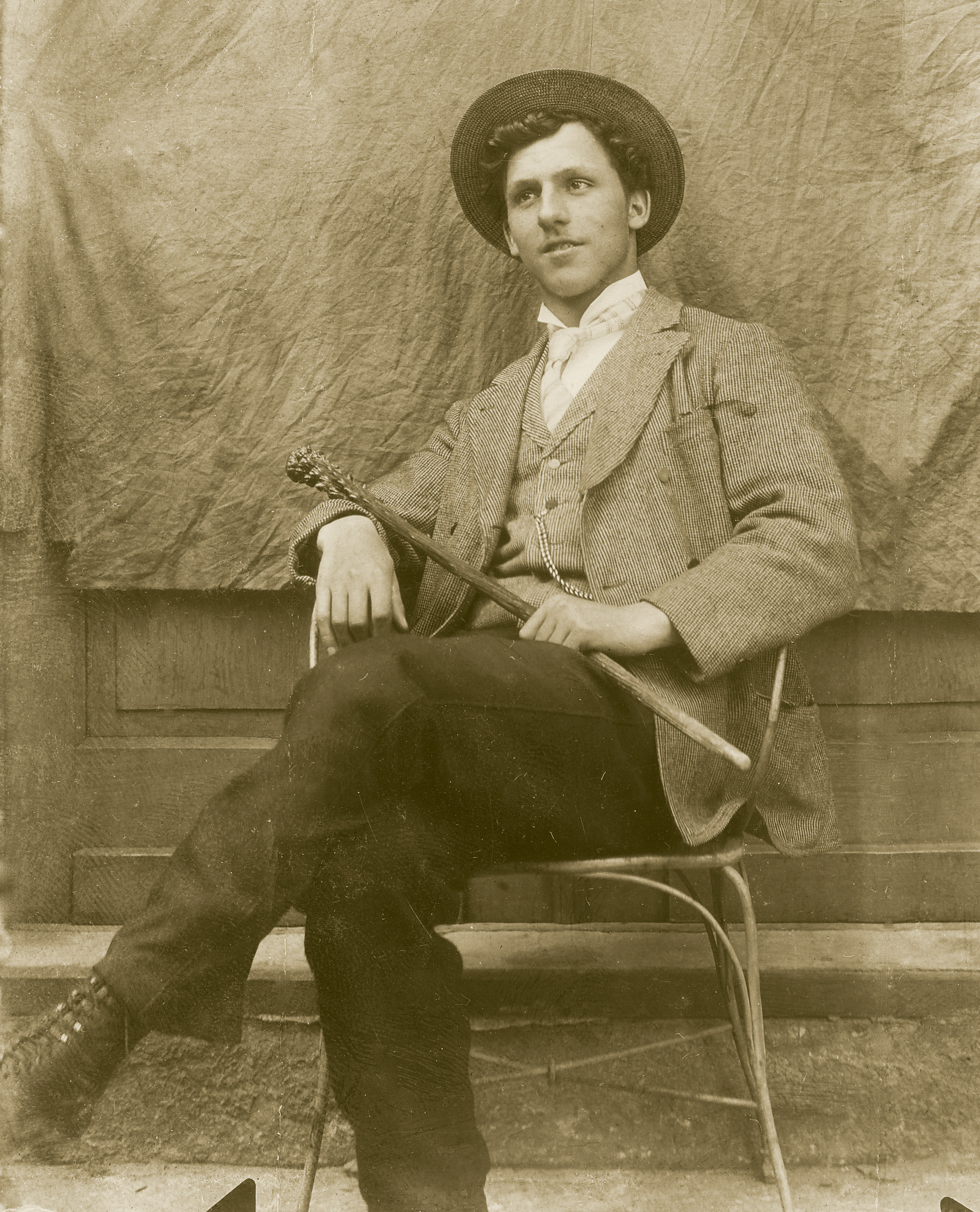
- Self portrait, Emil Epple, 1893
- Born: 6 March 1877; Stuttgart
- Died: 25 February 1948 (aged 70); The Hague
- Known for: Sculpture, drawing

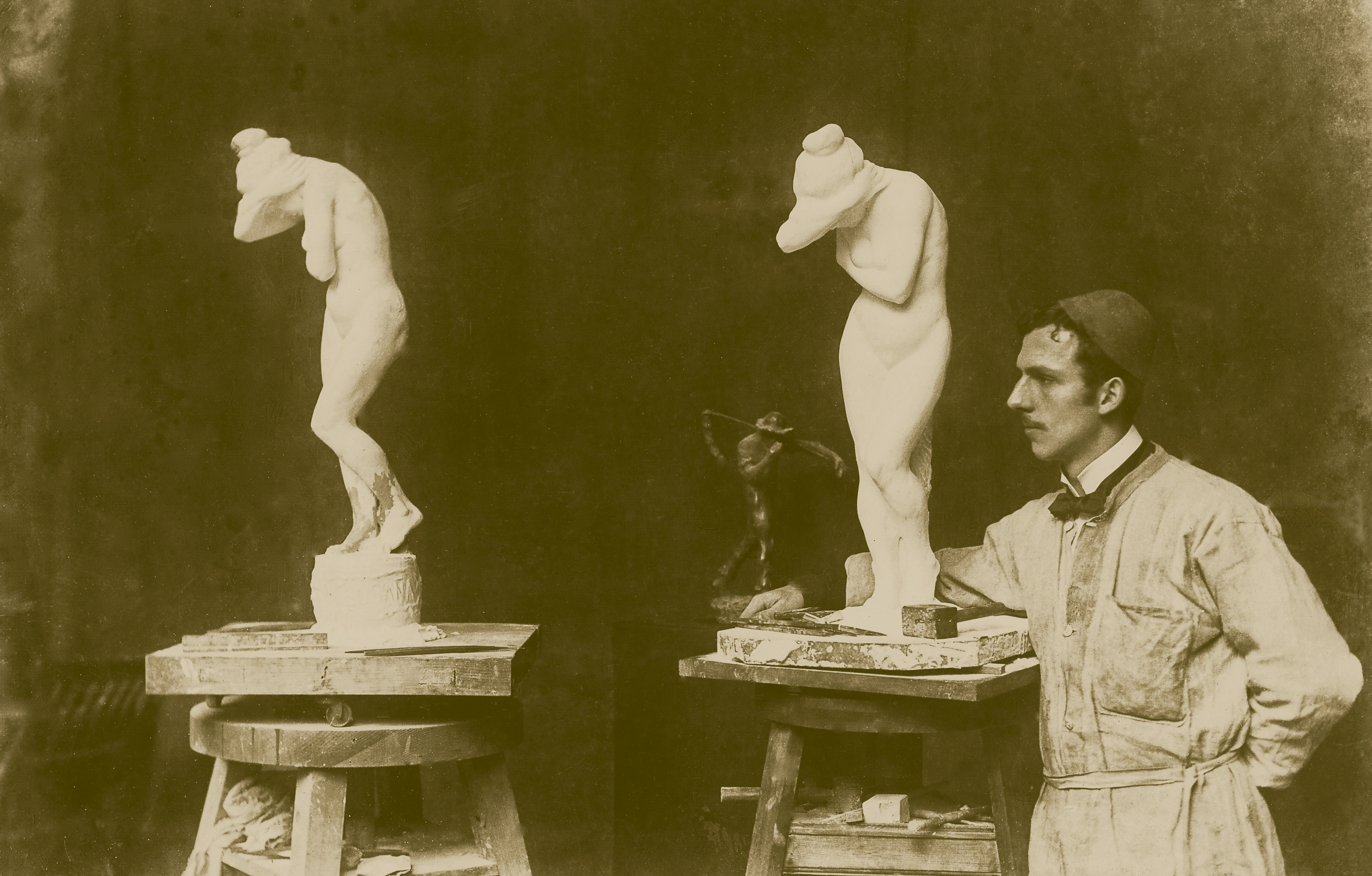
Marble Susanna with Epple, 1899

Emil Julius Epple (6 March 1877 – 25 February 1948) was a German sculptor working mainly in Italy and southern Germany. In 1937, he moved to the Netherlands, becoming a Dutch citizen after the Second World War.

== Biography ==
=== Youth ===
Emil Epple was born in the Swabian city of Stuttgart. He grew up in a traditional evangelical teachers family, believed to be of Swiss origin.

=== Education and early career ===
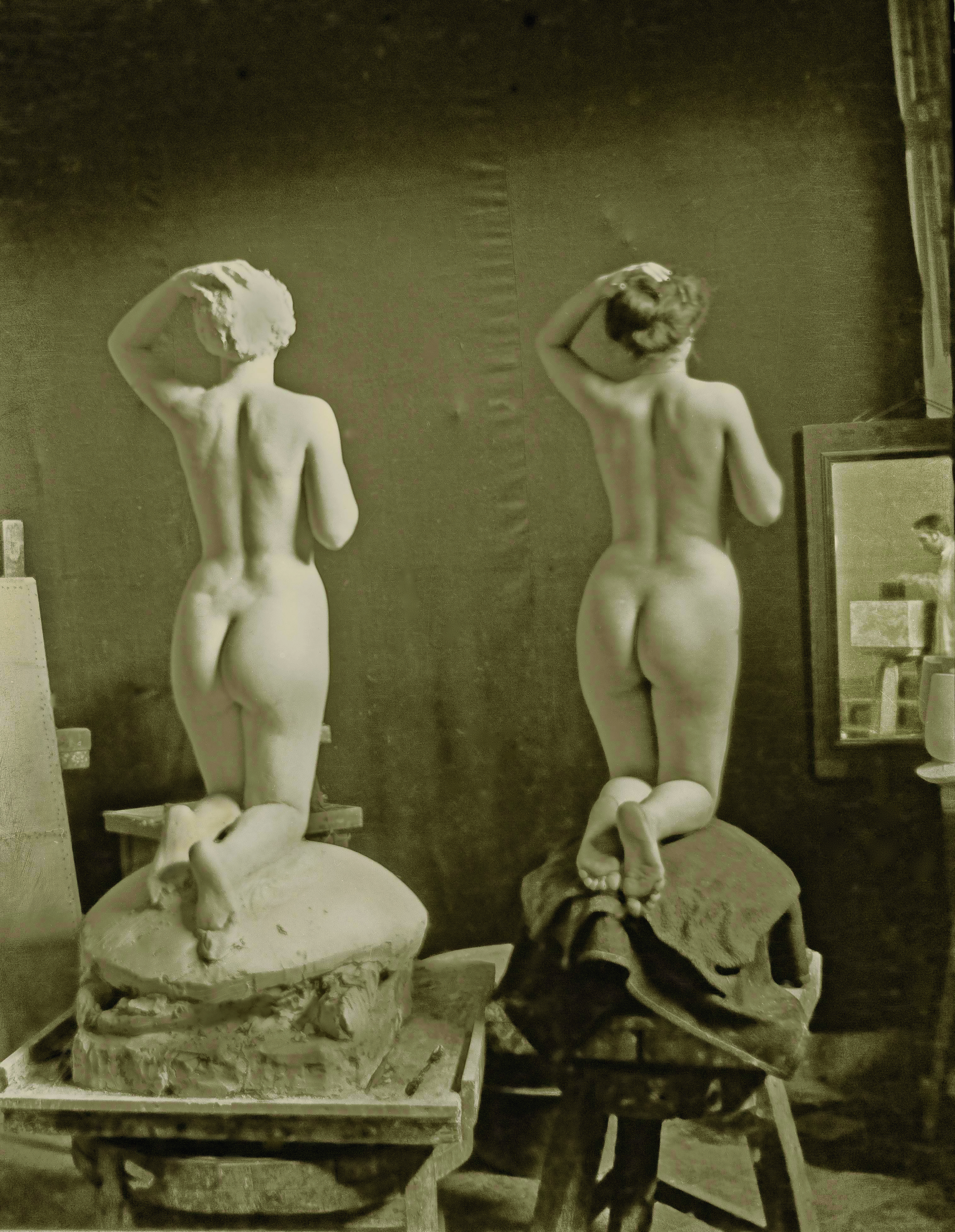
Model and sculpture of Anadyomene, 1902

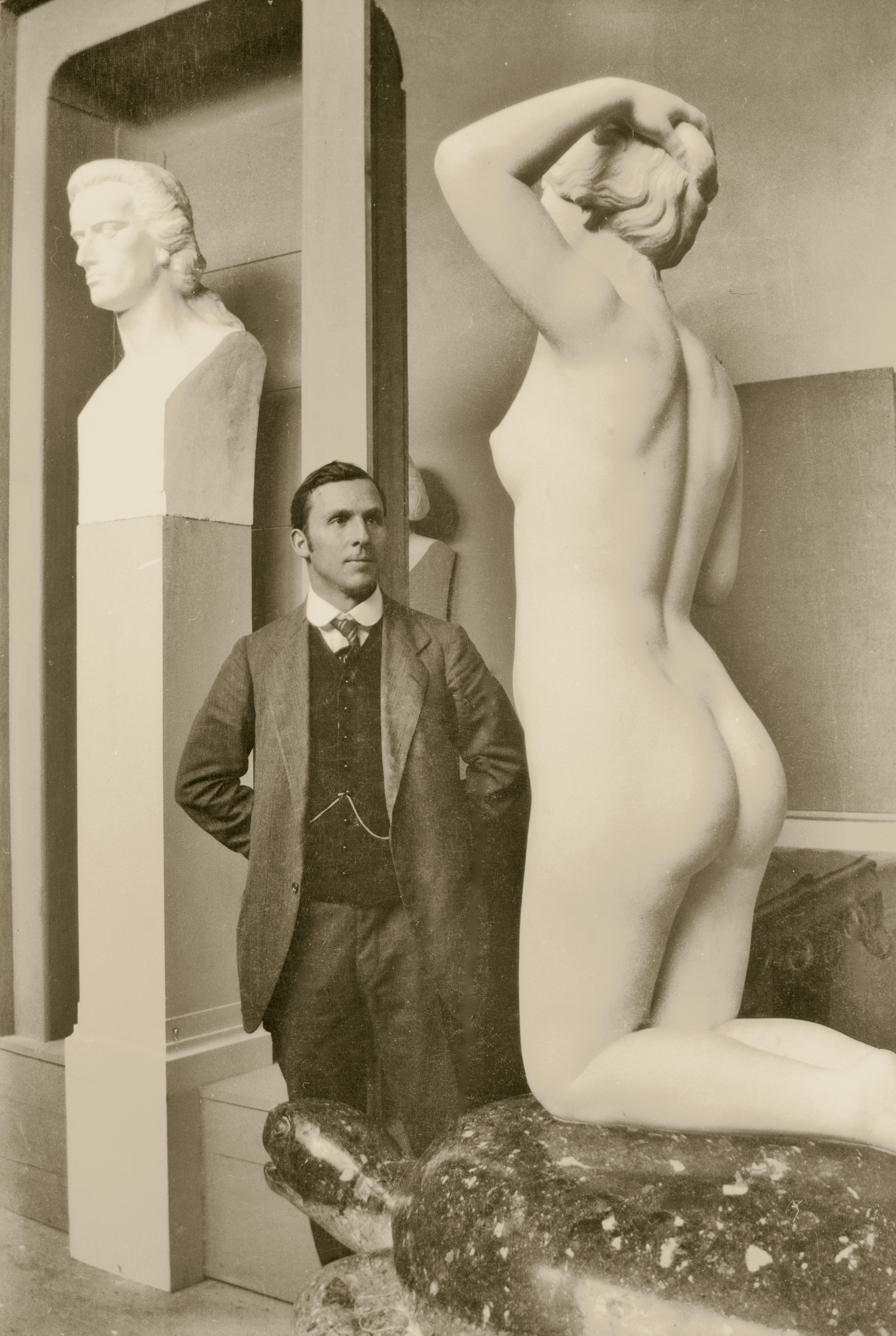
Epple with Anadyomene and Schiller, 1912

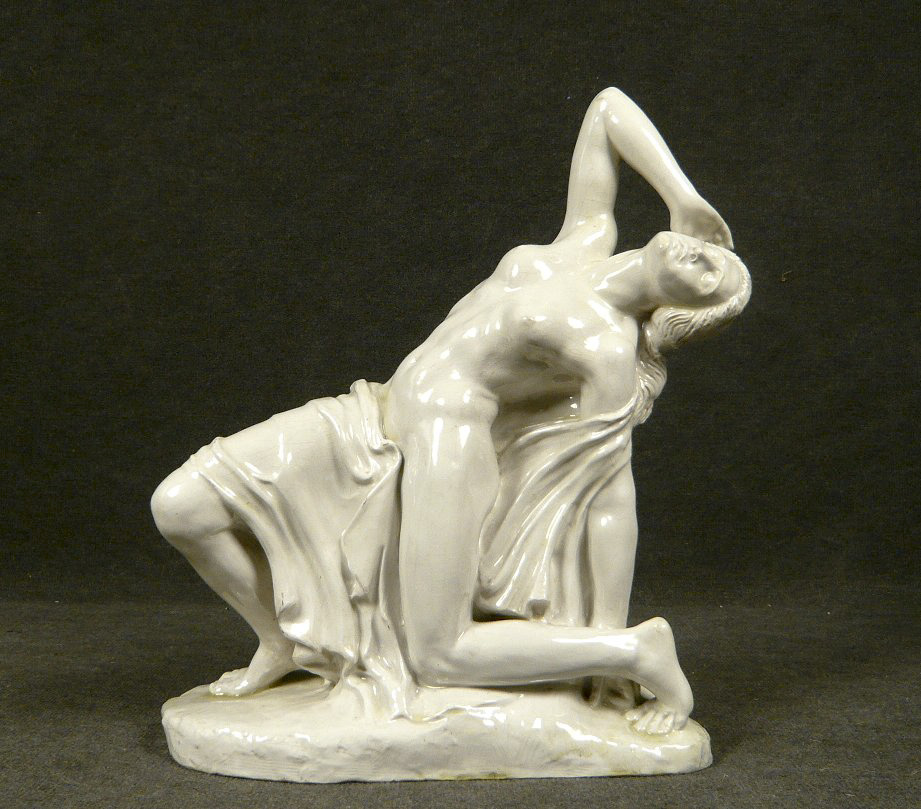
Dying Amazone, 1918

Epple went to the local gymnasium and subsequently to the Stuttgarter Kunstschule (Art School). There, he studied for a couple of years under professor Adolf von Donndorf, before moving to Munich, following classes, from April 1896 onward, at the Akademie der Bildenden Künste by professor Wilhelm von Rümann.

After a short stay in Stuttgart and Berlin, Epple looked for inspiration in London. In the British Museum, he carefully studied the Elgin Marbles, a collection of Classical Greek marble sculptures made under the supervision of architect and sculptor Phidias (c. 480 – 430 BC).

In 1899, Epple went to Rome, where he would stay till 1907. To support himself, he repaired and restored Classical Roman and Greek art objects. In Rome, both Italy's natural environment and the innumerable Classical art treasuries definitively shaped Epple's own sense of art and Classical predilection. He would develop a highly personal style that many art critics and art lovers would quickly recognize and appreciate. In 1900, Epple had his first exhibition in Munich.

Having lived and worked for almost a decade in Rome, Epple moved to Munich. In the Bavarian capital he was asked to make six more than life-size herms of Wagner, Shakespeare, Goethe, Schiller, Mozart, and Beethoven for the Royal Stuttgart Hoftheater. During this period, he also created numerous portraits, memorials, and reliefs, often working closely with other artists and architects such as Albert Eitel and Eugen Steigleder, making the Villa Gemmingen in Stuttgart into a unique "Gesamtkunstwerk", that is still highly praised. Many works were commissioned by private industrialist, bankers or professionals, as well as by government institutions such as the Landespolizei (Bavarian Police), for whom he made an impressive statue for its fallen officers.

=== Marriages ===
On 21 August 1901, Emil Epple married Johanna Groneman, the daughter of a Dutch high school director in the northern city of Groningen and well known singing teacher Jacoba Kappeyne van de Coppello. She had studied in Munich and Berlin. From 1894 onward, she would regularly and successfully give concerts, performing as a highly appreciated soprano, along with her two sisters Frederika and Goswina and their mother. At the same time, she would advertise herself as a singing master and concert singer in local newspapers. Their marriage was to remain childless. They divorced in 1919, shortly after Emil's return from the Great War. Epple would remarry on 17 May 1921 with Hendrika de Witt Huberts, the daughter of a prominent Major-General and the daughter of a wealthy Dutch industrialist family. One year after their wedding, a daughter was born, called Eleonora (‘Lorle’).

=== First World War ===
At the outbreak of the Great War, Epple was declared unfit to serve in the German army. However, the next year he volunteered for military service and was soon dispatched in the Royal Bavarian 7. Feldartillerie-Regiment „Prinzregent Luitpold“ as a cannoneer to the Western front. He would fight on the German-French font from Verdun to the Somme.

In 1918, Emil Epple returned from the Great War, a broken and numbed man (“vollkommen verblödet” [completely gone gaga] in his own words). Now a dismissed army officer, he found himself paralyzed at both arms for more than a year, making it impossible for him to work marble or other stones with his chisels. That year, he mainly worked with wax, as the basis for bronze cast statues. Eventually he recovered quite well and would become extremely productive again in the 1920s.

In 1919, Johanna and he separated. Johanna would return to the Netherlands and work partly as a translator of German children's books, including Die Biene Maya und ihre Abenteuer (Maya the Bee; 1920), by German bestselling author and anti-Semite Waldemar Bonsels. In the early 1930s she seems to have sympathized with the national-socialist ideology and lived shortly in Holland, Switzerland and Austria. Next, she seems to have disappeared in the fogs of history.

=== Interbellum ===
In 1921, Epple was back in the Netherlands, where financial conditions for artists were much more favourable than in anarchic, inflation-stricken, post-war Germany. An exhibition of contemporary German art was organized in the Amsterdam Stedelijk Museum, the most prestigious museum of contemporary art in the Netherlands, by De Onafhankelijken (The Independents). This group of artists was inspired by the Parisian Les Indépendants, striving to hold unjuried exhibitions, bypassing the established art institutions. Along with German expressionists such as Max Pechstein, Alexej von Jawlensky and Erich Heckel, Epple participated in the exhibition with drawings, paintings and sculptures.

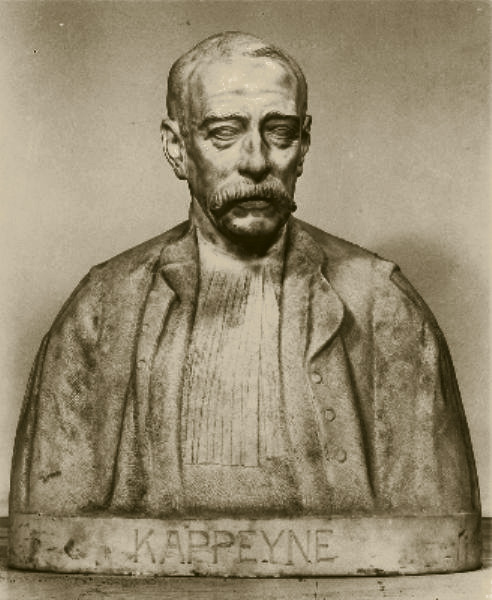
Kappeyne, 1921

On 6 February 1921, a marble bust by Epple of Dutch Senator Jacobus Kappeyne de Capello, his former wife's uncle, was unveiled in the Stedelijk Museum. The bust is still on display in the hall of the Dutch Parliament in The Hague. In 1928, Epple was nominated Professor honoris causa by the Reichsakademie München, having just completed four huge statues for the Saint Josephospital. After the rise to power by Adolf Hitler as Reichskanzler on 30 January 1933, and, subsequently, the suspension of civil rights, the increase in paramilitary violence, the Enabling Act, turning Hitler's government into a dictatorship, and the utterly racist Nuremberg Laws in 1935, Epple had his family moved to the Netherlands.

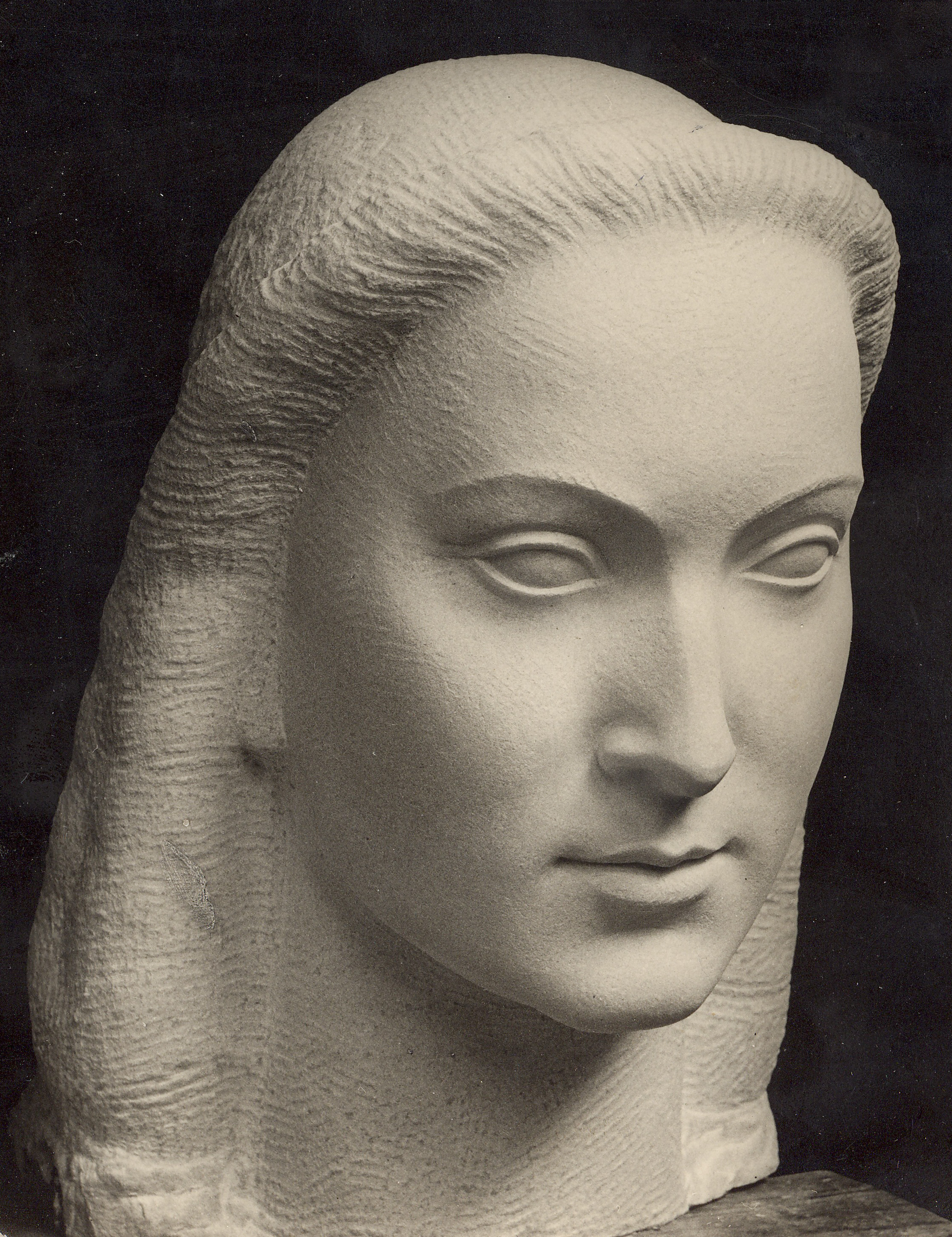
Deutsche Mutter (German Mother), 1935

In July 1936, he was still able to publish an article in the popular German art magazine Die Kunst für Alle, explaining how, as a sculptor with his chisels and stippling technique, he "awoke the image, sleeping in the stone". His essay was illustrated with four pictures showing various stages of his work at a sculpture called Deutsche Mutter (German Mother).

In Nazi Germany, Epple had refused to become a member of the Nazi Party and the Reichskulturkammer, a Nazi-led professional organization requiring all German creative artists to register as members and to propagate National-Socialist ideology in their work. His refusal meant that he was no longer given government assignments and that his work was seen, even in retrospect, as un-German, even "Entartet" ("degenerate"). Another reason for Epple to leave Germany and to choose a life in the Netherlands, was his reluctance to see his only daughter grow up in an inescapable social environment dominated by National-Socialist organizations such as Hitler Jugend and Bund deutscher Mädel.

In 1937, he applied for Dutch citizenship. The same year, a sick and disillusioned man, Emil Epple left Germany for good, leaving many unfinished works and valuables behind, including his villa in Munich.

=== Final years ===
During the Second World War, the Zandvoort villa of Epple's in-laws was razed to the ground by the occupying Nazis to make room for Atlantikwall-bunkers and Flak. Emil Epple and his family moved to The Hague. After the war, the Epples were compensated for this loss and were allowed to build a new villa, this time in the Limburg village of Geulle, in the southern part of the Netherlands. They called it "Beeldenhof" (Statue Garden). Emil did not live to see its completion; he died in The Hague on 25 February 1948. A drawing and death mask were made by his friend Chris de Moor.

== Work and style ==
Emil Epple was anything but an uncritical epigone of the famous sculptors of his age, such as Auguste Rodin and Adolf von Hildebrand or, later, the French sculptor Aristide Maillol, who would greatly influence German sculpture in the first half of the 20th century. He soon managed to come out of their shadows and find his own way. He developed is own style that many art critics can quickly recognize.

=== Periods ===
Epple's work can be divided into three periods:

1. Italian period (Rome, ca. 1898 – 1908)
2. German period (München, ca. 1909 – 1935)
3. Dutch period (The Hague, ca. 1935 – 1948)

=== Working method ===
Emil Epple would be known for his superb “direct carving technique". In this method, sculptors work with hammer and chisel that come into direct contact with a block of stone, giving the sculptor close and intimate contact with the material. The artist will consult merely a rough sketch on paper, a photo or clay model, but does not do a lot of measuring nor use a carefully worked out preliminary model. Gradually, the sculpture emerges from the stone. Although this technique enhances the spontaneity of the creation process, the sculptor also risks making fatal errors. Other sculptors who became famous for using this technique include Constantin Brâncuși, Barbara Hepworth and Henry Moore.

== Distinctions ==
In 1912, Epple was awarded a Knight's Order First Class for Arts and Sciences by King Wilhelm II of Württemberg for the six herms he made in the Royal Stuttgart Hoftheater.

Iron Cross, 1918.

Professor honoris causa, Reichsakademie München, 1928.

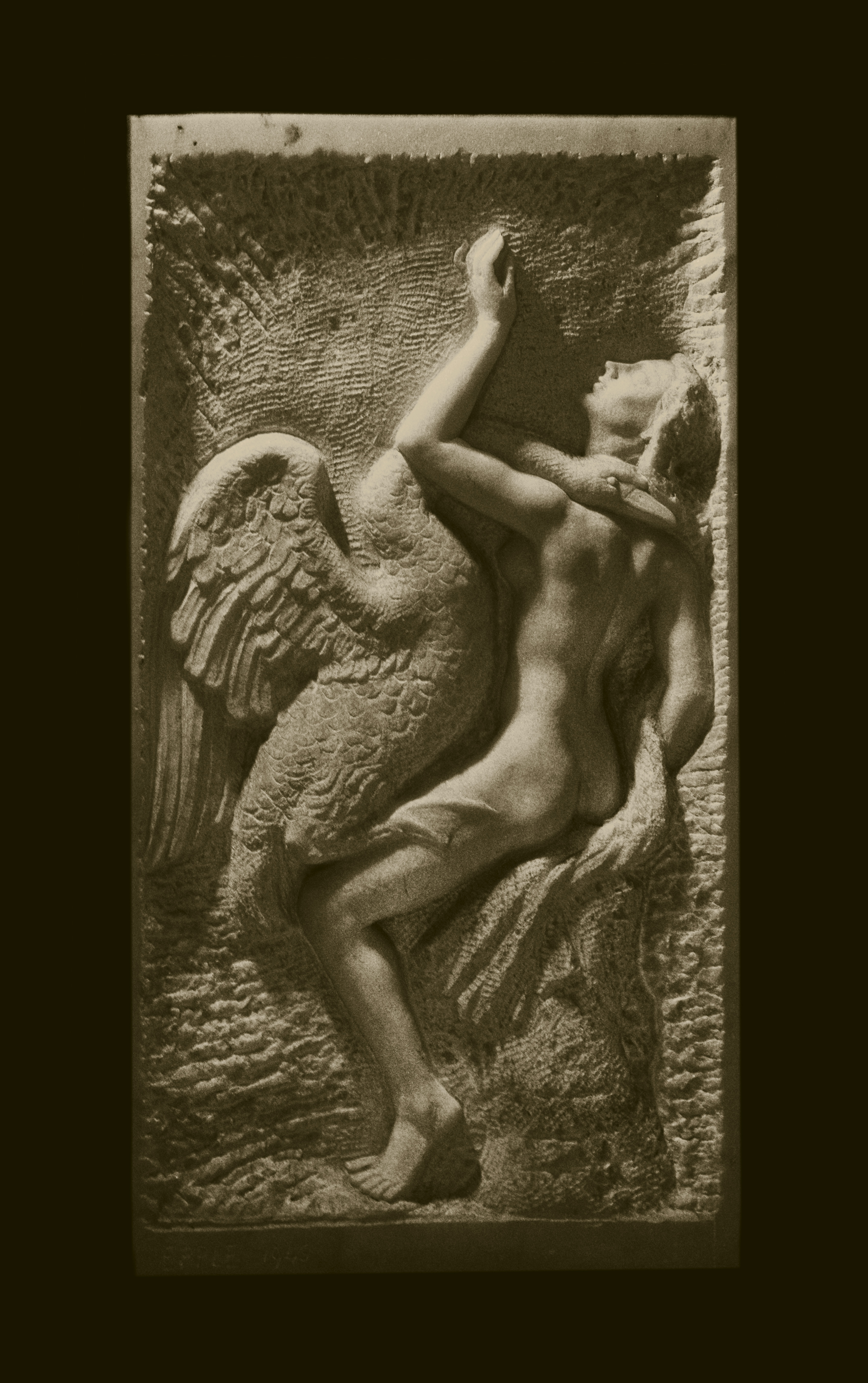
Leda and the swan, 1943

== Exhibitions ==
A selection of exhibitions in Germany:

1. 1900, First exhibition in Munich Glaspalast.
2. 1907, Galerie Schulte in Berlin.
3. 1923, Galerie Paulus in München.
4. 1926, Galerie Thannhauser, München.

A selection of exhibitions in the Netherlands:

1. 1921, Exhibition “Independents” in Stedelijk Museum Amsterdam.
2. 1947, Exhibition in Vondelpark on the occasion of Epple's 70th birthday.

== Revaluation ==
The Sculpture Institute of Museum Beelden aan Zee publishes Sculptuur Studies (Sculpture research), a yearly periodical, containing essays about modern and contemporary sculpture. In 2017 Sculptuur Studies published an article (in Dutch) about Emil Epple based on research done by Marjet van de Weerd (MA). The article highlights new facts about the work and life of Emil Epple, as well as his political-social situation. In 2018 her publication 'Love and Art' was published. In this richly illustrated book Epples life is described in the cultural-artistic and social context of his time, in which he worked as a passionate artist with his life motto: Amor et Ars regnant.
