= Epple =

Epple is a surname. Notable people with the name include:

- Bob Epple (1948–2011), American attorney and politician
- Dennis Epple, US American economist and professor of economics
- Emil Julius Epple (1877–1948), German sculptor
- Irene Epple (born 1957), German alpine skier
- Maria Epple (born 1959), German alpine skier
- Moritz Epple (born 1960), German mathematician and historian of science

== See also ==
- Epple bay, Kent, England
- Ludwig Epple House, historic home in New Harmony, Indiana, US
