= Michael Wagmüller =

German sculptor

Michael Wagmüller RBA
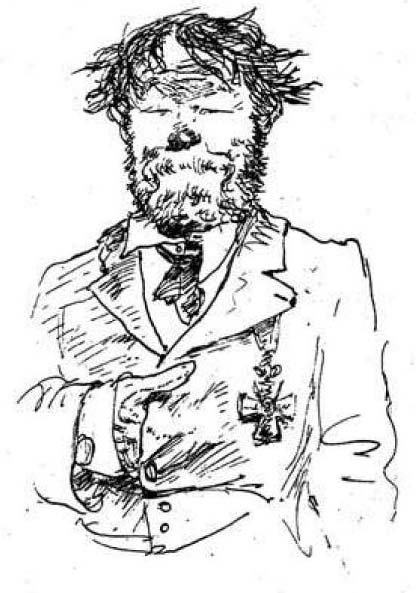
- 1878 caricature by Friedrich August von Kaulbach
- Born: 1839
- Died: 1881 (aged 41–42)
- Occupation: Sculptor

Michael Wagmüller (1839–1881) was a German sculptor who completed a number of commissions in London and exhibited at the Royal Academy.

Wagmuller was born in Regensberg, Germany, and studied at the industrial school in Munich, then at the Academy of Fine Arts there. After returning from London to Munich he worked as a professor at the academy.
