= Ludwig Gies =

German sculptor (1887–1966)

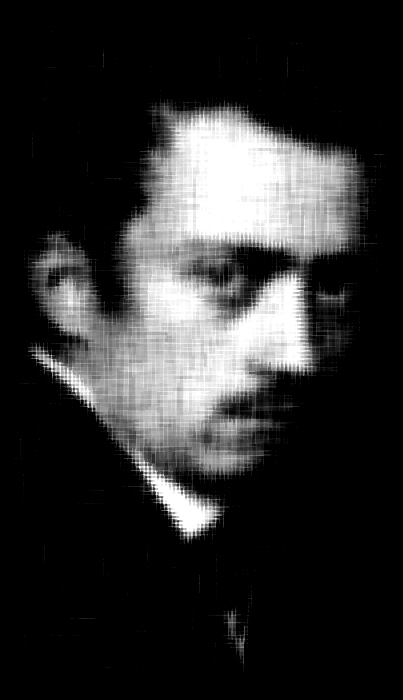
- Born: 3 September 1887; Munich, German Empire
- Died: 27 January 1966 (aged 78); Cologne, West Germany
- Known for: Sculpture, Medal engraving

Ludwig Gies (3 September 1887 – 27 January 1966) was a German sculptor, medallist and professor of art. He is best known for his crucifix in Lübeck Cathedral, vandalized in March 1922 and later considered a typical work of degenerate art, and his famous Federal Eagle (also known as the "Gies Eagle", or "Fat Hen") (1953), which is hung at the front of the Plenary Hall of the Reichstag in Berlin.

== Life and work ==
=== 1887 to 1918 ===
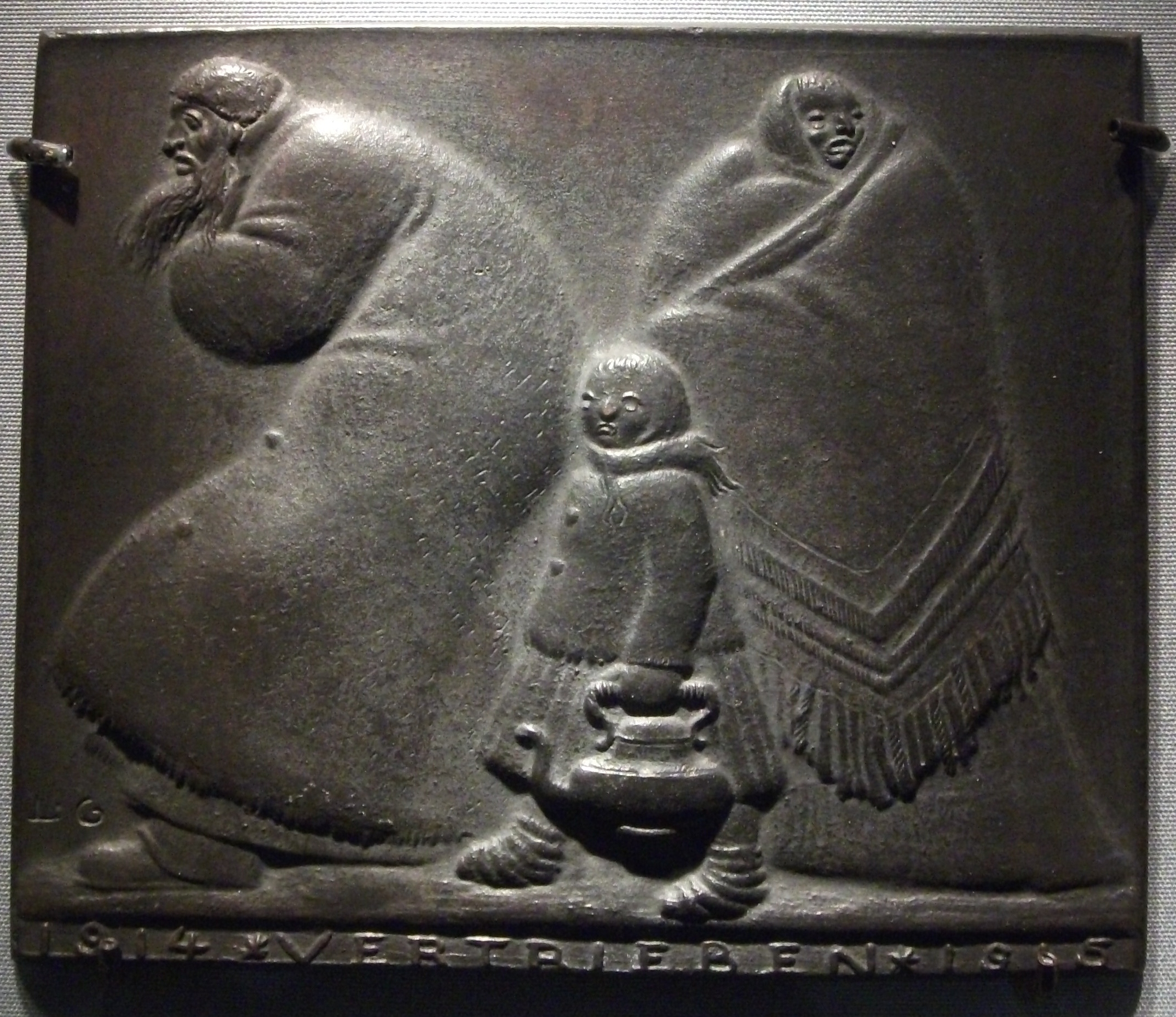
Ludwig Gies, cast iron, 8 x 9.8 cm, inscribed "1914·VERTRIEBEN·1915" = "Refugees 1914–1915"

Gies was born in Munich, the older of the two sons of Philip Gies and his wife Johanna (née Grieb). A third child died young, and the father died in 1915. Gies's education is poorly documented: it is uncertain whether he attended secondary school (Realschule) or just eight years of primary school. It is definite, however. that he did not attend a grammar school. Gies attended the Municipal Trade School (Städtische Gewerbeschule) in Munich from 1902 to 1904. Besides school, Ludwig was an apprentice at the business of Winhart & Co., where he learned chasing under Johann Vierthaler. At the same time, he attended evening and Sunday classes in modelling and wood carving, which brought Gies into early contact with Richard Riemerschmid and Bruno Paul.

After Ludwig Gies finished at the Municipal Trade School halfway through his training at Winhart's, he attended, up until July 1907, the Royal School of Applied Arts (Königliche Kunstgewerbeschule) in Munich, where he learned chasing, enamelling, carving and ornamental modelling and figurative modelling with Fritz von Miller, Anton Pruska, Maximilian Dasio and Heinrich Waderé. The influence of Waderé, who introduced Gies to medal making, was particularly significant.

In the summer of 1906, after Gies had completed his studies at the Kunstgewerbeschule and at Winhart's, and had spent a few months in Mindelheim in order to learn how to work in copper, he was employed at Winhart's until 1908 as a chaser. In May 1908, he enrolled at the Academy of Fine Arts in Munich (Akademie der Bildenden Künste München). Gies presumably studied sculpture there for four semesters until 1910. The reasons why he so quickly abandoned his studies are unclear. There is evidence that in 1909 he was again working at Winhart's and also returned there in 1912 as a freelance artist. In the years to 1914, he began a stylistic self-discovery and won several awards, primarily for new developments in medal working. A collaboration with the Nymphenburg Porcelain Manufactory extended his capabilities of dealing with ceramics such as majolica. A ceramic furnace came out of the experience, which attracted attention at the Swiss National Exhibition, Berne, in 1914. Shortly afterwards, World War I broke out, in which Gies did not participate as a combatant for reasons of health but was conscripted for labour. In his works of this period, he distanced himself from patriotism and represented the suffering of war, which led to a partial censorship of his works.

=== 1918 to 1945 ===
On 28 August 1917, Bruno Paul, the head of the teaching institute of the Museum of Decorative Arts Berlin, made a business trip to Munich to see various sculptures. With the departure of Joseph Wackerle, a position had fallen vacant that particularly dealt with the art of medals. During this trip, Paul met Gies. Exactly why this meeting had the consequence of Paul calling Gies to work at the teaching institute is not entirely clear: it is possible both that Paul had received beforehand the recommendation to look closer at Gies, especially as Munich medal work had a particularly good reputation, and also that Paul had come across Gies through publications in this field. It is conceivable that Paul remembered Gies from the time when Paul himself had been employed at Winhart & Co. (around 1902), although given the shortness of time he spent there and the years between the two events, this seems unlikely.

In Berlin, Gies led the class in die-cutting and modelling for goldsmiths and chasers, and from 1924, at the United State Schools for Fine and Applied Arts (Vereinigte Staatsschulen für Freie und Angewandte Kunst, now Universität der Künste Berlin), the modelling class. Hilde Broer was a student of his at the United State Schools. After the takeover of the Nazis, he came under pressure for his loyalty to dissident and Jewish students: in 1937 he was forced out of the Prussian Academy of Arts, and in 1938, dismissed from his teaching position. In protest, Gies' student, the sculptor Kurt Schumacher, left the Prussian Academy as well.

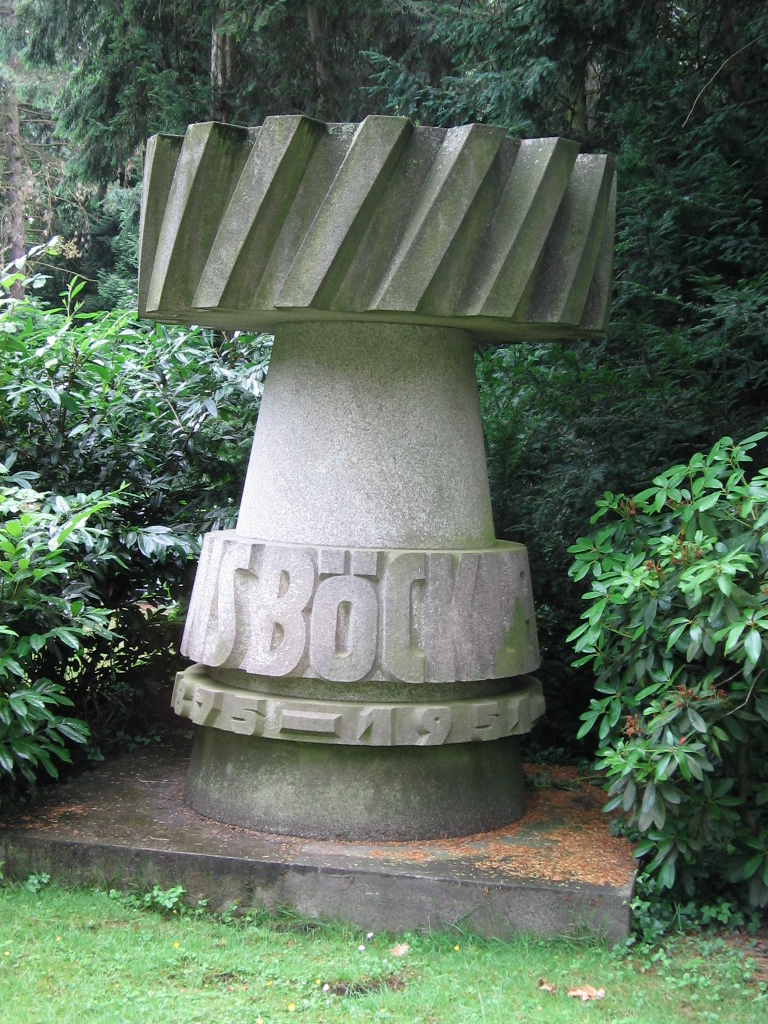
Gravestone of Hans Böckler in the Melaten Cemetery, Cologne, designed by Gies

Nevertheless, Gies also created for the 1935–1939 extension to the Reichsbank (otherwise known as the Haus am Werderschen Markt), among other things, an Imperial eagle with oak wreath and swastika, made of light metal. Eleven of his works were confiscated by the Nazis. His crucifix in Lübeck Cathedral, originally commissioned by Carl Georg Heise in 1921, the director of St. Anne's Museum, for St. Mary's Church, Lübeck, was already condemned at the time of its creation as "over-Expressionistic" ("überexpressionistisch") and as "culturally Bolshevist" ("kultur-bolschewistisch"), and was later one of the objects of hatred of the Entartete Kunst ("Degenerate Art") exhibition of 1937 in Munich, where it was ostentatiously displayed in the stairwell. It was probably subsequently destroyed. The crucifix had already been the object of an attack on 3 March 1922 in Lübeck Cathedral, in which the head of Christ and one of the rays were struck off with professional competence. The head was found in a nearby mill pond and the sculpture was thus reconstructed.

=== 1945 to 1966 ===
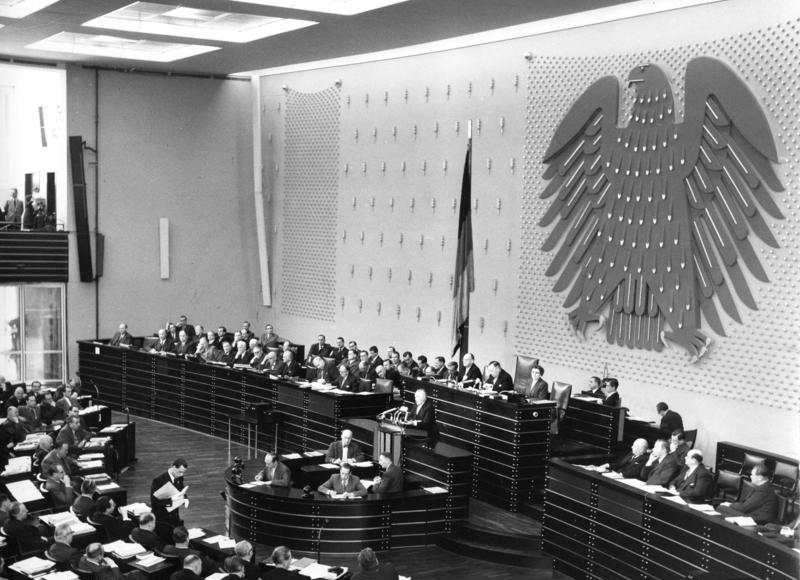
Gies' eagle, the "Fat Hen", Bundestag in the Bundeshaus in Bonn

After the end of World War II, he was active as a freelancer in Berlin. From 1950 to 1962, he was professor of sculpture at the Kölner Werkschulen (Cologne Academy of Fine and Applied Arts) and from 1953, an Honorary Member of the Academy of Fine Arts, Munich.

Between 1959 and 1962, Gies designed the windows of the choir of Essen Minster and received the Große Kunstpreis des Landes Nordrhein-Westfalen ("Great Art Prize of North Rhine-Westphalia"). In 1957, Gies, a professing Catholic, received from the hands of the Federal President Theodor Heuss the Grand Cross of Merit of the Federal Republic of Germany. Ludwig Gies died in Cologne and was buried in the Melaten Cemetery. The Letter Foundation awards a scholarship for sculptors and modellers which bears the name "Ludwig Gies-Preis für Kleinplastik" ("Ludwig Gies Award for Small Sculpture").

== Works ==
Ludwig Gies's works are characterized by low or sunk reliefs, often fantastically or unusually cut, and a style partly Cubist and partly late Expressionist. He is also known for small sculptures of clay and for bronze medals. His design work for West German churches included altar rails, candlesticks, mosaics, and stained-glass windows.

Gies became known mainly for two sculptures:

One was the crucifix in Lübeck Cathedral (1922), a larger than life-size woodcarving "strongly reminiscent of medieval devotional figures in distorted anguish", which was held up as a typical work of degenerate art; its head having been chopped off and plunged in the Trave river.

The other is a vast mural relief of the Federal Eagle (1953, also known as the "Gies Eagle") – popularly known as "the Fat Hen" due to its slightly bouffant, almost circular overall outline. (The nickname itself was really derived from the German proper name of some variations of Sedum, called "Fetthenne[n]" or "Fette Henne[n]" in German, popular not only in German gardens and characterised by the fleshy, i.e. "fat", appearance of their leaves). It was to be seen in all the chambers used by the Bundestag and in modified form is still to be found hung at the front of the Plenary Hall of the Reichstag in Berlin.

Gies is considered the founder of the Rhenish School of Medal Work. His last pupil was Wolfgang Reuter, whom he taught from 1961. His successor in his teaching was Hanskarl Burgeff, whose students Agatha Kill, Lucia Hardegen and Hanspeter Dünwald are active in the third generation of the school.

== Notes and references ==
=== Bibliography ===
- Ernsting, Bernd: Ludwig Gies. Meister des Kleinreliefs. Letter-Stiftung, Köln 1995, ISBN 3-930633-02-7
- Ernsting, Bernd, Wedewer, Rolf Wedewer (eds.): Ludwig Gies. Werke im Museum Morsbroich. Museum Morsbroich, Leverkusen 1989, ISBN 3-925520-22-8
- Ernsting, Bernd (ed.): Ludwig Gies 1887–1966. Leverkusen, Selbstverlag 1990, ISBN 3-925520-23-6
- Feldkirchen, Toni: Ludwig Gies. Bongers, Recklinghausen 1960
- Fischer-Defoy, Christine: Kunst Macht Politik. Die Nazifizierung der Kunst- und Musikhochschulen in Berlin, pp. 287ff. Elefanten Press, Berlin 1988, ISBN 3-88520-271-9
- Hoff, August: Plaketten und Medaillen von Ludwig Gies. Scherpe, Krefeld 1962
- Howoldt, Jenns Eric: Der Kruzifixus von Ludwig Gies in Der Wagen 1988, pp. 164–174. ISBN 3-87302-048-3
- Steguweit, Wolfgang: Hilde Broër. Bildhauerin und Medailleurin – Leben und Werk, pp. 15ff. Gebr. Mann, Berlin 2004, ISBN 3-7861-2490-6
