= Nordfriedhof (Munich) =

Cemetery in Munich, Germany

Coordinates: 48.175°N 11.602778°E

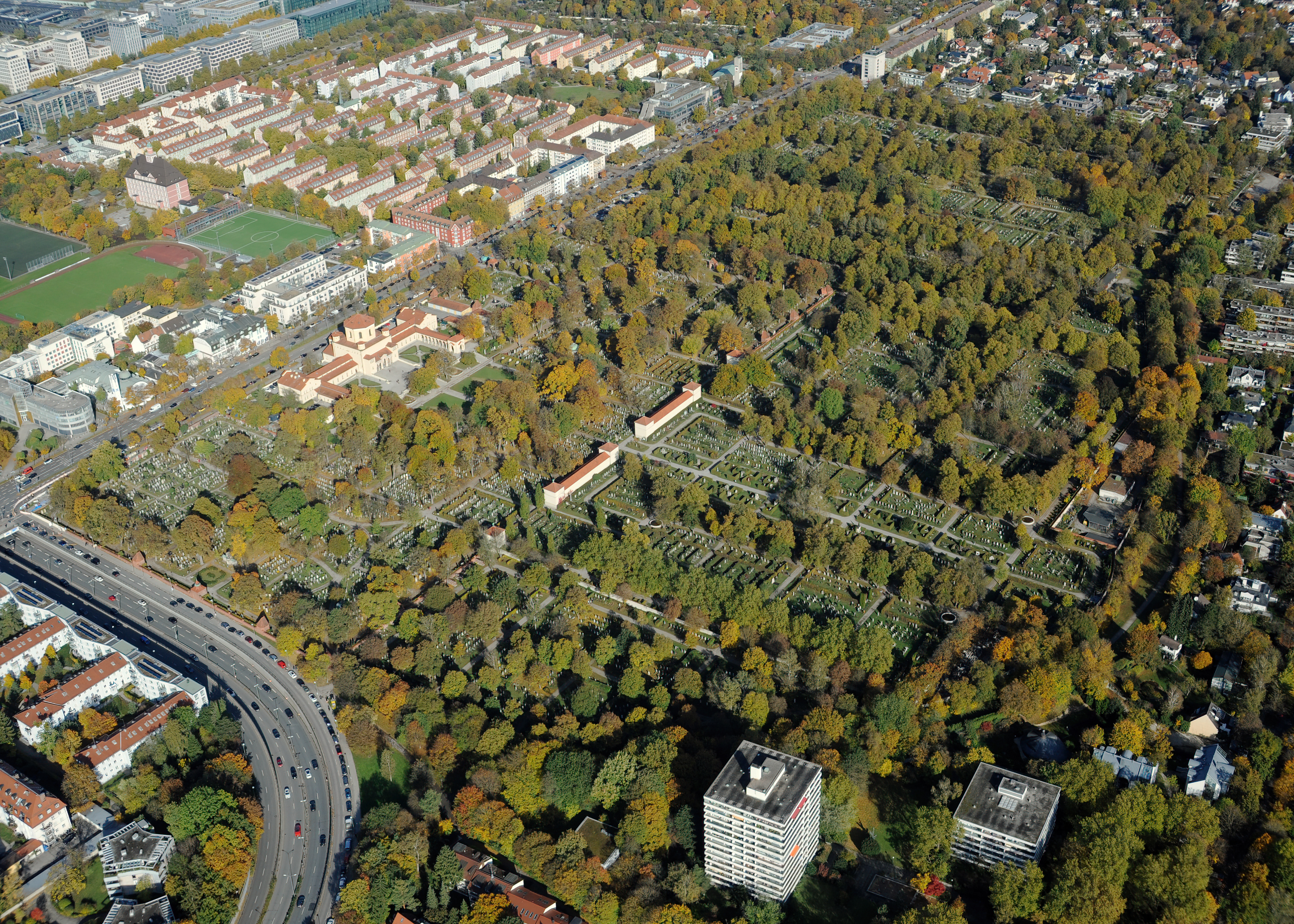
Aerial view of the Nordfriedhof from the south

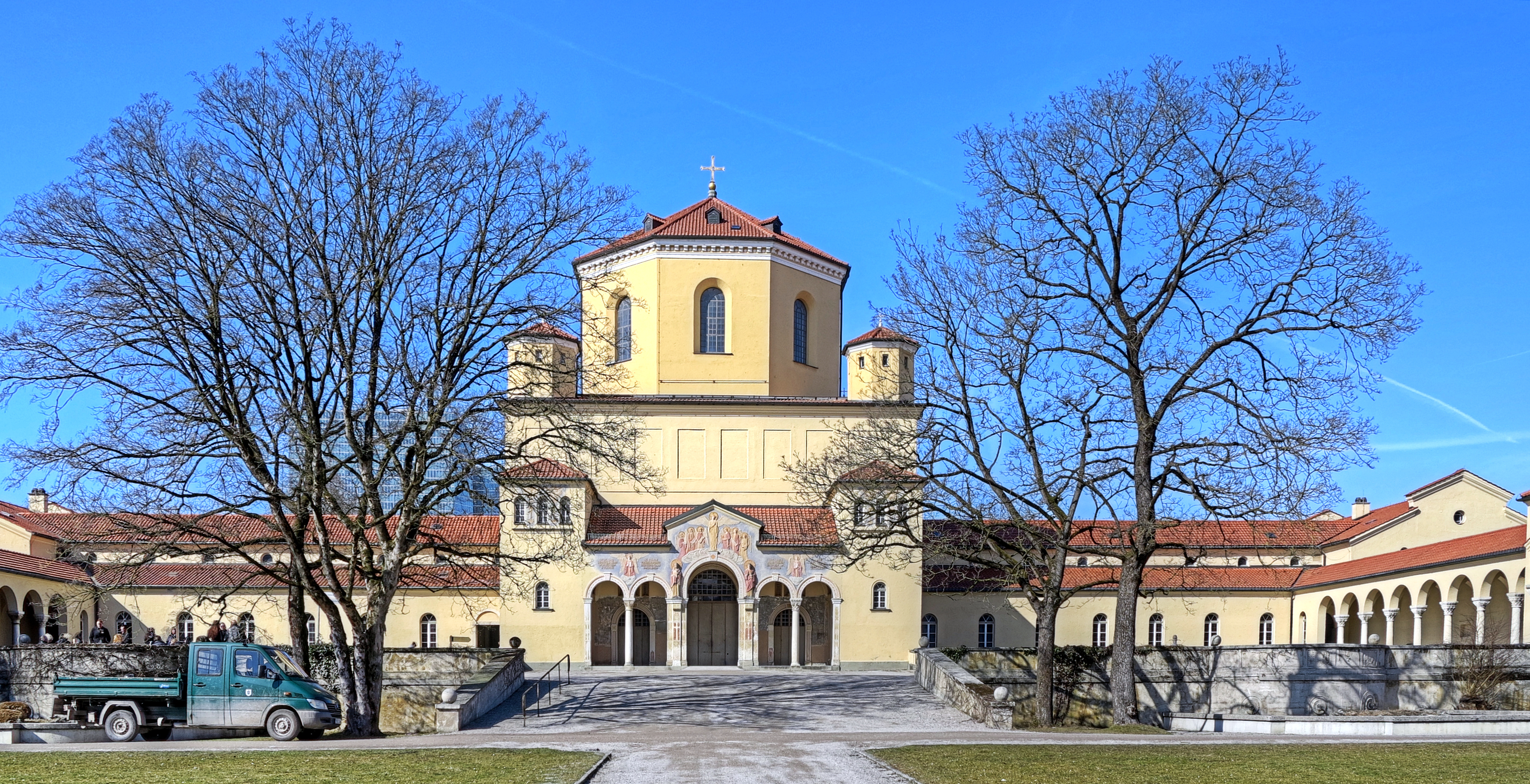
Chapel (centre), mortuary (left)

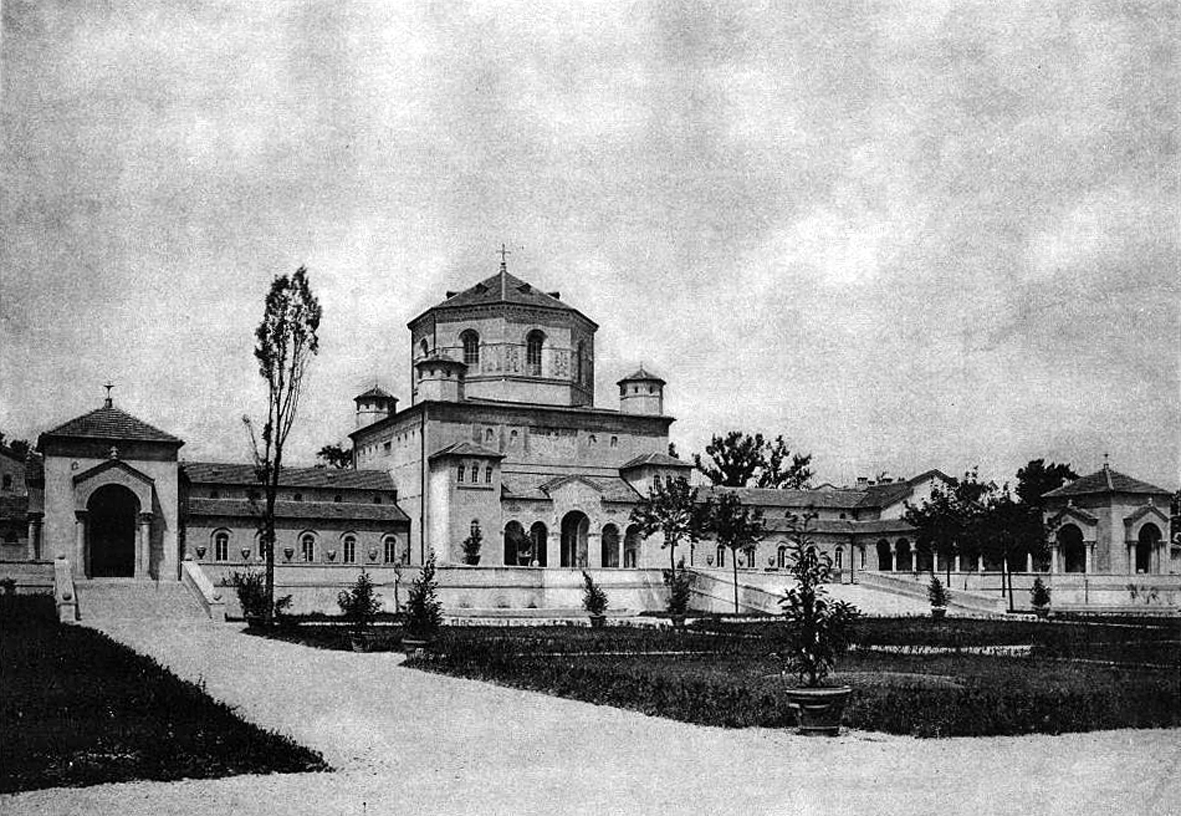
View of the cemetery buildings looking towards the burial ground, 1901 (from G A Horst, Die neuen Friedhof-Anlagen Münchens)

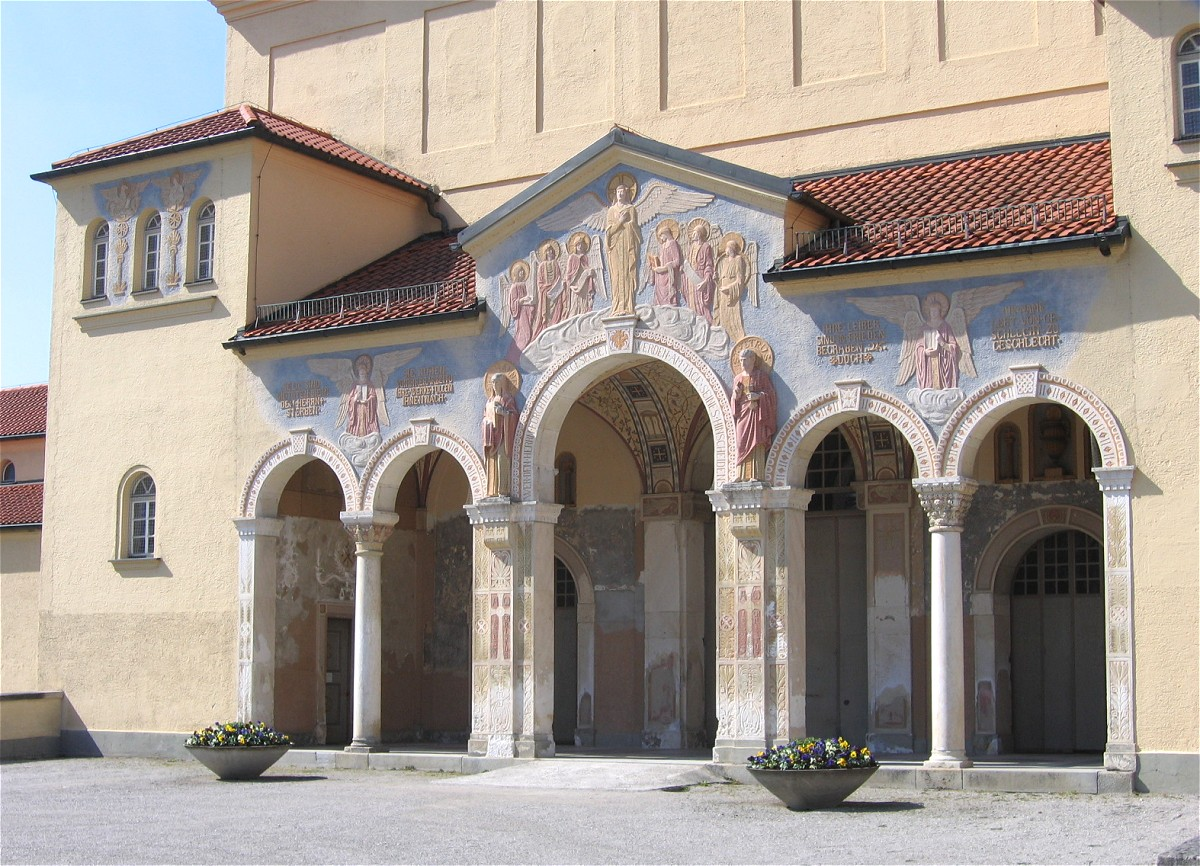

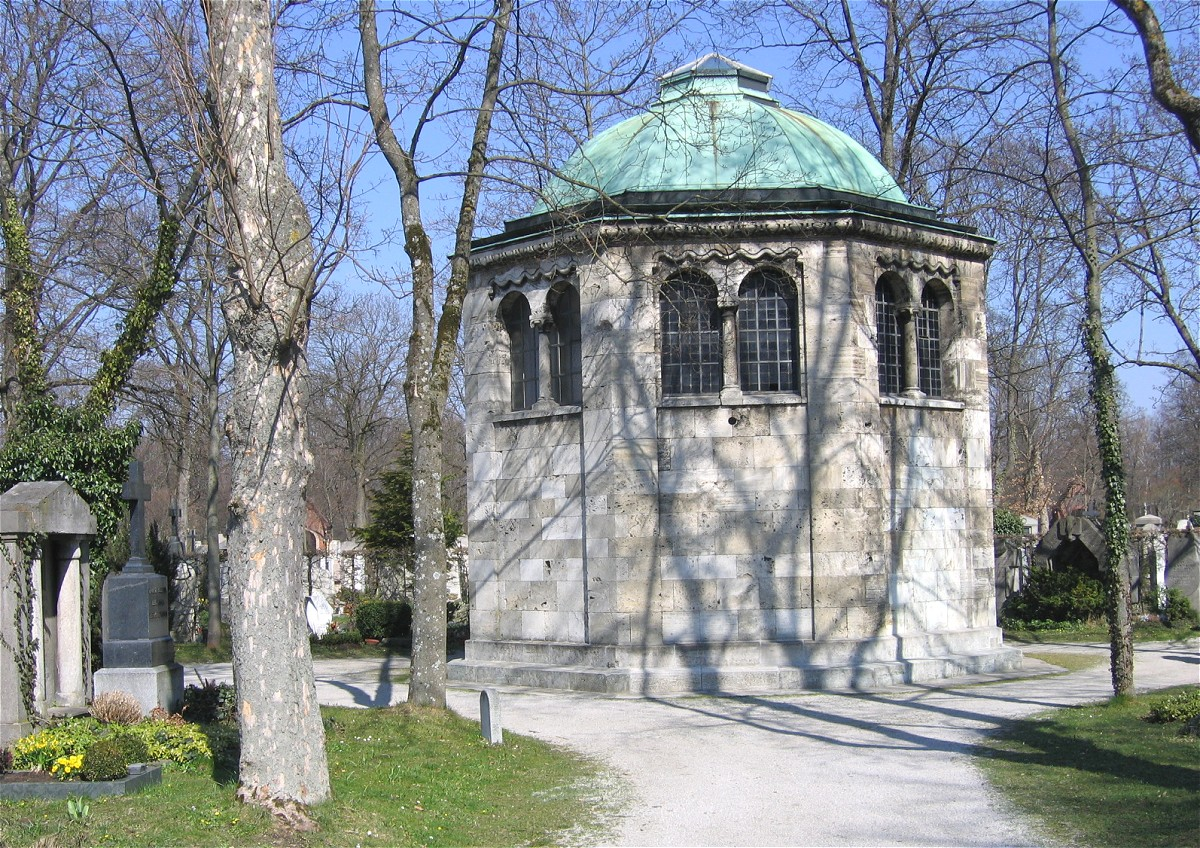

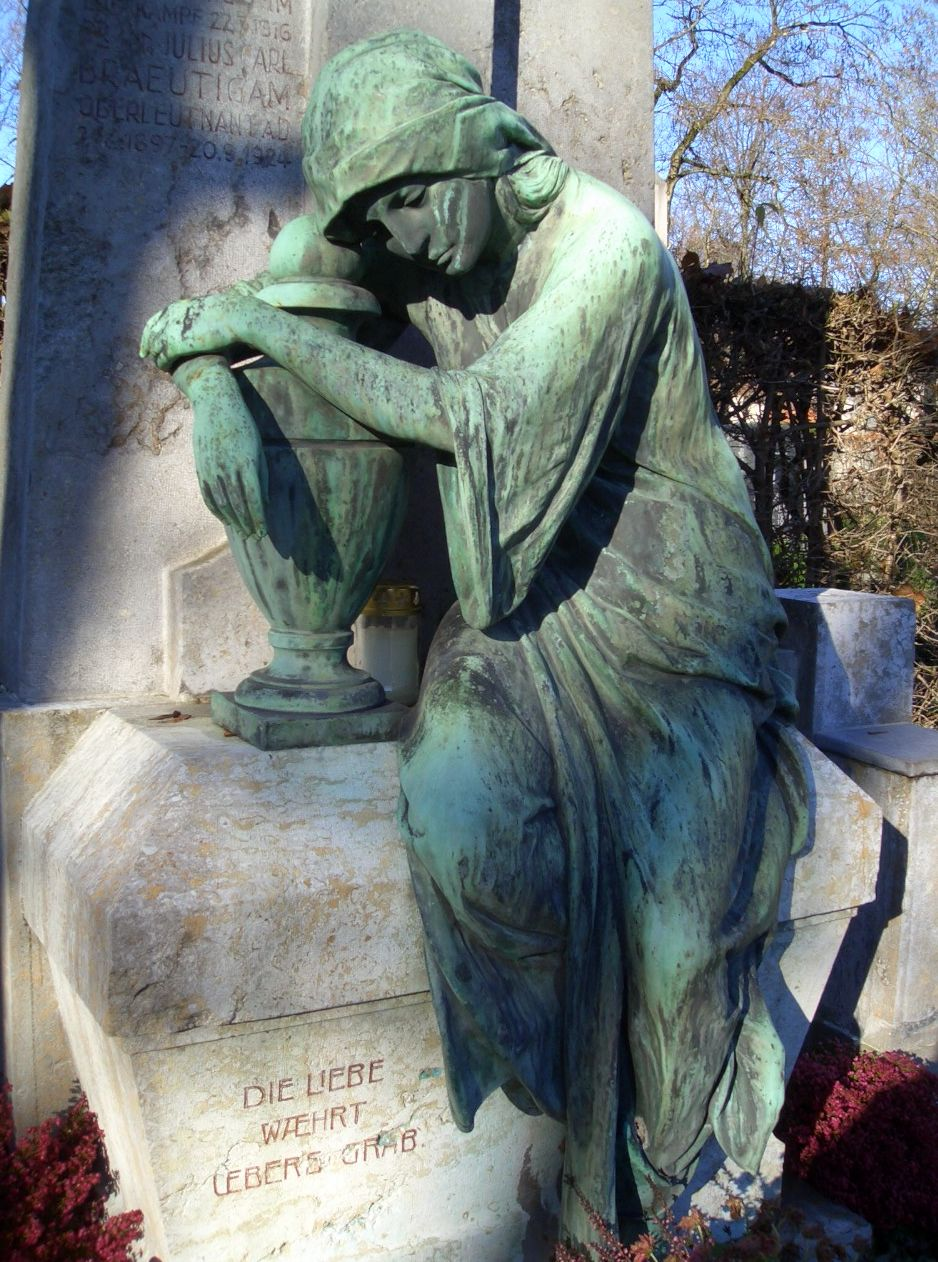
Mourner on the monument of Julius Braeutigam (d. 1905) (electrotype by Fidel Binz, WMF, Geislingen

The Nordfriedhof ("Northern Cemetery"), with 34,000 burial plots, is one of the largest cemeteries in Munich, Bavaria, Germany. It is situated in the suburb of Schwabing-Freimann. It was established by the former community of Schwabing in 1884. It is not to be confused with the Alter Nordfriedhof in Munich, which was set up only a short time previously within the then territory of the city of Munich.

A station on the Munich U-Bahn is also called Nordfriedhof after the cemetery, and the surrounding area is also known locally as "Nordfriedhof" from the station.

The imposing cemetery buildings include a chapel, a mortuary and a burial wall, which was designed between 1896 and 1899 by the municipal architect Hans Grässel. In 1962 a columbarium was added to the north by the architect Eugen Jacoby.

The chapel is described, slightly altered, in Thomas Mann's novella Death in Venice, when the sight of it precipitates a foreboding of death in the protagonist.

== Selected burials ==
- Peter Paul Althaus, poet of Schwabing
- Herb Andress, actor
- Annette von Aretin, first female announcer of Bayerischer Rundfunk
- August Arnold, film producer and director
- Karl Arnold, caricaturist in the journal Simplicissimus
- Philip Arp, actor, cabaret performer, author and theatre director
- Halton Arp, astronomer
- Gert Bastian, brigadier-general, symbolic figure of the peace movement
- Fritz Benscher, actor and quiz master
- Otto Bezold, politician
- Franziska Bilek, caricaturist and artist
- Louis Braun, professor and historical painter
- Beppo Brem, folk actor
- Georg Britting, writer
- Christine Buchegger, actress
- Franz von Defregger, artist
- Hans Dölle, legal academic
- Sammy Drechsel, sports reporter and cabaret performer, and his wife Irene Koss, actress and the first television announcer in Germany
- Constanze Engelbrecht, actress
- Oskar Eversbusch, professor of ophthalmology
- Theodore Feucht, painter
- Josef Flossmann, sculptor
- Leonhard Frank, writer
- Hermann Frieb, resistance fighter against the Nazi regime
- Marie Amelie von Godin, writer, supporter of women's rights and Albanologist
- Günter Freiherr von Gravenreuth, lawyer
- Klaus Havenstein, cabaret performer and actor
- Johannes Heesters, actor and singer
- Trude Hesterberg (Schönherr), cabaret performer
- Heinrich Hoffmann, Hitler's official photographer, with his daughter Henriette von Schirach
- Kurt Horwitz, actor, director at the Munich Kammerspiele, director of the Bayerisches Staatsschauspiel
- Peter Igelhoff, musician, composer of pop music and jazz
- Günther Kaufmann, actor
- Eduard von Keyserling, writer (grave 25–4–1)
- Kathi Kobus, landlady of the Alter Simpl
- Wolfgang Koeppen, writer
- Oskar Körner, killed during the Munich Putsch, Second Chairman of the NSDAP
- Otto Kurth, actor and director
- Inge Latz, composer and musical healer
- Hermann Lenz, writer
- Ernst Mach, physicist and philosopher
- Ferdinand Marian, actor (grave now removed)
- Georg Marischka, actor and director
- Anton Neuhäusler, Bavarian dialect poet
- Peter Pasetti, actor
- Ludwig Petuel senior and junior, industrialists
- Toni Pfülf, SPD politician
- Bally Prell, performance artist
- Sebastian Osterrieder, sculptor, Krippenwastl
- Theodor von der Pfordten, killed during the Munich Putsch (in family grave)
- Hans Pössenbacher, actor
- Mady Rahl, actress (grave 178-U-66)
- Anton Riemerschmid, founder of the first German business school for girls
- Barbara Rudnik, actress
- Wilhelm von Rümann, sculptor, formerly in the Alten Vereins-Urnenhalle (urn now secured)
- Beatrix, Countess of Schönburg-Glauchau, socialite
- Arnulf Schröder, actor
- Carl-Heinz Schroth, actor
- Oswald Spengler, political philosopher
- Heinz-Günter Stamm, actor, radio and theatre director
- Fedor Stepun, philosopher and sociologist
- Karlheinz Summerer, Roman Catholic chaplain for the Munich Olympics, 1972
- Siegbert Tarrasch, chess player, theoretician and writer
- Paul Troost, architect
- Kurt Weinzierl, actor, cabaret performer and director
- Frederic Vester, biochemist, environmental expert and writer
- Albert Weisgerber, painter
- Annemarie Wendl, actress
- Otto Wernicke, actor (grave now removed)
- Josef Wittmann, church painter
- Karoline Wittmann, painter
- Paul Wittmann, sculptor
- Eduard Zimmermann, journalist and television presenter
- Traudl Junge, secretary to Adolf Hitler, 1942–1945
- Arnold Sommerfeld, theoretical physicist
- A mass grave for 2,099 victims of aerial bombardment during World War II has been converted to form a "grove of honour for air raid victims" (Ehrenhain für Luftkriegsopfer), with a monument by Hans Wimmer.

== Sources ==
- Gretzschel, M., 1996: Historische Friedhöfe in Deutschland, Österreich und der Schweiz. Das Reiselexikon. Munich: Callwey ISBN 3-7667-1233-0
- Scheibmayr, E., 1985: Letzte Heimat. Persönlichkeiten in Münchner Friedhöfen 1784–1984 (1st edition). Munich: Edition Scheibmayr
  Continued by:
  Wer? Wann? Wo? Persönlichkeiten in Münchner Friedhöfen. (Teil 1/3, Ergänzung zum Grundwerk und Fortschreibung bis 1989). Munich: Edition Scheibmayr 1989 ISBN 3-9802211-1-3
  Wer? Wann? Wo? Persönlichkeiten in Münchner Friedhöfen. (Teil 2/3, Ergänzung zum Grundwerk und Fortschreibung bis 1996). Munich: Edition Scheibmayr 1997 ISBN 3-9802211-3-X
  Wer? Wann? Wo? Persönlichkeiten in Münchner Friedhöfen. (Teil 3/3, Ergänzung zum Grundwerk und Fortschreibung bis 2002). Munich: Edition Scheibmayr 2002 ISBN 3-9802211-4-8
