= Vierthaler =

Vierthaler is a surname. Notable people with the surname include:

- Franz Michael Vierthaler (1758–1827), Austrian pedagogue
- Johann Vierthaler (1869–1957), German sculptor
