= August Drumm =

German sculptor

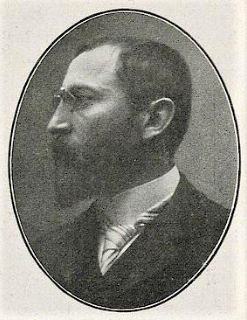
August Drumm (date unknown)

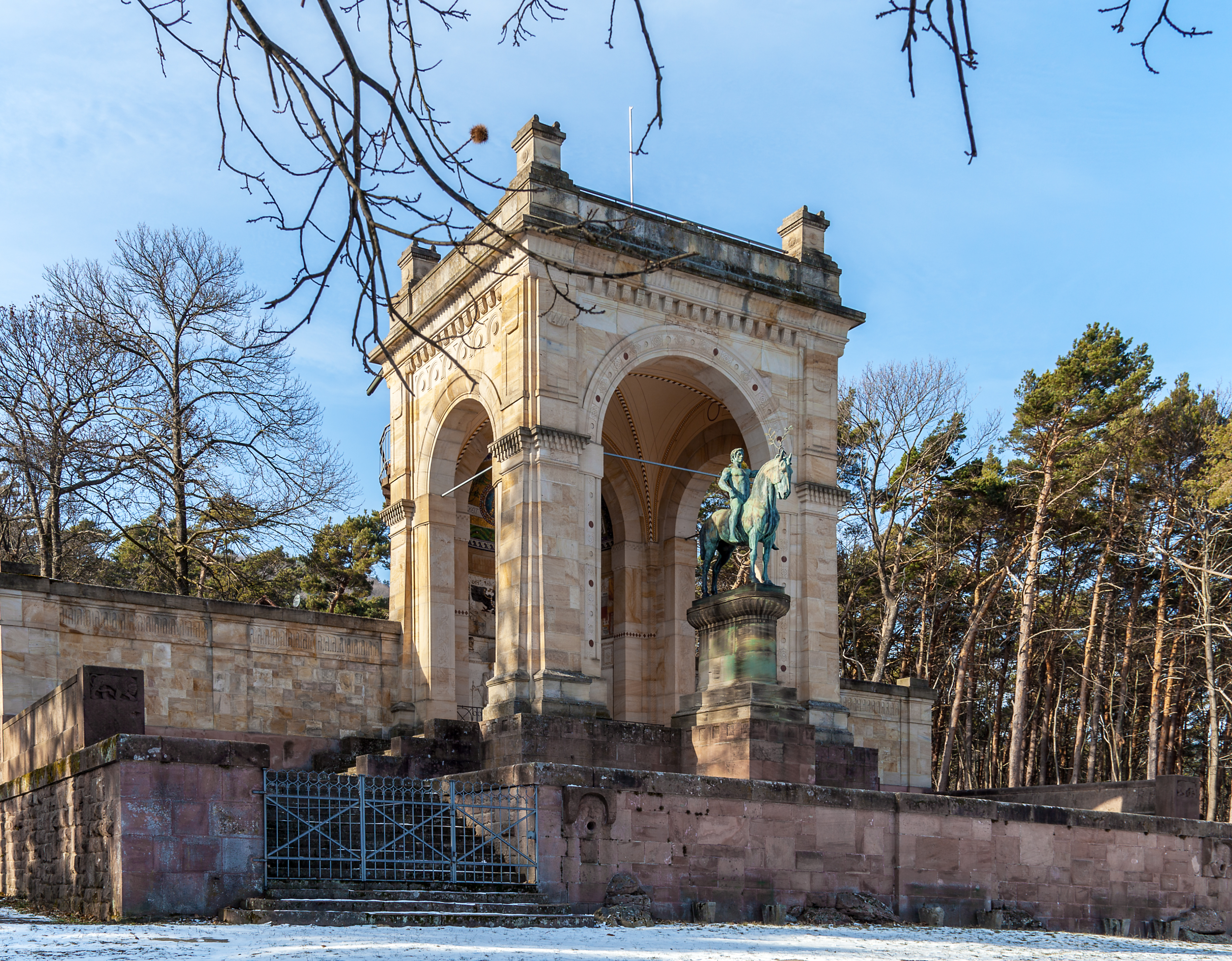
The Victory and Peace Monument in Edenkorben

August Drumm (26 May 1862, Ulmet – 21 October 1904, Munich) was a German sculptor.

== Life and work ==
He was the eighth of nine children born to Abraham and Maria Drumm, who were millers. Five of his siblings died in childhood. At first, he was more devoted to manual work than to his lessons at school in Kaiserslautern.

In 1881, after failing at several schools in Kusel and Kaiserslautern, and at a commercial apprenticeship, he prevailed against his father's wishes and was able to enroll at the Kunstgewerbeschule in Munich. There he studied with the sculptor, Anton Hess.

This became his chosen profession. Two years later, he took classes at the Academy of Fine Arts with the monumental sculptor, Syrius Eberle. This was where he met his lifelong friend and associate, Emil Dittler, and gained the support of Luitpold, Prince Regent of Bavaria. This enabled him to study in Florence and Rome from 1887 to 1890, and would later lead to his appointment as a professor.

In 1899, he created what is considered to be his magnum opus; the Victory and Peace Monument in Edenkoben. During its two-year construction period, he met Amalie Lorenz, whom he would marry in 1902. She was ten years his junior. Several other major projects followed. The Wittelsbach fountain in Zweibrücken (1903) was his last.

He was interred at the Friedhof Solln. The now-abandoned tomb included a bronze head of Christ, created by Drumm himself. Claims that some of the sculptures in Neuschwanstein Castle are his appear to be incorrect.

== Sources ==
- Albert Zink: "August Drumm, ein pfälzischer Bildhauer", In: Heimatblatt des Remigiuslandes, Vol.8, Nr. 11, November 1929.
- Hans von Malottki: "Vom Mühlbach in die Kunstmetropole. – August Drumm, der Schöpfer bedeutender Denkmäler, starb vor 95 Jahren in München", In: Die Stimme der Pfalz, Munich, December 1999.
- Erik Sayer: "Der Dunkelheit entrissen. Ausstellung zu Ehren August Drumms", In: Westricher Rundschau. 18 June 2004.
- Gernot Spengler, "August Drumm. Würdigung des Künstlers, der vor 100 Jahren starb", In: Westrichkalender 2005, Landkreis Kusel, Görres-Verlag, Koblenz,ISSN 0724-0473, pp.135-140
- Claudia Gilcher: "Ein Ort, ein Mensch: August Drumm, der vergessene Bildhauer", In: Westricher Rundschau., 14 February 2009
