= German Society for Christian Art =

Coordinates: 48.14661°N 11.57374°E

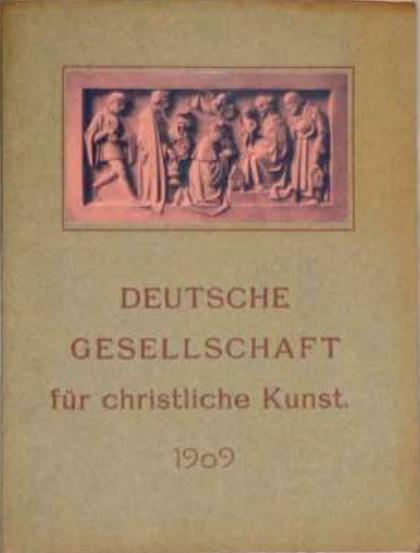
The Society's 1909 yearbook

The German Society for Christian Art (German: Deutsche Gesellschaft für christliche Kunst, or DG) is a "supra-regional, not-for-profit and independent cultural institution" based in Munich.

== History ==
In 1885, the sculptor Georg Busch founded the "Albrecht Dürer Verein", an association of religious artists who considered the Nazarenes to be their inspiration. In 1892, he joined with numerous other sculptors, painters, church historians and art publishers to create a society for the promotion of Christian art. As a result, the DG was formed in 1893, with Georg von Hertling as its first President. The group saw itself as an "ecumenically oriented forum for a lively dialogue between artists, theologians, philosophers and art lovers".

In the debate between Modernism and Ultramontanism, the society generally sided with the latter. In addition to artists, many bishops and members of the nobility joined. By 1912, the organization had 6,000 members. The DG published annual folders with reproductions and reviews of the works of its members, held competitions and took part in exhibitions.

In 1900, Busch created his own "German Society for Christian Art", and published a magazine. This resulted in a rigorous debate about commercialism, which made the DG more closely aligned with the episcopate. Bishops were granted the right of censorship. As a result, many Reform supporters left the DG. By the end of 1913, 1,000 members had resigned.

After World War I, it gave more consideration to newer styles, such as Expressionism. The art historian Georg Lill was placed in charge. In 1924, a generational change on the governing board led to further modernization, which resulted in a traditionalist counter-movement. By 1930, the trend toward Neoclassicism had asserted itself. During the Nazi period, its newsletter ceased publication, and it received little public notice. Following World War II, the modernizing process resumed.

In its gallery at Finkenstraße 4 on Wittelsbacherplatz in Munich it holds thematic retrospectives of contemporary artists. Since 1979 it has awarded the Gebhard Fugel Art Prize.
