= Syrius Eberle =

German sculptor and art professor (1844–1903)

- Born: 9 December 1844
- Died: 12 April 1903 (aged 58)
- Education: Academy of Fine Arts, Munich
- Known for: Painting

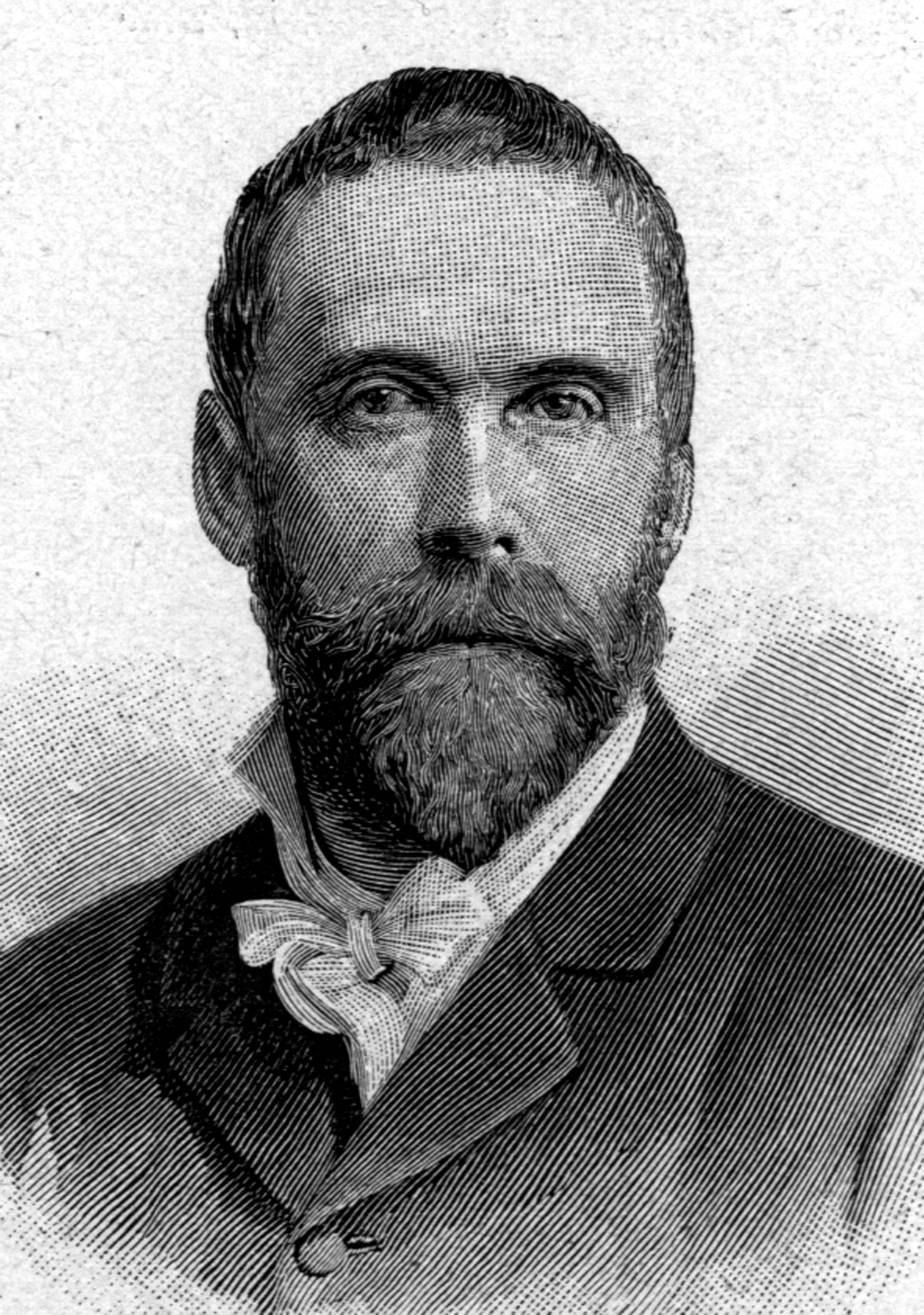
Syrius Eberle (before 1897)

Syrius Eberle (9 December 1844 – 12 April 1903) was a German sculptor and art professor.

== Biography ==
Eberle was born in Pfronten, Allgäu, the son of a carpenter. He married the daughter of the lithographer Thomas Driendl (1805–1859), also from Pfronten.

He first trained as a cabinet maker, and then studied from 1866 to 1872 at the Königliche Kunstakademie ("Royal Academy of Arts") in Munich. From 1884 he was himself a professor in the department of religious sculpture. Among his students were Georg Pezold, Heinrich Düll, Heinrich Waderé, Johann Vierthaler, Max Heilmaier, Georg Wrba, Georg Busch, Clemens Buscher, Josef Rauch, Bruno Diamant, Josef Flossmann, August Drumm, Emil Dittler and Ignatius Taschner.

Ludwig II, King of Bavaria, gave him several commissions for decorations for his newly built castles, and also for single figures, groups, panels, and almost all his carriages and sledges. He also created the former war memorial in Kempten, which in his time stood on the site of the present bus station. The bronze figures were melted down during World War II.

In 1889 his design in the competition for a national monument to the Brothers Grimm won only third prize. The organisers disagreed however about the design that won first prize, by the sculptor Max Wiese, whereupon they sought the opinion of Wilhelm Grimm's son, the art and literary historian Herman Grimm of Berlin. He decided on Eberle's design, and the commission for the monument was therefore given to him. On 18 October 1896 the formal unveiling of the monument took place.

During the years 1890-1892 he made the four pylons for the Ludwigsbrücke ("Ludwig Bridge") in Munich, as well as the 1890 monument in the Ottostrasse to Franz Xaver Gabelsberger, the inventor of stenography. As a professor at the Munich Kunstakademie he was a member in 1893 of the commission formed to evaluate the suggestions for the new building of the Bayerisches Nationalmuseum (built 1894/95). In addition, he was a member of the Munich Albrecht-Dürer-Verein, an association of students of the Academy of Arts founded in 1885 by his former student, Georg Busch. Here too he gave evening sessions on the composition of Christian themes.

In August 1897, he won the competition for the equestrian statue of Kaiser Wilhelm I in Nuremberg, but retired to Bozen in the South Tyrol, where he died in 1903, before its completion. The commission was taken over by Wilhelm von Rümann.

== Selected works ==
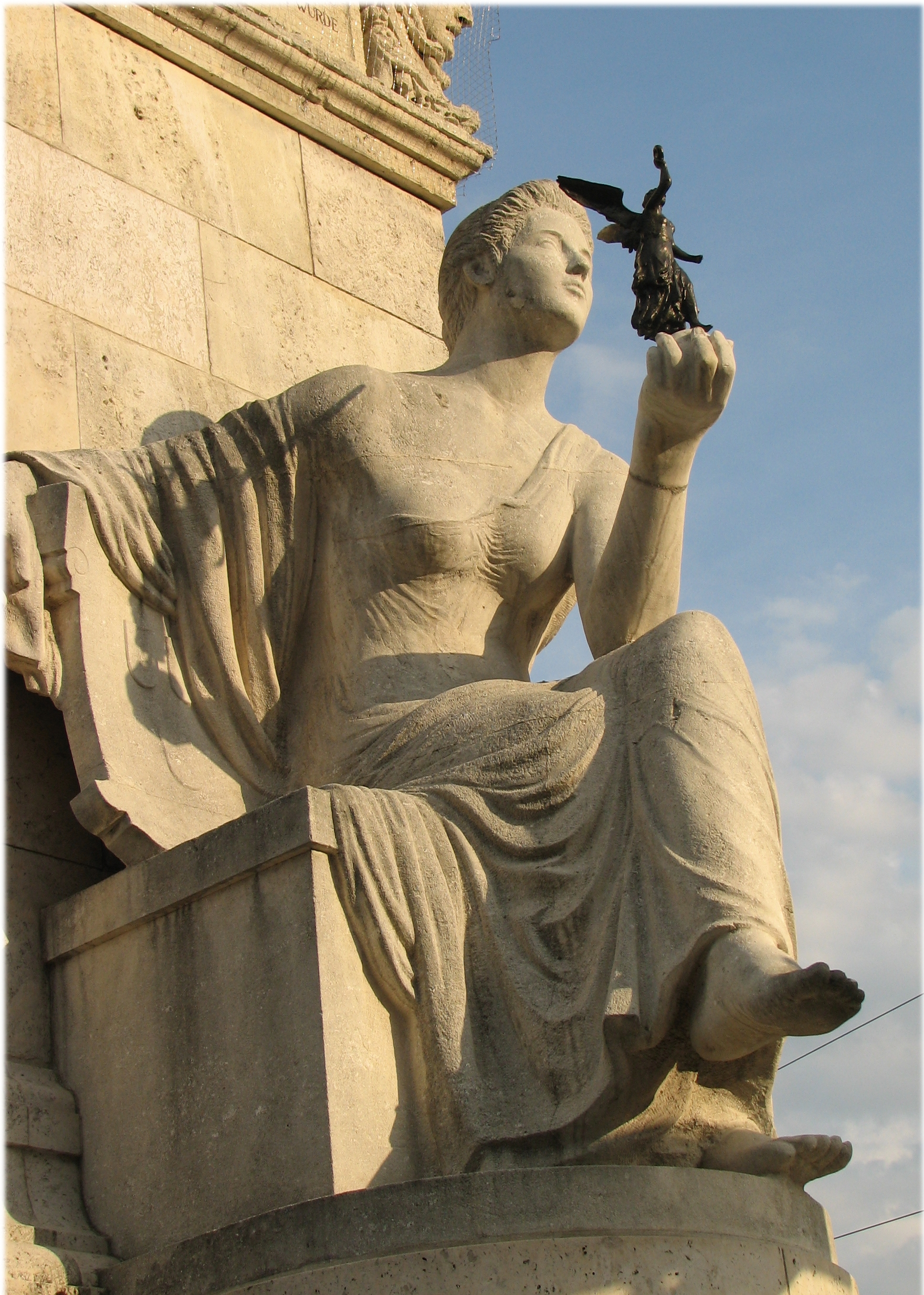
Detail from a pylon at the Ludwigsbrücke

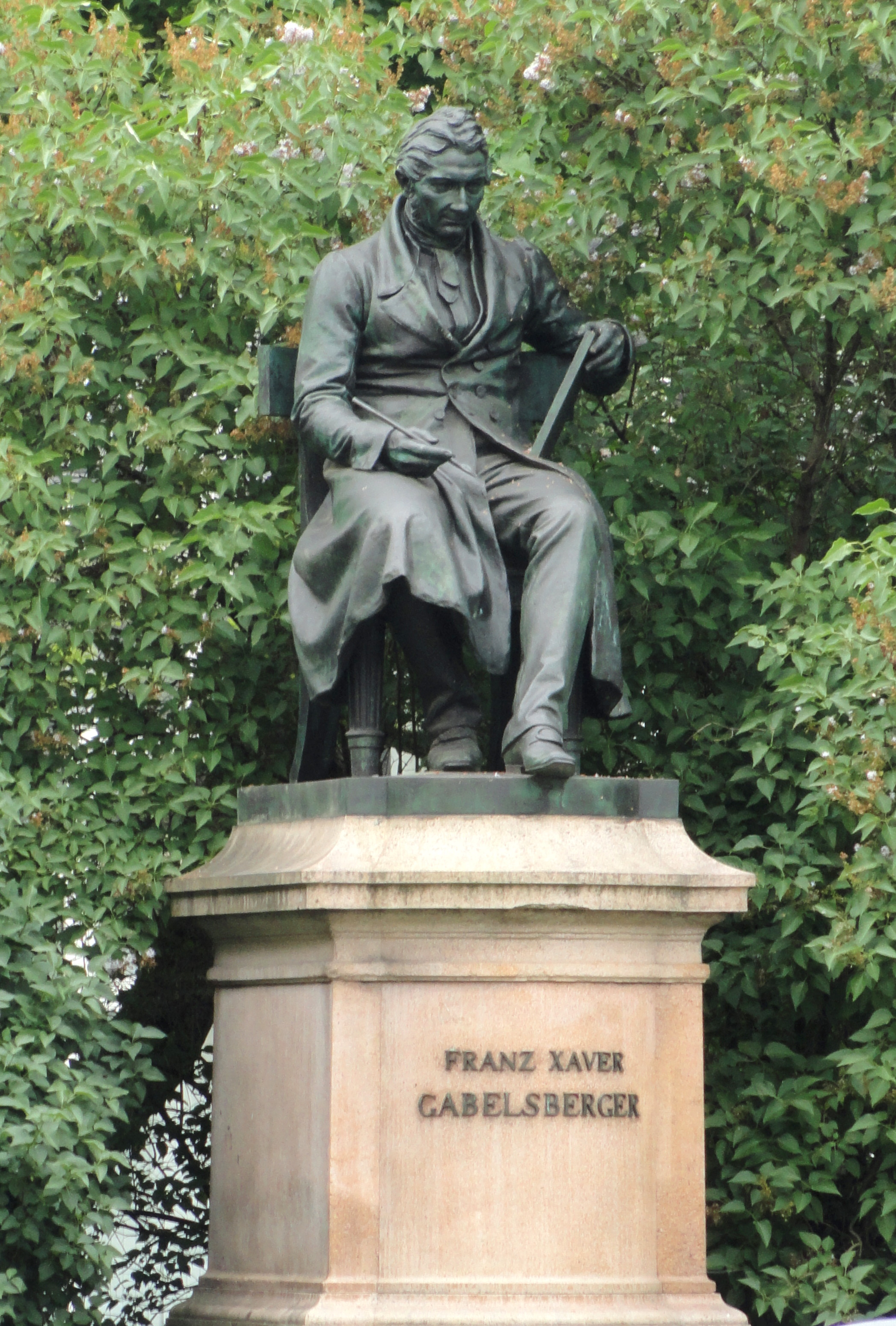
Monument to Franz Xaver Gabelsberger

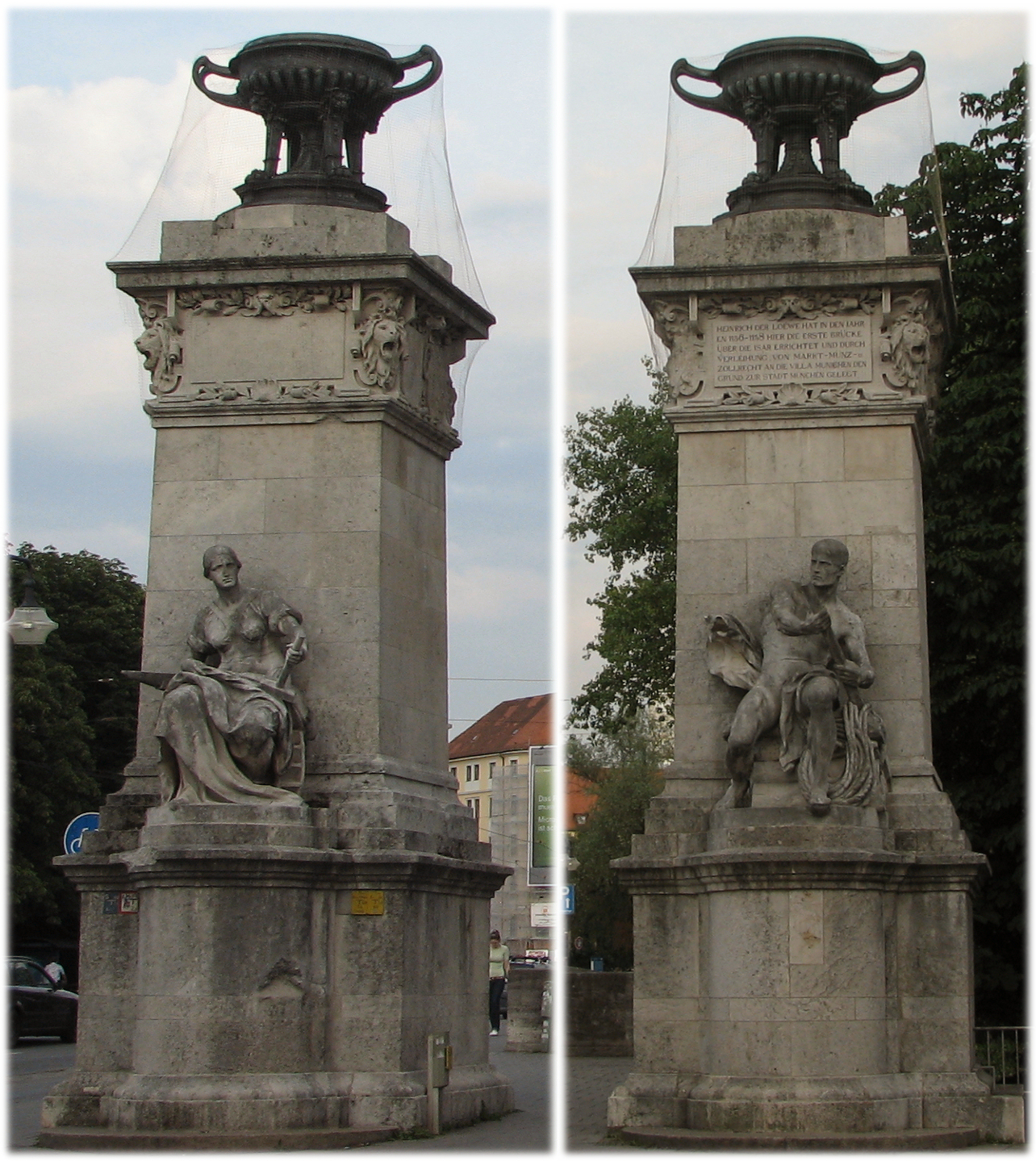
Two of Eberle's pylons for the Ludwigsbrücke, Munich

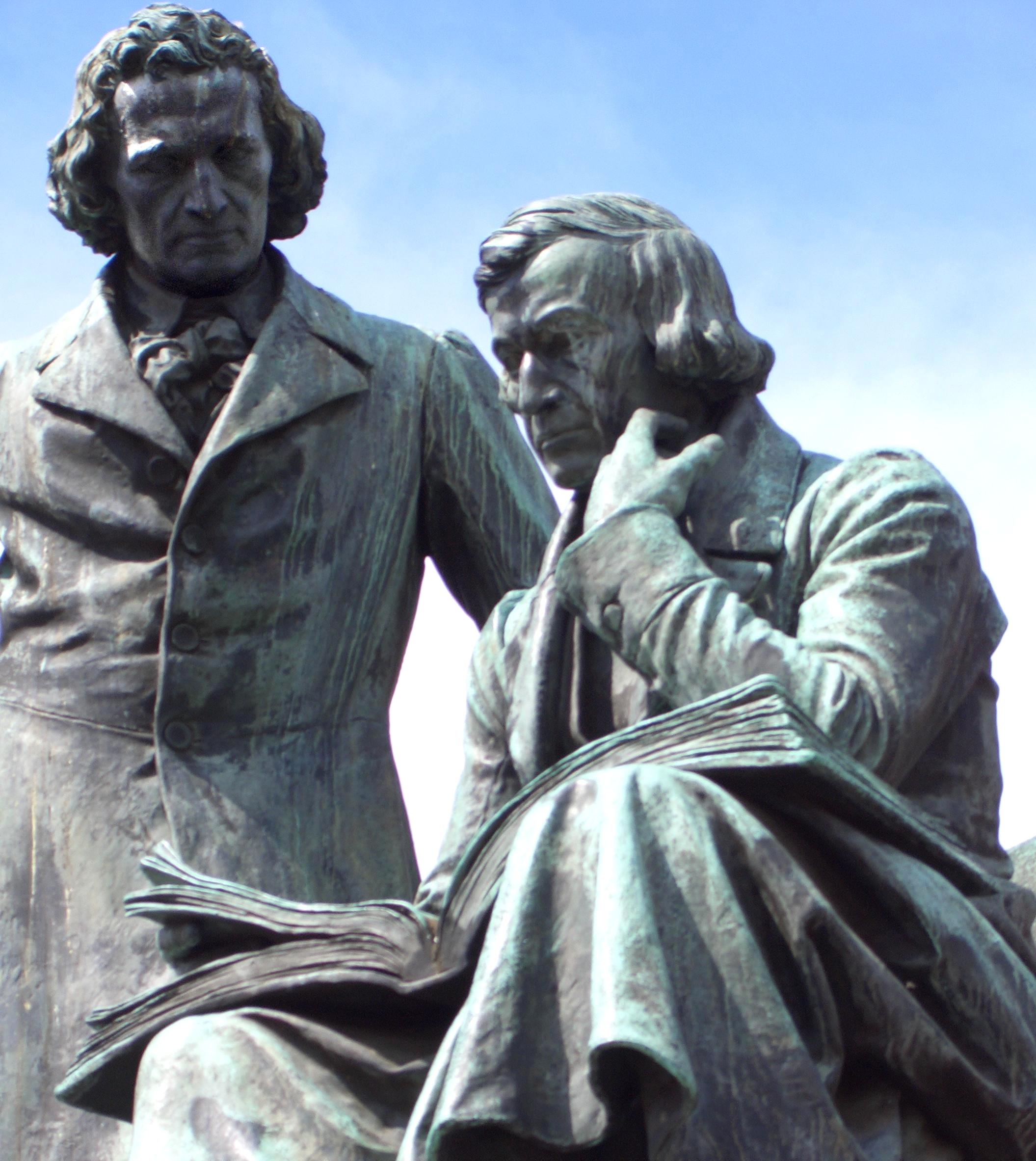
National Monument to the Brothers Grimm in Hanau

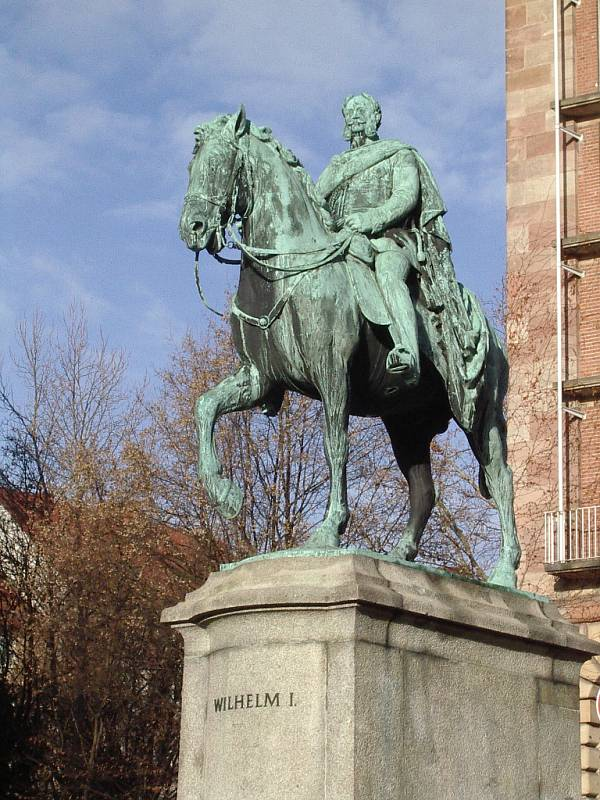
Equestrian statue to Kaiser Wilhelm I in Nuremberg

== Sources ==
- Syrius Eberle in: Ulrich Thieme, Felix Becker et al.: Allgemeines Lexikon der Bildenden Künstler von der Antike bis zur Gegenwart. Band 10, p. 301. E. A. Seemann, Leipzig 1914
- Allgemeines Künstlerlexikon (2002), vol. 31, p. 559
