= Josef Flossmann =

German sculptor

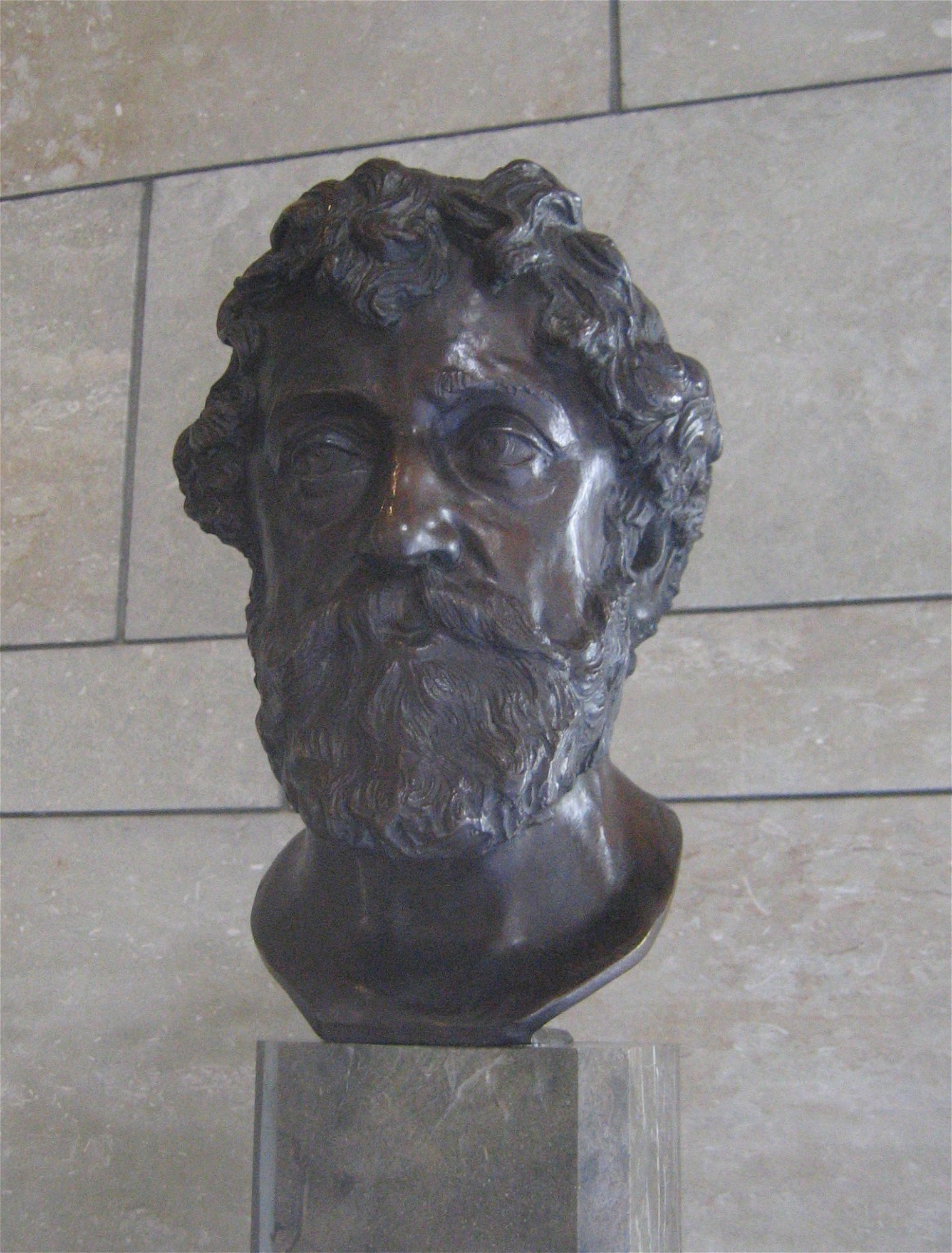
Josef Flossmann; bust by Adolf von Hildebrand

Josef Flossmann (19 March 1862, Munich, Kingdom of Bavaria – 20 October 1914, Munich) was a German sculptor; associated with the Munich Secession.

== Life and work ==
From 1881 to 1884, he studied at the Kunstgewerbeschule in Munich, with Anton Hess. Then, from 1884 to 1889, he was enrolled at the Academy of Fine Arts, where his primary instructor was Syrius Eberle. He was heavily influenced by Das Problem der Form in der bildenden Kunst, a theoretical work by Adolf von Hildebrand. As an early member of the Münchner Kunstkreis (art circle), he promoted clarifies forms; emphasizing the connection between sculpture and architecture. Several of his projects were in collaboration with architects such as Theodor Fischer, Friedrich von Thiersch, Gabriel von Seidl, German Bestelmeyer, Paul Ludwig Troost, and Alfred Messel. In 1893, he was awarded a gold medal at the Große Berliner Kunstausstellung.

He was one of the founding members of the Munich Secession, and was a regular participant in their exhibitions, as well as serving on the jury panels. In 1897, he was elected to the "Sachverständigen-Kommission zur Pflege und Führung der Kunst durch den Staat" (Expert Commission for the Care and Management of Art by the State). In 1901, he was honored for his achievements with the title of Royal Professor. The following year, Frederick I, Grand Duke of Baden, named him a Knight in the Order of the Zähringer Lion.

In 1903, at the founding meeting of the Deutscher Künstlerbund in Weimar, he was elected as one of the members of the Governing Board. He was a professor of sculpture at his alma mater, the Kunstgewerbeschule, until his death. After 1906, he was an honorary member of the Dresden Academy of Fine Arts.

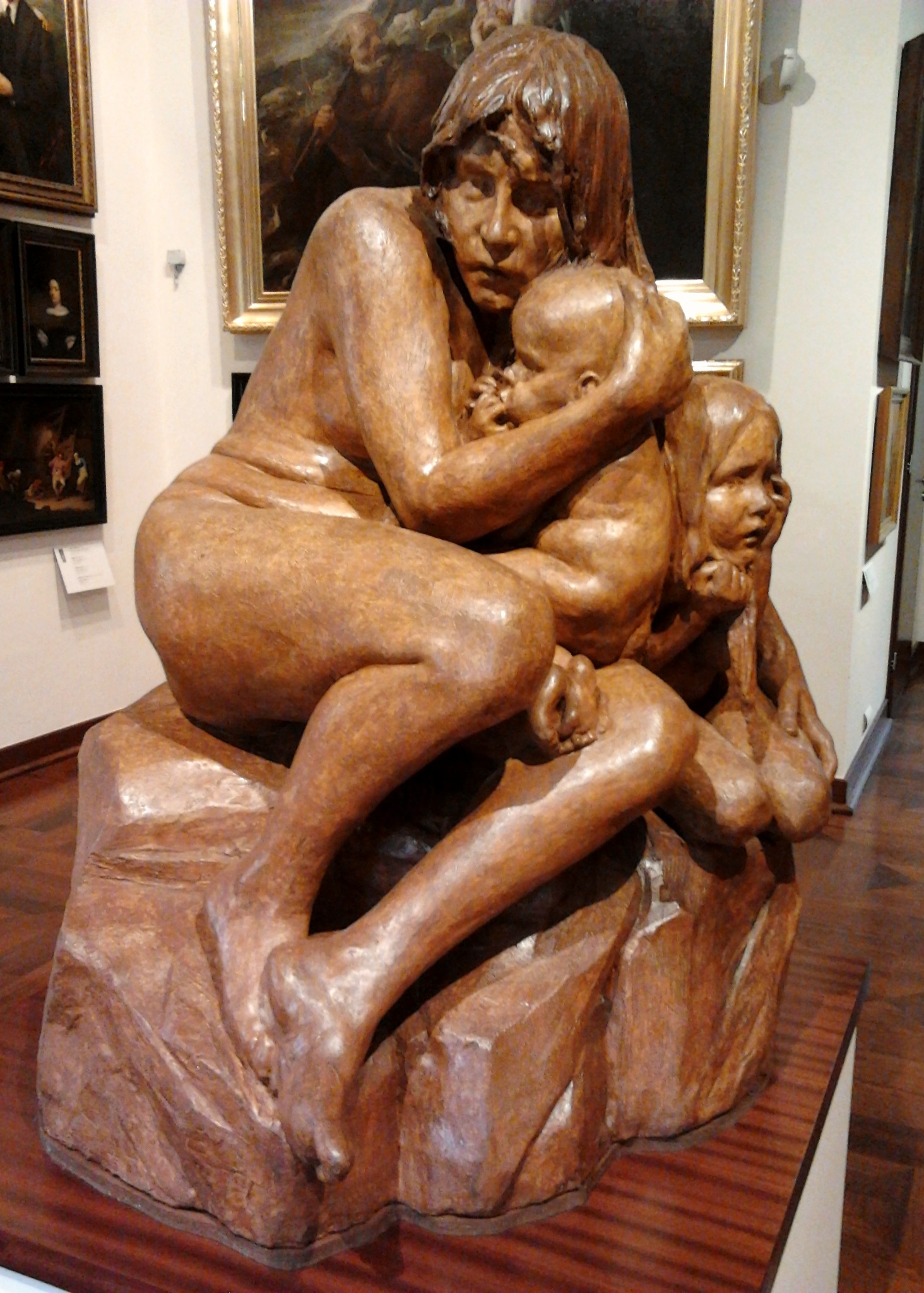
The Mother (c.1892), National Museum in Kraków

His Villa in Munich's Obermenzing served as his studio until 1909. After his death, it continued to be used as such by numerous visiting painters, sculptors and architects. In 1931, it became the residence of the painter, Edgar Ende. His son, the writer Michael Ende, has said that his time there served as inspiration for some of his fantasy stories.
