= Georg Busch =

German sculptor

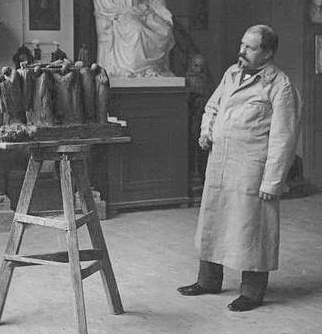
- Georg Busch in his studio, with a model of the "Burial of Christ" (1912)
- Born: March 11, 1862; Hanau, Germany
- Died: October 8, 1943 (aged 81); Munich, Nazi Germany
- Known for: Sculpture

Georg Busch (11 March 1862, Hanau – 8 October 1943, Munich) was a German sculptor. His works were primarily of a religious nature.

== Biography ==
His father, Johann Georg Busch (1823–1895) was a carpenter, wood sculptor and altar builder who established a church art workshop in 1863. It was there that he received his initial training. From 1880 to 1882, he was a student at the State Drawing Academy. He was given a scholarship, by the Grand Duchy of Hesse, that enabled him to study sculpture at the Academy of Fine Arts, Munich. His primary instructor there was Syrius Eberle.

In 1888, his eldest brother, Jacob, took over the family business, which enabled him to remain in Munich as a free-lance sculptor. He also became a member of the Association for Christian Art. Through his membership there, he worked to promote quality religious art. Much of it, in the late 19th-century, came from factory-like workshops, similar to his father's.

Over the years, he helped create and participated in a wide variety of related organizations: the German Society for Christian Art (1893), where he served two terms as president after 1924; the Society for Christian Art Exhibitions and sales (1900); and the Associated Exhibition House for Christian Art (1918). In 1897, he was awarded the Pro Ecclesia et Pontifice; in 1918, the King Ludwig Cross; and, in 1919 the Order of St. Sylvester.

With the help of his wife, Marie, he was also the proprietor of a publishing house; the "Allgemeine Vereinigung für christliche Kunst" (General Association for Christian Art), which was in operation from 1909 until his death. He focused on art history, and produced books for children, all reasonably priced. His firm issued around 100 titles altogether.

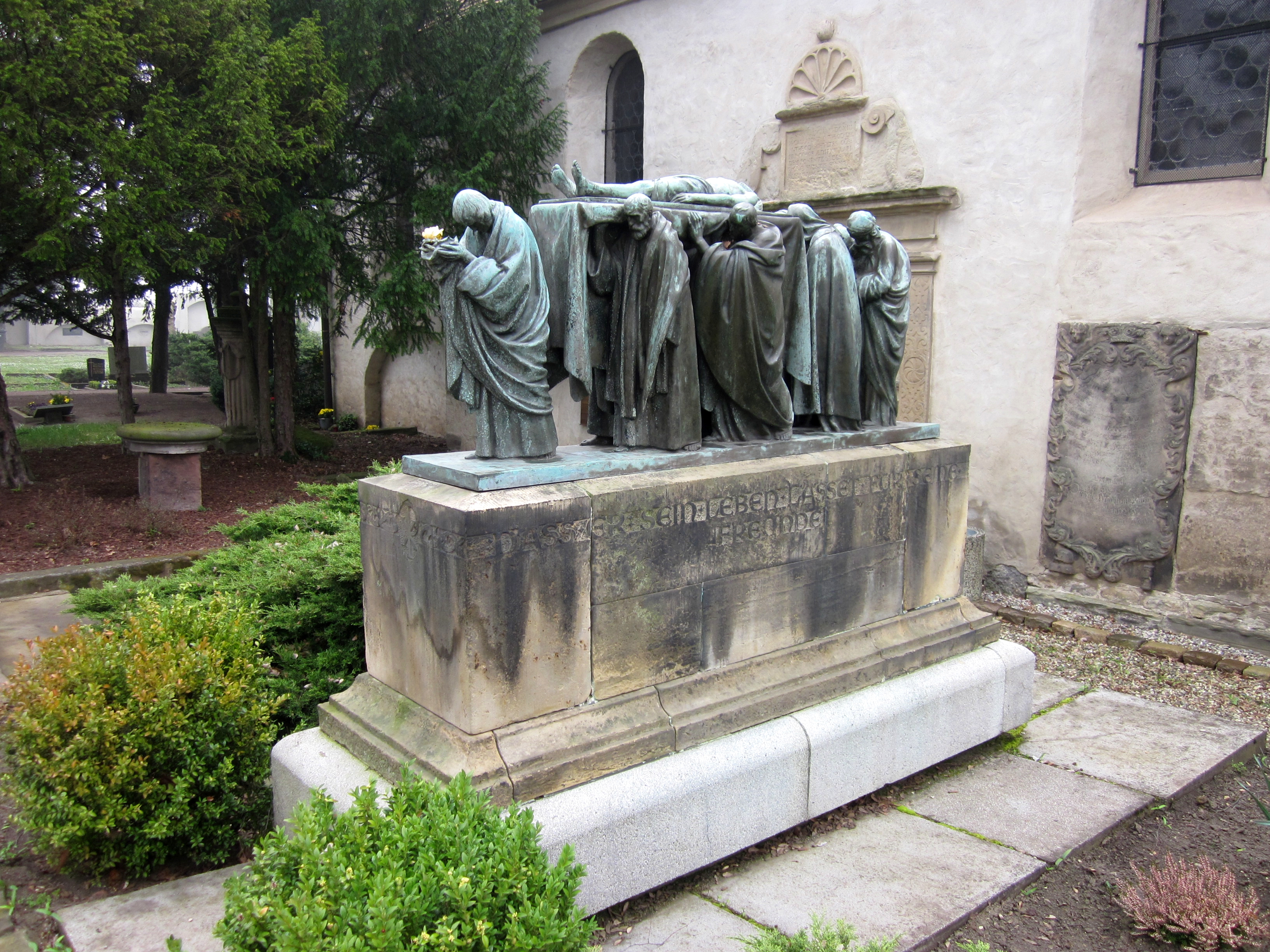
The Burial of Christ, Stadtfriedhof St. Maximi, Merseburg

A street in the Steinheim district of Hanau has been named after him. His son, Karl Busch, was an art historian.
