= Johann Vierthaler =

German sculptor

- Born: 5 July 1869; Munich, Germany
- Died: 17 November 1957 (aged 88); Holzhausen am Ammersee, Germany
- Occupation: Sculptor

Johann Vierthaler (5 July 1869 – 17 November 1957) was a German sculptor.

Following preliminary studies at the Königliche Kunstgewerbeschule in Munich, he studied at the Academy of Fine Arts from 1895 to 1900, under Syrius Eberle. He was a regular participant in exhibitions at the Glaspalast, and is best known for his small bronze figures in the Art Nouveau style.

His work was part of the sculpture event in the art competition at the 1936 Summer Olympics. He also participated in the Große Deutsche Kunstausstellung of 1942; a showcase for Nazi-approved art.

== Literature ==
- Dry-von Zezschwitz, Beate; Vierthaler, Johann (1997). Kleinplastiken aus dem Nachlaß des Künstlers (in German). München: Ketterer Kunst Verlag. ISBN 9783931638849.
