= Heinrich Waderé =

German sculptor and medal engraver

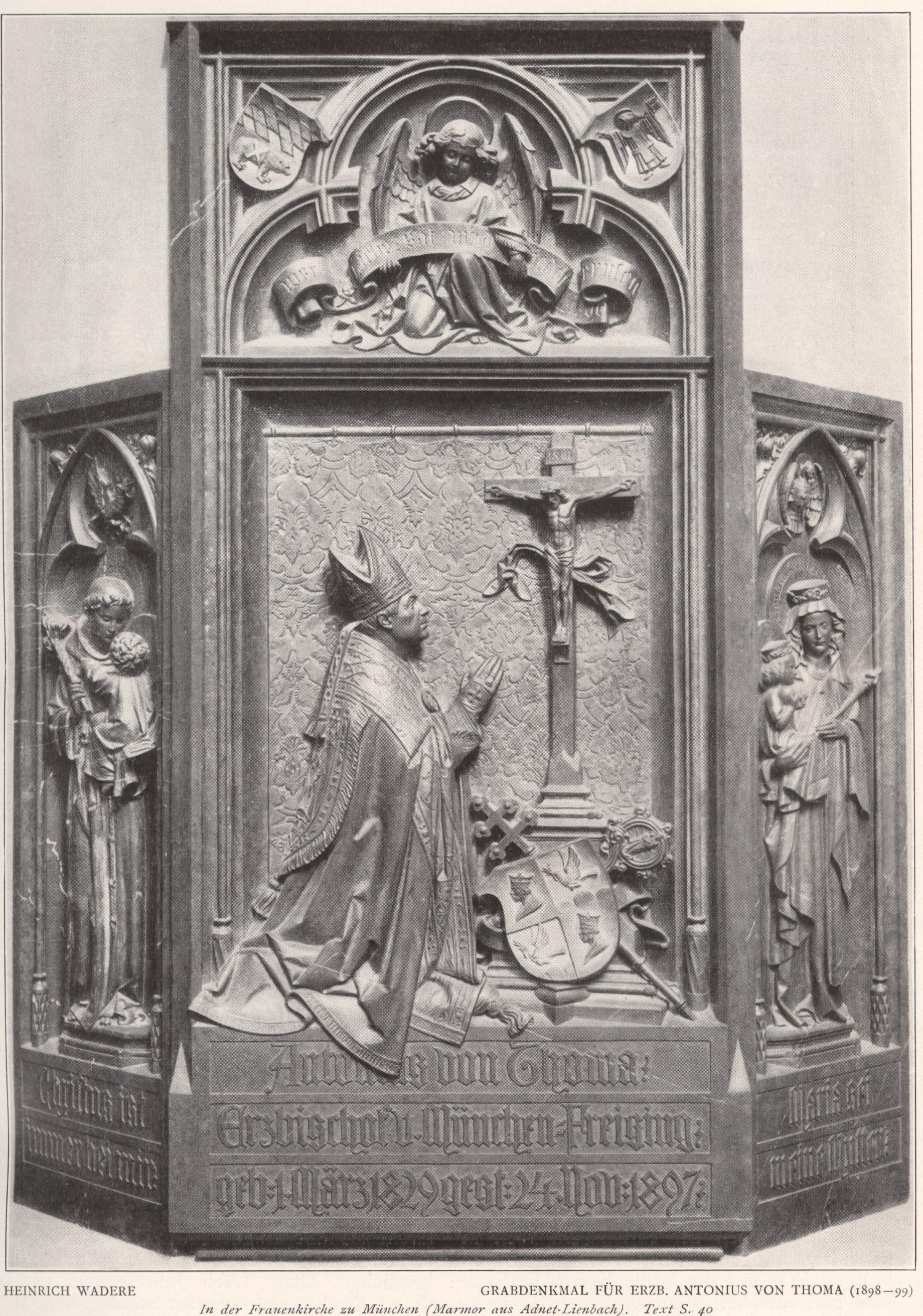
Grave monument of Archbishop Antonius von Thoma, Munich Frauenkirche, by Heinrich Waderé (Zeitschrift für Christliche Kunst, 1908)

Heinrich Maria Waderé (2 July 1865 – 27 February 1950) was a German sculptor and medal engraver.

Waderé was born in Colmar, then part of the French Empire but incorporated in the German Empire about six years later. After an apprenticeship in an engraving workshop he studied at the Akademie der Bildenden Künste in Munich under Syrius Eberle. In 1900 he was appointed professor of figure sculpture at the Akademie für Angewandte Kunst in Munich. Once there he exhibited many times, including in the Münchner Glaspalast. From this period also originated his close connection to the school of carving at Oberammergau.

He was principally known for his Neoclassical medals and monuments, including among others the Richard Wagner Monument at the Prinzregentenplatz in Munich (1913). The figures above the portico of the Prinzregententheater are also by him.

He died in Munich.

== Gallery ==
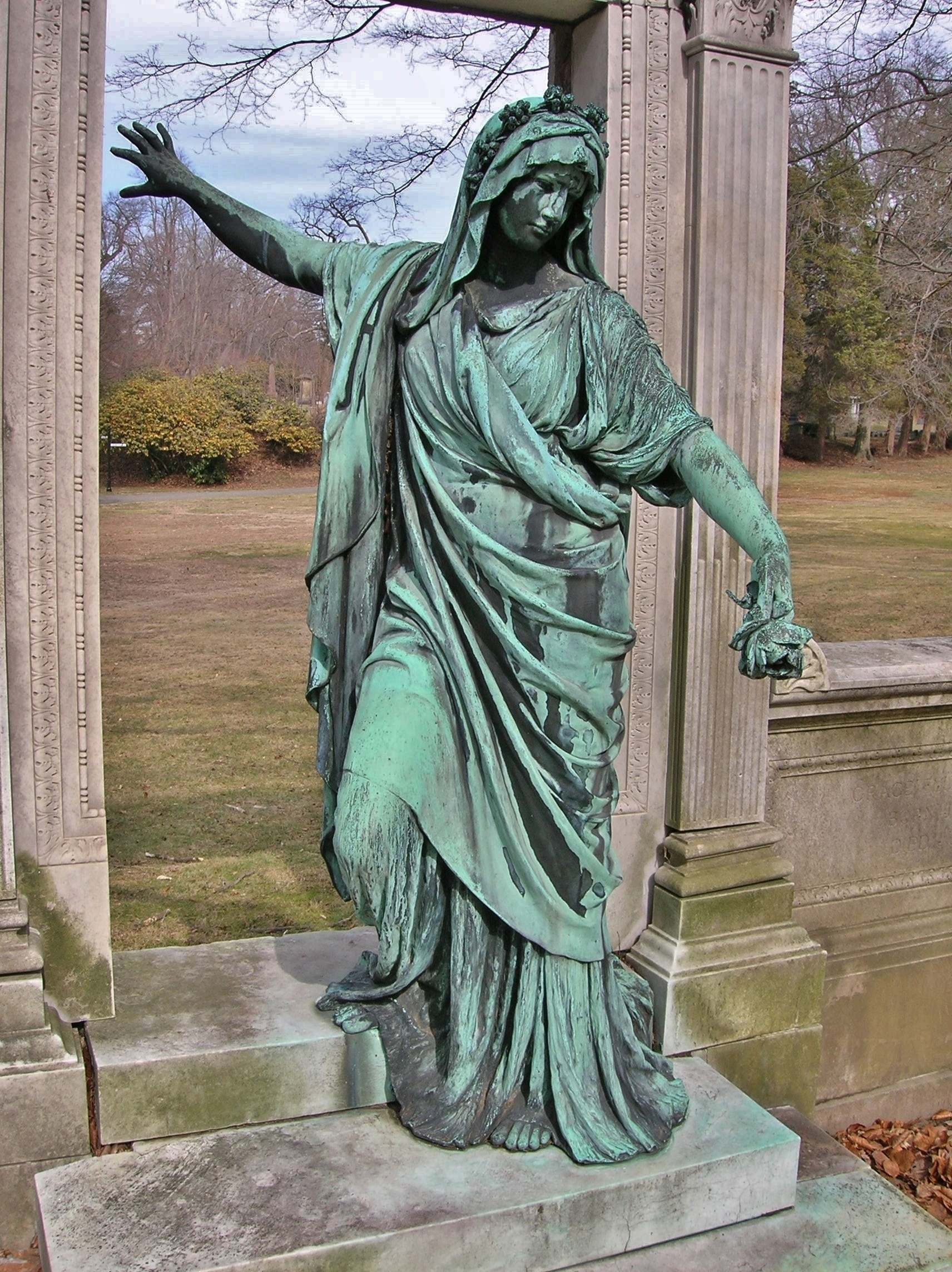
Bronze cemetery sculpture for Winthrop and Elizabeth Bliss Fuller (installed 1910), Springfield, Massachusetts

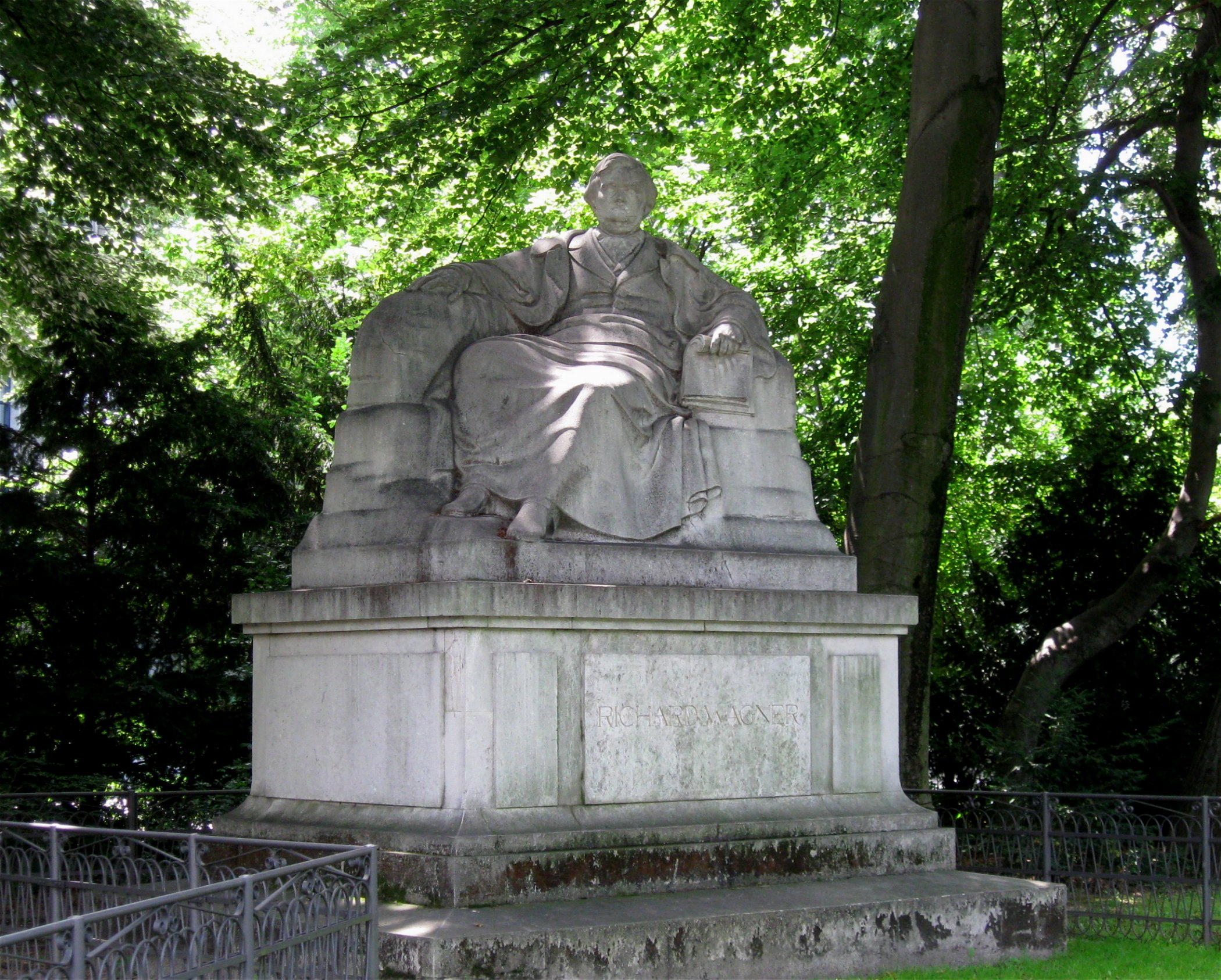
Monument to Richard Wagner by Heinrich Waderé (1913)

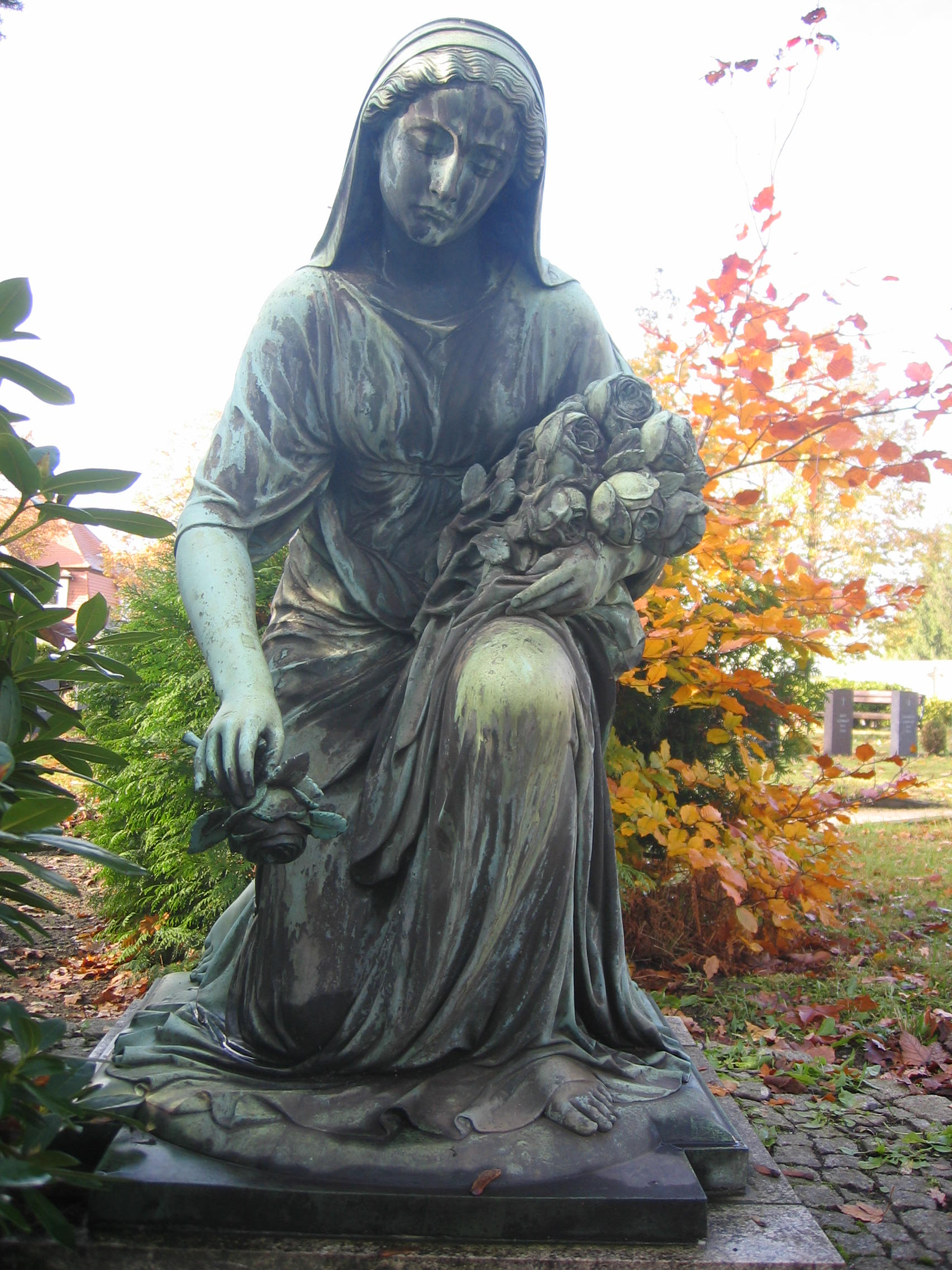
Bronzeskulptur
