= Königliche Kunstgewerbeschule München =

Artistic training institution in Munich, Germany

The Königliche Kunstgewerbeschule München (abbreviation KGS) was founded on October 1, 1868 in Maxvorstadt, Munich after a formal decision of King Maximilian II of Bavaria dated June 29, 1868. Along with the Munich Academy of Fine Arts and the Nuremberg School of Arts and Crafts, founded in 1854, it was the most important artistic training institution in Bavaria, especially under the direction of Richard Riemerschmid from 1913 to 1924.

It was renamed "Staatliche Kunstgewerbeschule München" after the end of the monarchy in 1918, "Staatsschule für angewandte Kunst" in 1928 and "Akademie für angewandte Kunst" in 1937. The Kunstgewerbeschule or Academy of Applied Arts was incorporated into the Akademie der Bildenden Künste München in 1946.

The last school building used at Luisenstraße 37 was destroyed during the Second World War, and a new building for the Geological Institute of LMU Munich has stood in its place since the 1950s.

== Notable people ==
- John Heartfield, German artist

== Literature ==
Claudia Schmalhofer: Die Kgl. Kunstgewerbeschule München (1868–1918). Ihr Einfluss auf die Ausbildung der Zeichenlehrerinnen. Herbert Utz Verlag, München 2005, ISBN 3-8316-0542-4
